= Bertrand Blier filmography =

Bertrand Blier (14 March 1939 – 20 January 2025) was a French film director and writer.

== Filmography ==
Year	Title	Credited as			Notes
Year	Title	Director	Screenwriter	Other	Notes
1959	Oh ! Qué mambo			Yes	As 1st assistant director
1961	Arrêtez les tambours			Yes	As assistant director
1961	Le Monocle noir			Yes	As assistant director
1963	The Virgin of Nuremberg			Yes	As assistant director
1963	Hitler, connais pas	Yes			Documentary; Locarno International Film Festival - Silver Sail
1966	La Grimace	Yes	Yes		Short
1967	If I Were a Spy	Yes	Yes		
1971	Laisse aller... c'est une valse		Yes		
1974	Going Places	Yes	Yes		
1976	Calmos	Yes	Yes		
1978	Get Out Your Handkerchiefs	Yes	Yes		Academy Award for Best Foreign Language Film; National Society of Film Critics Award for Best Film; Nominated—Golden Globe Award for Best Foreign Language Film; Nominated—National Society of Film Critics Award for Best Director (runner-up); Nominated—National Society of Film Critics Award for Best Screenplay (runner-up); Nominated—New York Film Critics Circle Award for Best Screenplay (runner-up)
1979	Buffet froid	Yes	Yes		César Award for Best Screenplay, Dialogue or Adaptation
1981	Beau Pere	Yes	Yes		Nominated—Cannes Film Festival - Palme d'Or
1983	Debout les crabes, la mer monte !		Yes		
1983	My Best Friend's Girl	Yes	Yes		
1984	Our Story	Yes	Yes		César Award for Best Original Screenplay
1986	Evening Dress	Yes	Yes		Nominated—Cannes Film Festival - Palme d'Or; Nominated—César Award for Best Film; Nominated—César Award for Best Director; Nominated—César Award for Best Original Screenplay or Adaptation
1989	Too Beautiful for You	Yes	Yes		Cannes Film Festival - Grand Prix; César Award for Best Film; César Award for Best Director; César Award for Best Original Screenplay or Adaptation
1991	Merci la vie	Yes	Yes		Nominated—César Award for Best Film; Nominated—César Award for Best Director; Nominated—César Award for Best Original Screenplay or Adaptation
1991	My Life Is Hell			Yes	As actor
1991	Lest We Forget	Yes			Segment: Pour Alirio de Crisanto Mederos, Vénézuela
1992	Patrick Dewaere			Yes	As himself
1993	1, 2, 3, Sun	Yes	Yes		Stockholm International Film Festival - Bronze Horse for Best Film; Venice Film Festival - Grand Prize of the European Academy; Nominated—César Award for Best Director; Nominated—Venice Film Festival - Golden Lion
1995	Jamais seul avec toi			Yes	Short; co-producer
1996	My Man	Yes	Yes		Nominated—Berlin Film Festival - Golden Bear
2000	Actors	Yes	Yes		Also actor
2003	Les Côtelettes	Yes	Yes		Nominated—Cannes Film Festival - Palme d'Or
2004	Pédale dure		Yes		
2005	How Much Do You Love Me?	Yes	Yes		Also actor Moscow Film Festival - Silver George for Best Director
2009	All About Actresses			Yes	As actor
2010	The Clink of Ice	Yes	Yes		Venice Film Festival - Europa Cinemas Label; Nominated—César Award for Best Director; Nominated—César Award for Best Original Screenplay
2015	Papa, Alexandre, Maxime et Eduardo			Yes	Short; as actor
2019	Heavy Duty	Yes	Yes		
