= César Award for Best Animated Short Film =

French film award

- Country: France
- Presented by: Académie des Arts et Techniques du Cinéma
- First award: 1977
- Currently held by: Fille de l’eau (2026)
- Website: academie-cinema.org

The César Award for Best Animated Short Film is a French film award, that was awarded by the Académie des Arts et Techniques du Cinéma from 1977 to 1990. Combined with the César Award for Best Animated Film from 2011 to 2013, this award has been fully awarded since 2014.

== List of winners and nominees ==
=== 1970s ===
Year	English title	Original title	Director(s)
1977 (2nd)	Un comédien sans paradoxe		Robert Lapoujade
1977 (2nd)	Bactéries nos amies		Michel Boschet
1977 (2nd)	Déjeuner du matin		Patrick Bokanowski
1977 (2nd)	L'Empreinte		Jacques Cardon
1977 (2nd)	Oiseau de nuit		Bernard Palacios
1977 (2nd)	La Rosette arrosée		Paul Dopff
1978 (3rd)	Rêve		Peter Foldes
1978 (3rd)	Fracture		Paul and Gaëtan Brizzi
1978 (3rd)	Kubrick à brac		Dominique Rocher
1978 (3rd)	La Nichée		Gérard Collin
1978 (3rd)	Mordillissimo		Roger Beaurin
1979 (4th)	La Traversée de L'Atlantique à la rame		Jean-François Laguionie
1979 (4th)	L'Anatomiste		Yves Brangoleau
1979 (4th)	Le Phénomène		Paul Dopff

=== 1980s ===
Year	English title	Original title	Director(s)
1980 (5th)	Demain la petite fille sera en retard à l'école		Michel Boschet
1980 (5th)	Barbe Bleue		Olivier Gillon
1980 (5th)	Les Troubles fête		Bernard Palacios
1981 (6th)	Le Manège		Marc Caro and Jean-Pierre Jeunet
1981 (6th)	Le Réveil		Jean-Christophe Villard
1981 (6th)	Les Trois Inventeurs		Michel Ocelot
1982 (7th)	La Tendresse du maudit		Jean-Manuel Costa
1982 (7th)	L'Échelle		Alain Ughetto
1982 (7th)	Trois thèmes		Alexandre Alexeïeff
1983 (8th)	La Légende du pauvre bossu		Michel Ocelot
1983 (8th)	Chronique 1909		Paul and Gaëtan Brizzi
1983 (8th)	Sans Préavis		Michel Gauthier
1984 (9th)	Le Voyage d'Orphée		Jean-Manuel Costa
1984 (9th)	Au-delà de minuit		Pierre Barletta
1984 (9th)	Le Sang		Jacques Rouxel
1985 (10th)	La Boule		Alain Ughetto
1985 (10th)	L'Invité		Guy Jacques
1985 (10th)	Ra		Thierry Barthes and Pierre Jamin
1986 (11th)	L'Enfant de la haute mer		Patrick Deniau
1986 (11th)	La campagne est si belle		Michel Gauthier
1986 (11th)	Contes crépusculaires		Yves Charnay
1988 (13th)	Le Petit Cirque de toutes les couleurs		Jacques-Rémy Girerd
1988 (13th)	Transatlantique		Bruce Krebs
1989 (14th)	L'Escalier chimérique		Daniel Guyonnet
1989 (14th)	Le Travail du fer		Celia Canning and Néry Catineau
1989 (14th)	La Princesse des diamants		Michel Ocelot

=== 1990s ===
Year	English title	Original title	Director(s)
1990 (15th)	Le Porte-plume		Marie-Christine Perrodin
1990 (15th)	Sculpture, sculptures		Jean-Loup Felicioli

1991-2013: no award given

=== 2010s ===
Year	English title	Original title	Director(s)
2014 (39th)	Kiki of Montparnasse	Mademoiselle Kiki et les Montparnos	Amélie Harrault
2014 (39th)	Women's Letters	Lettre de femmes	Augusto Zanovello
2015 (40th)	Les Petits Cailloux		Chloé Mazlo
2015 (40th)	Bang Bang!		Julien Bisaro
2015 (40th)	La Bûche de Noël		Vincent Patar and Stéphane Aubier
2015 (40th)	Anatole's Little Saucepan	La Petite Casserole d'Anatole	Eric Montchaud
2016 (41st)	Sunday Lunch	Le Repas dominical	Céline Devaux
2016 (41st)	La Nuit américaine d'Angélique		Pierre-Emmanuel Lyet and Joris Clerté
2016 (41st)	Sous tes doigts		Marie-Christine Courtès
2016 (41st)	Tigres à la queue leu leu		Benoît Chieux
2017 (42nd)	Celui qui a deux âmes		Fabrice Luang-Vija
2017 (42nd)	Café froid		Stéphanie Lansaque and François Leroy
2017 (42nd)	Journal animé		Donato Sansone
2017 (42nd)	Peripheria		David Coquard-Dassault
2018 (43rd)	Pépé le morse		Lucrèce Andreae
2018 (43rd)	Le Futur sera chauve		Paul Cabon
2018 (43rd)	I Want Pluto to Be a Planet Again		Marie Amachoukeli and Vladimir Mavounia-Kouka
2018 (43rd)	Le Jardin de minuit		Benoît Chieux
2019 (44th)	Vilaine fille		Ayce Kartal
2019 (44th)	Au coeur des ombres		Alice Eça Guimarães
2019 (44th)	La mort, père et fils		Denis Walgenwtiz
2019 (44th)	Raymonde ou l'évasion verticale		Sarah Van Den Boom

=== 2020s ===
Year	English title	Original title	Director(s)
2020 (45th)	La nuit des sacs plastiques		Gabriel Harel
2020 (45th)	This Magnificent Cake!	Ce magnifique gâteau!	Marc James Roels and Emma de Swaef
2020 (45th)	Je sors acheter des cigarettes		Osman Cerfon
2020 (45th)	Make It Soul		Jean-Charles Mbotti Malolo
2021 (46th)	L'heure de l'Ours		Agnès Patron
2021 (46th)	Bach-Hông		Elsa Duhamel
2021 (46th)	L'Odysée de Choum		Julien Bisaro
2021 (46th)	La tête dans les orties		Paul Cabon
2022 (47th)	Mild Madness, Lasting Lunacy	Folie douce, folie dure	Marine Laclotte
2022 (47th)	Empty Places		Geoffroy De Crécy
2022 (47th)	The World Within	Le monde en soi	Sandrine Stoïanov and Jean-Charles Finck
2022 (47th)	Precious	Précieux	Paul Mas
2023 (48th)	La Vie Sexuelle de Mamie		Urška Djukić, Émilie Pigeard
2023 (48th)	Caline		Margot Reumont
2023 (48th)	Noir-Soleil		Marie Larrivé
2024 (49th)	Été 96		Mathilde Bédouet
2024 (49th)	Drôles d'oiseaux		Charlie Belin
2024 (49th)	La forêt de mademoiselle Tang		Denis Do
2025 (50th)	Yuck!		Loïc Espuche
2025 (50th)	Butterfly	Papillon	Florence Miailhe
2025 (50th)	Gigi		Cynthia Calvi
2026 (51st)	Fille de l’eau		Sandra Desmazières
2026 (51st)	Les Belles Cicatrices		Raphaël Jouzeau
2026 (51st)	God Is Shy		Jocelyn Charles

== See also ==
- List of animation awards
- César Award for Best Animated Film
- Academy Award for Best Animated Feature
- Academy Award for Best Animated Short Film
