= 11th César Awards =

1986 French film awards ceremony

- Date: 22 February 1986
- Site: Palais des Congrès, Paris, France
- Hosted by: Michel Drucker

Highlights
- Best Film: Three Men and a Cradle
- Best Actor: Christopher Lambert
- Best Actress: Sandrine Bonnaire

Television coverage
- Network: Antenne 2

The 11th César Awards ceremony, presented by the Académie des Arts et Techniques du Cinéma, honoured the best French films of 1985 and took place on 22 February 1986 at the Palais des Congrès in Paris. The ceremony was chaired by Madeleine Renaud and Jean-Louis Barrault and hosted by Michel Drucker. Three Men and a Cradle won the award for Best Film.

== Winners and nominees ==
The winners are highlighted in bold:

- Best Film:
  **Three Men and a Cradle**, directed by Coline Serreau
  L'Effrontée, directed by Claude Miller
  Death in a French Garden, directed by Michel Deville
  Sans toit ni loi, directed by Agnès Varda
  Subway, directed by Luc Besson
- Best Foreign Film:
  **The Purple Rose of Cairo**, directed by Woody Allen
  Desperately Seeking Susan, directed by Susan Seidelman
  The Killing Fields, directed by Roland Joffé
  Ran, directed by Akira Kurosawa
  Year of the Dragon, directed by Michael Cimino
- Best First Work:
  **Le Thé au harem d'Archimède**, directed by Mehdi Charef
  Harem, directed by Arthur Joffé
  La Nuit porte-jarretelles, directed by Virginie Thévenet
  Strictement personnel, directed by Pierre Jolivet
- Best Actor:
  **Christopher Lambert**, for Subway
  Robin Renucci, for Escalier C
  Michel Serrault, for On ne meurt que 2 fois
  Gérard Depardieu, for Police
  Lambert Wilson, for Rendez-vous
- Best Actress:
  **Sandrine Bonnaire**, for Sans toit ni loi
  Charlotte Rampling, for On ne meurt que 2 fois
  Nicole Garcia, for Death in a French Garden
  Juliette Binoche, for Rendez-vous
  Isabelle Adjani, for Subway
- Best Supporting Actor:
  **Michel Boujenah**, for 3 hommes et un couffin
  Xavier Deluc, for On ne meurt que 2 fois
  Jean-Hugues Anglade, for Subway
  Jean-Pierre Bacri, for Subway
  Michel Galabru, for Subway
- Best Supporting Actress:
  **Bernadette Lafont**, for L'Effrontée
  Dominique Lavanant, for 3 hommes et un couffin
  Catherine Frot, for Escalier C
  Anémone, for Death in a French Garden
  Macha Méril, for Sans toit ni loi
- Most Promising Actor:
  **Wadeck Stanczak**, for Rendez-vous
  Jean-Philippe Écoffey, for L'Effrontée
  Lucas Belvaux, for Poulet au vinaigre
  Jacques Bonnaffé, for La Tentation d'Isabelle
  Kader Boukhanef, for Le Thé au harem d'Archimède
- Most Promising Actress:
  **Charlotte Gainsbourg**, for L'Effrontée
  Philippine Leroy-Beaulieu, for 3 hommes et un couffin
  Emmanuelle Béart, for L'Amour en douce
  Zabou Breitman, for Billy Ze Kick
  Charlotte Valandrey, for Rouge baiser
- Best Director:
  **Michel Deville**, for Death in a French Garden
  Coline Serreau, for 3 hommes et un couffin
  Claude Miller, for L'Effrontée
  Agnès Varda, for Sans toit ni loi
  Luc Besson, for Subway
- Best Original Screenplay or Adaptation:
  **Coline Serreau**, for 3 hommes et un couffin
  Annie Miller, Luc Béraud, Bernard Stora, Claude Miller, for L'Effrontée
  Jacques Deray, Michel Audiard, for On ne meurt que 2 fois
  Michel Deville, for Death in a French Garden
  André Téchiné, Olivier Assayas, for Rendez-vous
- Best Cinematography:
  **Jean Penzer**, for On ne meurt que 2 fois
  Pasqualino De Santis, for Harem
  Renato Berta, for Rendez-vous
  Carlo Varini, for Subway
- Best Costume Design:
  **Olga Berluti, Catherine Gorne-Achdjian**, for Harem
  Christian Dior, Elisabeth Tavernier, for Bras de fer
  Jacqueline Bouchard, for L'Effrontée
  Christian Gasc, for Rendez-vous
- Best Sound:
  **Gérard Lamps, Luc Perini, Harrik Maury, Harald Maury**, for Subway
  Paul Lainé, Gérard Lamps, for L'Effrontée
  Dominique Hennequin, Pierre Gamet, for Harem
  Jean-Louis Ughetto, Dominique Hennequin, for Rendez-vous
- Best Editing:
  **Raymonde Guyot**, for Death in a French Garden
  Henri Lanoë, for On ne meurt que 2 fois
  Yann Dedet, for Police
  Sophie Schmit, for Subway
- Best Music:
  **Ástor Piazzolla, José Luis Castiñeira de Dios**, for Tangos, l'exil de Gardel
  Michel Portal, for Bras de fer
  Claude Bolling, for On ne meurt que 2 fois
  Éric Serra, for Subway
- Best Production Design:
  **Alexandre Trauner**, for Subway
  Jean-Jacques Caziot, for Bras de fer
  François de Lamothe, for On ne meurt que 2 fois
  Philippe Combastel, for Death in a French Garden
- Best Animated Short:
  **L'Enfant de la haute mer**, directed by Patrick Deniau
  La Campagne est si belle, directed by Michel Gauthier
  Contes crépusculaires, directed by Yves Charnay
- Best Fiction Short Film:
  **Grosse**, directed by Brigitte Roüan
  La Consultation, directed by Radovan Tadic
  Dialogue de sourds, directed by Bernard Nauer
  Juste avant le mariage, directed by Jacques Deschamps
  Le Livre de Marie, directed by Anne-Marie Miéville
- Best Documentary Short Film:
  **New York, N.Y.**, directed by Raymond Depardon
  La Boucane, directed by Jean Gaumy
  C'était la dernière année de ma vie, directed by Claude Weisz
- Best French Language Film:
  **Derborence**, directed by Francis Reusser
  **Vivement ce soir**, directed by Patrick Van Antwerpen
- Honorary César:
  Cinémathèque Française
  Bette Davis
  Jean Delannoy
  René Ferracci
  Shoah, directed by Claude Lanzmann

== See also ==
- 58th Academy Awards
- 39th British Academy Film Awards
