= 13th César Awards =

1988 French film awards ceremony

- Date: 12 March 1988
- Site: Palais des Congrès, Paris, France
- Hosted by: Michel Drucker and Jane Birkin

Highlights
- Best Film: Au revoir les enfants
- Best Actor: Richard Bohringer
- Best Actress: Anémone
- Most awards: Au revoir les enfants (7)
- Most nominations: Au revoir les enfants (9)

Television coverage
- Network: Antenne 2

The 13th César Awards ceremony, presented by the Académie des Arts et Techniques du Cinéma, honoured the best French films of 1987 and took place on 12 March 1988 at the Palais des Congrès in Paris. The ceremony was chaired by Miloš Forman and hosted by Michel Drucker and Jane Birkin. Au revoir les enfants won the award for Best Film.

== Winners and nominees ==
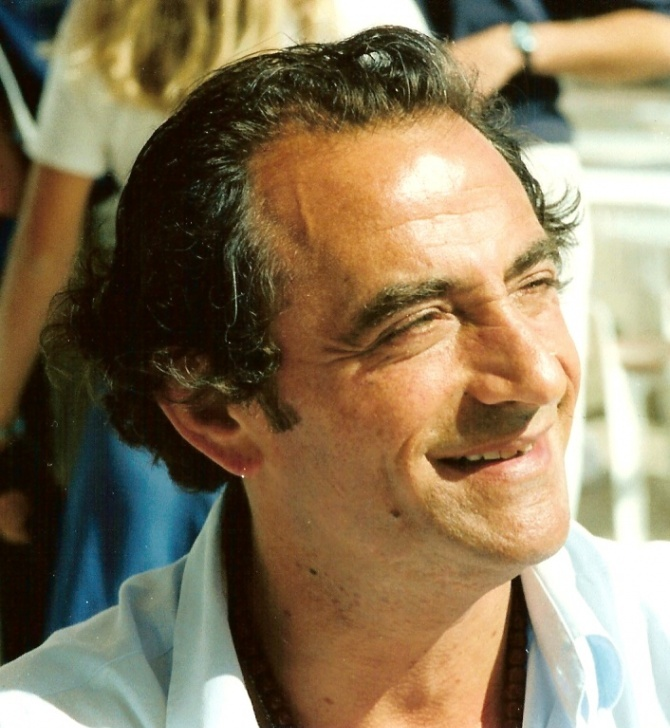
Richard Bohringer, Best Actor winner

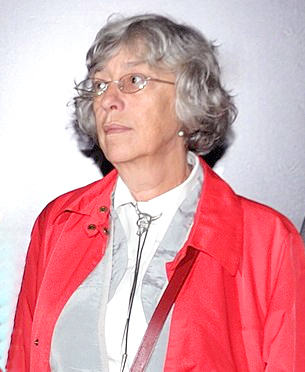
Anémone, Best Actress winner

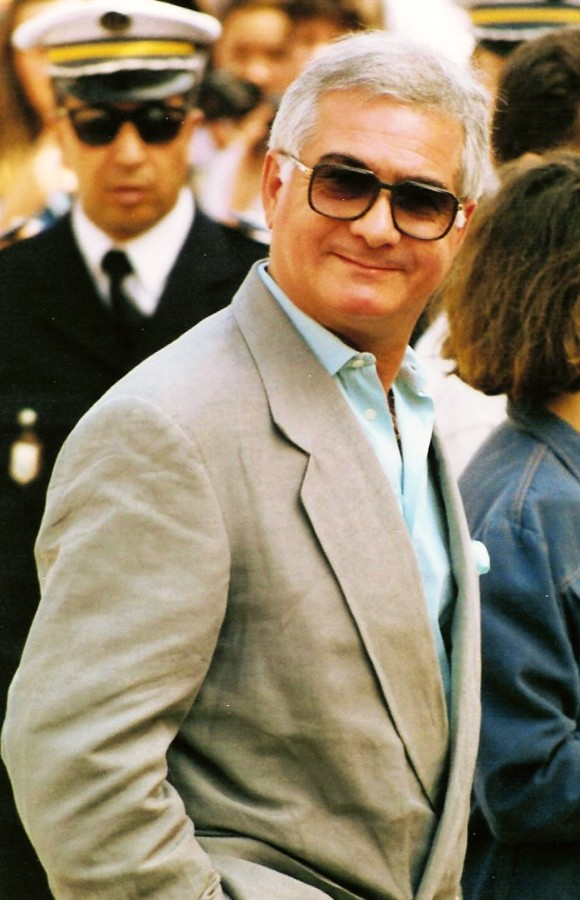
Jean-Claude Brialy, Best Supporting Actor winner

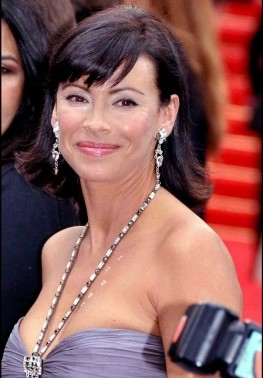
Mathilda May, Most Promising Actress winner

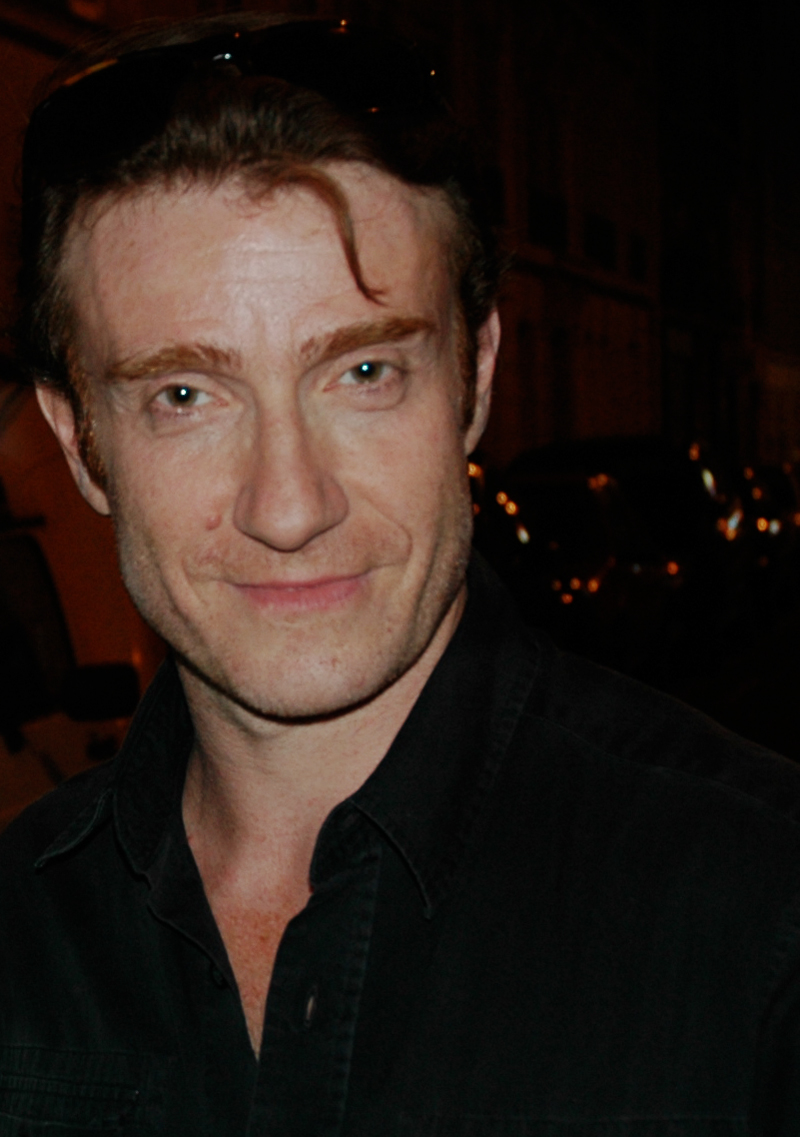
Thierry Frémont, Most Promising Actor winner

Best Film Au revoir les enfants: The Grand Highway; Les Innocents; Under the Sun of Satan; Tandem	Best Director Louis Malle – Au revoir les enfants: Jean-Loup Hubert – The Grand Highway; André Téchiné – Les Innocents; Maurice Pialat – Under the Sun of Satan; Patrice Leconte – Tandem
Best Actor Richard Bohringer – The Grand Highway: Christophe Malavoy – Engagements of the Heart; Jean Carmet – Miss Mona; Gérard Depardieu – Under the Sun of Satan; Gérard Jugnot – Tandem; Jean Rochefort – Tandem	Best Actress Anémone – The Grand Highway: Catherine Deneuve – Agent trouble; Nastassja Kinski – Malady of Love; Jeanne Moreau – The Miracle; Sandrine Bonnaire – Under the Sun of Satan
Best Supporting Actor Jean-Claude Brialy – Les Innocents: Tom Novembre – Agent trouble; Jean-Pierre Kalfon – The Cry of the Owl; Jean-Pierre Léaud – Lady Cops; Guy Marchand – Widow's Walk	Best Supporting Actress Dominique Lavanant – Agent trouble: Anna Karina – Cayenne Palace; Marie Laforêt – Fucking Fernand; Bernadette Lafont – Masks; Sylvie Joly – The Miracle
Most Promising Actor Thierry Frémont – Travelling avant: François Négret – Au revoir les enfants; Cris Campion – Field of Honor; Pascal Légitimus – L'Œil au beur(re) noir	Most Promising Actress Mathilda May – The Cry of the Owl: Sophie Renoir – Boyfriends and Girlfriends; Anne Brochet – Masks; Julie Delpy – Beatrice
Best Original Screenplay or Adaptation Au revoir les enfants – Louis Malle: Boyfriends and Girlfriends – Éric Rohmer; The Grand Highway – Jean-Loup Hubert; Beatrice – Colo Tavernier O'Hagan; Tandem – Patrice Leconte, Patrick Dewolf	Best First Feature Film L'Œil au beurre noir: Avril brisé; Flag; Manuela's Loves; Sorceress
Best Cinematography Renato Berta – Au revoir les enfants: Patrick Blossier – Miss Mona; Willy Kurant – Under the Sun of Satan	Best Editing Emmanuelle Castro – Au revoir les enfants: Raymonde Guyot – The Grand Highway; Yann Dedet – Under the Sun of Satan
Best Sound Jean-Claude Laureux, Claude Villand, Bernard Leroux – Au revoir les enfants: Jean-Louis Ughetto, Dominique Hennequin – Les Innocents; Bernard Bats, Gérard Lamps – A Man in Love	Best Original Music Michel Portal – Field of Honor: Gabriel Yared – Agent trouble; Philippe Sarde – Les Innocents
Best Costume Design Jacqueline Moreau – Beatrice: Corinne Jorry – Au revoir les enfants; Olga Berluti – Engagements of the Heart	Best Production Design Willy Holt – Au revoir les enfants: Jean-Pierre Kohut-Svelko – Ennemis intimes; Guy-Claude François – Beatrice
Best Animated Short Film Le Petit Cirque de toutes les couleurs: Transatlantique	Best Fiction Short Film Présence féminine: D'après Maria; Pétition
Best Documentary Short Film L'Été perdu: Pour une poignée de Kurus	Best Poster Tandem – Stéphane Bielikoff, Sadi Nouri: The Last Emperor – Philippe Lemoine; Under the Sun of Satan – Benjamin Baltimore, Luc Roux; A Man in Love – Philippe Lemoine
Best Foreign Film The Last Emperor: Wings of Desire; Intervista; Dark Eyes; The Untouchables
Honorary César Serge Silberman

== See also ==
- 60th Academy Awards
- 41st British Academy Film Awards
