= Buffet froid =

- Theatrical release poster showing Blier, Depardieu and Carmet
- Directed by: Bertrand Blier
- Written by: Bertrand Blier
- Produced by: Alain Sarde
- Starring: Gérard Depardieu; Bernard Blier; Jean Carmet
- Cinematography: Jean Penzer
- Edited by: Claudine Merlin
- Music by: Philippe Sarde and Johannes Brahms
- Production companies: Sara Films; Antenne 2
- Distributed by: Parafrance Films
- Release date: 19 December 1979
- Running time: 89 minutes
- Country: France
- Language: French

Buffet froid (lit. 'Cold Buffet', known under the English-language title Cold Cuts) is a 1979 French film written and directed by Bertrand Blier, starring Gérard Depardieu, Carole Bouquet, Bernard Blier and Jean Carmet. The film is a surreal black comedy portrayed as a crime thriller, set in Paris where contemporary urban life has alienated and dehumanized the city dwellers. The film won a César Award for Best Screenplay, Dialogue or Adaptation, and was nominated for Best Cinematography, Editing, and Production Design.

In the film, a daydreaming man offers his bloodstained knife to a random accountant at a metro station. While the two men argue, the knife disappears. When the accountant is mysteriously murdered with this same knife, the daydreamer chats about the murder with his new neighbor, a police inspector. A series of strange encounters eventually leads to the murder of the daydreamer.

== Plot ==
The film begins at La Défense station (RER), with Alphonse Tram (Gérard Depardieu), a dreamy loner, chatting with an accountant who is travelling home very late. The accountant, a man of orthodox social outlook and standing is disturbed by and fearful of this rambling loner, more so when Tram attempts to give him his bloodstained knife (in order to reduce the chances of him "doing something silly..."). They argue and the accountant puts the knife on a seat a few feet away behind them. They talk more and then notice the knife has disappeared.

Later that night, Tram discovers the same man in a tunnel leading from another metro station, lying down with the knife stabbed into his stomach. He has no explanation to a police inspector Bernard (Blier) who is moving into another apartment in the otherwise deserted condominium to whom he recounts the incident. He speculates, perhaps unwisely but without caring for the potential consequences, to the inspector that it was his own knife that killed the accountant. The police inspector, irate at having to consider a complex case while off-duty, pushes Tram out of his apartment. He says that he has a bellyful of murders all day and doesn't want another to deal with. This sparks off a series of bizarre occurrences around the city after Tram's wife is killed.

The perpetrator (Jean Carmet) arrives at Tram's apartment and confesses to the murder. This is seemingly taken light-heartedly by the police officer and Tram himself, and the three drink together. Another man appears, who claims to have seen all in the métro; Tram goes to kill a man in car, but the driver wants to end his life anyway. His widow is taken care of by Tram, the inspector and the murderer, but when a doctor comes to treat her, she goes to bed with him.

The three men leave for the countryside to find some peace, but someone comes and kills the murderer, mistaking him for Tram. Trapped by a pretty girl and led onto a boat, Tram gets rid of the inspector before himself being shot by the girl, the daughter of the man found dead in the métro.

== Cast ==
- Gérard Depardieu as Alphonse Tram
- Bernard Blier as Insp. Morvandiau
- Jean Carmet as The murderer
- Liliane Rovère as Josyane
- Carole Bouquet as The young woman at the end
- Jean Benguigui as The hired killer
- Jean Rougerie as Eugène Léonard
- Bernard Crombey as The doctor
- Eric Wasberg as Inspector Cavana
- Geneviève Page as Geneviève Léonard
- Michel Serrault as The accountant in the opening scenes (uncredited)

== Background ==
The director claimed that the scenario of Buffet froid was one of the faster he had put together, in only two weeks, based on a recurring dream where he was pursued by the police (as Alphonse has in the film).

After having won an Oscar for best foreign film in 1977 for Préparez vos mouchoirs, Blier declined all the resulting offers from the US, but did use his success to aid the financing of Buffet froid "Without that statuette, the project would perhaps have been a non-starter".

This was the third and last time that Bertrand Blier would direct his father Bernard in a film (after If I Were a Spy and Calmos) and it was Depardieu's third film for Blier - he would go to make six more with the director.

The scene where Alphonse meets a man at the Défense station and finds him a few moments later in a passageway with a knife in his stomach, was initially filmed with actor Jacques Rispal, but the director felt it simply didn't work; he needed "un monstre de talent" such as a Louis Jouvet. So Blier got Michel Serrault - uncredited guest star - to spend two evenings at the end of shooting to remake the scene with Depardieu.

== Music ==
As well as original music by prolific film composer Philippe Sarde (elder brother of the producer), the film uses three chamber works for strings by Brahms in performances by the Bartók Quartet recorded on the Hungaroton label: the string quartet opus 51 no.1 in a real chamber music recital, the string quintet op.111, and in the closing scene and credits his string sextet op.36.

== Reception ==
The film had 777,127 admissions in France which was considered average. It has however since gained cult status.

It has been described as a "Rigorously absurd contemporary film noir which presents every character, incident and situation known to the genre, but none of the customary explanations, motivations or consequences", and as a "Black comedy about solitude and the dehumanization of the modern world".
