= 5th César Awards =

1980 French film awards ceremony

- Date: 2 February 1980
- Site: Salle Pleyel, Paris, France
- Hosted by: Pierre Tchernia and Peter Ustinov

Highlights
- Best Film: Tess
- Best Actor: Claude Brasseur
- Best Actress: Miou-Miou

Television coverage
- Network: Antenne 2

The 5th César Awards ceremony, presented by the Académie des Arts et Techniques du Cinéma, honoured the best French films of 1979 and took place on 2 February 1980 at the Salle Pleyel in Paris. The ceremony was chaired by Jean Marais and hosted by Pierre Tchernia and Peter Ustinov. Tess won the award for Best Film.

== Winners and nominees ==
The winners are highlighted in bold:

- Best Film:
  **Tess**, directed by Roman Polanski
  Womanlight directed by Costa Gavras
  Don Giovanni, directed by Joseph Losey
  I... comme Icare, directed by Henri Verneuil
- Best Foreign Film:
  **Manhattan**, directed by Woody Allen
  Apocalypse Now, directed by Francis Ford Coppola
  Die Blechtrommel, directed by Volker Schlöndorff
  Hair, directed by Miloš Forman
- Best Actor:
  **Claude Brasseur**, for The Police War
  Jean Rochefort, for Courage - Let's Run
  Yves Montand, for I... comme Icare
  Patrick Dewaere, for Série noire
- Best Actress:
  **Miou-Miou**, for La Dérobade
  Romy Schneider, for Womanlight
  Dominique Laffin, for The Crying Woman
  Nastassja Kinski, for Tess
- Best Supporting Actor:
  **Jean Bouise**, for Coup de tête
  Michel Aumont, for Courage - Let's Run
  Bernard Blier, for Série noire
  Bernard Giraudeau, for Le Toubib
- Best Supporting Actress:
  **Nicole Garcia**, for Le Cavaleur
  Dominique Lavanant, for Courage - Let's Run
  Maria Schneider, for La Dérobade
  Myriam Boyer, for Série noire
- Best Director:
  **Roman Polanski**, for Tess
  Costa Gavras, for Womanlight
  Joseph Losey, for Don Giovanni
  Jacques Doillon, for La Drôlesse
- Best Screenplay, Dialogue or Adaptation:
  **Bertrand Blier**, for Buffet froid
  Jacques Doillon, for La Drôlesse
  Henri Verneuil, Didier Decoin, for I... comme Icare
  Alain Corneau, Georges Perec, for Série noire
- Best Cinematography:
  **Ghislain Cloquet**, for Tess
  Jean Penzer, for Buffet froid
  Néstor Almendros, for Perceval le Gallois
  Bruno Nuytten, for Les Soeurs Brontë
- Best Sound:
  **Pierre Gamet**, for Womanlight
  Alain Lachassagne, for Martin et Léa
  Jean-Pierre Ruh, for Perceval le Gallois
  Pierre Lenoir, for Retour à la bien-aimée
- Best Editing:
  **Reginald Beck**, for Don Giovanni
  Claudine Merlin, for Buffet froid
  Henri Lanoë, for Le Cavaleur
  Claudine Merlin, for Les Soeurs Brontë
  Thierry Derocles, for Série noire
- Best Music:
  **Georges Delerue**, for L'Amour en fuite
  Vladimir Cosma, for La Dérobade
  Ennio Morricone, for I... comme Icare
  Philippe Sarde, for Tess
- Best Production Design:
  **Alexandre Trauner**, for Don Giovanni
  Théobald Meurisse, for Buffet froid
  Jacques Saulnier, for I... comme Icare
  Pierre Guffroy, for Tess
- Best Animated Short:
  **Demain la petite fille sera en retard à l'école**, directed by Michel Boschet
  Barbe bleue, directed by Olivier Gillon
  Les Troubles fêtes, directed by Bernard Palacios
- Best Fiction Short Film:
  **Colloque de chiens**, directed by Raúl Ruiz
  Nuit feline, directed by Gérard Marx
  Sibylle, directed by Robert Cappa
- Best Documentary Short Film:
  **Petit Pierre**, directed by Emmanuel Clot
  Georges Demeny, directed by Joël Farges
  Panoplie, directed by Philippe Gaucherand
  Le Sculpteur parfait, directed by Rafi Toumayan
- Honorary César:
  **Pierre Braunberger**
  **Louis de Funès**
  **Kirk Douglas**

== See also ==
- 52nd Academy Awards
- 33rd British Academy Film Awards
