= Jacques Rouxel =

Jacques Rouxel may refer to:

- Jacques Rouxel (animator) (1931–2004), French animator
- Jacques Rouxel (production designer), French production designer
