= César Award for Best Production Design =

French film award

- Country: France
- Presented by: Académie des Arts et Techniques du Cinéma
- First award: 1976
- Currently held by: Catherine Cosme for The Great Arch (2026)
- Website: academie-cinema.org

This is the list of winners and nominees of the César Award for Best Production Design (French: César des meilleurs décors).

== Winners and nominees ==
=== 1970s ===
Year	English title	Original title	Production designer(s)
1976	Let Joy Reign Supreme	Que la fête commence	Pierre Guffroy
1976	La Chair de l'orchidée		Richard Peduzzi
1976	The Story of Adele H.	L'Histoire d'Adèle H.	Jean-Pierre Kohut Svelko
1976	That Most Important Thing: Love	L'Important c'est d'aimer	Jean-Pierre Kohut Svelko
1977	Monsieur Klein		Alexandre Trauner
1977	Barocco		Fernandino Scarsiotti
1977	The Toy	Le Jouet	Bernard Evein
1977	The Tenant	Le Locataire	Pierre Guffroy
1977	Mado		Pierre Guffroy
1978	Providence		Jacques Saulnier
1978	This Sweet Sickness	Dites-lui que je l'aime	Hilton Mc Connico
1978	Pardon Mon Affaire, Too!	Nous irons tous au paradis	Jean-Pierre Kohut Svelko
1978	Madame Rosa	La Vie devant soi	Bernard Evein
1979	Molière		Guy-Claude François
1979	One Two Two	One, Two, Two: 122, rue de Provence	François de Lamothe
1979	Dirty Dreamer	Sale rêveur	Théobald Meurisse
1979	Violette Nozière		Jacques Brizzio

=== 1980s ===
Year	English title	Original title	Production designer(s)
1980	Don Giovanni		Alexandre Trauner
1980	Buffet froid		Théobald Meurisse
1980	I as in Icarus	I... comme Icare	Jacques Saulnier
1980	Tess		Pierre Guffroy
1981	The Last Metro	Le Dernier Métro	Jean-Pierre Kohut Svelko
1981	The Lady Banker	La Banquière	Jean-Jacques Caziot
1981	My American Uncle	Mon oncle d'Amérique	Jacques Saulnier
1981	A Bad Son	Un mauvais fils	Dominique André
1982	Malevil		Max Douy
1982	Coup de Torchon		Alexandre Trauner
1982	Diva		Hilton Mc Connico
1982	Quest for Fire	La Guerre du feu	Brian Morris
1983	The Return of Martin Guerre	Le Retour de Martin Guerre	Alain Negre
1983	Les Misérables		François de Lamothe
1983	The Trout	La Truite	Alexandre Trauner
1983	Une chambre en ville		Bernard Evein
1984	Moon in the Gutter	La Lune dans le caniveau	Hilton Mc Connico
1984	Life Is a Bed of Roses	La vie est un roman	Jacques Saulnier
1984	So Long, Stooge	Tchao Pantin	Alexandre Trauner
1984	Deadly Circuit	Mortelle Randonnée	Jean-Pierre Kohut Svelko
1985	Swann in Love	Un amour de Swann	Jacques Saulnier
1985	Carmen		Enrico Job
1985	Les Cavaliers de l'orage		Jean-Jacques Caziot
1985	Our Story	Notre histoire	Bernard Evein
1986	Subway		Alexandre Trauner
1986	He Died with His Eyes Open	On ne meurt que deux fois	François de Lamothe
1986	Bras de fer		Jean-Jacques Caziot
1986	Death in a French Garden	Péril en la demeure	Philippe Combastel
1987	Pirates		Pierre Guffroy
1987	Round Midnight	Autour de minuit	Alexandre Trauner
1987	Mélo		Jacques Saulnier
1987	Thérèse		Bernard Evein
1988	Au revoir les enfants		Willy Holt
1988	Beatrice	La Passion Béatrice	Guy-Claude François
1988	Ennemis intimes		Jean-Pierre Kohut Svelko
1989	Camille Claudel		Bernard Vezat
1989	Three Seats for the 26th	Trois places pour le 26	Bernard Evein
1989	The Reader	La Lectrice	Thierry Leproust

=== 1990s ===
Year	English title	Original title	Production designer(s)
1990	Valmont		Pierre Guffroy
1990	Bunker Palace Hôtel		Michèle Abbe
1990	Too Beautiful for You	Trop belle pour toi	Théobald Meurisse
1991	Cyrano de Bergerac		Ezio Frigerio
1991	La Femme Nikita	Nikita	Dan Weil
1991	The Hairdresser's Husband	Le Mari de la coiffeuse	Ivan Maussion
1992	Delicatessen		Jean-Philippe Carp and Kreka Kljakovic
1992	Les Amants du Pont-Neuf		Michel Vandestien
1992	Van Gogh		Philippe Pallut and Katia Wyszkop
1993	Indochine		Jacques Bufnoir
1993	The Lover	L'Amant	Hoang Thanh At
1993	Le Souper		François de Lamothe
1994	Smoking/No Smoking		Jacques Saulnier
1994	Germinal		Hoang Thanh At and Christian Marti
1994	Justinien Trouvé ou le Bâtard de Dieu		Jacques Bufnoir
1995	Farinelli		Gianni Quaranta
1995	La Reine Margot		Richard Peduzzi and Olivier Radot
1995	Colonel Chabert	Le Colonel Chabert	Bernard Vezat
1996	The City of Lost Children	La Cité des enfants perdus	Jean Rabasse
1996	Madame Butterfly		Michèle Abbe
1996	The Horseman on the Roof	Le Hussard sur le toit	Ezio Frigerio, Christian Marti and Jacques Rouxel
1997	Ridicule		Ivan Maussion
1997	Beaumarchais	Beaumarchais, l'insolent	Jean-Marc Kerdelhué
1997	Capitaine Conan		Guy-Claude François
1998	The Fifth Element	Le Cinquième Élément	Dan Weil
1998	On Guard	Le Bossu	Bernard Vezat
1998	Same Old Song	On connaît la chanson	Jacques Saulnier
1999	Lautrec		Jacques Rouxel
1999	Those Who Love Me Can Take the Train	Ceux qui m'aiment prendront le train	Sylvain Chauvelot and Richard Peduzzi
1999	Place Vendôme		Thierry Flamand

=== 2000s ===
Year	Winner and nominees	Original title	Production designer(s)
2000	Rembrandt		Philippe Chiffre
2000	Asterix & Obelix Take On Caesar	Astérix et Obélix contre César	Jean Rabasse
2000	The Messenger: The Story of Joan of Arc	Jeanne d'Arc	Hugues Tissandier
2000	Peut-être		François Emmanuelli
2001 (26th)	Vatel		Jean Rabasse
2001 (26th)	Saint-Cyr		Thierry François
2001 (26th)	Sentimental Destinies	Les Destinées sentimentales	Katia Wyszkop
2002 (27th)	Amélie	Le Fabuleux Destin d'Amélie Poulain	Aline Bonetto
2002 (27th)	Brotherhood of the Wolf	Le Pacte des loups	Guy-Claude François
2002 (27th)	The Lady and the Duke	L'Anglaise et le duc	Antoine Fontaine
2003 (28th)	The Pianist		Allan Starski
2003 (28th)	8 Women	8 femmes	Arnaud de Moleron
2003 (28th)	Asterix & Obelix: Mission Cleopatra	Astérix & Obélix: Mission Cléopâtre	Hoang Thanh At
2003 (28th)	Safe Conduct	Laissez-passer	Émile Ghigo
2004 (29th)	Bon voyage		Catherine Leterrier and Jacques Rouxel
2004 (29th)	Monsieur N.		Patrick Durand
2004 (29th)	Not on the Lips	Pas sur la bouche	Jacques Saulnier
2005 (30th)	A Very Long Engagement	Un long dimanche de fiançailles	Aline Bonetto
2005 (30th)	The Chorus	Les Choristes	François Chauvaud
2005 (30th)	Immortel	Immortel (ad vitam)	Jean-Pierre Fouillet
2006 (31st)	Gabrielle		Olivier Radot
2006 (31st)	Grey Souls	Les Âmes grises	Loula Morin
2006 (31st)	Merry Christmas	Joyeux Noël	Jean-Michel Simonet
2007 (32nd)	OSS 117: Cairo, Nest of Spies	OSS 117: Le Caire nid d'espions	Maamar Ech-Cheikh
2007 (32nd)	Days of Glory	Indigènes	Dominique Dourand
2007 (32nd)	Lady Chatterley		François-Renaud Labarthe
2007 (32nd)	Private Fears in Public Places	Cœurs	Jacques Saulnier
2007 (32nd)	The Tiger Brigades	Les Brigades du Tigre	Jean-Luc Raoul
2008 (33rd)	La Vie en Rose	La môme	Olivier Raoux
2008 (33rd)	Jacquou le Croquant		Christian Marti
2008 (33rd)	Molière		Françoise Dupertuis
2008 (33rd)	The Second Wind	Le Deuxième Souffle	Thierry Flamand
2008 (33rd)	A Secret	Un secret	Jean-Pierre Kohut Svelko
2009 (34th)	Séraphine		Thierry François
2009 (34th)	Home		Ivan Niclass
2009 (34th)	Paris 36	Faubourg 36	Jean Rabasse
2009 (34th)	Public Enemy Number One: Part 1 and 2	L'Instinct de mort and L'Ennemi public n°1	Emile Ghigo
2009 (34th)	Trouble at Timpetill	Les Enfants de Timpelbach	Olivier Raoux

=== 2010s ===
Year	Winner and nominees	Original title	Production designer(s)
2010 (35th)	A Prophet	Un prophète	Michel Barthélemy
2010 (35th)	Micmacs à tire-larigot		Aline Bonetto
2010 (35th)	OSS 117: Lost in Rio	OSS 117: Rio ne répond plus	Maamar Ech Cheikh
2010 (35th)	In the Beginning	À l'origine	Émile Ghigo
2010 (35th)	Coco Before Chanel	Coco avant Chanel	Olivier Radot
2011 (36th)	The Extraordinary Adventures of Adèle Blanc-Sec	Les Aventures extraordinaires d'Adèle Blanc-Sec	Hugues Tissandier
2011 (36th)	Of Gods and Men	Des hommes et des dieux	Michel Barthélemy
2011 (36th)	The Princess of Montpensier	La Princesse de Montpensier	Guy-Claude Francois
2011 (36th)	The Ghost Writer		Albrecht Konrad
2011 (36th)	Gainsbourg (Vie héroïque)		Christian Marti
2012 (37th)	The Artist		Laurence Bennett
2012 (37th)	House of Tolerance	L'Apollonide: Souvenirs de la maison close	Alain Guffroy
2012 (37th)	The Women on the 6th Floor	Les Femmes du 6ème étage	Pierre-François Limbosch
2012 (37th)	The Minister	L'Exercice de l'État	Jean-Marc Tran Tan Ba
2012 (37th)	Le Havre		Wouter Zoon
2013 (38th)	Farewell, My Queen	Les Adieux à la reine	Katia Wyszkop
2013 (38th)	My Way	Cloclo	Philippe Chiffre
2013 (38th)	Populaire		Sylvie Olivé
2013 (38th)	Amour		Jean-Vincent Puzos
2013 (38th)	Holy Motors		Florian Sanson
2014 (39th)	Mood Indigo	L'Écume des jours	Stéphane Rozenbaum
2014 (39th)	Michael Kohlhaas		Yan Arlaud
2014 (39th)	Renoir		Benoit Barouh
2014 (39th)	The Young and Prodigious T.S. Spivet		Aline Bonetto
2014 (39th)	Me, Myself and Mum	Les Garçons et Guillaume, à table!	Sylvie Olivé
2015 (40th)	Beauty and the Beast	La Belle et la Bête	Thierry Flamand
2015 (40th)	The Connection	La French	Jean-Philippe Moreaux
2015 (40th)	Saint Laurent		Katia Wyszkop
2015 (40th)	Timbuktu		Sébastien Birchler
2015 (40th)	Yves Saint Laurent		Aline Bonetto
2016 (41st)	Marguerite		Martin Kurel
2016 (41st)	Dheepan		Michel Barthélémy
2016 (41st)	Diary of a Chambermaid	Journal d'une femme de chambre	Katia Wyszkop
2016 (41st)	L'Odeur de la mandarine		Jean Rabasse
2016 (41st)	My Golden Days	Trois souvenirs de ma jeunesse	Toma Baquéni
2017 (42nd)	Chocolat		Jérémie D. Lignol
2017 (42nd)	The Dancer	La Danseuse	Carlos Conti
2017 (42nd)	Frantz		Michel Barthélémy
2017 (42nd)	Slack Bay	Ma Loute	Riton Dupire-Clément
2017 (42nd)	Planetarium		Katia Wyszkop
2018 (43rd)	See You Up There	Au revoir là-haut	Pierre Quefféléan
2018 (43rd)	BPM (Beats per Minute)	120 battements par minute	Emmanuelle Duplay
2018 (43rd)	Barbara		Laurent Baude
2018 (43rd)	Promise at Dawn	La Promesse de l'aube	Pierre Renson
2018 (43rd)	Redoubtable	Le Redoutable	Christian Marti
2019 (44th)	The Sisters Brothers	Les Frères Sisters	Michel Barthélémy
2019 (44th)	Memoir of War	La Douleur	Pascal Le Guellec
2019 (44th)	Mademoiselle de Joncquières		David Faivre
2019 (44th)	One Nation, One King	Un peuple et son roi	Thierry François
2019 (44th)	The Emperor of Paris	L'Empereur de Paris	Emile Ghigo

=== 2020s ===
Year	Winner and nominees	Original title	Production designer(s)
2020 (45th)	La Belle Époque		Stéphane Rozenbaum
2020 (45th)	The Wolf's Call	Le Chant du loup	Benoît Barouh
2020 (45th)	Edmond		Franck Schwarz
2020 (45th)	An Officer and a Spy	J'accuse	Jean Rabasse
2020 (45th)	Portrait of a Lady on Fire	Portrait de la jeune fille en feu	Thomas Grézaud
2021 (46th)	Bye Bye Morons	Adieu les cons	Carlos Conti
2021 (46th)	How to Be a Good Wife	La Bonne Épouse	Thierry François
2021 (46th)	Love Affair(s)	Les Choses qu'on dit, les choses qu'on fait	David Faivre
2021 (46th)	De Gaulle		Nicolas De Boiscuillé
2021 (46th)	Summer of 85	Été 85	Benoît Barouh
2022 (47th)	Lost Illusions	Illusions perdues	Riton Dupire-Clémént
2022 (47th)	Aline		Emmanuelle Duplay
2022 (47th)	Annette		Florian Sanson
2022 (47th)	Delicious	Délicieux	Bertrand Seitz
2022 (47th)	Eiffel		Stéphane Taillasson
2023 (48th)	Simone Veil, A Woman of the Century	Simone, le voyage du siècle	Christian Marti
2023 (48th)	Forever Young	Les Amandiers	Emmanuelle Duplay
2023 (48th)	The Colours of Fire	Couleurs de l'incendie	Sebastian Birchler
2023 (48th)	The Night of the 12th	La Nuit du 12	Michel Barthelemy
2023 (48th)	Pacifiction	Pacifiction – Tourment sur les îles	Sebastian Vogler
2024 (49th)	The Three Musketeers: D'Artagnan	Les Trois Mousquetaires: D'Artagnan	Stéphane Taillasson
2024 (49th)	The Three Musketeers: Milady	Les Trois Mousquetaires: Milady	Stéphane Taillasson
2024 (49th)	Anatomy of a Fall	Anatomie d'une chute	Emmanuelle Duplay
2024 (49th)	The Animal Kingdom	Le Règne animal	Julia Lemaire
2024 (49th)	Jeanne du Barry		Angelo Zamparutti
2024 (49th)	The Taste of Things	La Passion de Dodin Bouffant	Toma Baquéni
2025 (50th)	The Count of Monte Cristo	Le Comte de Monte-Cristo	Stéphane Taillasson
2025 (50th)	Beating Hearts	L'Amour ouf	Jean-Philippe Moreaux
2025 (50th)	The Divine Sarah Bernhardt	Sarah Bernhardt, la divine	Olivier Radot
2025 (50th)	Emilia Pérez		Emmanuelle Duplay
2025 (50th)	Monsieur Aznavour		Stéphane Rozenbaum
2026 (51st)	The Great Arch	L'Inconnu de la Grande Arche	Catherine Cosme
2026 (51st)	Colours of Time	La Venue de l'avenir	Marie Cheminal
2026 (51st)	Dog 51	Chien 51	Jean-Philippe Moreaux
2026 (51st)	Nouvelle Vague		Katia Wyszkop
2026 (51st)	Once Upon My Mother	Ma mère, Dieu et Sylvie Vartan	Riton Dupire-Clément

== See also ==
- Academy Award for Best Production Design
- BAFTA Award for Best Production Design
- European Film Award for Best Production Designer
- Magritte Award for Best Production Design
