= 15th César Awards =

1990 French film awards ceremony

- Date: 4 March 1990
- Site: Théâtre des Champs-Élysées, Paris, France
- Hosted by: Ève Ruggieri

Highlights
- Best Film: Too Beautiful for You
- Best Actor: Philippe Noiret
- Best Actress: Carole Bouquet

Television coverage
- Network: Antenne 2

The 15th César Awards ceremony, presented by the Académie des Arts et Techniques du Cinéma, honoured the best French films of 1989 and took place on 4 March 1990 at the Théâtre des Champs-Élysées in Paris. The ceremony was chaired by Kirk Douglas and hosted by Ève Ruggieri. Too Beautiful for You won the award for Best Film.

== Winners and nominees ==
The winners are highlighted in bold:

- Best Film:
  **Too Beautiful for You**, directed by Bertrand Blier
  Monsieur Hire, directed by Patrice Leconte
  Nocturne indien, directed by Alain Corneau
  Un monde sans pitié, directed by Eric Rochant
  La Vie et rien d'autre, directed by Bertrand Tavernier
- Best Foreign Film:
  **Dangerous Liaisons**, directed by Stephen Frears
  Dom za vesanje, directed by Emir Kusturica
  Nuovo cinema Paradiso, directed by Giuseppe Tornatore
  Rain Man, directed by Barry Levinson
  Sex, Lies, and Videotape, directed by Steven Soderbergh
- Best First Work:
  **Un monde sans pitié**, directed by Éric Rochant
  Peaux de vaches, directed by Patricia Mazuy
  La Salle de bain, directed by John Lvoff
  La Soule, directed by Michel Sibra
  Suivez cet avion, directed by Patrice Ambard
  Tolérance, directed by Pierre-Henry Salfati
- Best Actor:
  **Philippe Noiret**, for La Vie et rien d'autre
  Lambert Wilson, for Hiver 54, l'abbé Pierre
  Michel Blanc, for Monsieur Hire
  Jean-Hugues Anglade, for Nocturne indien
  Gérard Depardieu, for Trop belle pour toi
  Hippolyte Girardot, for Un monde sans pitié
- Best Actress:
  **Carole Bouquet**, for Trop belle pour toi
  Emmanuelle Béart, for Les Enfants du désordre
  Sandrine Bonnaire, for Monsieur Hire
  Josiane Balasko, for Trop belle pour toi
  Sabine Azéma, for La Vie et rien d'autre
- Best Supporting Actor:
  **Robert Hirsch**, for Hiver 54, l'abbé Pierre
  Jacques Bonnaffé, for Baptême
  François Cluzet, for Force majeure
  Roland Blanche, for Trop belle pour toi
  François Perrot, for La Vie et rien d'autre
- Best Supporting Actress:
  **Suzanne Flon**, for La Vouivre
  Sabine Haudepin, for Force majeure
  Micheline Presle, for I Want to Go Home
  Ludmila Mikaël, for Noce blanche
  Clémentine Célarié, for Nocturne indien
- Most Promising Actor:
  **Yvan Attal**, for Un monde sans pitié
  Jean-Yves Berteloot, for Baptême
  Philippe Volter, for Les Bois noirs
  Thierry Fortineau, for Comédie d'été
  Melvil Poupaud, for La Fille de 15 ans
- Most Promising Actress:
  **Vanessa Paradis**, for Noce blanche
  Valérie Stroh, for Baptême
  Dominique Blanc, for Je suis le seigneur du château
  Isabelle Gélinas, for Suivez cet avion
  Mireille Perrier, for Un monde sans pitié
- Best Director:
  **Bertrand Blier**, for Trop belle pour toi
  Patrice Leconte, for Monsieur Hire
  Alain Corneau, for Nocturne indien
  Miloš Forman, for Valmont
  Bertrand Tavernier, for La Vie et rien d'autre
- Best Original Screenplay or Adaptation:
  **Bertrand Blier**, for Trop belle pour toi
  Pierre Jolivet, Olivier Schatzky, for Force majeure
  Éric Rochant, for Un monde sans pitié
  Bertrand Tavernier, Jean Cosmos, for La Vie et rien d'autre
- Best Cinematography:
  **Yves Angelo**, for Nocturne indien
  Philippe Rousselot, for Trop belle pour toi
  Bruno de Keyzer, for La Vie et rien d'autre
- Best Costume Design:
  **Theodor Pistek**, for Valmont
  Catherine Leterrier, for La Révolution française ("Les Années Lumières" and "Les Années Terribles" segments)
  Jacqueline Moreau, for La Vie et rien d'autre
- Best Sound:
  **Pierre Lenoir, Dominique Hennequin**, for Monsieur Hire
  Claude Villand, Pierre Gamet, for Bunker Palace Hôtel
  Gérard Lamps, William Flageollet, Michel Desrois, for La Vie et rien d'autre
- Best Editing:
  **Claudine Merlin**, for Trop belle pour toi
  Joëlle Hache, Claudine Merlin, for Monsieur Hire
  Armand Psenny, for La Vie et rien d'autre
- Best Music:
  **Oswald d'Andréa**, for La Vie et rien d'autre
  Michael Nyman, for Monsieur Hire
  Gérard Torikian, for Un monde sans pitié
- Best Production Design:
  **Pierre Guffroy**, for Valmont
  Michèle Abbé-Vannier, for Bunker Palace Hôtel
  Théobald Meurisse, for Trop belle pour toi
- Best Animated Short:
  **Le Porte-plume**, directed by Marie-Christine Perrodin
  Sculpture sculptures, directed by Jean-Loup Felicioli
- Best Fiction Short Film:
  **Lune froide**, directed by Patrick Bouchitey
  Ce qui me meut, directed by Cédric Klapisch
  Vol nuptial, directed by Dominique Crèvecoeur
- Best Documentary Short Film:
  **Chanson pour un marin**, directed by Bernard Aubouy
  Le Faucon de Notre-Dame, directed by Claude Farny
- Honorary César:
  **Philippe Dormoy**
  **Gérard Philipe** (posthumous)

== See also ==
- 62nd Academy Awards
- 43rd British Academy Film Awards
