= One Two Two (film) =

1978 film by Christian Gion

- Video cover
- Directed by: Christian Gion
- Written by: Christian Watton; Albert Kantoff
- Based on: One-two-two by Fabienne Jamet
- Produced by: Alain Pancrazi
- Starring: Nicole Calfan; Francis Huster
- Cinematography: Robert Fraisse
- Edited by: Nathalie Lafaurie
- Music by: Ennio Morricone
- Production company: Orphée Arts
- Distributed by: Warner-Columbia Film
- Release date: 26 April 1978
- Running time: 101 minutes
- Country: France
- Language: French
- Box office: $2 million

One Two Two (or One, Two, Two: 122, rue de Provence) is a 1978 French drama film directed by Christian Gion.

== Plot ==
The One-Two-Two, established at 122, rue de Provence, was one of Paris's most luxurious brothels. The film chronicles the eventful daily life of the establishment.

== Cast ==
- Nicole Calfan : Georgette / Fabienne
- Francis Huster : Paul Lardenois
- Jacques François : Bouillaud-Crevel
- Henri Guybet : Marcel Jamet
- Anicée Alvina : Judith
- Catherine Serre : Liza
- Sophie Deschamps : Clarisse
- Nicole Seguin : Doriane
- Michel Peyrelon : Carbone
- Lucien Canezza : Spirito
- René Bouloc : Jo
- Bernard Musson : The President
- Jean-François Dupas : Inspector Bonny
- Denis Héraud : Fouilloux
- Philippe Castelli : The Beret
- Jennifer Bergin : Jennifer
- Lydia Feld : Arletty

== Accolades ==
Year	Award	Category	Recipient	Result
1979	César Awards	César Award for Best Production Design	François de Lamothe	Nominated
