= Xavier Noiret-Thomé =

French painter (born 1971)

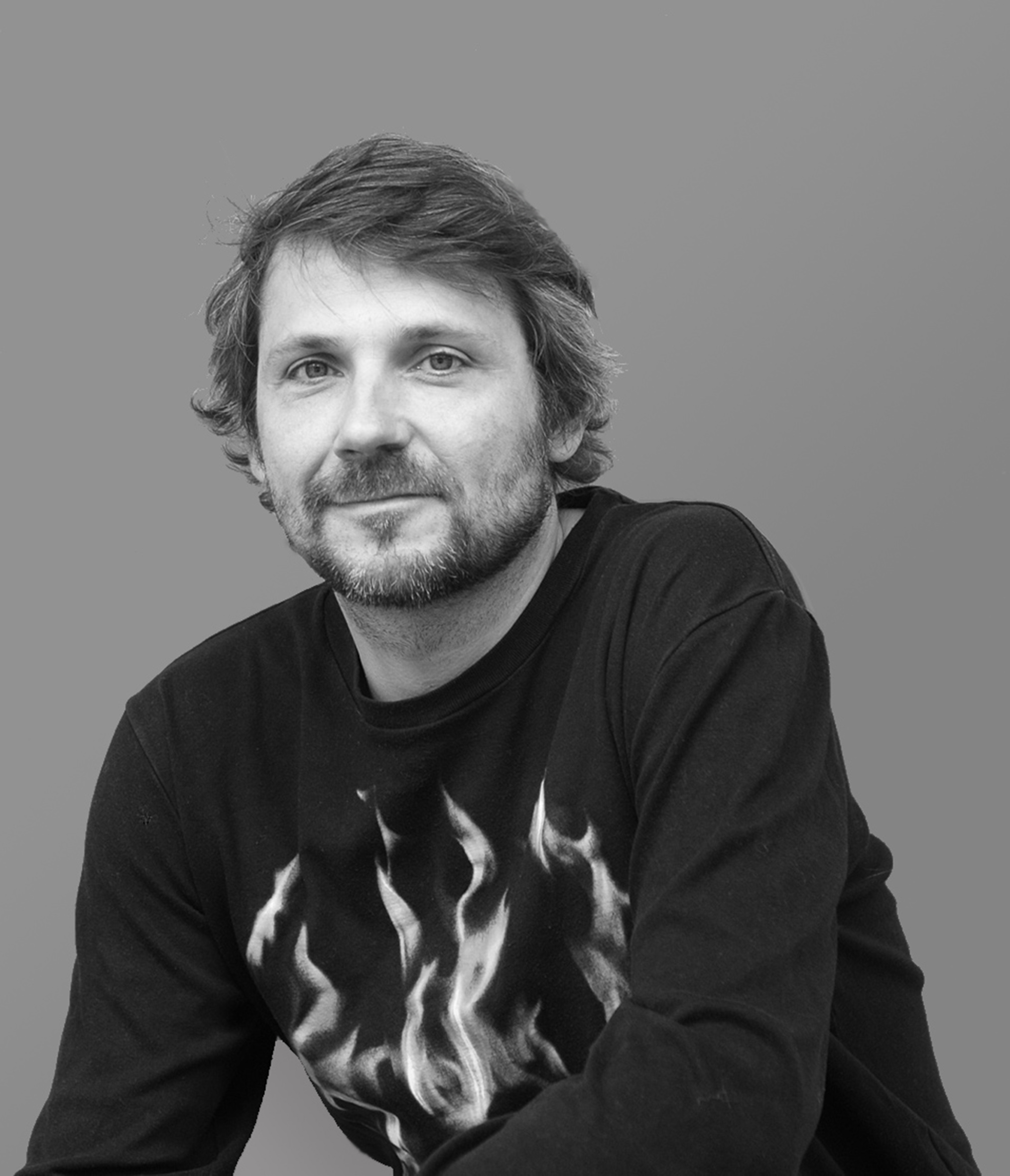
Portrait of Xavier Noiret-Thomé

Xavier Noiret-Thomé (born 2 February 1971 in Charleville-Mézières, Ardennes) is a French painter.

== Career ==
After completing his study of Fine Arts in Rennes in 1995, Xavier Noiret-Thomé spent some time in the Contemporary Art Centre of Domaine de Kerguehennec. From 1996 to 1997, he lived in the residence of Rijksakademie Van Beeldende Kunsten in Amsterdam. In 1999, he got an atelier at the Paul Gauguin Museum, in Pont-Aven. In 2001 he was awarded the Prijs van de Jonge Belgische Schilderkunst (Young Belgian painter prize) by the Académie Royale des Beaux-Arts of Brussels. In 2005 he was chosen by the French Academy in Rome to spend some time in the Villa Médicis. Since 2000, he has worked in Charleville-Mézières and Brussels.

== Bibliography ==
- 1993 : Denys Zacharopoulos, La grandeur inconnue ('Unknown Grandeur'), in Domaine 1993, Ghent, La Chambre
- 1994 : Denys Zacharopoulos, Praxis ('Practice'), in Domaine 1994, Gand, La Chambre
- 1999 : Jean Miniac, Douze études tableaux pour un paysage perdu ('Twelve studies for a lost landscape'), illustrated by Xavier Noiret-Thomé, Éditions Rencontre, Charleville
- 2000 : Jean Miniac, Chroniques des esprits, illustrations de Xavier Noiret-Thomé, Paris, Dumerchez
- 2000 : Denys Zacharopoulos, « La question de la peinture», Dépaysement, Deurle, Musée Dhondt-Dhaenens
- 2001 : Denys Zacharopoulos, « L'énigme de la figure », in Prix de la Jeune Peinture Belge 2001, Antwerp, Fonds Mercator
- 2002 : Jean-Marc Huitorel, «Xavier Noiret-Thomé», in collection Insert, Brussels, La Lettre Volée
- 2003 : Hans Theys, « L'Olympe est un Mont à Charleville-Mézières », in Voir en Peinture, Brussels, La Lettre Volée
- 2004 : Philippe Braem, in catalogue d’exposition No friture, Heidelberg, Das Wunderhorn
- 2004 : « De leur temps, collections privées françaises », catalogue d’exposition, Musée des Beaux-Arts de Tourcoing, l’ADIAF
- 2004 : « CÉLÉBRATION! 20 ans du Frac Champagne-Ardenne », Reims, Le Collège Editions / Frac Champagne-Ardenne
- 2005 : Danielle Orhan, « Harmonies et chaos : la peinture comme rapport de forces », in (suite), Brussels, La Lettre Volée

== Exhibitions ==
=== Individual exhibitions ===
- 1989 : « Idiosycrasie-Idiopathique », Galerie Futur-Interieur, Charleville-Mézières
- 1995 : Centre d'Art Contemporain de la Ferme du Buisson, Noisiel
- 2001 : Galerie-1, Fondation pour l'Architecture, Brussels
- 2001 : Galerie Catherine Bastide, Brussels
- 2002 : Musée Arthur Rimbaud, Charleville-Mézières
- 2002 : « Cycles », Galerie Jennifer Flay, París
- 2003 :« Chroniques/Chromiques «, Galerie Baronian Francey Brussels
- 2004 : « Hypermnésique», Galerie Philippe Casini, París
- 2004 : « Nouvelles Peinture », Galerie Léa Gredt, Luxembourg
- 2005 : Galerie Tanit, Munich
- 2005 : « Pour un concept d'espace-temps», con Michel François, Fri-Art, Fribourg
- 2007: « Recent paintings and sculptures », Galerie Baronian- Francey, Bruxelles
- 2009 : « The Cannibal Parade », galerie Les Filles du Calvaire, Paris
- 2020 : « Panorama », Centrale for Contemporary Art, Bruxelles

=== General exhibitions ===
- 1993 : « La grandeur inconnue », Domaine de Kerguéhennec, Bignan
- 1994 : « Praxis », Domaine de Kerguéhennec, Bignan
- 1996 : « Paint », Galerij Tanya Rumpf, Haarlem
- 1996 : « Open Atelier », Rijksakademie van Beeldende Kunsten, Amsterdam
- 1997 : « Printemps », École Régionale des Beaux-Arts, Rennes
- 1997 : Biennale du Montenegro, Cétinié
- 1997 : « Travaux d'artistes », Alliance française, Rotterdam
- 1997 : « Open Atelier », Rijksakademie van Beeldende Kunsten, Amsterdam
- 1998 : « Les objets contiennent l'infini », Domaine de Kerguéhennec, Bignan
- 1999 : « In Situ », ORCCA, Reims
- 2000 : « Dépaysement I », Domaine de Kerguéhennec, Bignan
- 2000 : « Dépaysement II », Museum Dhondt-Dhaenens, Deurle
- 2000 : « Nouvelles acquisitions », Frac Champagne-Ardennes, Reims
- 2001 : « De la couleur », Musée d'Art Moderne de la ville de Troyes, Troyes
- 2001 : « Ici et Maintenant », Tour & Taxis, Brussels
- 2001 : « Prix de la Jeune Peinture Belge », Centre for Fine Arts, Brussels
- 2002 : « Family Plot », Galerie Baronian-Francey, Brussels
- 2002 : « Looking at Painting I », Galerie Tanit, Munich
- 2003 : « Voir en peinture », Centre d'Art Contemporain Le Plateau, Paris
- 2003 : «932 m³», OPALC, Amberes
- 2004 : « Voir en peinture II », Zamek, Warsaw
- 2004 : « Love is in the air », Matrix art project, Brussels
- 2004 : « Grosse, Majerus, Scheibitz, Noiret-Thomé », Galerie Baronian-Francey, Brussels
- 2004 : « De leur temps, jeunes collections françaises », Musée des Beaux-Arts de Tourcoing
- 2004 : « No friture », Kunstverein Ludwigshafen, Mannheimer Kunstverein
- 2005 : Musée des Beaux-Art de Tourcoing, Tourcoing
- 2005 : "Plat pays en 3 dimensions", Galerie Philippe Casini, Paris
