= Innocent Lies =

1995 UK-France thriller film

- Directed by: Patrick Dewolf
- Written by: Kerry Crabbe; Patrick Dewolf; Agatha Christie (novel)
- Produced by: Philippe Guez; Simon Perry
- Starring: Stephen Dorff; Gabrielle Anwar; Adrian Dunbar; Joanna Lumley
- Cinematography: Patrick Blossier
- Edited by: Joëlle Hache; Chris Wimble
- Music by: Alexandre Desplat
- Production company: PolyGram Filmed Entertainment
- Distributed by: PolyGram Filmed Entertainment (co-distribution with Pan-Européenne in France)
- Release date: 30 June 1995
- Running time: 88 minutes
- Countries: United Kingdom; France
- Languages: English; French

Innocent Lies is a 1995 thriller film directed by Patrick Dewolf and starring Stephen Dorff, Gabrielle Anwar, Adrian Dunbar and Joanna Lumley. It is a loose adaptation of the 1944 Agatha Christie novel Towards Zero. Keira Knightley, in her film debut, plays the younger version of Celia Graves, the character portrayed by Anwar.

== Synopsis ==
In 1938, a British policeman travels to France to investigate the death of one of his colleagues. He becomes interested in a family of wealthy Britons living in a luxurious French coastal resort, who were heavily involved with the dead man. He soon uncovers a number of dark secrets which the family has tried to conceal.

== Cast ==
- Stephen Dorff - Jeremy Graves
- Gabrielle Anwar - Celia Graves
- Adrian Dunbar - Alan Cross
- Sophie Aubry - Solange Montfort
- Joanna Lumley - Lady Helena Graves
- Florence Hoath - Angela Cross
- Alexis Denisof - Christopher Wood
- Marianne Denicourt - Maud Graves
- Melvil Poupaud - Louis Bernard
- Bernard Haller - Georges Montfort
- Rosalind Bennett - Janet Blain
- Donal McCann - Joe Green (Uncredited)

In addition, Keira Knightley portrays a young Celia, while brothers Robin and Tobias Saunders appear as Celia's brothers.

== Release ==
Innocent Lies opened on 24 screens in the United Kingdom on 30 June 1995 and grossed £21,649 in its opening weekend.
