= César Award for Best Cinematography =

French film award

- Country: France
- Presented by: Académie des Arts et Techniques du Cinéma
- First award: 1976
- Currently held by: David Chambille for Nouvelle Vague (2026)
- Website: academie-cinema.org

The César Award for Best Cinematography (French: César de la meilleure photographie) is an award presented annually by the Académie des Arts et Techniques du Cinéma since 1976.

== Winners and nominees ==
=== 1970s ===
| Year | Winner and nominees | Original title | Cinematographer(s) |
|---|---|---|---|
| 1976 (1st) | Black Moon | | Sven Nykvist |
| 1976 (1st) | Call me Savage | Le Sauvage | Pierre Lhomme |
| 1976 (1st) | Flesh of the Orchid | La chair de l'orchidée | Pierre Lhomme |
| 1976 (1st) | The Old Gun | Le Vieux Fusil | Étienne Becker |
| 1977 (2nd) | Barocco | | Bruno Nuytten |
| 1977 (2nd) | The Best Way to Walk | La Meilleure Façon de marcher | Bruno Nuytten |
| 1977 (2nd) | Docteur Françoise Gailland | Docteur Françoise Gailland | Claude Renoir |
| 1977 (2nd) | The Faithful Woman | Une femme fidèle | Claude Renoir |
| 1977 (2nd) | Mr. Klein | Monsieur Klein | Gerry Fisher |
| 1977 (2nd) | The Toy | Le Jouet | Étienne Becker |
| 1978 (3rd) | Drummer-Crab | Le Crabe-Tambour | Raoul Coutard |
| 1978 (3rd) | The Accuser | L'Imprécateur | Andréas Winding |
| 1978 (3rd) | Providence | | Ricardo Aronovich |
| 1978 (3rd) | This Sweet Sickness | Dites-lui que je l'aime | Pierre Lhomme |
| 1979 (4th) | Molière | | Bernard Zitzermann |
| 1979 (4th) | The Green Room | La Chambre verte | Néstor Almendros |
| 1979 (4th) | Judith Therpauve | | Pierre Lhomme |
| 1979 (4th) | A Simple Story | Une histoire simple | Jean Boffety |

=== 1980s ===
| Year | Winner and nominees | Original title | Cinematographer(s) |
|---|---|---|---|
| 1980 (5th) | Tess | | Ghislain Cloquet |
| 1980 (5th) | The Brontë Sisters | Les Sœurs Brontë | Bruno Nuytten |
| 1980 (5th) | Cold Cuts | Buffet froid | Jean Penzer |
| 1980 (5th) | Perceval le Gallois | | Néstor Almendros |
| 1981 (6th) | The Last Metro | Le Dernier Métro | Néstor Almendros |
| 1981 (6th) | Death Watch | La Mort en direct | Pierre-William Glenn |
| 1981 (6th) | My American Uncle | Mon oncle d'Amérique | Sacha Vierny |
| 1981 (6th) | The Woman Banker | La Banquière | Bernard Zitzermann |
| 1982 (7th) | Diva | | Philippe Rousselot |
| 1982 (7th) | Malevil | | Jean Penzer |
| 1982 (7th) | Quest for Fire | La Guerre du feu | Claude Agostini |
| 1982 (7th) | Under Suspicion | Garde à vue | Bruno Nuytten |
| 1983 (8th) | The Trout | La Truite | Henri Alekan |
| 1983 (8th) | Les Misérables | | Edmond Richard |
| 1983 (8th) | Passion | | Raoul Coutard |
| 1983 (8th) | A Room in Town | Une chambre en ville | Jean Penzer |
| 1984 (9th) | So Long, Stooge | Tchao Pantin | Bruno Nuytten |
| 1984 (9th) | The Ball | Le bal | Ricardo Aronovich |
| 1984 (9th) | Deadly Run | Mortelle randonnée | Pierre Lhomme |
| 1984 (9th) | Moon in the Gutter | La Lune dans le caniveau | Philippe Rousselot |
| 1985 (10th) | A Sunday in the Country | Un dimanche à la campagne | Bruno de Keyzer |
| 1985 (10th) | Carmen | | Pasqualino De Santis |
| 1985 (10th) | Fort Saganne | | Bruno Nuytten |
| 1985 (10th) | Love Unto Death | L'Amour à mort | Sacha Vierny |
| 1986 (11th) | He Died with His Eyes Open | On ne meurt que 2 fois | Jean Penzer |
| 1986 (11th) | Harem | | Pasqualino De Santis |
| 1986 (11th) | Rendez-vous | | Renato Berta |
| 1986 (11th) | Subway | | Carlo Varini |
| 1987 (12th) | Thérèse | | Philippe Rousselot |
| 1987 (12th) | Bad Blood | Mauvais sang | Jean-Yves Escoffier |
| 1987 (12th) | Jean de Florette | | Bruno Nuytten |
| 1987 (12th) | Mélo | | Charles Van Damme |
| 1988 (13th) | Goodbye, Children | Au revoir les enfants | Renato Berta |
| 1988 (13th) | Miss Mona | | Patrick Blossier |
| 1988 (13th) | Under the Sun of Satan | Sous le soleil de Satan | Willy Kurant |
| 1989 (14th) | Camille Claudel | | Pierre Lhomme |
| 1989 (14th) | The Bear | L'Ours | Philippe Rousselot |
| 1989 (14th) | The Big Blue | Le Grand Bleu | Carlo Varini |

=== 1990s ===
| Year | Winner and nominees | Original title | Cinematographer(s) |
|---|---|---|---|
| 1990 (15th) | Indian Nocturne | Nocturne indien | Yves Angelo |
| 1990 (15th) | Life and Nothing But | La vie et rien d'autre | Bruno de Keyzer |
| 1990 (15th) | Too Beautiful for You | Trop belle pour toi | Philippe Rousselot |
| 1991 (16th) | Cyrano de Bergerac | | Pierre Lhomme |
| 1991 (16th) | The Hairdresser's Husband | Le Mari de la coiffeuse | Eduardo Serra |
| 1991 (16th) | La Femme Nikita | Nikita | Thierry Arbogast |
| 1992 (17th) | All the Mornings of the World | Tous les matins du monde | Yves Angelo |
| 1992 (17th) | Delicatessen | | Darius Khondji |
| 1992 (17th) | Van Gogh | | Gilles Henry and Emmanuel Machuel |
| 1993 (18th) | Indochine | | François Catonné |
| 1993 (18th) | The Accompanist; A Heart in Winter | Un cœur en hiver | Yves Angelo |
| 1993 (18th) | The Lover | L'Amant | Robert Fraisse |
| 1994 (19th) | Germinal | | Yves Angelo |
| 1994 (19th) | Smoking/No Smoking | | Renato Berta |
| 1994 (19th) | Three Colors: Blue | Trois couleurs: Bleu | Sławomir Idziak |
| 1995 (20th) | La Reine Margot | | Philippe Rousselot |
| 1995 (20th) | Colonel Chabert | Le Colonel Chabert | Bernard Lutic |
| 1995 (20th) | Léon | | Thierry Arbogast |
| 1996 (21st) | The Horseman on the Roof | Le Hussard sur le toit | Thierry Arbogast |
| 1996 (21st) | The City of Lost Children | La Cité des enfants perdus | Darius Khondji |
| 1996 (21st) | Hate | La Haine | Pierre Aïm |
| 1997 (22nd) | Microcosmos | Microcosmos: le peuple de l'herbe | Claude Nuridsany and Marie Perennou |
| 1997 (22nd) | Ridicule | | Thierry Arbogast |
| 1997 (22nd) | Unpredictable Nature of the River | Les Caprices d'un fleuve | Jean-Marie Dreujou |
| 1998 (23rd) | The Fifth Element | | Thierry Arbogast |
| 1998 (23rd) | Artemisia | | Benoît Delhomme |
| 1998 (23rd) | On Guard | Le Bossu | Jean-François Robin |
| 1999 (24th) | Those Who Love Me Can Take the Train | Ceux qui m'aiment prendront le train | Éric Gautier |
| 1999 (24th) | The Dreamlife of Angels | La Vie rêvée des anges | Agnès Godard |
| 1999 (24th) | Place Vendôme | | Laurent Dailland |

=== 2000s ===
| Year | Winner and nominees | Original title | Cinematographer(s) |
|---|---|---|---|
| 2000 (25th) | Himalaya | Himalaya, l'enfance d'un chef | Éric Guichard |
| 2000 (25th) | Girl on the Bridge | La Fille sur le pont | Jean-Marie Dreujou |
| 2000 (25th) | The Messenger: The Story of Joan of Arc | | Thierry Arbogast |
| 2001 (26th) | Good Work | Beau travail | Agnès Godard |
| 2001 (26th) | The Crimson Rivers | Les Rivières pourpres | Thierry Arbogast |
| 2001 (26th) | Sentimental Destinies | Les Destinées sentimentales | Éric Gautier |
| 2002 (27th) | The Officers' Ward | La Chambre des officiers | Tetsuo Nagata |
| 2002 (27th) | Amélie | Le Fabuleux Destin d'Amélie Poulain | Bruno Delbonnel |
| 2002 (27th) | Read My Lips | Sur mes lèvres | Mathieu Vadepied |
| 2003 (28th) | The Pianist | | Paweł Edelman |
| 2003 (28th) | 8 Women | 8 femmes | Jeanne Lapoirie |
| 2003 (28th) | Amen. | | Patrick Blossier |
| 2004 (29th) | Bon voyage | | Thierry Arbogast |
| 2004 (29th) | Mr. N | Monsieur N. | Pierre Aïm |
| 2004 (29th) | Strayed | Les Égarés | Agnès Godard |
| 2005 (30th) | A Very Long Engagement | Un long dimanche de fiançailles | Bruno Delbonnel |
| 2005 (30th) | Clean | | Éric Gautier |
| 2005 (30th) | Two Brothers | Deux frères | Jean-Marie Dreujou |
| 2006 (31st) | The Beat That My Heart Skipped | De battre mon cœur s'est arrêté | Stéphane Fontaine |
| 2006 (31st) | Gabrielle | | Éric Gautier |
| 2006 (31st) | Regular Lovers | Les Amants réguliers | William Lubtchansky |
| 2007 (32nd) | Lady Chatterley | | Julien Hirsch |
| 2007 (32nd) | Days of Glory | Indigènes | Patrick Blossier |
| 2007 (32nd) | OSS 117: Cairo, Nest of Spies | OSS 117: Le Caire, nid d'espions | Guillaume Schiffman |
| 2007 (32nd) | Private Fears in Public Places | Cœurs | Éric Gautier |
| 2007 (32nd) | Tell No One | Ne le dis à personne | Christophe Offenstein |
| 2008 (33rd) | La Vie en Rose | La môme | Tetsuo Nagata |
| 2008 (33rd) | The Diving Bell and the Butterfly | Le Scaphandre et le papillon | Janusz Kamiński |
| 2008 (33rd) | The Second Wind | Le Deuxième Souffle | Yves Angelo |
| 2008 (33rd) | Intimate Enemies | L'Ennemi intime | Giovanni Fiore Coltellacci |
| 2008 (33rd) | A Secret | Un secret | Gérard de Battista |
| 2009 (34th) | Séraphine | | Laurent Brunet |
| 2009 (34th) | A Christmas Tale | Un conte de Noël | Éric Gautier |
| 2009 (34th) | Home | | Agnès Godard |
| 2009 (34th) | Paris 36 | Faubourg 36 | Tom Stern |
| 2009 (34th) | Public Enemy Number One: Part 1 and 2 | L'Instinct de mort and L'Ennemi public n°1 | Robert Gantz |

=== 2010s ===
| Year | Winner and nominees | Original title | Cinematographer(s) |
|---|---|---|---|
| 2010 (35th) | A Prophet | Un prophète | Stéphane Fontaine |
| 2010 (35th) | Coco Before Chanel | Coco avant Chanel | Christophe Beaucarne |
| 2010 (35th) | Welcome | | Laurent Dailland |
| 2010 (35th) | Wild Grass | Les Herbes folles | Éric Gautier |
| 2010 (35th) | In the Beginning | À l'origine | Glynn Speeckaert |
| 2011 (36th) | Of Gods and Men | Des hommes et des dieux | Caroline Champetier |
| 2011 (36th) | On Tour | Tournée | Christophe Beaucarne |
| 2011 (36th) | The Ghost Writer | | Paweł Edelman |
| 2011 (36th) | The Princess of Montpensier | La Princesse de Montpensier | Bruno de Keyzer |
| 2011 (36th) | Gainsbourg (Vie héroïque) | | Guillaume Schiffman |
| 2012 (37th) | The Artist | | Guillaume Schiffman |
| 2012 (37th) | Polisse | | Pierre Aïm |
| 2012 (37th) | House of Tolerance | L'Apollonide: Souvenirs de la maison close | Josée Deshaies |
| 2012 (37th) | The Minister | L'Exercice de l'État | Julien Hirsch |
| 2012 (37th) | The Intouchables | Intouchables | Mathieu Vadepied |
| 2013 (38th) | Farewell, My Queen | Les Adieux à la reine | Romain Winding |
| 2013 (38th) | Holy Motors | | Caroline Champetier |
| 2013 (38th) | Rust and Bone | De rouille et d'os | Stéphane Fontaine |
| 2013 (38th) | Amour | | Darius Khondji |
| 2013 (38th) | Populaire | | Guillaume Schiffman |
| 2014 (39th) | The Young and Prodigious T.S. Spivet | | Thomas Hardmeier |
| 2014 (39th) | Blue Is the Warmest Colour | La Vie d'Adèle – Chapitres 1 & 2 | Sofian El Fani |
| 2014 (39th) | Age of Uprising: The Legend of Michael Kohlhaas | Michael Kohlhaas | Jeanne Lapoirie |
| 2014 (39th) | Stranger by the Lake | L'Inconnu du lac | Claire Mathon |
| 2014 (39th) | Renoir | | Mark Lee Ping Bin |
| 2015 (40th) | Timbuktu | | Sofian El Fani |
| 2015 (40th) | Beauty and the Beast | La Belle et la Bête | Christophe Beaucarne |
| 2015 (40th) | Saint Laurent | | Josée Deshaies |
| 2015 (40th) | Clouds of Sils Maria | Sils Maria | Yorick Le Saux |
| 2015 (40th) | Yves Saint Laurent | | Thomas Hardmeier |
| 2016 (41st) | Valley of Love | | Christophe Offenstein |
| 2016 (41st) | Dheepan | | Eponine Momenceau |
| 2016 (41st) | Marguerite | | Glynn Speeckaert |
| 2016 (41st) | Mustang | | David Chizallet and Ersin Gök |
| 2016 (41st) | My Golden Days | Trois souvenirs de ma jeunesse | Irina Lubtchansky |
| 2017 (42nd) | Frantz | | Pascal Marti |
| 2017 (42nd) | Elle | | Stéphane Fontaine |
| 2017 (42nd) | The Innocents | Les Innocentes | Caroline Champetier |
| 2017 (42nd) | Slack Bay | Ma Loute | Guillaume Deffontaines |
| 2017 (42nd) | From the Land of the Moon | Mal de pierres | Christophe Beaucarne |
| 2018 (43rd) | See You Up There | Au Revoir Là-Haut | Vincent Mathias |
| 2018 (43rd) | BPM (Beats per Minute) | 120 Battements par Minute | Jeanne Lapoirie |
| 2018 (43rd) | Barbara | | Christophe Beaucarne |
| 2018 (43rd) | The Guardians | Les Gardiennes | Caroline Champetier |
| 2018 (43rd) | Redoubtable | Le Redoutable | Guillaume Schiffman |
| 2019 (44th) | The Sisters Brothers | | Benoît Debie |
| 2019 (44th) | Lady J | Mademoiselle de Joncquières | Laurent Desmet |
| 2019 (44th) | Sink or Swim | Le Grand Bain | Laurent Tangy |
| 2019 (44th) | Memoir of War | La douleur | Alexis Kavyrchine |
| 2019 (44th) | Custody | Jusqu'à la garde | Nathalie Durand |

=== 2020s ===
| Year | Winner and nominees | Original title | Cinematographer(s) |
|---|---|---|---|
| 2020 (45th) | Portrait of a Lady on Fire | Portrait de la jeune fille en feu | Claire Mathon |
| 2020 (45th) | La Belle Époque | | Nicolas Bolduc |
| 2020 (45th) | An Officer and a Spy | J'accuse | Paweł Edelman |
| 2020 (45th) | Les Misérables | | Julien Poupard |
| 2020 (45th) | Oh Mercy! | Roubaix, une lumière | Irina Lubtchansky |
| 2021 (46th) | Bye Bye Morons | Adieu les cons | Alexis Kavyrchine |
| 2021 (46th) | Adolescents | Adolescentes | Antoine Parouty and Paul Guilhaume |
| 2021 (46th) | My Donkey, My Lover & I | Antoinette dans les Cévennes | Simon Beaufils |
| 2021 (46th) | Love Affair(s) | Les Choses qu'on dit, les choses qu'on fait | Laurent Desmet |
| 2021 (46th) | Summer of 85 | Été 85 | Hichame Alaouié |
| 2022 (47th) | Lost Illusions | Illusions perdues | Christophe Beaucarne |
| 2022 (47th) | Annette | | Caroline Champetier |
| 2022 (47th) | Onoda: 10,000 Nights in the Jungle | Onoda, 10 000 nuits dans la jungle | Tom Harar |
| 2022 (47th) | Paris, 13th District | Les Olympiades | Paul Guilhaume |
| 2022 (47th) | Titane | | Ruben Impens |
| 2023 (48th) | Pacifiction | Pacifiction – Tourment sur les îles | Artur Tort |
| 2023 (48th) | Forever Young | Les Amandiers | Julien Poupard |
| 2023 (48th) | The Night of the 12th | La Nuit du 12 | Patrick Ghiringhelli |
| 2023 (48th) | Rise | En corps | Alexis Kavyrchine |
| 2023 (48th) | Saint Omer | | Claire Mathon |
| 2024 (49th) | The Animal Kingdom | Le Règne animal | David Cailley |
| 2024 (49th) | Anatomy of a Fall | Anatomie d'une chute | Simon Beaufils |
| 2024 (49th) | The Goldman Case | Le Procès Goldman | Patrick Ghiringhelli |
| 2024 (49th) | The Taste of Things | La Passion de Dodin Bouffant | Jonathan Ricquebourg |
| 2024 (49th) | The Three Musketeers: D'Artagnan and The Three Musketeers: Milady | Les Trois Mousquetaires: D'Artagnan et Les Trois Mousquetaires: Milady | Nicolas Bolduc |
| 2025 (50th) | Emilia Pérez | | Paul Guilhaume |
| 2025 (50th) | Beating Hearts | L'Amour ouf | Laurent Tangy |
| 2025 (50th) | The Count of Monte Cristo | Le Comte de Monte-Cristo | Nicolas Bolduc |
| 2025 (50th) | Misericordia | Miséricorde | Claire Mathon |
| 2025 (50th) | Souleymane's Story | L'Histoire de Souleymane | Tristan Galand |
| 2026 (51st) | Nouvelle Vague | | David Chambille |
| 2026 (51st) | Case 137 | Dossier 137 | Patrick Ghiringhelli |
| 2026 (51st) | The Girl in the Snow | L'engloutie | Marine Atlan |
| 2026 (51st) | The Stranger | L'Étranger | Manuel Dacosse |
| 2026 (51st) | The Ties That Bind Us | L'Attachement | Elin Kirschfink |

== See also ==
- Lumière Award for Best Cinematography
- Academy Award for Best Cinematography
- BAFTA Award for Best Cinematography
- Magritte Award for Best Cinematography
