= Agent trouble =

1987 film

- Directed by: Jean-Pierre Mocky
- Written by: Malcolm Bosse (novel); Jean-Pierre Mocky
- Produced by: Maurice Bernart; Jean-Pierre Mocky
- Starring: Catherine Deneuve; Richard Bohringer
- Cinematography: William Lubtchansky
- Edited by: Jean-Pierre Mocky; Bénédicte Teiger
- Music by: Gabriel Yared
- Production companies: A.F.C. Koala Films; FR3 Films Production; Canal Plus Productions
- Distributed by: BAC Films
- Release date: 19 August 1987
- Running time: 90 minutes
- Country: France
- Language: French
- Box office: $3.8 million

Agent trouble is a 1987 French film directed by Jean-Pierre Mocky and starring Catherine Deneuve. It is based on the novel The Man Who Loved Zoos by Malcolm Bosse. Dominique Lavanant won the César Award for Best Actress in a Supporting Role for her performance in the film. The film was also nominated at the 1988 César Awards for Best Actress, Best Supporting Actor and Best Music.

== Plot ==
Amanda Weber is a museum employee. Her nephew, Victorien, who feels that wild animals should not be kept in zoos, has been murdered, and she seeks to find out why and how. She knows that Victorien was witness to a mysterious government project where 50 tourists were killed by an unknown poison gas, and the bus they were travelling in was found at the bottom of a lake. Alex, a callous government assassin who is having relationship problems with his employee and mistress Delphine, has orders to kill anyone who knows about the cover-up of that project, and Amanda soon becomes his target.

== Cast ==
- Catherine Deneuve - Amanda Weber
- Richard Bohringer - Alex
- Tom Novembre - Victorien
- Dominique Lavanant - Catherine 'Karen' Dariller
- Sophie Moyse - Delphine
- Kristin Scott Thomas - Julie
- Sylvie Joly - Edna
- Héléna Manson - Madame Sackman
- Hervé Pauchon - Tony
- Charles Varel - Norbert
- Maxime Leroux - Doctor Arms
- Pierre Arditi - Stanislas Gautier
- Antoine Mayor - Tintin
- Michel Varille - Tony's boyfriend
- Jacques Boudet - The writer
- Isabelle Mergault - The waitress
- Dominique Zardi - The guardian

== Production ==
Principal photography began on 21 February 1987. Shooting took place in the Chamonix valley (Haute-Savoie) and the Cormet d'Arêches-Beaufort (Savoie), as well as in hills of Orbey (Haut-Rhin) and around Haut-Koenigsbourg, notably at the eagle sanctuary on the hills of Kintzheim (Bas-Rhin).

== Discography ==
The CD soundtrack composed by Gabriel Yared is available on Music Box Records label (website).
