= Denys Zacharopoulos =

Greek theorist and art historian (1952–2026)

Denys Zacharopoulos (Greek: Ντένης Ζαχαρόπουλος; 11 June 1952 – 4 October 2026) was a Greek art historian and theorist. He worked as Professor of Art History, author, and curator, amongst other venues at the 48th Venice Biennale in Venice and documenta IX in Kassel, Germany.

== Life and career ==
Zacharopoulos studied music in Athens and from 1970 in France literature, semantics and philosophy, followed by history and sociology of the arts and in literature. His teachers were Jean Cassou, Gaëtan Picon, Louis Marin and Roland Barthes. He lived in France and became a French citizen. From 2000 on, he lived in Greece.

In 1975, Zacharopoulos became program coordinator of the Institute of Contemporary Arts in London, England. He then spent time in New York and taught as Professor in the Academies of Fine Arts in Geneva, Vienna, and Amsterdam.

During this period he forged intensive personal contacts to many contemporary artists of his generation, in particular to James Welling, Matt Mullican, Ernst Caramelle, Jean-Marc Bustamante, Juan Muñoz, Thomas Schütte and Reinhard Mucha.

Zacharopoulos died on 4 October 2026, at the age of 74.

== Professional activities ==
Zacharopouls' first major works centered on the Arte Povera movement. He curated a long series of exhibitions in major museums in Europe and the United States. From 2001 on, he published extensively and curated intensively many exhibitions on the artistic production and the issue of Avantgarde in Greece in the second half of the 20th century.

- Director of the Domaine de Kerguehennec, in France (1992–1999)
- Co-director with Jan Hoet of documenta IX in Kassel, Germany (1992)
- General inspector for contemporary art in the French Ministry for Culture (1999)
- Curator of the French Pavilion at the 48th Biennale in Venice (1999)
- Visiting professor at the École Supérieure des Arts Visuels (ESAV) in Geneva (1985–1991)
- Professor at the Rijksakademie van Beeldende Kunsten in Amsterdam, the Netherlands (1996–2005)
- Professor for art history and art theory at the Aegean University in Lesvos, Greece (2002–2010)
- Artistic director of the Macedonian Museums for Contemporary Art, Thessalonica (2006).

== Publications ==
From 1977, Zacharopoulos contributed art critiques to; Artforum (New York); Artistes (Paris); Arti (Athens); Parkett (Zurich); Furor (Geneva); Faces (Geneva); Museumjournal (Amsterdam); Art e Dossier (Rome); Artstudio (Paris); Juliett (Trieste); Acrobat Mime Parfait (Bologna); Teuchos and Artime (both Athens).

Numerous catalogues and theoretical publications he authored include; with particular emphasis on the following artists: Gerhard Richter, Mario Merz, Gilberto Zorio, Iannis Kounellis, Per Kirkeby, Eugene Leroy, Michelangelo Pistoletto, Pat Steir, Carl Andre, Mariella Simoni, Pierpaolo Calzolari, Jean-Pierre Bertrand, Marina Abramović, Lothar Baumgarten, Marisa Merz, Jean-Marc Bustamante, Matt Mullican, Thomas Schütte, Jan Vercruysse, Helmut Dorner, Gaylen Gerber, Harald Klingelhöller, Franz West, Jim Lutes, Tadashi Kawamata, Reinhard Mucha, Adrian Schiess, Herbert Brandl, Jimmy Durham, Michel François, Eran Schaerf, Xavier Noiret-Thomé.

== Bibliography ==
- Denys Zacharopoulos/Ulrich Look, "Gerhard Richter", S. Schreiber, Munich, 1984
- "Reinhard Mucha: Das Figur/Grund Problem in der Architektur des Barocks", Kunstverein, Stuttgart 1985.
- "Per Kirkeby", Musée Saint-Pierre, Lyon, 1987
- "Gerhard Richter", Liliane & Michel Durand-Dessert, Paris 1991.
- "Jean-Marc Bustamante", Kröller-Müller, Otteloo, 1994
- "Per Kirkeby", Arts Club, Chicago, 2007
- "Xavier Noiret-Thomé", Analogues, maison d'édition pour l'art contemporain, Arles, 2013

== Awards and honours ==
- Chevalier des Arts et des Lettres of the French Republic
- Austrian Cross of Honour for Science and Art (2002)
