= Jacques Cousseau =

French writer, screenwriter, and actor

Jacques Cousseau (10 May 1925 in Morocco – 24 September 2017 in Paris), was a French writer, screenwriter and actor

== Bibliography ==
- 1956: Temps chaud, Coréa
- 1957: Le chien gris, Buchet/Chastel
- 1958: Le Vieux Pocco, Buchet/Chastel
- 1960: Les Singes, Buchet/Chastel
- 1962: La Morte, éditions Julliard
- 1966: L'Éblouissement, éditions Gallimard

== Filmography ==
Screenwriter

- 1967: If I Were a Spy by Bertrand Blier

== Theatre ==
- 1948: Le Cirque aux illusions by René Aubert, directed by Jan Doat, Théâtre Mouffetard
