= Love Without Pity =

- Directed by: Éric Rochant
- Written by: Éric Rochant
- Produced by: Alain Rocca
- Starring: Hippolyte Girardot; Mireille Perrier; Yvan Attal
- Cinematography: Pierre Novion
- Edited by: Michèle Darmon
- Music by: Gérard Torikian
- Production companies: Les Productions Lazennec; Gérard Mital Productions; SGCC/Jean-Bernard Fetoux; Christian Bourgois Productions; FR3 Films Production
- Distributed by: UGC Distribution
- Release date: 22 November 1989
- Running time: 84 minutes
- Country: France
- Language: French
- Box office: $7.8 million

Love Without Pity (French title: Un monde sans pitié) is a 1989 French romantic comedy film written and directed by Éric Rochant.

== Cast ==
- Hippolyte Girardot as Hippo
- Mireille Perrier as Nathalie
- Yvan Attal as Halpern
- Jean-Marie Rollin as Xavier
- Cécile Mazan as Francine
- Aline Still as La mère
- Paul Pavel as Le père
- Anne Kessler as Adeline
- Patrick Blondel as J.F.
- Paul Bisciglia as L'homme de L'Humanité

== Accolades ==
Award / Film Festival	Category	Recipients and nominees	Result
15th César Awards	Best Film	Love Without Pity	Nominated
15th César Awards	Best Actor	Hippolyte Girardot	Nominated
15th César Awards	Most Promising Actor	Yvan Attal	Won
15th César Awards	Most Promising Actress	Mireille Perrier	Nominated
15th César Awards	Best Original Screenplay or Adaptation	Éric Rochant	Nominated
15th César Awards	Best Music	Gérard Torikian	Nominated
15th César Awards	Best First Feature Film	Love Without Pity	Won
3rd European Film Awards	European Discovery of the Year	Love Without Pity	Nominated
Louis Delluc Prize	Best Film	Love Without Pity	Won
Venice Film Festival	International Critics’ Week FIPRESCI Prize	Love Without Pity	Won
Venice Film Festival	Kodak-Cinecritica Award	Éric Rochant	Won
