= He Died with His Eyes Open =

1985 film by Jacques Deray

- Theatrical release poster
- French: On ne meurt que deux fois
- Directed by: Jacques Deray
- Screenplay by: Jacques Deray; Michel Audiard
- Dialogue by: Michel Audiard
- Based on: He Died with His Eyes Open by Derek Raymond
- Produced by: Jacques Deray
- Starring: Michel Serrault; Charlotte Rampling; Xavier Deluc; Élisabeth Depardieu; Julie Jézéquel; Gérard Darmon; Jean-Pierre Bacri
- Cinematography: Jean Penzer
- Edited by: Henri Lanoë
- Music by: Claude Bolling
- Production companies: Swanie Productions; TF1 Films Production
- Distributed by: UGC Distribution
- Release dates: 27 August 1985 (Montreal); 9 October 1985 (France)
- Running time: 105 minutes
- Country: France
- Language: French
- Box office: $7.5 million

He Died with His Eyes Open (French: On ne meurt que deux fois, lit. 'You Only Die Twice') is a 1985 French neo-noir erotic thriller film directed by Jacques Deray from a screenplay he co-wrote with Michel Audiard, based on the 1984 novel of the same name by Derek Raymond. It stars Michel Serrault and Charlotte Rampling. The film won the César Award for Best Cinematography, while Serrault and Rampling were nominated for Best Actor and Best Actress, respectively.

== Plot ==
Charly Berliner, a pianist, is found dead beside a railway track. The inspector in charge of the investigation, Robert Staniland, arrives at the victim's home to search for clues. As he listens to the tapes recorded by Berliner in which he confesses his love for a mysterious woman named Barbara, the latter turns up unexpectedly and confesses to the crime.

== Cast ==
- Michel Serrault as Inspector Robert Staniland
- Charlotte Rampling as Barbara Spark
- Xavier Deluc as Marc Spark
- Élisabeth Depardieu as Margo Berliner
- Jean-Paul Roussillon as Léonce
- Jean-Pierre Darroussin as Moulard
- Julie Jézéquel as Sophie
- Albert Delpy as the forensic scientist
- Riton Liebman as Éric Berliner
- Gérard Darmon as Jean-Loup Soeren
- Jean-Pierre Bacri as the barman

== Production ==
Principal photography began from 2 January 1985.

== Accolades ==
Award / Film Festival	Category	Recipients and nominees	Result
César Awards	Best Actor	Michel Serrault	Nominated
César Awards	Best Actress	Charlotte Rampling	Nominated
César Awards	Best Supporting Actor	Xavier Deluc	Nominated
César Awards	Best Original Screenplay or Adaptation	Michel Audiard and Jacques Deray	Nominated
César Awards	Best Cinematography	Jean Penzer	Won
César Awards	Best Original Music	Claude Bolling	Nominated
César Awards	Best Editing	Henri Lanoë	Nominated
César Awards	Best Production Design	François de Lamothe	Nominated
Montreal World Film Festival	Jury Prize		Won
