= Jean Rabasse =

French cinema set decorator and scenographer

Jean Rabasse (born in 1961 in Tlemcen, French Algeria) is a French cinema set decorator and scenographer.

== Biography ==
Jean Rabasse has long worked with the DCA Company of Philippe Decouflé for whom he created stage objects and machines. Since the start of the 1990s he has worked as a production designer in film.

== Filmography ==
- Vortex (2021)
- Oxygen (2021)
- An Officer and a Spy (2019)
- A Faithful Man (2018)
- Climax (2018)
- Based on a True Story (2017)
- Jackie (2016)
- Two Friends (2015)
- Venus in Fur (2012)
- Me and You (2012)
- Oceans (2009) documentary
- Paris 36 (2008)
- The Statement (2003)
- The Dreamers (2003)
- Vidocq (2001)
- Vatel (2000)
- Asterix and Obelix vs. Caesar (1999)
- The City of Lost Children (1995)
- Je m'appelle Victor (1993)

== Awards ==
- 2001 : César Award for Best Production Design for Vatel.
- 2000 : Oscar nomination for best artistic direction for Vatel.
- 1996 : César Award for Best Production Design for La Cité des enfants perdus.
