= René-Charles de Breslay =

René-Charles de Breslay (June 1658 – 4 December 1735) was born and educated in France where he spent a number of years as “gentleman in waiting of the privy chamber of the king”. Following this period, he entered the order of Saint-Sulpice and became a Sulpician in 1689.

== Life ==
=== Montreal ===
Breslay came to New France in 1694 and was stationed in Montreal, first as a curate and then as a parish priest at Notre-Dame. He became fluent in Algonquin and in March 1703 moved as parish priest to the Saint-Louis Mission in Sainte-Anne-du-bout-de-l'Ile and succeeded François-Saturnin Lascaris d'Urfé. This parish was initially located at the western end of Montreal Island at Pointe-Caron (he present-day Baie-d'Urfé Yacht Club). He was able to establish an Algonquin mission at Île-aux-Tourtres, a project much promoted and planned for by another Sulpician, Michel Barthélemy. Around 1703, Breslay moved the mission from Baie d'Urfé to Isle aux tourtes, for the Nipissing Indians.

Around 1712, Breslay got caught in a fierce snowstorm. He fell from his horse, broke his leg on the ice, and lost the horse. Breslay invoked Saint Anne and built a chapel dedicated to her at the westernmost point of Montreal Island next to Fort Senneville and Tourtes Island (Île aux Tourtes). Two years later, the parish was reestablished and took the name Sainte-Anne-du-bout-de-l'Isle. He also served the mission church Saint-Joachim de Pointe-Claire.

Breslay spent 16 years serving that area during which he was involved in three important events: the establishment of a new parish of St. Anne, his interactions with Governor Philippe de Rigaud Vaudreuil regarding the brandy question, and third his assistance to François Dollier de Casson with the canal project to bypass Sault-Saint-Louis.

=== Île Saint Jean ===
Father Breslay went to France in (1719–20) to discuss his missions and the brandy problem. There, he met the Comte de Saint-Pierre who had been granted the lands then known as Île Saint Jean and Breslay was recruited to be the first parish priest on Île Saint Jean (Prince Edward Island), which also involved serving at Beaubassin as a missionary priest to the Miꞌkmaq.

At the same time, he was made vicar general of the bishopric of Quebec. In 1721 he arrived with another Sulpician, Marie-Anselme de Metivier on Île Saint Jean and together they began the structure of what became the Roman Catholic Diocese of Charlottetown. They arrived at Port-LaJoye in early spring and built a small church dedicated to St. John the Evangelist. After two years they handed over the parish on St. John's Island to the Franciscans of Louisbourg.

After another voyage to France in 1723, Breslay served as a parish priest at Louisbourg (Île Royale), and subsequently was appointed to Annapolis Royal. A good beginning under Lieutenant-Governor John Doucett turned to fleeing from Lieutenant-Governor Lawrence Armstrong to a Miꞌkmaq camp. When Governor Richard Philipps returned to Annapolis in 1729, Breslay was restored to his parish. He retired the next year to France.

Breslay contributed significantly to the New World during his various postings. However, he appears to have had frequent conflicts with a variety of colonial authorities.
