= Our Story (film) =

- Film poster
- Notre histoire
- Directed by: Bertrand Blier
- Written by: Bertrand Blier
- Produced by: Alain Sarde
- Starring: Alain Delon; Nathalie Baye
- Cinematography: Jean Penzer
- Edited by: Claudine Merlin
- Music by: Bohuslav Martinů; Laurent Rossi
- Distributed by: AMLF
- Release date: 23 May 1984
- Running time: 110 minutes
- Country: France
- Language: French
- Box office: $6.6 million

Our Story (original title: Notre histoire, also known as Separate Rooms) is a 1984 French absurdist drama film written and directed by Bertrand Blier and starring Alain Delon and Nathalie Baye. Both Delon and Blier won a César in 1985.

== Plot ==
Alone in a first-class compartment of a train from Geneva to Paris, a man is reading a motor magazine and drinking beer. A woman enters, challenges him to make love, and afterwards gets out at the next stop. Following her, he takes her to a hotel for a further bout and afterwards hires a car to drive her to her empty home.

He is Robert Avranches, a well-off garage owner with a wife and two little children, and she is Donatienne Pouget, a 33-year-old divorcee whose two children have been removed because of her lifestyle. When he says he'd like to stay with her, she says she is going dancing and returns late at night with a carload of friends from the night club.

There follows a purgatory for Robert, obsessed with a woman who has slept with all the neighbours and now picks up men on trains for fun. Men try to dissuade him and women try to console him, while all he wants is Donatienne, who eventually avoids his attentions by disappearing. He sets off in search of her but is retrieved by his brother and friends from Paris, who take him back to his home. His wife, delighted to have him back, looks identical to Donatienne.

== Cast ==
- Alain Delon as Robert Avranches
- Nathalie Baye as Donatienne Pouget / Marie-Thérèse Chatelard / Geneviève Avranches
- Michel Galabru as Emile (one of Donatienne's neighbours)
- Gérard Darmon as Duval
- Geneviève Fontanel as Madeleine, wife of Emile
- Jean-Pierre Darroussin as the traveller
- Jean-François Stévenin as Chatelard, husband of Marie-Thérèse
- Sabine Haudepin as Carmen
- Ginette Garcin as the florist
- Vincent Lindon as Brechet
- Bernard Farcy as Farid
- Norbert Letheule as Paraiso
- Jean-Louis Foulquier as Bob
- Philippe Laudenbach as Sam
- Paul Guers as Clark
- Notable appearances also include Jean Reno and Jean-Claude Dreyfus

== Production ==
The film was partially shot in the Aube department, including in Jeugny and Troyes, in March 1984. Filming also took place in the Haute-Savoie department during the winter of 1983–84, with scenes being shot at a auto body shop in Thyez, at the former nightclub Le Xénon in Bonneville, le Xénon, and in a school in Petit-Bornand.

== Awards and nominations ==
1985 César Awards (France)

- Won: Best Actor : Alain Delon
- Won: Best Original Screenplay : Bertrand Blier
  - Nominated: Best Production Design : Bernard Evein
  - Nominated: Best Editing : Claudine Merlin
