= Les Shadoks =

French animated television series

- Genre: Comedy; Sci-fi; Adventure
- Created by: Jacques Rouxel
- Directed by: René Borg
- Narrated by: Claude Piéplu
- Opening theme: Philippe Beetz
- Composer: Robert Cohen-Solal
- Country of origin: France
- Original language: French
- No. of seasons: 4
- No. of episodes: 208

Production
- Producers: Animation Art graphique Audiovisuel (aaa) (seasons 1-4); Office de Radiodiffusion Télévision Française (seasons 1-3); StudioCanal; Turner Broadcasting System Europe (season 4)
- Running time: 2/3 minutes (approx. per episode)

Original release
- Network: TF1 (Note: Known as ORTF Télévision until 1975) (season 1-3); Canal+ Cartoon Network France (season 4)
- Release: April 29, 1968 – 2000

Les Shadoks (French: [le ʃadɔk]) is an animated television series created by French cartoonist Jacques Rouxel (26 February 1931 – 25 April 2004) and broadcast in 1968–1974.

== Synopsis ==
The Shadoks were bird-like in appearance (in the tradition of cartoon birds they had beaks with teeth), were characterised by ruthlessness and stupidity and inhabited a two dimensional planet. This planet was of irregular shape, which was continuously changing - causing major earthquakes - hence their desire to find a new home world. There was a series of caves on the Shadok planet, known as the "Gulp" which was essentially a prison for undesirables.

One Shadok who stood apart from the others was the pirate - who was habitually drunk - and instead of the popular hobby of putting ships into bottles - he liked to put bottles into his ship.

Another set of creatures in the Shadok canon are the Gibis, who are the opposite to the Shadoks in that they are intelligent but vulnerable and also inhabit a two-dimensional planet. The Gibis were polite, always greeted each other formally, and kept their brains inside their bowler hats. The Gibi planet was a flat disc, finely balanced that if one Gibi went to one end of the planet; another would have to go to the far end to keep the planet balanced. Thus, the Gibis also wanted to find a new home world.

Ultimately, both saw the Earth as their ideal home - and both began to construct rockets to reach it.

The Shadoks were eventually able to leave their world thanks to the improved intelligence of one of their number; who happened to find a hat which one of the Gibis had lost.

Once both races reached Earth, much mayhem followed and they eventually realised it was not the ideal home they first thought.

== Production ==
Rouxel claims that the term Shadok obtains some derivation from Captain Haddock of Hergé's The Adventures of Tintin and the Gibis (who wear Bowler hats, which unlike their heads, contain their brains) are essentially GBs (Great Britons).

== Legacy ==
The Shadoks were a significant literary, cultural and philosophical phenomenon in France and the French occasionally use satirical comparisons with the Shadoks for policies and attitudes that they consider absurd. The Shadoks were noted for mottos such as:

- "Why do it the easy way when you can do it the hard way?"
- "When one tries continuously, one ends up succeeding. Thus, the more one fails, the greater the chance that it will work."
- "If there is no solution, it is because there is no problem."
- "To reduce the numbers of unhappy people, always beat up the same individuals."
- "Every advantage has its disadvantages and vice versa."
- "If there is one chance out of a 1000 to succeed, rush failing the 999 first tries."
- "And the shadoks pumped, pumped, pumped..."

== About the Shadoks ==
The Shadoks have four monosyllabic words in their language: "Ga", "Bu", "Zo", "Meu" (French spelling). But their brains only have four cells, so if they had to learn a new word (e.g. "Ni"), they would only remember the last four ones heard.

== Broadcast ==
In 1973, The Shadoks appeared on Thames Television, London's ITV company (later replaced by Carlton Television), in the early evening. Kenneth Robinson provided the narration in English.

On 18 September 2007, Les Shadoks was shown on Gulli's flagship retro block, "Télégrenadine".

== Google Doodle ==
On April 29, 2016, four animated Google Doodles were shown on the Google.fr homepage for Les Shadok's 48th anniversary.

== Filmography ==
- 1968: Les Shadoks (first season)
- 1969: French people write to the Shadoks.
- 1970: Les Shadoks (second season)
- 1974: Les Shadoks (third season)
- 1999: Les Shadoks et le Big Blank (produced by Canal +, aaa and Cartoon Network Europe)

== See also ==
- List of French animated television series
- ORTF
- Claude Piéplu
