= Courage fuyons =

1979 film by Yves Robert

- Theatrical release poster
- Directed by: Yves Robert
- Written by: Jean-Loup Dabadie; Yves Robert
- Dialogue by: Jean-Loup Dabadie
- Produced by: Alain Poiré; Yves Robert
- Starring: Jean Rochefort; Catherine Deneuve; Philippe Leroy-Beaulieu; Michel Beaune; Robert Webber; Dominique Lavanant; Michel Aumont
- Cinematography: Yves Lafaye
- Edited by: Pierre Gillette
- Music by: Vladimir Cosma
- Production companies: Les Productions de la Guéville; Gaumont International
- Distributed by: Gaumont Distribution
- Release date: 17 October 1979
- Running time: 100 minutes
- Country: France
- Language: French
- Box office: $8.8 million

Courage fuyons is a 1979 French romantic comedy film co-written and directed by Yves Robert. Starring Jean Rochefort and Catherine Deneuve, the film follows a mild-mannered pharmacist who impulsively abandons his family and begins an affair with a cabaret singer.

== Plot ==
Forty-year-old Martin Belhomme is a coward who leads a monotonous life with his nagging wife Mathilda and two children in Paris, where he works at the family drugstore. One evening, Martin accidentally becomes embroiled in the 1968 student riots, whereupon he helps the rioters destroy his own car as his family watches in disbelief. Not wanting to return home, he meets a student named Christophe who lets Martin stay in a student dormitory. The next morning, Martin meets Eva Silver, a beautiful cabaret singer headed for Amsterdam.

Martin borrows Christophe's motorcycle and offers to take Eva to Orly Airport. There, she asks Martin to tell a suspicious man to stop staring at her. After Martin pretends to confront the man, Eva kisses him before boarding her flight. Smitten with Eva, Martin impulsively rides to Amsterdam on Christophe's motorcycle. Martin and Eva reunite and sleep together in a local hotel. Instead of returning home, Martin stays in Amsterdam, where Eva has a three-month contract, and the two begin an affair.

Martin soon finds himself stalked by the man from Orly Airport, who is eventually revealed to be Eric de Chalamond, Eva's ex-lover who refuses to accept their breakup. When Eric shows up at their hotel room, Eva turns him away and reveals to Martin that Eric has been stalking and threatening her. Martin and Eva happily continue their affair, and he takes a day job as a dockworker while she performs concerts at night. Reading the newspaper one day, Martin finds that Mathilda has filed a missing person report for him.

Shortly after leaving Eva's venue one night, Martin is accosted by Eric, who begs Martin to let him have Eva. When Martin refuses, Eric threatens him with a straight razor and gives him one hour to leave town, otherwise he will kill both Martin and Eva. Terrified, Martin leaves a note in the hotel room claiming that his mother has suddenly fallen ill and rushes back to Paris, but the note is blown out of the window. The police bring Martin back to his frantic wife after finding him disoriented and suffering from partial amnesia.

A year later, Martin is overjoyed to learn that Eric has died in a helicopter crash. He promptly travels to Amsterdam to be with Eva, but she is upset that he left without telling her. Back in Paris, Mathilda divorces Martin and marries another man. Some time later, Eva arrives in Paris to surprise Martin. She explains that after Martin left Amsterdam, she ran into Eric, who claimed that it was Martin who had the straight razor and threatened to kill Eva and Eric, which impressed her.

Martin and Eva reconcile and eventually marry. Shortly after the wedding ceremony in Marne, Eva admits to Martin that she has been having an affair with Charley, a hot-tempered older man who is married with two children. She insists she has tried to leave Charley for years, but she is scared of him, so she asks Martin to talk to him. Instead, Martin becomes Eva and Charley's chauffeur. While trying to find the courage to confess the truth to Charley, Martin and Eva secretly see each other every time Charley goes away on business trips.

== Cast ==
- Jean Rochefort as Martin Belhomme / Adrien Belhomme
- Catherine Deneuve as Eva Silver
- Philippe Leroy-Beaulieu as Eric Sylvain de Chalamond
- Robert Webber as Charley
- Michel Beaune as Noël Blanc
- Eliane Borras as Sylvette Goldoni
- Christian Charmetant as Pierre Martin
- Nathalie Mazeas as Monica
- Janine Souchon as Madame Berger
- Christophe Bourseiller as Christophe
- Dominique Lavanant as Mathilda
- Michel Aumont as Franckie
- Gérard Darmon as the provocateur

== Accolades ==
| Award | Year | Category | Recipient(s) | Result |
|---|---|---|---|---|
| César Awards | 1980 | César Award for Best Actor | Jean Rochefort | Nominated |
| César Awards | 1980 | César Award for Best Supporting Actor | Michel Aumont | Nominated |
| César Awards | 1980 | César Award for Best Supporting Actress | Dominique Lavanant | Nominated |
