= Claude Piéplu =

French actor (1923–2006)

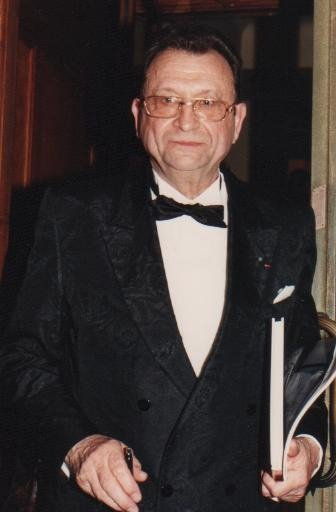
- Claude Piéplu in 1991
- Born: Claude Léon Auguste Piéplu; 9 May 1923; Paris, France
- Died: 24 May 2006 (aged 83); Paris, France
- Occupation: Actor
- Years active: 1944-2002
- Height: 176 cm (5 ft 9 1/2 in)
- Spouse: Fernande Robert
- Parent(s): Georges Piéplu (father); Léonie Burlet (mother)
- Awards: Ordre des Arts et des Lettres

Claude Léon Auguste Piéplu (9 May 1923 – 24 May 2006) was a French theatre, film and television actor. He was known for his hoarse and frayed voice.

A follower of aerial humour and tongue-in-cheek humour, he distinguished himself in theatre and cinema and, for the general public, is remembered as the narrator of the animated series Les Shadoks or the man with the keys to gold from the comedy TV series Palace.

In 1987, he was nominated for a Cesar Award for his role in Michel Deville's Le Paltoquet.

== Selected filmography ==
- D'homme à hommes (1948) (uncredited)
- Le Roi et l'oiseau (1952) as le maire du palais (voice)
- Adorables démons (1957)
- Suivez-moi jeune homme (1958) as contrôleur de train
- Du rififi chez les femmes (1959) as un client au restaurant
- It Happened All Night (1960) as cothes salesman
- La Française et l'amour (1960) as Marsac (segment "Adultère, L'")
- Le Caïd (1960) as Oxner
- La Belle Américaine (1961) as Me Fachepot, le notaire
- A Man Named Rocca (1961) as le directeur de la prison
- Le Théâtre de la jeunesse (1961, TV Series) as Maître Goupil / Michel et Tartolino / Benjamin Franklin / Thenardier / Panocratès / le libraire
- La Chambre ardente (1962) as l'inspecteur
- Le Diable et les dix commandements (1962) as un vigile (episode "Luxurieux point ne seras") (uncredited)
- How to Succeed in Love (1962) as le professeur de danse
- Two Are Guilty (1963) (uncredited)
- Le temps des copains (1963)
- Cherchez l'idole (1963) as himself
- Let's Rob the Bank (1964) as the priest
- Cherchez l'idole (1964) as Piéplu
- Une souris chez les hommes (1964) as un inspecteur
- Le Gendarme de St. Tropez (1964) as Boisselier
- Les Copains (1965) as le colonel / army officer
- Les Pieds dans le plâtre (1965) as le baron
- Your Money or Your Life (1966) as un surveillant de l'agence de Paris
- Si j'étais un espion (1967) as Monteil
- La Guerre de Troie n'aura pas lieu (1967, TV Movie)
- Diaboliquement vôtre (1967) as le décorateur
- L'Homme à la Buick (1968) as le notaire
- L'Écume des jours (1968) as le médecin
- Les Shadoks (1968, TV Series) as narrator
- La Prisonnière (1968) as le père de Josée
- The Devil by the Tail (1969) as Monsieur Patin (Le client assidu)
- Clérambard (1969) as Maître Galuchon
- Que ferait donc Faber?! (1969, TV Mini-Series) as Gaston Faber / Georges Brevin
- Hibernatus (1969) as le secrétaire général du ministère de l'intérieur
- Agence Intérim (1969, Episode: Quiproquo)
- Le Pistonné (1970) as le commandant
- Les Shadoks (1970, TV Series) as narrator (voice)
- Le Drapeau noir flotte sur la marmite (1971) as Alexandre Volabruque
- La Coqueluche (1971) as le commandant
- Au théâtre ce soir (1970-1971, TV Series) as Octave / Ford
- The Discreet Charm of the Bourgeoisie (1972) as colonel
- La Fin et les moyens (1972, TV Movie) as Etienne Varzy
- Sex-shop (1972) as l'officier
- Jean Vilar, une belle vie (1972) as himself
- Témoignages (1973, Episode: "L'homme assis") as l'homme assis
- Les Noces rouges (1973) as Paul Delamare
- Défense de savoir (1973) as Descarne (as Claude Pieplu)
- Les Aventures de Rabbi Jacob (1973) as le commissaire divisionnaire Andreani
- Prêtres interdits (1973) as l'abbé Grégoire Ancely
- Shadoks — Troisième série, Les (1973, TV Series) as narrator (voice)
- Par le sang des autres (1974) as le préfet
- Les Valseuses (1974) as récitant de la bande-annonce (voice, uncredited)
- La Gueule de l'emploi (1974) as le militaire
- Gross Paris (1974) as Sam
- Un nuage entre les dents (1974) as le directeur du journal
- Le Fantôme de la liberté (1974) as commissioner
- La moutarde me monte au nez (1974) as docteur Hubert Durois
- Soirée Courteline (1974, TV Movie) as Des Rillettes (segment "Boulingrin, Les")
- Section spéciale (1975) as Michel Benon, le président de la Section spéciale
- C'est dur pour tout le monde (1975) as Marcel
- Les Galettes de Pont-Aven (1975) as le pèlerin / le barde Breton
- Calmos (1976) as l'ancien combattant
- La Meilleure façon de marcher (1976) as camp director
- L'Ordinateur des pompes funèbres (1976) as Piette Tournier
- Le Locataire (1976) as neighbor (as Claude Pieplu)
- L 'Apprenti salaud (1977) as Etienne Forelon, le notaire de Briançon
- Dites-lui que je l'aime (1977) as Chouin
- Le Mille-pattes fait des claquettes (1977) as capitaine Leipzig
- Les Folies Offenbach (1977, TV Mini-Series) as Villemessant
- Et vive la liberté! (1978) as Lardenois
- Chaussette surprise (1978) as le médecin
- Vas-y maman (1978) as l'éditeur
- Le Pion (1978) as le censeur
- Le sucre (1978) as président Berot
- Cinéma 16 (1978-1980, TV Series) as Claude / Louis Dupon
- Ils sont grands, ces petits (1979) as Arthur Palanque
- Chouette, chat, chien... show (1980, TV Movie) as la chouette hibou
- Histoire contemporaine (1981, TV Mini-Series) as M. Bergeret
- Mon meilleur Noël (1981, Episode: "L'oiseau bleu") as le grand-père
- Emmenez-moi au théâtre (1982, TV Series) as Demokos
- Merci Bernard (1982-1984, TV Series)
- Allô Béatrice (1984, Episode: "Charmant week-end") as De Fénix
- La Galette du roi (1986) as Lionel Costerman
- Les Matics (1986, TV Series) as Récitant / narrator (voice)
- Le Paltoquet (1986) as the professor
- Beau temps mais orageux en fin de journée (1986) as Jacques
- Un coupable (1988, TV Movie) as Monsieur Fiore
- Palace (1988, TV Series) as Hugues-Jean Landreau, l'homme aux clefs d'or
- Suivez cet avion (1989) as Ascar
- Après après-demain (1990) as Alex
- Années de plumes, années de plomb (1991, TV Movie) as Grousset
- D 14 (1993, Short) as le supérieur hiérarchique
- Casque bleu (1994) as Pierre
- Le Silence du coeur (1994, TV Movie) as Henri Weber
- Maigret (1994, TV Series) as Charles Dandurand
- Les Faussaires (1994) as Ryckmans
- Voyage de Pénélope, Le (1996, TV Movie) as Gaspard
- Fallait pas! (1996) as Bernard's Father
- Un amour impossible (1996, TV Mini-Series) as M. Louvet, l'armateur
- Entre terre et mer (1997) (TV miniseries)
- Chapeau bas (1998, Short) as Monsieur Julien
- Astérix et Obélix contre César (1999) as Panoramix
- Shadoks et le Big Blank, Les (2000, TV Series) as narrator (final appearance)

=== Video games ===
- The Bizarre Adventures of Woodruff and the Schnibble (1995) as narrator/Professor Azimuth (voice)
