= César Award for Best Poster =

French film award

The César Award for Best Poster is a former category of the César Awards, France's national film award. The nominations were selected by members of the Académie des Arts et Techniques du Cinema.

The award was first made in 1986, but was discontinued after only five years due to the difficulty the organisers found in crediting a single individual or team with the design of the poster, which was often a collaborative work by several teams. Moreover, many film posters were not French, being imported, particularly from America.

The five winners of the Best Poster award were:

1986: Harem, poster design by Michel Landi
1987: 37°2 le matin (released in English as Betty Blue), by Christian Blondel
1988: Tandem, by Stéphane Bielikoff
1989: La Petite Voleuse (released in English as The Little Thief), by Annie Miller, Luc Roux and Stéphane Bielikoff
1990: Cinema Paradiso, by Jouineau Bourduge
