= Tandem (film) =

- Poster by Stéphane Bielikoff, which won the César Award for Best Poster
- Directed by: Patrice Leconte
- Screenplay by: Patrice Leconte; Patrick Dewolf
- Produced by: Philippe Carcassonne; René Cleitman
- Starring: Gérard Jugnot; Jean Rochefort
- Cinematography: Denis Lenoir
- Edited by: Joëlle Hache
- Music by: François Bernheim; Richard Cocciante; Il mio rifugio
- Production companies: Cinéa; Hachette Première; Films A2
- Distributed by: AMLF
- Release date: 17 June 1987
- Running time: 86 minutes
- Country: France
- Language: French
- Box office: $4.5 million

Tandem [tɑ̃.dɛm] is a 1987 French road movie comedy drama directed by Patrice Leconte.

== Plot ==
The film concerns a French radio quiz show host and his long suffering assistant as they travel around the country for the programme.

== Cast ==
- Gérard Jugnot : Rivetot
- Jean Rochefort : Michel Mortez
- Sylvie Granotier : Bookseller
- Julie Jézéquel : The waitress
- Jean-Claude Dreyfus : Adviser
- Marie Pillet : Proprietress of 'Hôtel du Commerce'
- Albert Delpy : Driver saw 'Red Dog'
