= François de Lamothe =

French art director

- Born: 9 May 1928; Meaux, France
- Died: 3 November 2011 (aged 83); Paris, France
- Occupation: Art director
- Years active: 1954–2009 (film)

François de Lamothe (1928–2011) was a French art director. He designed the film sets on a number of productions between the 1950s and the 2000s, including Jean-Pierre Melville's Le Samouraï. He was nominated four times for the César Award for Best Production Design.

== Selected filmography ==
- Pierrot la tendresse (1960)
- Cartouche (1962)
- How to Succeed in Love (1962)
- Hotel Paradiso (1966)
- My Uncle Benjamin (1969)
- Sweet Deception (1972)
- Piaf (1974)
- The Pink Telephone (1975)
- One, Two, Two : 122, rue de Provence (1978)
- Les Misérables (1982)
- He Died with His Eyes Open (1985)

== Bibliography ==
- Powrie, Phil. The Cinema of France. Wallflower Press, 2006.
- Sherry, Norman. The Life of Graham Greene: 1955-1991. Penguin Books, 2005.
