= Michel Barthélemy =

French missionary (1638–1706)

- Born: 1638; Paris, France
- Died: 11 April 1706 (aged 67–68); Montreal, Canada
- Known for: missionary

Michel Barthélemy (1638 – 11 April 1706) was born in France, became a Sulpician priest and came to New France in 1665. He was sent as a missionary to the Algonquins with François Dollier de Casson to learn their language and study their way of life.

By 1672, Barthélemy had joined François de Salignac de la Mothe-Fénelon and Claude Trouvé in a mission to the Iroquois on the north shore of Lake Ontario. Because of difficulties, this mission was abandoned after the death of François de Salignac.

Michel went to the Iroquois mission of La Montagne for a short time and replaced Father Bailly as school-master. His next move was to Ville-Marie where he was able to continue his mission to the Algonquins. He promoted the mission in many ways and, thanks to his support and interest, the mission of Île aux Tourtres was founded in 1703 by M. de Breslay, parish priest of the mission St-Louis, in Baie d'Urfé.

M. de Breslay succeeded to curé Francois Lascaris d'Urfé and first moved the mission to Isle aux tourtes, for the Indians Nipissings. Then after an accident where he broke his leg, he invoke Ste-Anne if he were to survive, which he did. So he founded the parish of Ste-Anne-du-bout-de-l'Isle, at the western end of Montreal island.
