= Harem (film) =

- Directed by: Arthur Joffe
- Written by: Arthur Joffé; Tom Rayfiel
- Produced by: Alain Sarde
- Starring: Nastassja Kinski; Ben Kingsley; Zohra Sehgal; Dennis Goldson; Michel Robin
- Cinematography: Pasqualino De Santis
- Edited by: Dominique B. Martin; Ruggero Mastroianni
- Music by: Philippe Sarde
- Distributed by: UGC; Europe 1
- Release date: 20 November 1985 (France)
- Country: France
- Language: English

Harem is a 1985 French romantic drama directed by Arthur Joffé. It was filmed in Morocco, particularly El Jadida.

== Plot ==
Diane Andrews is a haughty Wall Street floor trader without any romantic interests. One day, Sheikh Selim, the ruler of an oil-rich Gulf country, who has been tracking Diane has her drugged, kidnapped, and brought to his harem overseen by eunuch Massoud. Despite Diane's initial protests, as the two come to appreciate each other, they fall in love. Meanwhile, a series of events makes Selim realise that he can no longer rule his country and harem the way he and his ancestors used to do. Eventually, he takes the radical decision to evacuate his isolated castle.

== Cast ==
- Nastassja Kinski – Diane
- Ben Kingsley – Selim
- Dennis Goldson – Massoud
- Michel Robin – Monsieur Raoul
- Norman Chancer- American Engineer
- Zohra Sehgal – Affaf
- Juliette Simpson – Zelide
- Karen Bowen – Mrs. Green
- Teco Celio – Italian Worker
- Jack Davidson – Boat Man
- Bill Dunn – American Worker
- Charmagne Eckert – Woman in Church
- Rosanne Katon – Judy
- Maria Kaushan – Gypsy
- Guy Matchoro – French Worker

== Reception ==
Harem was nominated for five César Awards in 1986 and won two; César Award for Best Costume Design and César Award for Best Poster.
