= Too Beautiful for You =

1989 film by Bertrand Blier

- Theatrical release poster
- French: Trop belle pour toi
- Directed by: Bertrand Blier
- Written by: Bertrand Blier
- Starring: Josiane Balasko; Carole Bouquet; Gérard Depardieu
- Cinematography: Philippe Rousselot
- Edited by: Claudine Merlin
- Production companies: Ciné Valse; D.D. Productions; Orly Films; SEDIF; TF1 Films Production
- Distributed by: AMLF
- Release date: 12 May 1989 (France)
- Running time: 91 minutes
- Country: France
- Language: French
- Box office: $15 million

Too Beautiful for You (French: Trop belle pour toi) is a 1989 French romantic comedy-drama film written and directed by Bertrand Blier. It tells the story of Bernard (Gérard Depardieu), a well-established BMW car dealer in the South of France, who is cheating on his beautiful wife (Carole Bouquet) with his ordinary-looking secretary (Josiane Balasko).

== Synopsis ==
Bernard Barthélémy, owner of a BMW car dealership, is married to an exceptionally beautiful woman, Florence, but he falls in love with a plain-looking but warm-hearted woman, Colette, who has been hired as a temp secretary at his dealership. This relationship will change his life. The film features surreal, fantasy sequences and a non-linear timeline.

== Cast ==
- Josiane Balasko as Colette Chevassu
- Gérard Depardieu as Bernard Barthélémy
- Carole Bouquet as Florence Barthélémy
- François Cluzet as Pascal Chevassu
- Roland Blanche as Marcello
- Myriam Boyer as Geneviève
- Denise Chalem as Lorène
- Didier Bénureau as Léonce
- Philippe Loffredo as Tanguy
- Stéphane Auberghen as Paula
- Jean-Louis Cordina as Gaby
- Jean-Paul Farré as the pianist
- Richard Martin as the man on the tram
- Philippe Faure as Colette's husband
- Juana Marques as the daughter
- Flavien Lebarbé as the son
- Sylvie Orcier as Marie-Catherine (uncredited)

== Reception ==
The film had 2,031,131 admissions in France.

On review aggregator website Rotten Tomatoes, the film holds an approval rating of 60% based on 5 reviews, with an average rating of 6.9/10.

== Accolades ==
Award	Year	Category	Recipient	Result
Cannes Film Festival	1989	Grand Prix	Bertrand Blier	Won (Note: Tied with Cinema Paradiso)
César Awards	1990	Best Film		Won
César Awards	1990	Best Actor	Gérard Depardieu	Nominated
César Awards	1990	Best Actress	Carole Bouquet	Won
César Awards	1990	Best Supporting Actor	Roland Blanche	Nominated
César Awards	1990	Best Director	Bertrand Blier	Won
César Awards	1990	Best Original Screenplay or Adaptation	Bertrand Blier	Won
César Awards	1990	Best Cinematography	Philippe Rousselot	Nominated
César Awards	1990	Best Editing	Claudine Merlin	Won
César Awards	1990	Best Production Design	Théobald Meurisse	Nominated
