= Ève Ruggieri =

French actress, producer, and author

Ève Ruggieri (born 13 March 1939) is a French radio and television presenter, actress, producer and author.

== Publications ==
- L'honneur retrouvé du marquis de Montespan, Perrin, 1993 ISBN 2262006261
- Mozart, l'itinéraire sentimental, J'ai Lu, 1999 ISBN 2277233226
- Quelques femmes remarquables, Pocket, 1998 ISBN 2266009362
- Les grandes rencontres amoureuses, J'ai Lu, 2001 ISBN 2277222267
- Le rêve de Zamor, Plon, 2003 ISBN 2259186475
- Pavarotti, Michel Lafon, 2007 ISBN 2749907829
- Mozart, l'itinéraire libertin, Michel Lafon, 2007 ISBN 2749904080
- La Callas, Michel Lafon, 2007 ISBN 2749907136
- Chopin, l'impossible amour, Michel Lafon, 2010 ISBN 2749911664
- Liszt, l'abbé libertin, Michel Lafon, 2011 ISBN 2749914892
- Dictionnaire amoureux de Mozart, Plon, 2017 ISBN 2259210414
