= Patrick Dewolf =

French film director and screenwriter (1950–2026)

- Born: 3 June 1950; Paris, France
- Died: March 2026 (aged 75)
- Occupations: Film director, screenwriter

Patrick Dewolf (3 June 1950 – March 2026) was a French film director and screenwriter. He was nominated for a César Award in the category Best Original or Adapted Screenplay for the film Tandem. His nomination was shared with Patrice Leconte.

Dewolf died in March 2026, at the age of 75.

== Selected filmography ==
- Tandem (1987; co-nominated with Patrice Leconte)
