= My Best Friend's Girl (1983 film) =

1983 film

- Film poster
- La Femme de mon pote
- Directed by: Bertrand Blier
- Written by: Bertrand Blier; Gérard Brach
- Produced by: Claude Berri; Pierre Grunstein
- Starring: Isabelle Huppert
- Cinematography: Jean Penzer
- Edited by: Claudine Merlin
- Music by: JJ Cale
- Distributed by: AMLF
- Release date: 31 August 1983
- Running time: 99 minutes
- Country: France
- Language: French

My Best Friend's Girl (French: La Femme de mon pote) is a 1983 French comedy film directed by Bertrand Blier that stars Isabelle Huppert, Thierry Lhermitte, and Coluche.

== Plot ==
In the ski resort of Courchevel, Pascal is the tall, handsome and wealthy owner of a sports goods shop with no shortage of girl friends and his best friend is the DJ Micky, short, plump and always on his own. Early one morning, Pascal drags Micky up to his isolated chalet to show him the most fantastic girl he has ever had in his bed, the glamorous Viviane, and as he has to open his shop he asks Micky to look after her. Since Micky has also fallen totally for her charm, he finds it difficult to resist when she seduces him as well. In the days that follow, the two men struggle to keep their friendship intact and to keep the affection of Viviane. Eventually Micky cracks under the strain and Pascal moves him into the chalet where Viviane can look after him. With spring approaching, Viviane starts thinking of the coast and drives off with a man she has met. As the two friends are on the terrace commiserating over her departure, she creeps back alone and overhears how much they both love her and miss her.

== Cast ==
- Coluche as Micky
- Isabelle Huppert as Viviane
- Thierry Lhermitte as Pascal
- François Perrot as The doctor
- Daniel Colas as The flirt
- Frederique Michot
- Farid Chopel as The hoodlum
