= If I Were a Spy =

- Film poster
- Si j'étais un espion
- Directed by: Bertrand Blier
- Written by: Philippe Adrien; Bertrand Blier; Jacques Cousseau; Jean-Pierre Simonot; Antoine Tudal
- Produced by: Pierre Cabaud; Lucien Masson
- Starring: Bernard Blier; Bruno Cremer; Suzanne Flon
- Cinematography: Jean-Louis Picavet
- Edited by: Kenout Peltier
- Music by: Serge Gainsbourg; Michel Colombier
- Production companies: Pathé; UGC Images; Sirius
- Distributed by: Compagnie Française de Distribution Cinématographique
- Release date: 30 August 1967
- Running time: 95 minutes
- Country: France
- Language: French
- Box office: 77,290 admissions (France)

If I Were a Spy (French: Si j'étais un espion) is a 1967 French thriller film directed by Bertrand Blier, starring Bernard Blier and Bruno Cremer. It tells the story of a medical doctor who gets into trouble when one of his patients turns out to be hunted by the mafia. Filming took place from 15 November to 18 December 1966. The film was released in France in August 1967.

== Cast ==
- Bernard Blier as Doctor Lefèvre
- Bruno Cremer as Matras
- Suzanne Flon as Geneviève Laurent
- Claude Piéplu as Monteil
- Patricia Scott as Sylvie
- Pierre Le Rumeur as Kruger
- Francis Lax as Rodard
- Jacques Sempey as a man
- Jean-François Rémi as Jean-François Rémy
