= Grosse =

Große or Grosse is a German surname. Notable people with the surname include:

- Aristid von Grosse (1905–1985), German nuclear chemist
- Ben Grosse, American record producer and mixer
- Carl Grosse (1768–1847), German author, translator, philosopher, and mineralogist
- Catrin G. Grosse (born 1964), German painter, graphic designer and sculptor
- Charles le Grosse (c. 1596–1650), English politician
- Christina Große (born 1970), German actress
- Demetrius Grosse (born 1981), American actor and producer
- Doris Große (born 1884), German artists' model for Ernst Ludwig Kirchner
- Edward Grosse (1845–1897), German-American journalist, lawyer, and politician
- Fritz Große (1904–1957), German politician and diplomat
- George Grosse (1930–2016), American politician from Florida
- Hans-Werner Grosse (1922–2021), German bomber pilot
- Heinz-Josef Große (1947–1982), East German construction worker
- Johannes Große (born 1997), German field hockey player
- Julius Grosse (1828–1902), German poet
- Katharina Grosse (born 1961), German visual artist
- Maurice Grosse (1919–2006), British paranormal investigator
- Nina Grosse (born 1958), German film director and screenwriter
- Steffen Grosse (born 1967), German politician
- Theodor Grosse (1829–1891), German historical painter
- Twila Grosse, Canadian politician
- Ulrich Grosse (born 1953), German public transport consultant
