= Jean Penzer =

French cinematographer (1927–2021)

- Born: 1 October 1927; Livry-Gargan, France
- Died: May 20, 2021 (aged 93); Châtenay-Malabry, France
- Occupation: Cinematographer
- Years active: 1951 - 1992

Jean Penzer (October 1, 1927 – May 20, 2021) was a French cinematographer. He contributed to more than sixty films from 1951 to 1992.

Film
Year	Title	Notes
1992	The Return of Casanova	
1991	Amelia Lópes O'Neill	
1986	Tenue de soirée	
1985	He Died with His Eyes Open	
1985	Hell Train	
1984	Le Bon Plaisir	
1984	Notre histoire	
1983	My Best Friend's Girl	
1982	Une chambre en ville	
1982	The Passerby	
1981	Malevil	
1979	Buffet froid	
1979	Lady Oscar	
1978	Get Out Your Handkerchiefs	
1976	Le Corps de mon ennemi	
1976	The Hunter Will Get You	
1975	Incorrigible	
1975	Peur sur la ville	
1975	Aloïse	
1973	Hail the Artist	
1971	Without Apparent Motive	
1969	Détruire, dit-elle	
1967	The Two of Us	
1966	La Voleuse	
1962	The Seven Deadly Sins	
1961	Five Day Lover	
1960	Les Jeux de l'amour	

== Awards ==
- 1986 César Award for best Cinematography for He Died with His Eyes Open
