= Yves Charnay =

French Light Artist and painter

- Born: January 25, 1942; Saint-Chamond, Loire, France
- Known for: Light art, Installation, Painting

Yves Charnay (born January 25, 1942, in Saint-Chamond, Loire) is a French Light Artist and painter.

== About ==
The artist deals in recent times mainly with light installations, perspective art works and paintings. Some of his works are displayed in China and Germany, such as "Les couleur de l'esprit", in the state parliament of Saxony-Anhalt or the spatial anamorphosis of Schloss Brake (Lemgo), which was created in cooperation with Claude Prévost. The latest international work is "Gestes réfléchis" in JiangYin, China. Besides being a light and object artist, he appears also as a painter, curator of international exhibitions, film writer, and artistic consultant for cinema and television.

== Works ==
Lumière mise en œuvre - 2010, Albi, France
Gestes réfléchis - 2009, Jiang Yin, China
Farbcharta für Tanggu - 2008, Tanggu, China
Conversation - 2006, Lyon, France
Le temps déployé - 2006, Weserrenaissance-Museum, Lemgo, Germany
Les calligraphies du vent - 2005, Shanghai, China
Jardin à la française - 2005, Hangzhou, China
Innocence - 2005, Brive, France
Poème en vers nanométriques - 2004, Magdeburg, Germany
Les couleurs de l'esprit - 2003, parlement of Saxony-Anhalt, Magdeburg, Germany
Lumières -2002, Enghien-les-bains, France
L'azur en pré fleurit - 2002, Louroux, France
Notre Dame des couleurs - 2002, Soulatgé, Frankreich
Des couleurs tombées du ciel - 2000, Apt en Provence, France
