= Jacques Rouxel (animator) =

- Born: February 26, 1931; Cherbourg, France
- Died: April 25, 2004 (aged 73)
- Occupation: Animator

Jacques Rouxel (26 February 1931 – 25 April 2004), born in Cherbourg, France, was a film animator. Rouxel is perhaps best known for his initially controversial animated French TV series Les Shadoks, which first appeared in 1968.

Rouxel graduated from the Lycée Français de New York in 1946 and obtained a business degree from the HEC Paris.

He worked on the prototype of a special machine, the "Animographe", especially designed to accelerate the production of animated TV series.
