= Jacques Rouxel (production designer) =

French production designer

- Occupation: Production designer
- Years active: 1981–present

Jacques Rouxel is a French production designer. He was nominated for an Academy Award in the category Best Art Direction for the film Cyrano de Bergerac.

== Selected filmography ==
- Cyrano de Bergerac (1990)
