= Calmos =

1976 film by Bertrand Blier

- Directed by: Bertrand Blier
- Written by: Bertrand Blier; Philippe Dumarçay
- Produced by: Christian Fechner
- Starring: Jean-Pierre Marielle; Jean Rochefort; Bernard Blier; Brigitte Fossey
- Cinematography: Claude Renoir
- Edited by: Claudine Merlin
- Music by: Georges Delerue
- Distributed by: AMLF
- Release date: 11 February 1976
- Running time: 107 minutes
- Country: France
- Language: French

Calmos is a 1976 French film directed by Bertrand Blier. A comedy that explores the battle of the sexes, often explicitly, it satirises both the rise of feminism in France and traditional attitudes of Frenchmen.

== Synopsis ==
Paul, a married gynecologist in Paris, is weary of women's bodies and needs. Leaving a patient in the stirrups, he heads for the freedom of the street. There he meets Albert, who has that morning left his wife. Each recognises a kindred spirit, and the two travel to a remote village, where they rent a house and lead a relaxed bachelor existence. Their enthusiasm for good food and wine earns them the friendship of the village priest. However, the idyll ends when their wives track them down and coerce the priest, after negotiation, into recalling them to their marital duties.

After weeks of freedom, a weekend at home with the wife is more than either can bear. They run away to open country, where they are joined by other men who cannot stand the demands of women and are fed by sympathetic farmers. This pastoral fraternity is scattered by a tank crewed by women, and the fleeing Paul and Albert are captured by a squad of female infantry. Their captain says the two will have to pleasure them all, starting with her, but after negotiation lets them make a run for it. Once caught again, they are taken to an institute in Paris and operated on. Fixed to their beds and with enormous erections, women are let in two at a time for strictly two minutes of copulation.

Years later, aged and shrunken to miniature size, they are living on a mountain top and have made themselves tiny hang gliders. Caught in a storm, their machines are wafted over the ocean and drop them in a strange cleft by a tropical beach. Exploring it, they fall into a soft-walled cavern that throbs. Viewers realise the two are inside the body of a woman....

== Cast ==
- Jean-Pierre Marielle as Paul Dufour, a gynaecologist
- Jean Rochefort as Albert
- Bernard Blier as Émile
- Brigitte Fossey as Suzanne Dufour
- Valérie Mairesse as Claudine
- Micheline Kahn as Geneviève
- Sylvie Joly as The Doctor
- Claude Piéplu as The Old Soldier
- Dora Doll as The Amazon Chief
- Dominique Lavanant as The short-sighted woman
- Marthe Villalonga & Françoise Bertin as Employees of the lab
- Liliane Rovère as A Soldier

== Reception ==
For The New Yorker, Pauline Kael writes that the first half of the film is a "hilariously scandalous dirty-boy romp" but is in essence "an overscaled back-to-the-womb satiric fantasy" and "more about sex than women."
