= Alain Sarde =

French film producer and actor (born 1952)

- Born: 28 March 1952 (age 74); Boulogne-Billancourt, Hauts-de-Seine, France
- Years active: 1974–present

Alain Sarde (born 28 March 1952) is a French film producer.

== Early life ==
Alain Sarde was born in Boulogne-Billancourt, France.

== Career ==
David Lynch's Mulholland Drive, a film Sarde co-produced, received the Online Film Critics Society Award for Best Picture. The Pianist was nominated for the Academy Award for Best Picture and won the BAFTA Award for Best Film. Another film of his – Intimate Strangers – is being remade by Paramount Pictures.

In May 2024, Sarde was accused by nine women including actresses Annelise Hesme and Laurence Côte of rape and sexual assault between 1985 and 2003 after French magazine Elle investigated.

== Filmography ==
- Don't Touch The White Woman! (1974)
- Barocco (1976)
- First Name: Carmen (1983)
- My Best Friend's Girl (1983)
- Mixed Blood (1984)
- The Sky Above Paris (1991)
- Bitter Moon (1992)
- L.627 (1992)
- Wild Reeds (1994)
- The Bait (L'Appât) (1995)
- Nelly and Mr. Arnaud (1995)
- Ponette (1996)
- La Belle Verte (1996)
- Dry Cleaning (1997)
- An Air So Pure (1997)
- Place Vendôme (1998)
- Alice and Martin (1998)
- Children of the Century (1999)
- Franck Spadone (1999)
- Le coeur à l'ouvrage (2000)
- Water Drops on Burning Rocks (2000)
- To Matthieu (2000)
- Les Acteurs (2000)
- Belphégor - Le fantôme du Louvre (2001)
- Chaos (2001)
- Mulholland Drive (2001)
- That Love (2001)
- Speak to Me of Love (2002)
- The Pianist (2002)
- Jet Lag (2002)
- 18 Years Later (2003)
- Sole Sisters (2003)
- Life Is a Miracle (2004)
- Notre musique (2004)
- Intimate Strangers (2004)
- Oliver Twist (2005)
