= Pierre Guffroy =

French production designer

- Born: 22 April 1926; Paris, France
- Died: 27 September 2010 (aged 84); Burgundy, France
- Occupations: Production designer, art director
- Years active: 1957–1998

Pierre Guffroy (22 April 1926 – 27 September 2010) was a French production designer and art director. He won an Oscar for Tess in 1979 and had been previously nominated for one in another category Best Art Direction for Is Paris Burning? in 1966.

== Selected filmography ==
Guffroy won an Academy Award for Best Art Direction and was nominated for another:

Won

- Tess (1979)

Nominated

- Is Paris Burning? (1966)
