= César Awards =

Annual French film awards

- Current: 51st César Awards
- The César Award logo
- Awarded for: Achievements in French cinema
- Country: France
- Presented by: Académie des Arts et Techniques du Cinéma
- First award: April 3, 1976; 50 years ago
- Website: academie-cinema.org

The César Award (Note: As indicated on the official website, the name César is considered a proper noun. In French, proper nouns are invariable and never take a plural 's'.) (French: [sezaʁ]) is the national film award of France. It is delivered in the Nuit des César ceremony and was first awarded in 1976. The nominations are selected by the members of twelve categories of filmmaking professionals and supported by the French Ministry of Culture. The nationally televised award ceremony is held in Paris each year in February. The exact location has changed over the years (in the Théâtre du Châtelet from 2002 to 2016). It is an initiative of the Académie des Arts et Techniques du Cinéma, which was founded in 1975.

The César Award is considered the highest film honor in France, the French film industry's equivalent to the Molière Award for theatre, and the Victoires de la Musique for music. In cinema, it is the French equivalent to the Academy Awards. The award was created by Georges Cravenne, who was also the creator of the Molière Award for theatre. The name of the award comes from the sculptor César Baldaccini (1921–1998) who designed it.

The 51st César Awards ceremony took place on 26 February 2026. The Ties That Bind Us, directed by Carine Tardieu, won the award for Best Film.

== History ==
In 1974, Georges Cravenne founded the Academy of Arts and Techniques of Cinema that was, from the outset, intended to reward the achievements and the most remarkable film artwork, to have a French equivalent to the American Oscars. The first César Awards – also known as the "Night of Caesar" – were held on 3 April 1976 under the chairmanship of Jean Gabin who watched the ceremony from the front row seated in a wheelchair a few months before his death. The name of the award comes from the sculptor César, designer of the trophy awarded to the winners in each category. It is also an homage to Raimu, the great French actor and performer in the Marseille trilogy of Marcel Pagnol, in which Raimu played the character of César.

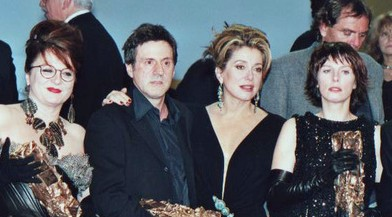
Josiane Balasko, Daniel Auteuil, Catherine Deneuve, and Karin Viard at the 2000 César Award Ceremony

The César Awards replaced the Étoile de cristal, which was awarded from 1955 to 1975. Other prizes had been awarded to French cinema in the past. From 1934 to 1986, the Grand prix du cinéma français, established by film pioneer Louis Lumière, was given to one film a year. In the 1950s, the Victoire du cinéma français was awarded each June. Lacking popular enthusiasm compared to the Étoile de cristal, this award was discontinued after 1964.

At the inaugural César Awards, 13 awards were distributed. Today, there are 22 (in nine subcategories). Categories added in recent years include Most Promising Actor/Actress (Meilleur espoir), Best Documentary (Meilleur documentaire) and Best Animated Film (Meilleur film d'animation), while awards honoring the best film poster and best producer have been dropped, as they are now given at a sister ceremony, the Prix Daniel Toscan du Plantier. In September 2021, the governing association of the César Awards voted to create two new awards that were introduced in the 47th ceremony: Best Visual Effects and Best Documentary Short Film.

Beginning with the 43rd César ceremony in 2018, a new special award, the César du public, is given to the French film with the most box office receipts during the previous year and the beginning of the current year. This award responds to the need to reward French comedy films, which remain the most popular genre in France.

During the 45th ceremony in 2020, Adèle Haenel, a French actress playing the main character in Portrait of a Lady on Fire, left the room when Roman Polanski's award for best director was announced in protest against the fact that notable sexual abusers in the film industry can receive awards when their victims are reduced to silence. Polanski was convicted of unlawful sexual intercourse with a 13-year-old in California in 1978, and has additionally been accused of other incidents of rape.

== The statue ==
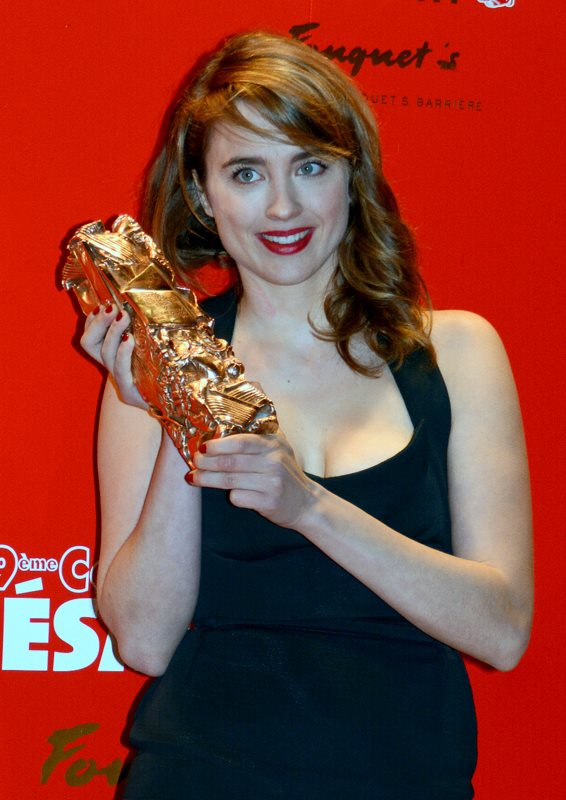
Adèle Haenel receiving a César award in 2014

The César statues are compressed sculptures of metal objects, designed in 1975 by the sculptor César Baldaccini, a friend of Georges Cravenne who gave them their name as a wink to the Oscars, the sound of the name being close to the film César by Pagnol. These forged pieces are made from polished natural bronze, unlike the Oscars which are plated in gold. The latter directly inspired the first AATC trophy in 1976, which was a reel of film encircling a silhouette. In 1977, before a mixed reception of actors, Baldaccini unveiled the current 8 by 8 cm compression, weighing 3.6 kg and cast in the Bocquel foundry in Normandy. The cost of a César has not been officially revealed, but is estimated at around 1,500 euros.

== Voting process ==
Voting for César Awards is conducted through two ballots by mail: the first to establish nominations per category (three to five, depending on the discipline), and the second to decide the winner.

Voters are professionals in the field, numbering about 4,000, divided into 12 colleges (actors, directors, writers, technicians, producers, distributors and international vendors, operators, agents artistic, technical industries, casting directors, press officers and members associates). The criteria for voting are: demonstrate a relatively consistent career in film and get a double sponsorship in the Académie des arts et techniques du cinéma. Nominees or winners of the previous editions are exempt from these formalities.

To aid voters, the Académie identifies each year films released in France and provides a guide to the works and eligible professionals. A DVD set of French or primarily French productions produced during the year is sent in December with the catalog of films to the electors. After the nominations are revealed, at the end of January, special screenings of the nominated films are shown at the Le Balzac cinema in Paris, near the Champs-Élysées. Each year, a special lunch (Déjeuner des nommés aux César du cinéma) for nominees is held at the famous Fouquet's restaurant on the Champs-Élysées, a few weeks before the ceremony.

== Categories ==
=== Merit awards ===
- Best Film
- Best Director
- Best Actor
- Best Actress
- Best Supporting Actor
- Best Supporting Actress
- Best Male Revelation
- Best Female Revelation
- Best Adaptation
- Best Original Screenplay
- Best First Film
- Best Foreign Film
- Best Animated Film
- Best Documentary Film
- Best Animated Short Film
- Best Documentary Short Film
- Best Fiction Short Film
- Best Cinematography
- Best Costume Design
- Best Editing
- Best Original Music
- Best Production Design
- Best Sound
- Best Visual Effects

=== Special awards ===
- Honorary Award – since 1976
- César des Césars – only in 1985 and 1995
- Prix Daniel Toscan du Plantier – since 2008
- Trophée César & Techniques – since 2011
- Médaille d'Or – only in 2015
- César & Techniques Special Award – only between 2015 and 2017
- César & Techniques Innovation Award – since 2018
- César du public – since 2018

=== Retired awards ===
- Best Film from the European Union (2002–2004)
- Best Poster (1986–1990)
- Best Producer (1995–1996)
- Best Original Screenplay or Adaptation (1976–2005)
- Best French Language Film (1984–1986)
- Best Short Film (1992–2021)

== Ceremonies ==
Edition	Date	President(s)	Host(s)	Best Film
1st César Awards	3 April 1976	Jean Gabin	Pierre Tchernia	Le Vieux Fusil
2nd César Awards	19 February 1977	Lino Ventura	Pierre Tchernia	Monsieur Klein
3rd César Awards	4 February 1978	Jeanne Moreau	Pierre Tchernia	Providence
4th César Awards	3 February 1979	Charles Vanel	Pierre Tchernia and Jean-Claude Brialy	L'Argent des autres
5th César Awards	2 February 1980	Jean Marais	Pierre Tchernia and Peter Ustinov	Tess
6th César Awards	31 January 1981	Yves Montand	Pierre Tchernia	The Last Metro
7th César Awards	27 February 1982	Orson Welles	Jacques Martin and Pierre Tchernia	Quest for Fire
8th César Awards	26 February 1983	Catherine Deneuve	Jean-Claude Brialy	La Balance
9th César Awards	3 March 1984	Gene Kelly	Léon Zitrone	(Tie) À nos amours & Le Bal
10th César Awards	3 February 1985	Simone Signoret	Pierre Tchernia	My New Partner
11th César Awards	22 February 1986	Madeleine Renaud and Jean-Louis Barrault	Michel Drucker	Three Men and a Cradle
12th César Awards	7 March 1987	Sean Connery	Michel Drucker and Pierre Tchernia	Thérèse
13th César Awards	12 March 1988	Miloš Forman	Michel Drucker and Jane Birkin	Au revoir les enfants
14th César Awards	4 March 1989	Peter Ustinov	Pierre Tchernia	Camille Claudel
15th César Awards	4 March 1990	Kirk Douglas	Ève Ruggieri	Too Beautiful for You
16th César Awards	9 March 1991	Sophia Loren	Richard Bohringer	Cyrano de Bergerac
17th César Awards	22 February 1992	Michèle Morgan	Frédéric Mitterrand	Tous les Matins du Monde
18th César Awards	8 March 1993	Marcello Mastroianni	Frédéric Mitterrand	Savage Nights
19th César Awards	26 February 1994	Gérard Depardieu	Fabrice Luchini and Clémentine Célarié	Smoking / No Smoking
20th César Awards	25 February 1995	Alain Delon	Jean-Claude Brialy and Pierre Tchernia	Wild Reeds
21st César Awards	3 February 1996	Philippe Noiret	Antoine de Caunes	La Haine
22nd César Awards	8 February 1997	Annie Girardot	Antoine de Caunes	Ridicule
23rd César Awards	28 February 1998	Juliette Binoche	Antoine de Caunes	Same Old Song
24th César Awards	6 March 1999	Isabelle Huppert	Antoine de Caunes	The Dreamlife of Angels
25th César Awards	19 February 2000	Alain Delon	Alain Chabat	Venus Beauty Institute
26th César Awards	24 February 2001	Daniel Auteuil	Édouard Baer	The Taste of Others
27th César Awards	2 March 2002	Nathalie Baye	Édouard Baer	Amélie
28th César Awards	22 February 2003	—	Géraldine Pailhas	The Pianist
29th César Awards	21 February 2004	Fanny Ardant	Gad Elmaleh	The Barbarian Invasions
30th César Awards	26 February 2005	Isabelle Adjani	Gad Elmaleh	Games of Love and Chance
31st César Awards	25 February 2006	Carole Bouquet	Valérie Lemercier	The Beat That My Heart Skipped
32nd César Awards	24 February 2007	Claude Brasseur	Valérie Lemercier	Lady Chatterley
33rd César Awards	22 February 2008	Jean Rochefort	Antoine de Caunes	The Secret of the Grain
34th César Awards	27 February 2009	Charlotte Gainsbourg	Antoine de Caunes	Séraphine
35th César Awards	27 February 2010	Marion Cotillard	Valérie Lemercier and Gad Elmaleh	A Prophet
36th César Awards	25 February 2011	Jodie Foster	Antoine de Caunes	Of Gods and Men
37th César Awards	24 February 2012	Guillaume Canet	Antoine de Caunes	The Artist
38th César Awards	22 February 2013	Jamel Debbouze	Antoine de Caunes	Amour
39th César Awards	28 February 2014	François Cluzet	Cécile de France	Me, Myself and Mum
40th César Awards	20 February 2015	Dany Boon	Édouard Baer	Timbuktu
41st César Awards	26 February 2016	Claude Lelouch	Florence Foresti	Fatima
42nd César Awards	24 February 2017	—	Jérôme Commandeur	Elle
43rd César Awards	2 March 2018	Vanessa Paradis	Manu Payet	BPM (Beats per Minute)
44th César Awards	22 February 2019	Kristin Scott Thomas	Kad Merad	Custody
45th César Awards	28 February 2020	Sandrine Kiberlain	Florence Foresti	Les Misérables
46th César Awards	12 March 2021	Roschdy Zem	Marina Foïs	Bye Bye Morons
47th César Awards	25 February 2022	Danièle Thompson	Antoine de Caunes	Lost Illusions
48th César Awards	24 February 2023	Tahar Rahim	Emmanuelle Devos, Léa Drucker, Eye Haïdara, Leïla Bekhti, Jérôme Commandeur, Ahmed Sylla, Jamel Debbouze, Alex Lutz and Raphaël Personnaz	The Night of the 12th
49th César Awards	23 February 2024	Valérie Lemercier	Ariane Ascaride, Bérénice Bejo, Dali Benssalah, Juliette Binoche, Dany Boon, Bastien Bouillon, Audrey Diwan, Ana Girardot, Diane Kruger, Benoît Magimel, Paul Mirabel, Nadia Tereszkiewicz and Jean-Pascal Zadi	Anatomy of a Fall
50th César Awards	28 February 2025	Catherine Deneuve	Jean-Pascal Zadi	Emilia Pérez
51st César Awards	26 February 2026	Camille Cottin	Benjamin Lavernhe	The Ties That Bind Us

== Overall ==
=== Films that received five or more César Awards ===
Film	Year	Noms.	Wins
Cyrano de Bergerac	1990	13	10
The Last Metro	1980	12	10
A Prophet	2009	13	9
The Beat That My Heart Skipped	2005	10	8
Lost Illusions	2022	15	7
Same Old Song	1997	12	7
Emilia Pérez	2024	12	7
All the World's Mornings	1991	11	7
The Pianist	2002	10	7
Goodbye, Children	1987	9	7
Séraphine	2008	9	7
Providence	1977	8	7
Timbuktu	2015	8	7
The Artist	2012	10	6
Thérèse	1986	10	6
Camille Claudel	1988	12	5
Queen Margot	1994	12	5
A Very Long Engagement	2004	12	5
Annette	2022	11	5
Too Beautiful For You	1989	11	5
La Vie en Rose	2007	11	5
Amour	2013	10	5
Me, Myself and Mum	2014	10	5
Lady Chatterley	2007	9	5
Smoking/No Smoking	1993	9	5

=== Films that received 10 or more César Award nominations ===
Film	Year	Noms.	Wins
Lost Illusions	2022	15	7
Amélie	2001	13	4
Cyrano de Bergerac	1990	13	10
Subway	1985	13	3
A Prophet	2009	13	9
Polisse	2012	13	2
Camille redouble	2013	13	0
See You Up There	2018	13	5
BPM (Beats per Minute)	2018	13	6
8 Women	2002	12	0
The Last Metro	1980	12	10
Tchao Pantin	1984	12	5
Camille Claudel	1988	12	5
Queen Margot	1994	12	5
Ridicule	1996	12	4
Same Old Song	1997	12	7
A Very Long Engagement	2004	12	5
The Minister	2012	12	3
An Officer and a Spy	2020	12	3
Les Misérables	2020	12	4
Emilia Pérez	2025	12	7
All the World's Mornings	1991	11	7
Nelly and Mr. Arnaud	1995	11	2
A Secret	2007	11	1
À l'origine	2009	11	1
Of Gods and Men	2010	11	3
Those Who Love Me Can Take the Train	1998	11	3
Too Beautiful for You	1989	11	5
La Vie en Rose	2007	11	5
Marguerite	2016	11	4
Elle	2017	11	2
Frantz	2017	11	1
My Golden Days	2016	11	1
La Belle Époque	2020	11	3
Annette	2022	11	5
Public Enemy Number One	2008	10	3
The Beat That My Heart Skipped	2005	10	8
Clean Up	1981	10	0
The Pianist	2002	10	7
Thérèse	1986	10	6
Welcome	2009	10	0
The Artist	2012	10	6
Farewell, My Queen	2013	10	3
Amour	2013	10	5
Me, Myself and Mum	2014	10	5
Custody	2019	10	4
Saint Laurent	2015	10	1
Sink or Swim	2019	10	1
C'est la vie!	2018	10	0
Portrait of a Lady on Fire	2020	10	1
Aline	2022	10	1

=== Directors with two or more awards ===
Director	Noms.	Wins.
Jacques Audiard	8	4
Roman Polanski	5	5
Alain Resnais	8	2
Bertrand Tavernier	7	2
Jean-Jacques Annaud	4	2
Claude Sautet	4	2
Abdellatif Kechiche	3	2

=== Actors with 7 or more nominations ===
Actor/Actress	Noms.	Wins
Gérard Depardieu	17	2
Isabelle Huppert	17	2
Daniel Auteuil	14	2
Catherine Deneuve	14	2
Karin Viard	13	3
Juliette Binoche	11	1
Fabrice Luchini	11	1
Miou-Miou	11	1
François Cluzet	11	1
Nathalie Baye	10	4
Catherine Frot	10	2
Isabelle Adjani	9	5
Dominique Blanc	9	4
Sandrine Kiberlain	9	2
Michel Serrault	8	3
André Dussollier	8	3
Fanny Ardant	8	2
Marion Cotillard	8	2
Jean-Hugues Anglade	8	1
Emmanuelle Béart	8	1
Noémie Lvovsky	8	0
Sandrine Bonnaire	7	2
Charlotte Gainsbourg	7	2
Adèle Haenel	7	2
Vincent Cassel	7	1
Louis Garrel	7	1
Virginie Efira	7	1
Jean-Pierre Marielle	7	0
Lambert Wilson	7	0
Romain Duris	7	0

=== "Big Five" winners and nominees ===
==== Winners ====
- The Last Metro (1980)
1. Best Film: François Truffaut
2. Best Director: François Truffaut
3. Best Actor: Gérard Depardieu
4. Best Actress: Catherine Deneuve
5. Best Screenplay, Dialogue or Adaptation: Suzanne Schiffman and François Truffaut
- Amour (2013)
1. Best Film: Michael Haneke & Margaret Ménégoz
2. Best Director: Michael Haneke
3. Best Actor: Jean-Louis Trintignant
4. Best Actress: Emmanuelle Riva
5. Best Original Screenplay: Michael Haneke

==== Nominees ====
Four awards won

- Smoking/No Smoking (1993): Best Actress (Sabine Azéma)
- Too Beautiful for You (1989): Best Actor (Gérard Depardieu)

Three awards won

- Cyrano de Bergerac (1990): Best Actress (Anne Brochet) and Original Screenplay or Adaptation (Jean-Claude Carrière and Jean-Paul Rappeneau)
- Same Old Song (1997): Best Actress (Sabine Azéma) and Director (Alain Resnais)
- The Artist (2011): Best Actor (Jean Dujardin) and Original Screenplay (Michel Hazanavicius)
- Custody (2017): Best Actor (Denis Ménochet) and Director (Xavier Legrand)

=== Most acting wins and nominations for a film ===
Total	Wins	Film	Actors
7	1	Polisse	Actress: Marina Foïs and Karin Viard; Supporting Actor: Nicolas Duvauchelle, JoeyStarr and Frédéric Pierrot; Supporting Actress: Karole Rocher; Promising Actress Naidra Ayadi (won)
7	0	Camille redouble	Actress: Noémie Lvovsky; Supporting Actor: Samir Guesmi and Michel Vuillermoz; Supporting Actress: Judith Chemla and Yolande Moreau; Promising Actress Julia Faure and India Hair
5	3	Same Old Song	Actor: André Dussollier (won); Actress: Sabine Azéma; Supporting Actor: Jean-Pierre Bacri (won) and Lambert Wilson; Supporting Actress: Agnès Jaoui (won)
4	3	Queen Margot	Actress: Isabelle Adjani (won); Supporting Actor: Jean-Hugues Anglade (won); Supporting Actress: Dominique Blanc and Virna Lisi (won)
4	2	The Last Metro	Actor: Gérard Depardieu (won); Actress: Catherine Deneuve (won); Supporting Actor: Heinz Bennent; Supporting Actress: Andréa Ferréol
4	1	Elle	Actress: Isabelle Huppert (won); Supporting Actor: Laurent Lafitte; Supporting Actress: Anne Consigny; Promising Actor: Jonas Bloquet
4	1	La Famille Bélier	Actor: François Damiens; Actress: Karin Viard; Supporting Actor: Éric Elmosnino; Promising Actress: Louane Emera (won)
4	1	Too Beautiful for You	Actor: Gérard Depardieu; Actress: Josiane Balasko and Carole Bouquet (won); Supporting Actor: Roland Blanche
4	0	Amélie	Actress: Audrey Tautou; Supporting Actor: Jamel Debbouze and Rufus; Supporting Actress: Isabelle Nanty
3	2	Amour	Actor: Jean-Louis Trintignant (won); Actress: Emmanuelle Riva (won); Supporting Actress: Isabelle Huppert
3	2	What's in a Name	Actor: Patrick Bruel; Supporting Actor: Guillaume de Tonquédec (won); Supporting Actress: Valérie Benguigui (won)
3	1	Camille Claudel	Actor: Gérard Depardieu; Actress: Isabelle Adjani (won); Supporting Actor: Alain Cuny
3	1	Hippocrate	Actor: Vincent Lacoste; Supporting Actor: Reda Kateb (won); Supporting Actress: Marianne Denicourt
3	1	It's Only the End of the World	Actor: Gaspard Ulliel (won); Supporting Actor: Vincent Cassel; Supporting Actress: Nathalie Baye
3	1	La Vie en rose	Actress: Marion Cotillard (won); Supporting actor: Pascal Greggory; Supporting Actress: Sylvie Testud
3	1	Yves Saint Laurent	Actor: Pierre Niney (won); Supporting Actor: Guillaume Gallienne; Supporting Actress: Charlotte Le Bon
3	0	Ridicule	Actor: Charles Berling; Supporting Actor: Bernard Giraudeau and Jean Rochefort
3	0	Saint Laurent	Actor: Gaspard Ulliel; Supporting Actor: Louis Garrel and Jérémie Renier

== See also ==
- Academy Awards
- British Academy Film Awards
- Lumière Awards
- Louis Delluc Prize
- Magritte Award
