= Sidonie Dumas =

French film producer

- Born: Sidonie Rebecca Seydoux Fornier de Clausonne; 28 April 1967 (age 59); Boulogne-Billancourt, France
- Occupations: Film producer; television producer; businesswoman
- Years active: 1999–present
- Family: Seydoux

Sidonie Dumas (née Sidonie Rebecca Seydoux Fornier de Clausonne; born 28 April 1967 in Boulogne-Billancourt) is a French film and television producer. She has been the CEO of Gaumont since 2004 and its majority shareholder through the family holding company Ciné Par since 2017. A member of the Seydoux family, she is the daughter of Nicolas Seydoux, niece of Pathé chairman Jérôme Seydoux and cousin of actress Léa Seydoux.

In 2014, she was ranked first by Télérama on their list of the "Top 50" people in French cinema who "have the power and the talent to raise money, create films, make them popular". In 2024, she received the International Emmy Directorate Award.

== Filmography ==
=== Film ===
Year	Title	Credits	Director	Notes
1999	Mille bornes		Alain Beigel	
2000	Épouse-moi	Associate producer	Harriet Marin	
2003	Father and Sons		Michel Boujenah	
2003	Qui perd gagne !		Laurent Bénégui	
2005	Virgil	Executive producer	Mabrouk El Mechri	
2008	JCVD	Line producer	Mabrouk El Mechri	
2009	Splice	Executive producer	Vincenzo Natali	
2009	The Last Flight	Executive producer	Karim Dridi	
2010	Twelve		Joel Schumacher	
2010	Last Night		Massy Tadjedin	
2012	The Chef		Daniel Cohen	
2013	Adore	Executive producer	Anne Fontaine	
2013	Only God Forgives		Nicolas Winding Refn	
2013	Turning Tide		Christophe Offenstein	
2013	Love Is the Perfect Crime		Arnaud and Jean-Marie Larrieu	
2013	The Young and Prodigious T. S. Spivet	Executive producer	Jean-Pierre Jeunet	
2014	Libre et assoupi		Benjamin Guedj	
2014	Mea culpa		Fred Cavayé	
2014	Gemma Bovery		Anne Fontaine	
2014	The Gate		Régis Wargnier	
2015	I Kissed a Girl		Noémie Saglio and Maxime Govare	
2015	Through the Air		Fred Grivois	
2015	The Parisian Bitch, Princess of Hearts		Éloïse Lang and Noémie Saglio	
2015	On voulait tout casser		Philippe Guillard	
2015	Floride	Co-producer	Philippe Le Guay	
2015	Courted		Christian Vincent	
2015	Belle & Sebastian: The Adventure Continues		Christian Duguay	
2015	Vicky		Denis Imbert	
2016	The Visitors: Bastille Day		Jean-Marie Poiré	
2016	Up for Love		Laurent Tirard	
2016	The Neon Demon		Nicolas Winding Refn	
2016	Hibou		Ramzy Bedia	
2016	Odd Job		Pascal Chaumeil	
2016	Heartstrings		Michel Boujenah	
2016	Ares		Jean-Patrick Benes	
2016	Patients	Co-producer	Grand Corps Malade and Mehdi Idir	
2017	Return to Montauk		Volker Schlöndorff	
2017	Le Manoir		Tony Datis	
2017	Demain et tous les autres jours		Noémie Lvovsky	
2017	Maryline		Guillaume Gallienne	
2017	Belle and Sebastien: Friends for Life		Clovis Cornillac	
2018	Rolling to You		Franck Dubosc	
2018	Monsieur je-sais-tout		Stéphan Archinard and François Prévôt-Leygonie	
2018	Raising Colors		Hélène Fillières	
2018	Edmond	Co-producer	Alexis Michalik	
2019	Chamboultout	Co-producer	Éric Lavaine	
2019	School Life	Co-producer	Grand Corps Malade and Mehdi Idir	
2019	Ibiza	Executive producer	Arnaud Lemort	
2019	Point Blank	Executive producer	Joe Lynch	
2019	Trois Jours et une vie		Nicolas Boukhrief	
2019	#Iamhere		Éric Lartigau	
2020	Papi Sitter		Philippe Guillard	
2020	Tout simplement noir		Jean-Pascal Zadi and John Wax	
2020	Aline		Valérie Lemercier	
2020	Rogue City		Olivier Marchal	
2021	Le petit piaf	Co-producer	Gérard Jugnot	
2021	Lost Illusions		Xavier Giannoli	
2021	Kung Fu Zohra	Co-producer	Mabrouk El Mechri	
2021	Lords of Scam	Line producer	Guillaume Nicloux	
2022	Rumba la vie		Franck Dubosc	
2022	The Biggest Fan		Philippe Guillard	
2022	Neneh Superstar		Ramzi Ben Sliman	
2022	Menteur		Olivier Baroux	
2022	Belle et Sébastien : Nouvelle Génération		Pierre Coré	
2022	Couleurs de l'incendie		Clovis Cornillac	
2022	Overdose		Olivier Marchal	
2023	Un homme heureux		Tristan Séguéla	
2023	The Edge of the Blade		Vincent Perez	
2023	Yo Mama		Leïla Sy and Amadou Mariko	
2023	Out of Season		Stéphane Brizé	
2023	Noël joyeux		Clément Michel	
2023	Wingwomen		Mélanie Laurent	
2024	Black Tea	Co-producer	Abderrahmane Sissako	
2024	Almost Legal		Max Mauroux	
2024	À toute allure		Lucas Bernard	
2024	Un ours dans le Jura		Franck Dubosc	
2024	C'est le monde à l'envers !		Nicolas Vanier	
2025	Squad 36		Olivier Marchal	
2025	Once Upon My Mother		Ken Scott	
2025	Moon le panda	Executive producer	Gilles de Maistre	
2025	The Biggest Fan		Maria Torres	
2025	Le Grand Déplacement		Jean-Pascal Zadi	
2025	Les Orphelins		Olivier Schneider	
2025	The Wizard of the Kremlin		Olivier Assayas	
2025	L'Âme idéale		Alice Vial	
2026	Les Rayons et les Ombres		Xavier Giannoli	

=== Television ===
Year	Title	Credit	Notes
2013	Love Is Dead	Executive producer	Pilot
2013–2015	Hannibal	Executive producer	39 episodes
2013–2015	Hemlock Grove	Executive producer	33 episodes
2014	Resistance	Delegate producer	6 episodes
2014–2015	Hôtel de la plage	Producer	12 episodes
2014	Interventions	Executive producer / delegate producer	4 episodes
2014	La trouvaille de Juliette	Executive producer	TV movie
2015	Narcos	Producer	10 episodes
2015–2021	F Is for Family	Executive producer	25 episodes
2017	The Frozen Dead	Executive producer	6 episodes
2017	Belle and Sebastian	Executive producer	
2017–2025	L'Art du crime	Executive producer	24 episodes
2018–2021	Narcos: Mexico	Executive producer	21 episodes
2019	Les Ombres de Lisieux	Executive producer	TV movie
2020–2022	El Presidente	Executive producer	16 episodes
2020–2022	Barbarians	Executive producer	2 episodes
2020–2021	Stillwater	Executive producer	11 episodes
2021–2023	Lupin	Producer	8 episodes
2021	Plan B	Executive producer	6 episodes
2021	Nona and Her Daughters	Producer	9 episodes
2022	Do, Re & Mi	Producer	5 episodes
2022	Ce que Pauline ne vous dit pas	Executive producer	Miniseries; 4 episodes
2022	Hors Saison	Executive producer	Miniseries; 6 episodes
2022	Samurai Rabbit: The Usagi Chronicles	Executive producer	20 episodes
2023	The Interpreter of Silence	Executive producer	Miniseries; 5 episodes
2023	Pamela Rose, la série	Producer	
2023	Pax Massilia	Executive producer	
2024	Pereviznytsya	Executive producer	5 episodes
2025	The Deal	Producer	6 episodes
2026	Unfamiliar	Executive producer	6 episodes
2026	The Hunt	Executive producer	6 episodes

== Awards and nominations ==
Award	Year	Category	Film	Result	Ref.
César Awards	2014	Best First Film (shared with Jean Cottin, Christophe Offenstein and Laurent Taïeb)	Turning Tide	Nominated	
César Awards	2016	Best First Film (shared with Kheiron and Simon Istolainen)	All Three of Us	Nominated	
César Awards	2021	Best First Film (shared with Jean-Pascal Zadi and John Wax)	Tout simplement noir	Nominated	
César Awards	2022	Best Film (shared with Alice Girard, Valérie Lemercier and Edouard Weil)	Aline	Nominated	
César Awards	2022	Best Film (shared with Olivier Delbosc and Xavier Giannoli)	Lost Illusions	Won	

== Honours ==
- 2013: Chevalier of the Legion of Honour
- 2021: Commandeur of the Ordre des Arts et des Lettres
- 2023: Officer of the Legion of Honour
- 2024: International Emmy Directorate Award
