= César Award for Best Fiction Short Film =

French film award

- Country: France
- Presented by: Académie des Arts et Techniques du Cinéma
- First award: 1977
- Currently held by: Mort d'un Acteur (2026)
- Website: academie-cinema.org

The César Award for Best Fiction Short Film (French: César du meilleur court métrage de fiction) is an award presented annually by the Académie des Arts et Techniques du Cinéma from 1977 to 1991 and again since 2022.

== Background ==
The César Award for Best Fiction Short Film, together with the award for Best Documentary Short Film, was first awarded in 1977 and presented annually until 1991. They were replaced by the integrated César Award for Best Short Film (1992–2021).

In September 2021, the governing association of the César Awards voted to create two new awards for Best Visual Effects and Best Documentary Short Film, both of which were introduced in the 47th ceremony (2022). As a result, the award for Best Fiction Short Film was also reinstated.

== Winners and nominees ==
=== 1970s ===
Year	English title	Original title	Director(s)
1977 (2nd)	Comment ça va je m'en fous		François de Roubaix
1977 (2nd)	Chaleur d'été		Jean-Louis Leconte
1977 (2nd)	Le Destin de Jean-Noël		Gabriel Auer
1977 (2nd)	L'Enfant prisonnier		Jean-Michel Carré
1977 (2nd)	L'hiver approche		Georges Bensoussan
1977 (2nd)	La Nuit du beau marin peut-être		Frank Verpillat
1978 (3rd)	500 Grammes de foie de veau		Henri Glaeser
1978 (3rd)	Le Blanc des yeux		Henry Colomer
1978 (3rd)	Je veux mourir pour la patrie		Jean-Paul Sartre and Mosco Boucault
1978 (3rd)	Sauf dimanches et fêtes		François Ode
1978 (3rd)	Temps souterrain		David András
1979 (4th)	Dégustation maison		Sophie Tatischeff
1979 (4th)	Le Chien de M. Michel		Jean-Jacques Beineix
1979 (4th)	Jeudi 7 avril		Peter Kassovitz
1979 (4th)	L'Ornière		François Dupeyron

=== 1980s ===
Year	English title	Original title	Director(s)
1980 (5th)	Dog's Dialogue	Colloque de chiens	Raoul Ruiz
1980 (5th)	Nuit féline		Gérard Marx
1980 (5th)	Sibylle		Robert Cappa
1981 (6th)	Toine		Edmond Séchan
1981 (6th)	Le Bruit des jambes de Lucie		Anne Quesemand
1981 (6th)	La Découverte		Arthur Joffé
1981 (6th)	Vive la mariée		Patrice Noïa
1982 (7th)	Les Photos d'Alix		Jean Eustache
1982 (7th)	Cher Alexandre		Anne Lemonier
1982 (7th)	Le Rat noir d'Amérique		Jérôme Enrico
1982 (7th)	The Subtil Concept		Gérard Krawczyk
1983 (8th)	Bluff		Philippe Bensoussan
1983 (8th)	Canta Gitano		Tony Gatlif
1983 (8th)	Merlin ou le cours de l'or		Arthur Joffé
1983 (8th)	La Saisie		Yves-Noël Francois
1984 (9th)	Star Suburb: la banlieue des étoiles		Stéphane Drouot
1984 (9th)	Coup de feu		Magali Clément
1984 (9th)	Panique au montage		Olivier Esmein
1984 (9th)	Toro Moreno		Gérard Krawczyk
1985 (10th)	Première Classe		Mehdi El Glaoui
1985 (10th)	La Combine de la girafe		Thomas Gilou
1985 (10th)	Homicide by night		Gérard Krawczyk
1985 (10th)	Oiseau de sang		Frédéric Ripert
1985 (10th)	Premiers mètres		Pierre Lévy
1986 (11th)	Grosse		Brigitte Roüan
1986 (11th)	La Consultation		Radovan Tadic
1986 (11th)	Dialogue de sourds		Bernard Nauer
1986 (11th)	Juste avant le mariage		Jacques Deschamps
1986 (11th)	The Book of Mary	Le Livre de Marie	Anne-Marie Miéville
1987 (12th)	La Goula		Roger Guillot
1987 (12th)	Alger la blanche		Cyril Collard
1987 (12th)	Les Arcandiers		Manuel Sanchez
1987 (12th)	Bel ragazzo		Georges Bensoussan
1987 (12th)	Bocetta revient de guerre		Jean-Pierre Sinapi
1987 (12th)	Bol de jour		Henri Gruvman
1987 (12th)	Le Bridge		Gilles Dagneau
1987 (12th)	Deobernique		Celia Canning and Raymond Gourrier
1987 (12th)	Joseph M		Jacques Cluzaud
1987 (12th)	Le Maître chanteur		Mathias Ledoux
1987 (12th)	Pauline épaulettes		Stéphanie de Mareuil
1987 (12th)	La poupée qui tousse		Farid Lahouassa
1987 (12th)	Sur le talus		Laurence Ferreira Barbosa
1987 (12th)	Synthétique opérette		Olivier Esmein
1987 (12th)	Torero hallucinogène		Stéphane Clavier
1987 (12th)	Triple sec		Yves Thomas
1987 (12th)	Une fille		Henri Herre
1987 (12th)	Zambinella		Catherine Laine Galode
1988 (13th)	Présence féminine		Éric Rochant
1988 (13th)	D'après Maria		Jean-Claude Robert
1988 (13th)	Pétition		Jean-Louis Comolli
1989 (14th)	Lamento		François Dupeyron
1989 (14th)	Bing Bang		Éric Woreth
1989 (14th)	New York 1935		Michèle Ferrand-Lafaye
1989 (14th)	Une femme pour l'hiver		Manuel Flèche

=== 1990s ===
Year	English title	Original title	Director(s)
1990 (15th)	Lune froide		Patrick Bouchitey
1990 (15th)	Ce qui me meut		Cédric Klapisch
1990 (15th)	Vol nuptial		Dominique Crèvecœur
1991 (16th)	Things I Like, Things I Don't Like	Foutaises	Jean-Pierre Jeunet
1991 (16th)	Deux pièces cuisine		Philippe Harel
1991 (16th)	Final		Irène Jouannet
1991 (16th)	Uhloz		Guy Jacques

=== 2020s ===
Year	English title	Original title	Director(s)
2022 (47th)	One and Thousand Nights	Les Mauvais Garçons	Élie Girard
2022 (47th)	Black Soldier	Soldat noir	Jimmy Laporal-Trésor
2022 (47th)	Decent People	Des gens bien	Maxime Roy
2022 (47th)	The Departure	Le Départ	Saïd Hamich Benlarbi
2022 (47th)	Tender Age	L'Âge tendre	Julien Gaspar-Oliveri
2023 (48th)	Bye Bye	Partir un jour	Amélie Bonnin
2023 (48th)	King David	Le Roi David	Lila Pinell
2023 (48th)	The Right Words	Haut les cœurs	Adrian Moyse Dullin
2023 (48th)	Women of Virtue	Les Vertueuses	Stéphanie Halfon
2024 (49th)	Expecting	L'Attente	Alice Douard
2024 (49th)	Boléro		Nans Laborde-Jourdàa
2024 (49th)	Fast	Rapide	Paul Rigoux
2024 (49th)	The Silent Ones	Les Silencieux	Basile Vuillemin
2025 (50th)	The Man Who Could Not Remain Silent	L'Homme qui ne se taisait pas	Nebojša Slijepčević
2025 (50th)	Boucan		Salomé Da Souza
2025 (50th)	Ce qui appartient à César		Violette Gitton
2025 (50th)	Queen Size		Avril Besson
2026 (51st)	Mort d'un Acteur		Ambroise Rateau
2026 (51st)	Big Boys Don't Cry		Arnaud Delmarle
2026 (51st)	Two People Exchanging Saliva	Deux personnes échangeant de la salive	Natalie Musteata and Alexandre Singh
2026 (51st)	Wonderwall		Róisín Burns

== See also ==
- Academy Award for Best Live Action Short Film
- BAFTA Award for Best Short Film
- European Film Award for Best Short Film
- Goya Award for Best Fictional Short Film
- César Award for Best Animated Short Film
- César Award for Best Documentary Short Film
