= Honorary César =

French national film award

- Country: France
- Presented by: Académie des Arts et Techniques du Cinéma
- First award: 1976
- Website: academie-cinema.org

The César Award is France's national film award. Recipients are selected by the members of the Académie des Arts et Techniques du Cinéma. The following are the recipients of the Honorary César award since its inception in 1976.

== Recipients ==
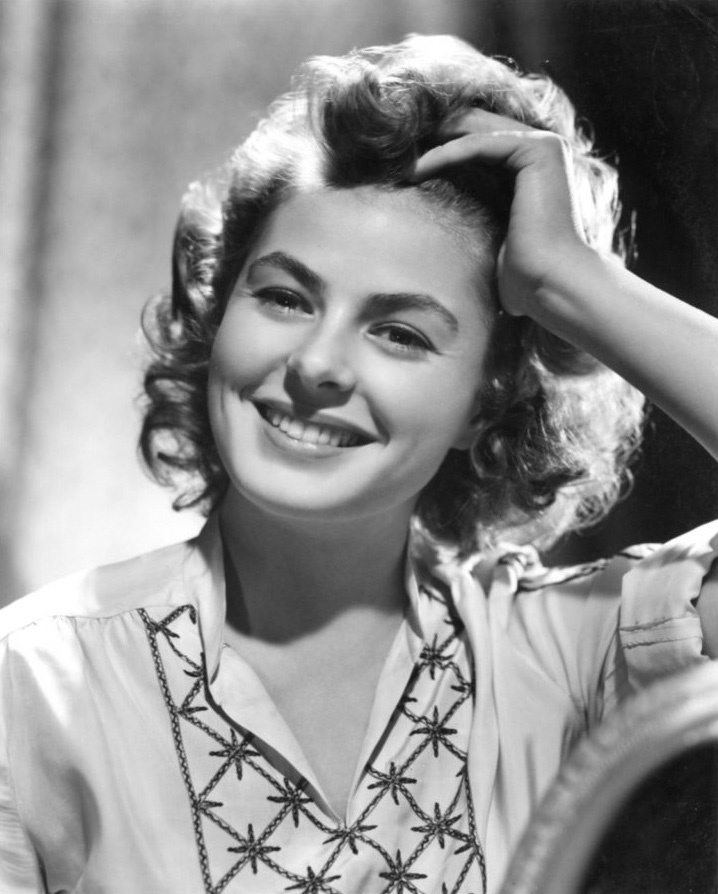
Ingrid Bergman was the inaugural winner in 1976.

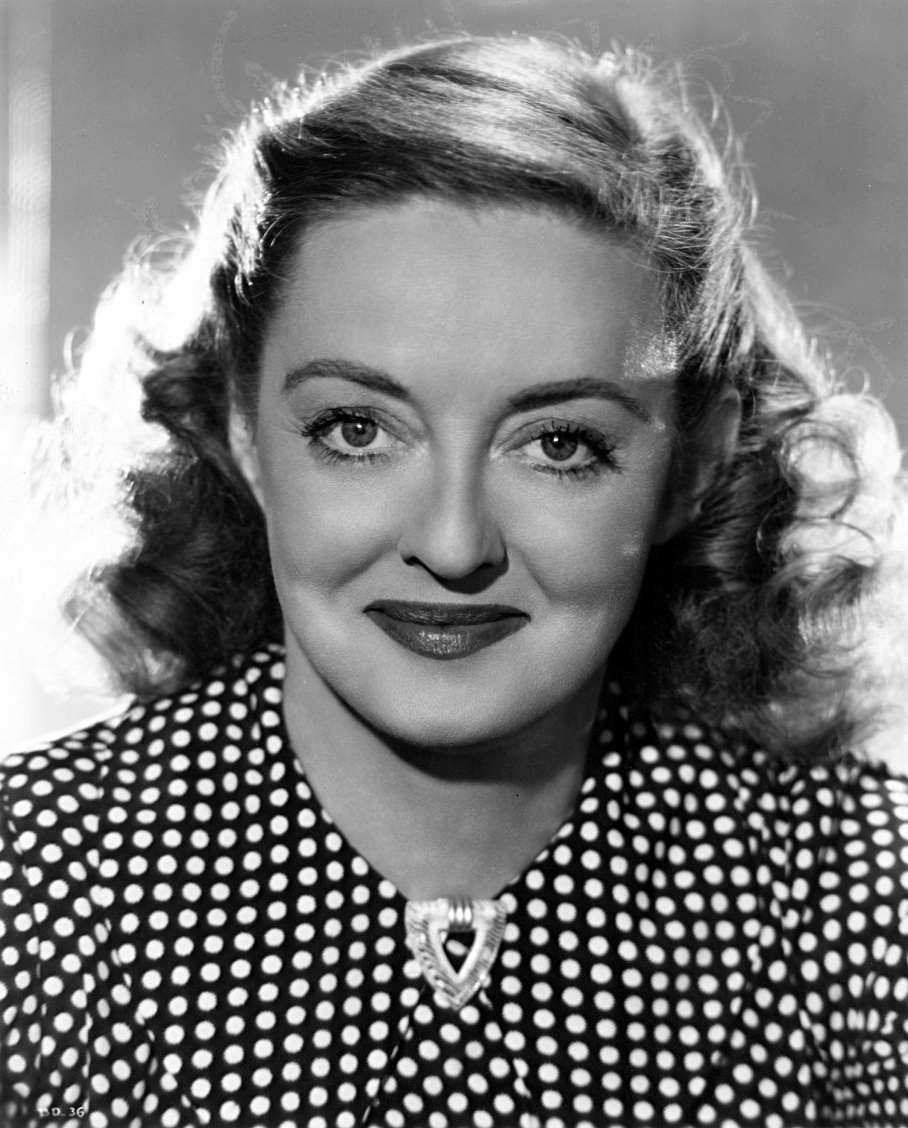
Bette Davis won in 1986.

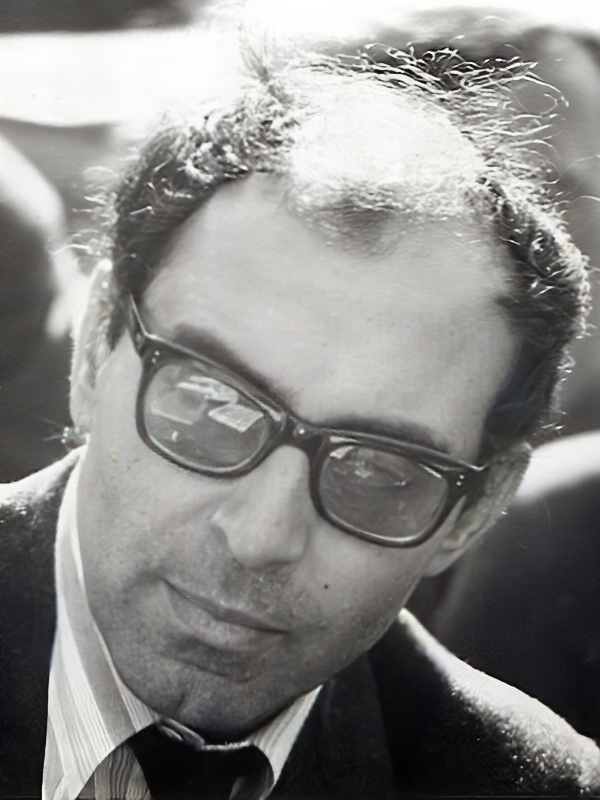
Jean-Luc Godard won twice in 1987 and 1998.

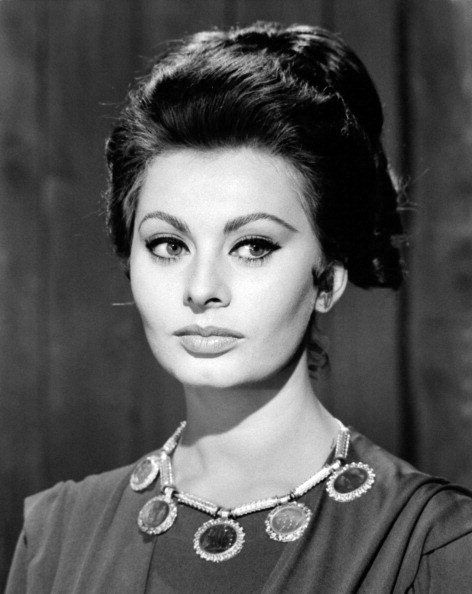
Sophia Loren won in 1991.

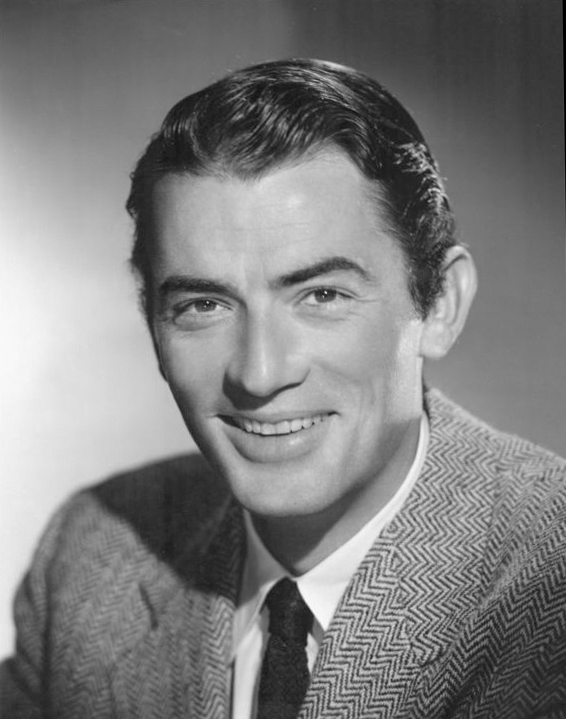
Gregory Peck won in 1995.

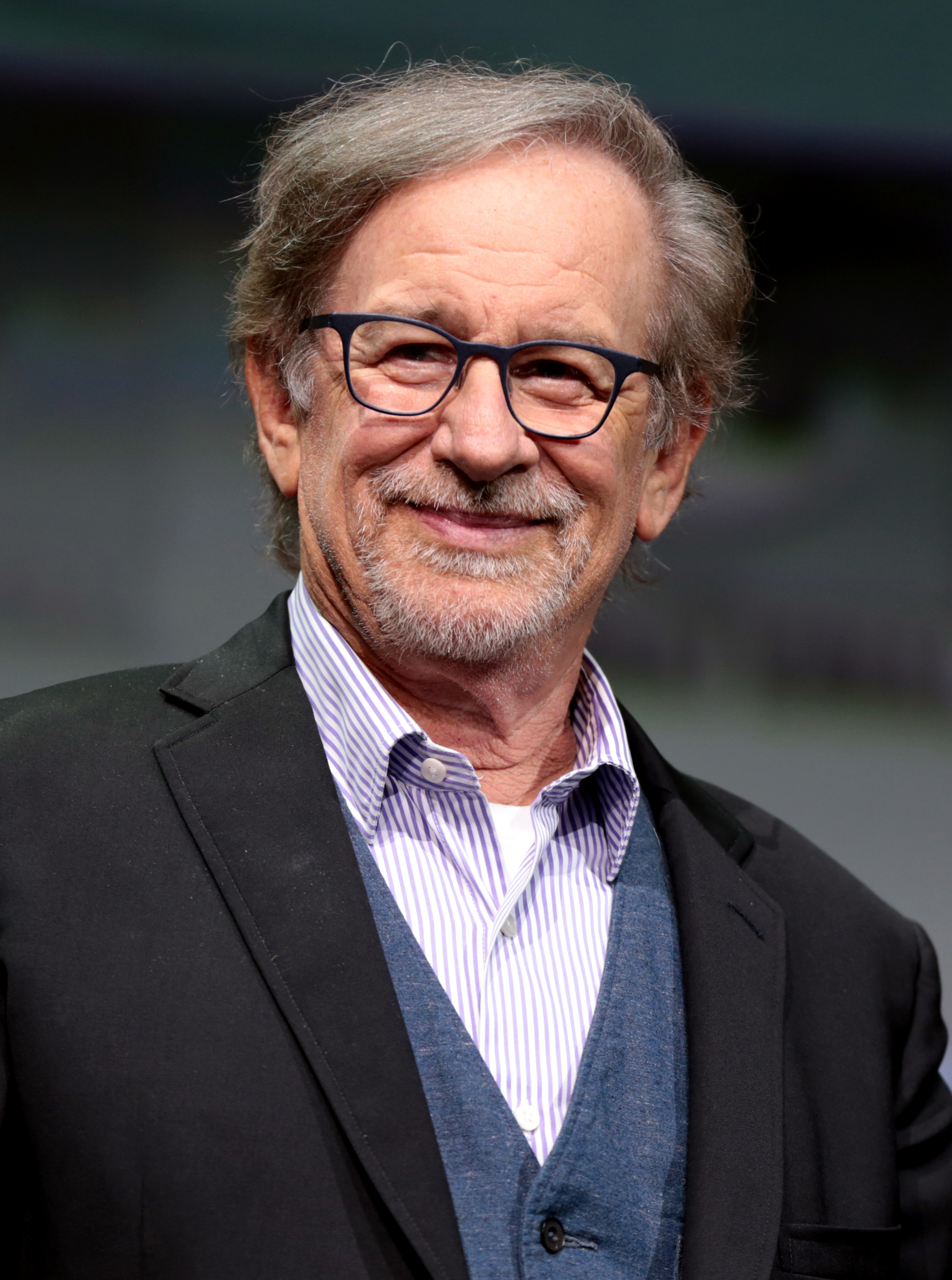
Steven Spielberg won in 1995.

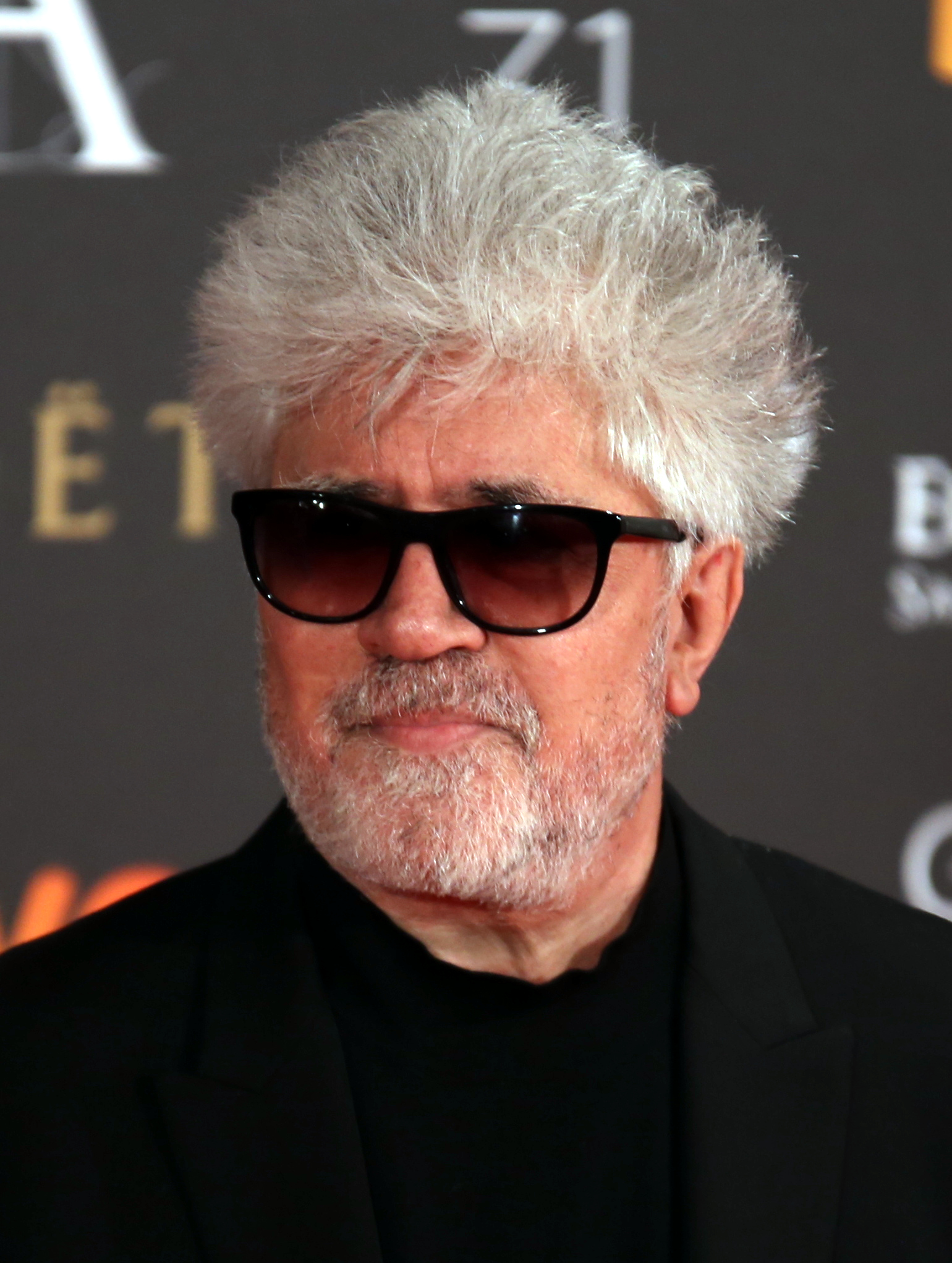
Pedro Almodovar won in 1999.

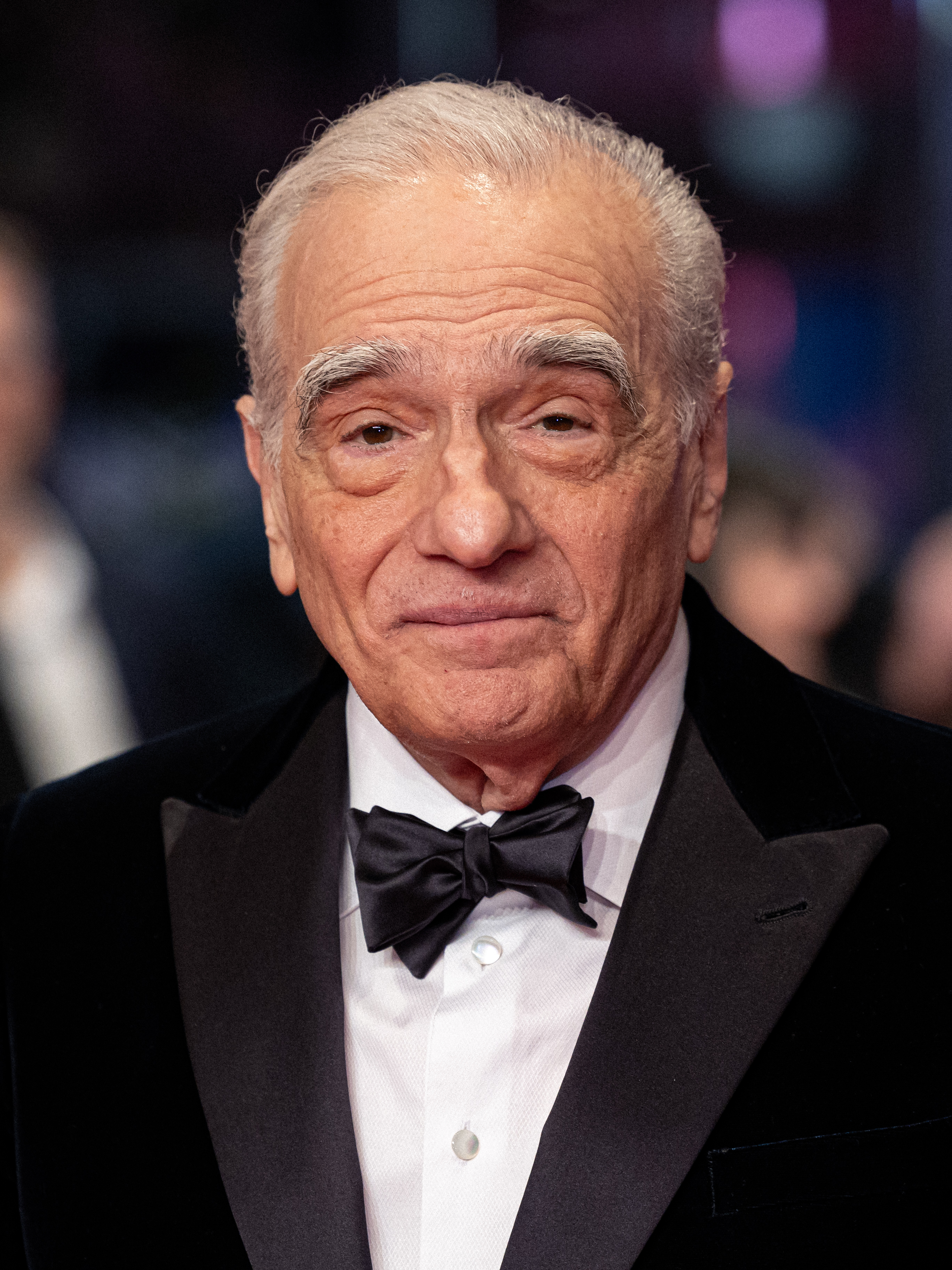
Martin Scorsese won in 2000.

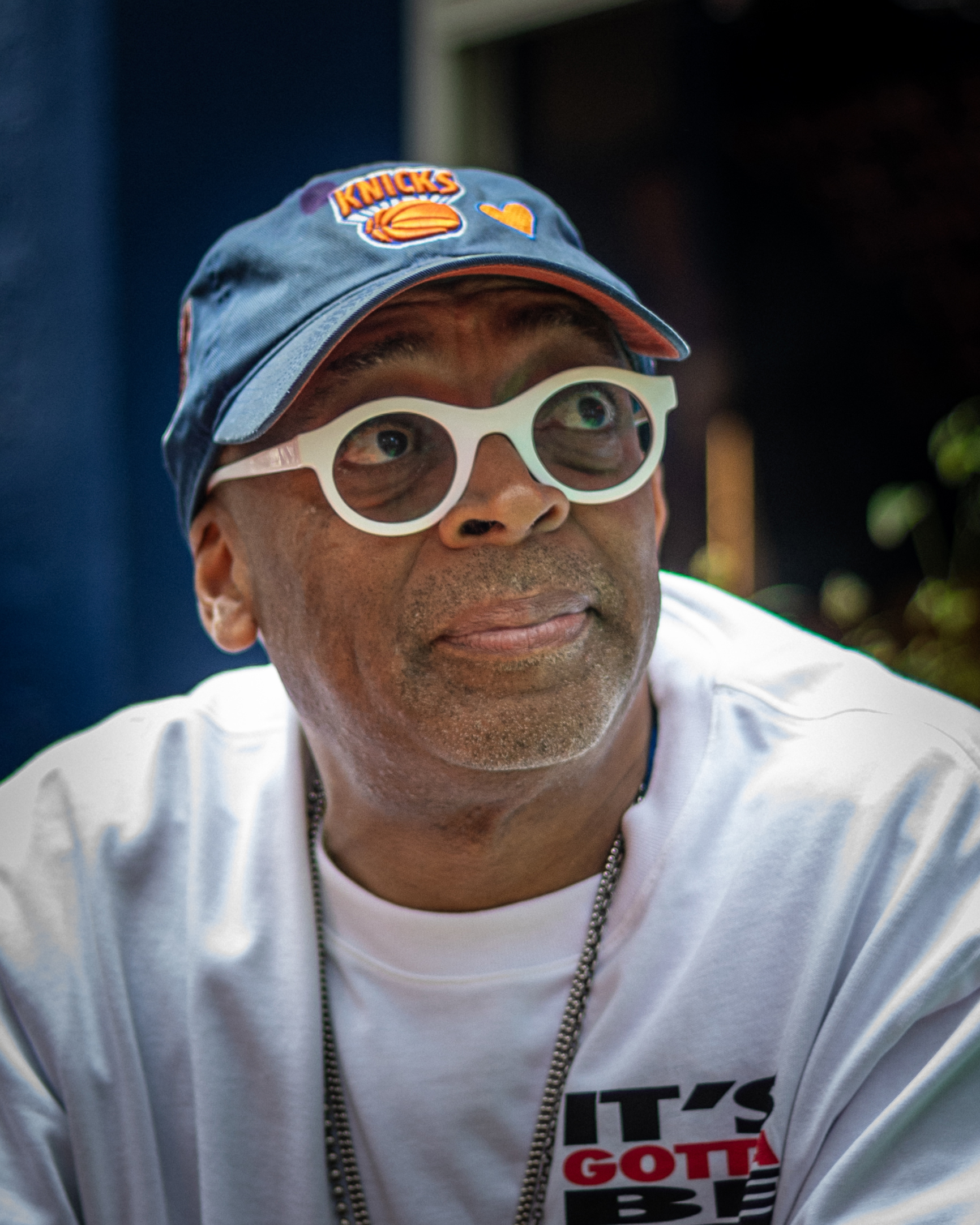
Spike Lee won in 2003.

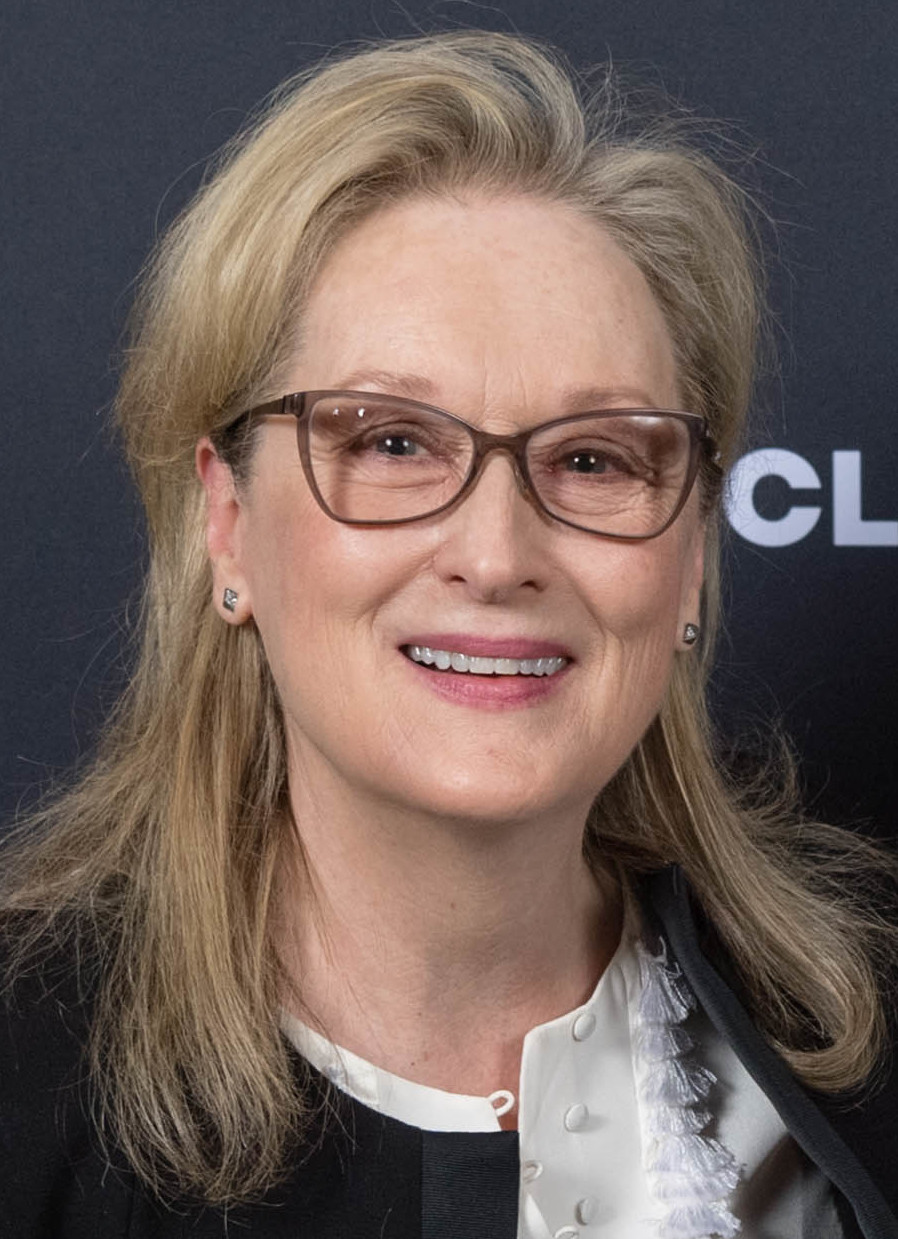
Meryl Streep won in 2003.

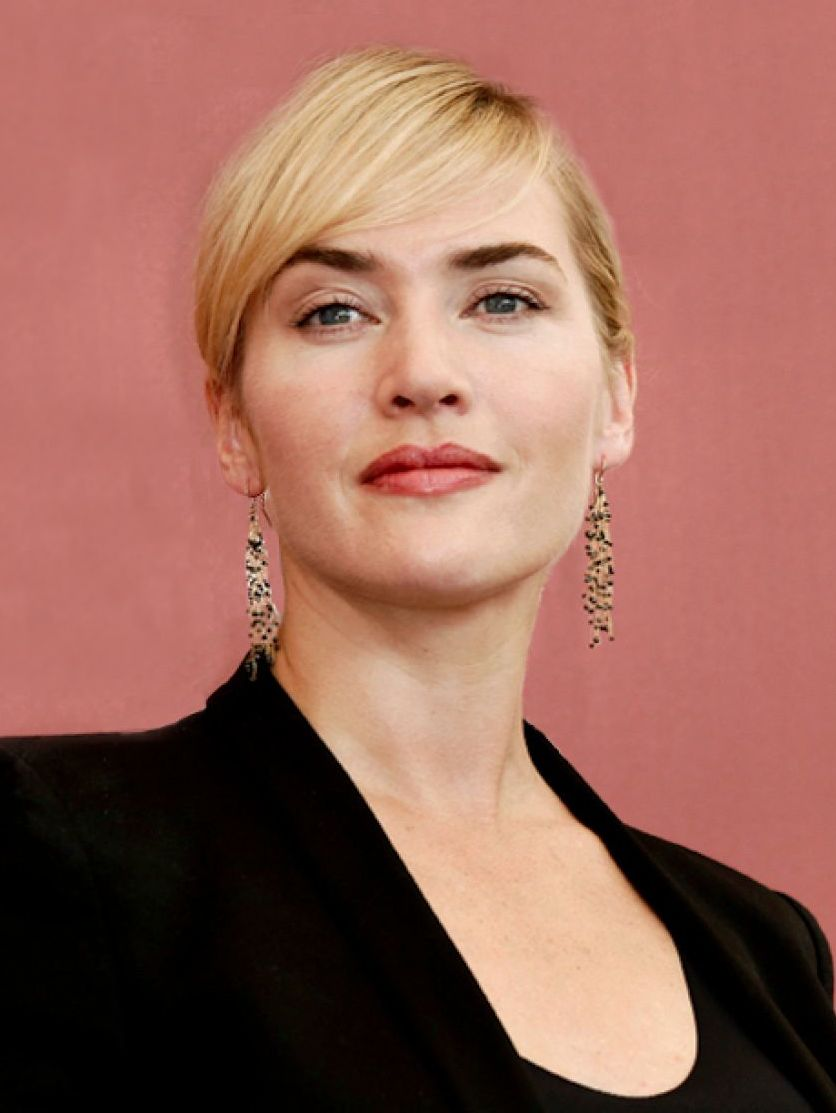
Kate Winslet won in 2012.

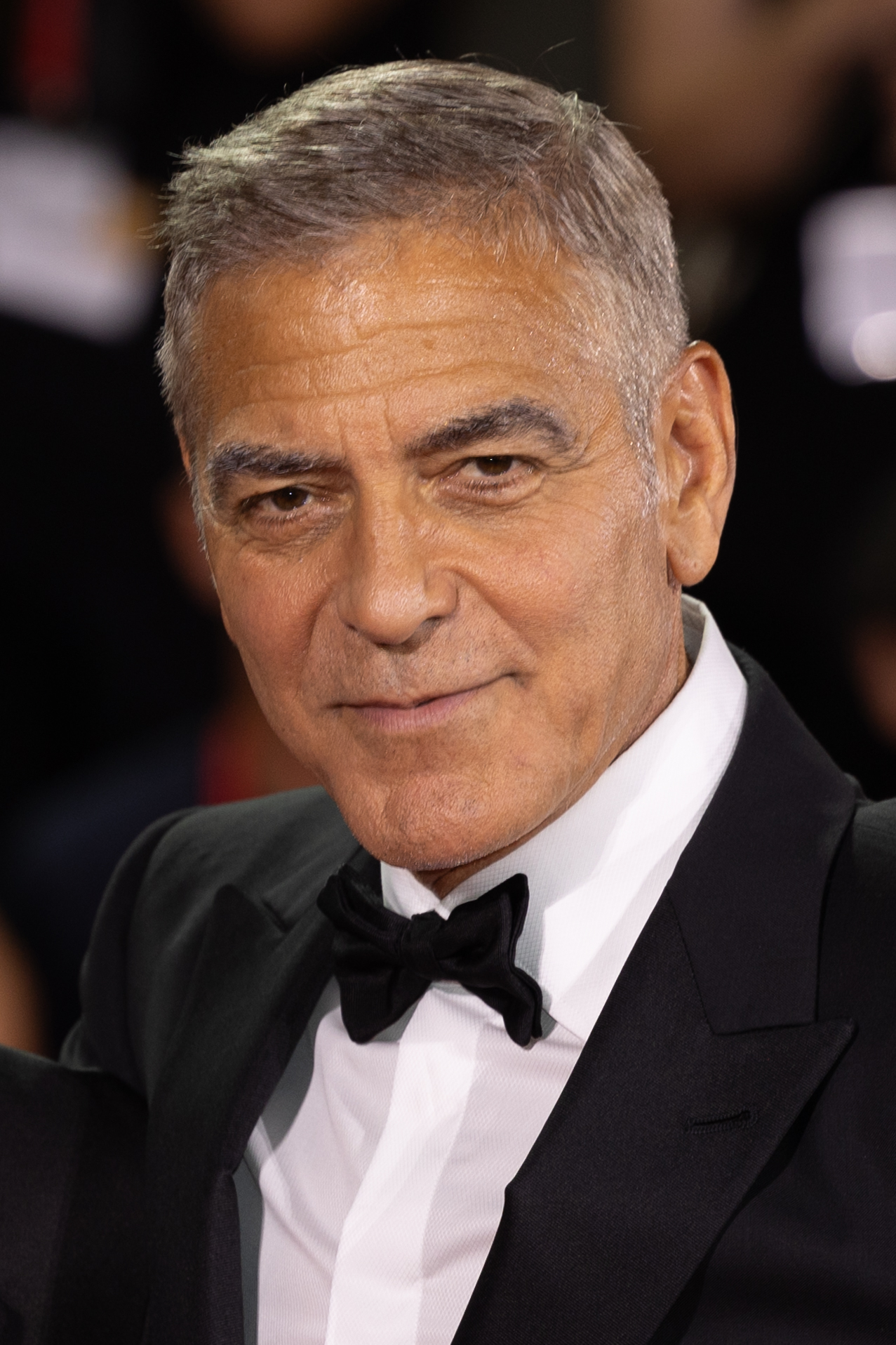
George Clooney won in 2017.

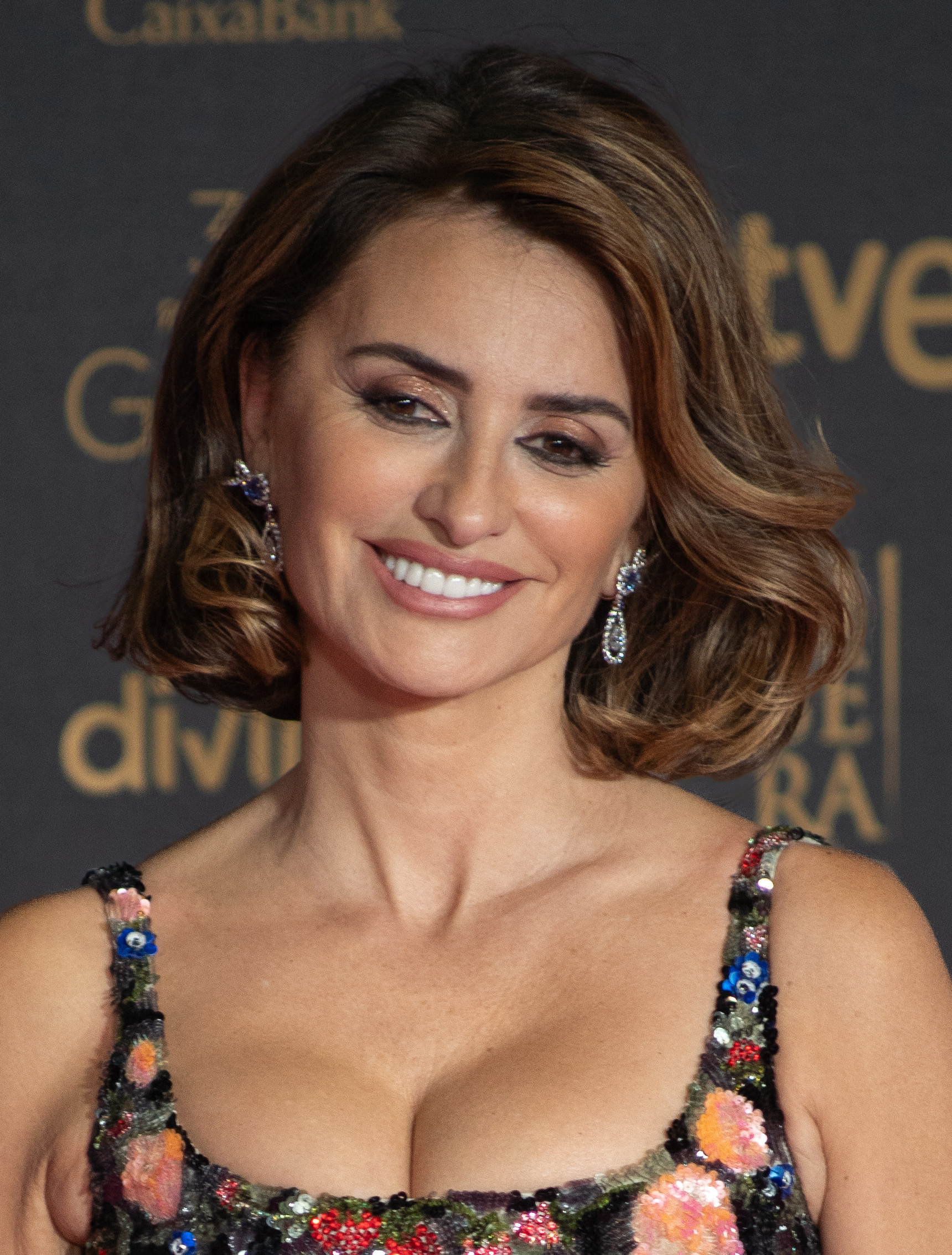
Penelope Cruz won in 2019.

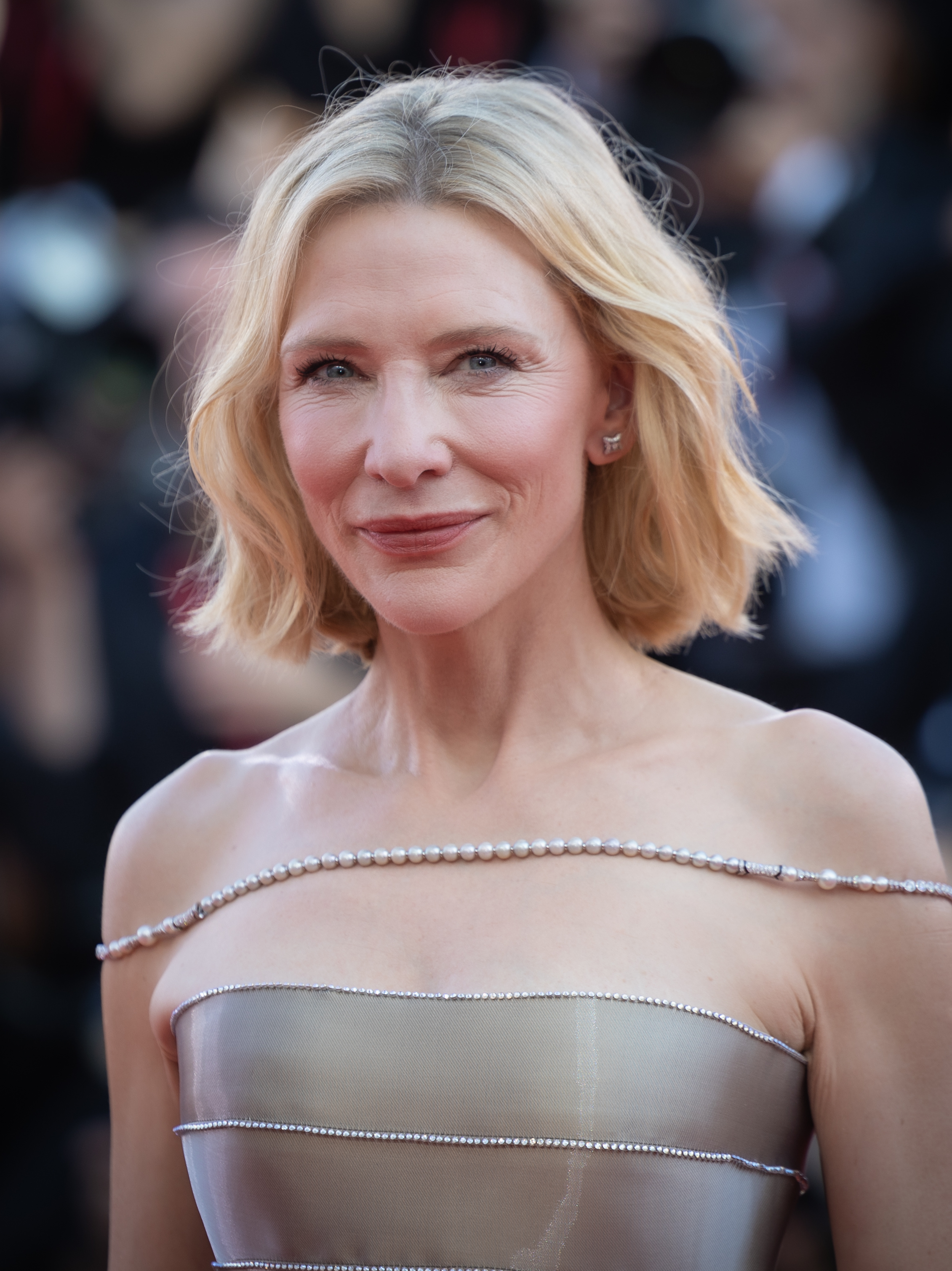
Cate Blanchett won in 2022.

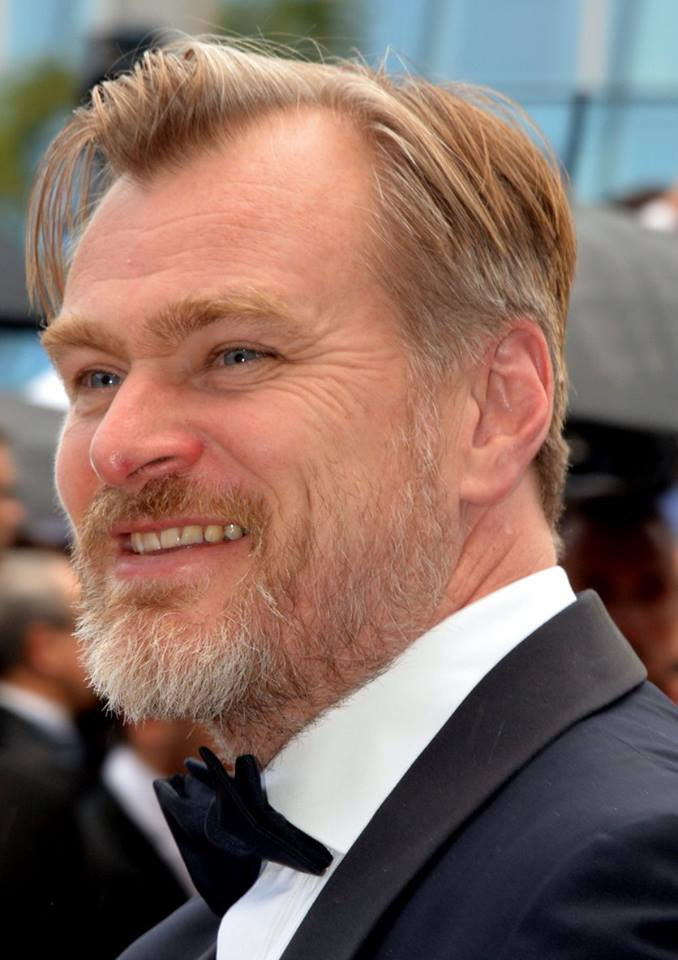
Christopher Nolan won in 2024.

=== 1970s ===
Year	Recipient	Profession	Nationality	Ref.
1976	Ingrid Bergman	Actress	Sweden	
1976	Diana Ross	Actress / singer	United States	
1977	Henri Langlois (posthumous)	Film archivist / co-founder of the Cinémathèque Française	France	
1977	Jacques Tati	Actor, director and screenwriter	France	
1978	Robert Dorfmann	Film producer	France	
1978	René Goscinny (posthumous)	Writer / director / producer / editor	France	
1979	Marcel Carné	Director / screenwriter	France	
1979	Charles Vanel	Actor / director / screenwriter	France	
1979	Walt Disney (posthumous)	Animator / director / producer	United States	

=== 1980s ===
Year	Recipient	Profession	Nationality	Ref.
1980	Pierre Braunberger	Producer / director / screenwriter	France	
1980	Louis de Funès	Actor / screenwriter / director	France	
1980	Kirk Douglas	Actor / director / producer	United States	
1981	Marcel Pagnol (posthumous)	Director / screenwriter	France	
1981	Alain Resnais	Director / editor / screenwriter	France	
1982	Georges Dancigers	Film producer	Russia / France	
1982	Alexandre Mnouchkine	Film producer	Russia / France	
1982	Jean Nény	Sound engineer	France	
1982	Andrzej Wajda	Director / screenwriter	Poland	
1983	Raimu (posthumous)	Actor	France	
1984	René Clément	Director / screenwriter	France	
1984	Georges de Beauregard	Film producer	France	
1984	Edwige Feuillère	Actress / screenwriter	France	
1985	Christian-Jaque	Director / screenwriter	France	
1985	Danielle Darrieux	Actress	France	
1985	Christine Gouze-Rénal	Producer / actress	France	
1985	Alain Poiré	Producer / screenwriter	France	
1986	Maurice Jarre	Composer	France	
1986	Bette Davis	Actress / producer	United States	
1986	Jean Delannoy	Director, screenwriter and producer	France	
1986	René Ferracci (posthumous)	Art director / poster designer	France	
1986	Claude Lanzmann	Director of the documentary feature Shoah	France	
1987	Jean-Luc Godard	Director / screenwriter	France / Switzerland	
1988	Serge Silberman	Producer / screenwriter	Russia / France	
1989	Bernard Blier	Actor	France	
1989	Paul Grimault	Director / screenwriter / actor	France	

=== 1990s ===
Year	Recipient	Profession	Nationality	Ref.
1990	Gérard Philipe (posthumous)	Actor	France	
1991	Jean-Pierre Aumont	Actor and screenwriter	France	
1991	Sophia Loren	Actress	Italy	
1992	Michèle Morgan	Actress	France	
1992	Sylvester Stallone	Actor / screenwriter / director	United States	
1993	Jean Marais	Actor	France	
1993	Marcello Mastroianni	Actor	Italy	
1993	Gérard Oury	Actor / screenwriter / director	France	
1994	Jean Carmet	Actor / screenwriter	France	
1995	Jeanne Moreau	Actress / screenwriter / director	France	
1995	Gregory Peck	Actor	United States	
1995	Steven Spielberg	Director / producer	United States	
1996	Lauren Bacall	Actress	United States	
1996	Henri Verneuil	Director / screenwriter / actor	France	
1997	Charles Aznavour	Actor / composer / singer / screenwriter	France / Armenia	
1997	Andie MacDowell	Actress	United States	
1998	Michael Douglas	Actor / producer	United States	
1998	Clint Eastwood	Actor / director / producer	United States	
1998	Jean-Luc Godard (Note: (for the second time))	Director / screenwriter	France / Switzerland	
1999	Pedro Almodóvar	Director / screenwriter / producer	Spain	
1999	Johnny Depp	Actor / producer	United States	
1999	Jean Rochefort	Actor	France	

=== 2000s ===
Year	Recipient	Profession	Nationality	Ref.
2000	Josiane Balasko	Actress / screenwriter / director	France	
2000	Georges Cravenne	Journalist / film producer / founder of the César Awards	France	
2000	Jean-Pierre Léaud	Actor	France	
2000	Martin Scorsese	Filmmaker	United States	
2001	Darry Cowl	Actor / composer / screenwriter / director	France	
2001	Charlotte Rampling	Actress	United Kingdom	
2001	Agnès Varda	Director / screenwriter	France	
2002	Anouk Aimée	Actress	France	
2002	Jeremy Irons	Actor	United Kingdom	
2002	Claude Rich	Actor / screenwriter	France	
2003	Bernadette Lafont	Actress / director	France	
2003	Spike Lee	Filmmaker	United States	
2003	Meryl Streep	Actress	United States	
2004	Micheline Presle	Actress	France	
2005	Jacques Dutronc	Actor / singer / composer	France	
2005	Will Smith	Actor	United States	
2006	Hugh Grant	Actor	United Kingdom	
2006	Pierre Richard	Actor	France	
2007	Marlène Jobert	Actress	France	
2007	Jude Law	Actor	United Kingdom	
2008	Jeanne Moreau (Note: (for the second time))	Actress	France	
2008	Roberto Benigni	Actor and director	Italy	
2008	Romy Schneider (posthumous)	Actress	Germany	
2009	Dustin Hoffman	Actor	United States	

=== 2010s ===
Year	Recipient	Profession	Nationality	Ref.
2010	Harrison Ford	Actor	United States	
2011	Quentin Tarantino	Director / screenwriter	United States	
2012	Kate Winslet	Actress	United Kingdom	
2013	Kevin Costner	Actor, director and producer	United States	
2014	Scarlett Johansson	Actress	United States	
2015	Sean Penn	Actor / Filmmaker	United States	
2016	Michael Douglas (Note: (for the second time))	Actor / producer	United States	
2017	George Clooney	Actor / Filmmaker	United States	
2018	Penélope Cruz	Actress	Spain	
2019	Robert Redford	Actor / director	United States	

=== 2020s ===
Year	Recipient	Profession	Nationality	Ref.
2022	Cate Blanchett	Actress / producer	Australia	
2023	David Fincher	Director / producer	United States	
2024	Agnès Jaoui	Actress / screenwriter / film director	France	
2024	Christopher Nolan	Director / screenwriter / producer	United Kingdom	
2025	Julia Roberts	Actress	United States	
2025	Costa Gavras	Film director / screenwriter / producer	Greece / France	
2026	Jim Carrey	Actor / comedian	Canada / United States	
2027	Nicole Kidman	Actress / producer	Australia / United States	
