= 2nd César Awards =

1977 French film awards ceremony

- Date: 19 February 1977
- Site: Salle Pleyel, Paris, France
- Hosted by: Pierre Tchernia

Highlights
- Best Film: Monsieur Klein
- Best Actor: Michel Galabru
- Best Actress: Annie Girardot

Television coverage
- Network: Antenne 2

The 2nd César Awards ceremony, presented by the Académie des Arts et Techniques du Cinéma, honoured the best French films of 1976 and took place on 19 February 1977 at Salle Pleyel in Paris. The ceremony was chaired by Lino Ventura and hosted by Pierre Tchernia for the second consecutive year. Monsieur Klein won the award for Best Film.

== Winners and nominees ==
The winners are highlighted in bold:

**Best Film** **Monsieur Klein**: Barocco; The Judge and the Assassin; La Meilleure façon de marcher	**Best Director** **Joseph Losey** – **Monsieur Klein**: André Téchiné – Barocco; Bertrand Tavernier – The Judge and the Assassin; Claude Miller – La Meilleure façon de marcher
**Best Actor** **Michel Galabru** – **Le Juge et l'Assassin**: Gérard Depardieu – La Dernière femme; Patrick Dewaere – La Meilleure façon de marcher; Alain Delon – Monsieur Klein	**Best Actress** **Annie Girardot** – **Docteur Françoise Gailland**: Isabelle Adjani – Barocco; Miou-Miou – F... comme Fairbanks; Romy Schneider – Une femme à sa fenêtre
**Best Actor in a Supporting Role** **Claude Brasseur** – **Un éléphant ça trompe énormément**: Jean-Claude Brialy – The Judge and the Assassin; Jacques Dutronc – Mado; Charles Denner – Second Chance	**Best Actress in a Supporting Role** **Marie-France Pisier** – **Barocco**: Brigitte Fossey – Le Bon et les méchants; Francine Racette – Lumière; Anny Duperey – Un éléphant ça trompe énormément
**Best Screenplay, Dialogue or Adaptation** **The Judge and the Assassin** – **Jean Aurenche** and **Bertrand Tavernier**: Le Jouet – Francis Veber; La Meilleure façon de marcher – Claude Miller and Luc Béraud; Un éléphant ça trompe énormément – Jean-Loup Dabadie	**Best Cinematography** **Bruno Nuytten** – **La Meilleure façon de marcher** and **Barocco**: Claude Renoir – Docteur Françoise Gailland and Une femme fidèle; Étienne Becker – Le Jouet; Gerry Fisher – Monsieur Klein
**Best Music** **Philippe Sarde** – **Barocco**: Georges Delerue – Le Grand escogriffe and Police Python 357; Serge Gainsbourg – Je t'aime moi non plus; Philippe Sarde – The Judge and the Assassin; Mort Shuman – À nous les petites Anglaises	**Best Production Design** **Alexandre Trauner** – **Monsieur Klein**: Ferdinando Scarfiotti – Barocco; Bernard Evein – Le Jouet; Pierre Guffroy – The Tenant and Mado
**Best Editing** **Marie-Josèphe Yoyotte** – **Police Python 357**: Claudine Merlin – Barocco; Henri Lanoë – Monsieur Klein; Jean Ravel – Une femme à sa fenêtre	**Best Sound** **Jean-Pierre Ruh** – **Mado**: Paul Lainé – Barocco and La Meilleure façon de marcher; Antoine Bonfanti – Je t'aime moi non plus; Jean Labussière – Monsieur Klein
**Best Foreign Film**: **C'eravamo tanto amati**; Barry Lyndon; Cría cuervos; One Flew Over the Cuckoo's Nest	**Best Animated Short Film** **Un comédien sans paradoxe**: Bactéries nos amies; Déjeuner du matin; L'Empreinte; Oiseau de nuit; La Rosette arrosée
**Best Fiction Short Film** **Comment ça va je m'en fous**: Chaleurs d'été; Le Destin de Jean-Noël; L'Enfant prisonnier; L'Hiver approche; La Nuit du beau marin peut-être	**Best Documentary Short Film** **Une histoire de ballon, lycée n°31 Pékin**: L'Atelier de Louis; L'Eruption de la montagne pelée; Hongrie vers quel socialisme?; Les Murs d'une révolution; Réponses des femmes
**Honorary César** **Jacques Tati**; **Henri Langlois**

== See also ==
- 49th Academy Awards
- 30th British Academy Film Awards
