= 47th César Awards =

Awards ceremony

- Official poster featuring Jean-Paul Belmondo and Anna Karina in Pierrot le Fou (1965)
- Date: 25 February 2022
- Site: Olympia, Paris
- Hosted by: Antoine de Caunes

Highlights
- Best Film: Lost Illusions
- Best Actor: Benoît Magimel; Peaceful
- Best Actress: Valérie Lemercier; Aline
- Most awards: Lost Illusions (7)
- Most nominations: Lost Illusions (15)

Television coverage
- Network: Canal+

The 47th César Awards ceremony, presented by the Académie des Arts et Techniques du Cinéma, took place on 25 February 2022 honouring the best French films of 2021. Screenwriter and director Danièle Thompson presided the ceremony that was hosted by Antoine de Caunes. Australian actress and producer Cate Blanchett received the Honorary César. The ceremony was dedicated to actor Gaspard Ulliel, who died on 19 January 2022. In September 2021, the governing association of the César Awards voted to create two new awards that were introduced in the 47th ceremony: Best Visual Effects and Best Documentary Short Film.

Drama film Lost Illusions led all nominees with 15 nominations, followed by Annette and Aline with eleven and ten nominations, respectively. Lost Illusions went on to win seven awards, more than any other film in the ceremony, including Best Film.

== Winners and nominees ==
The nominees for the 47th César Awards were announced on 26 January 2022. Winners are listed first and highlighted in boldface.

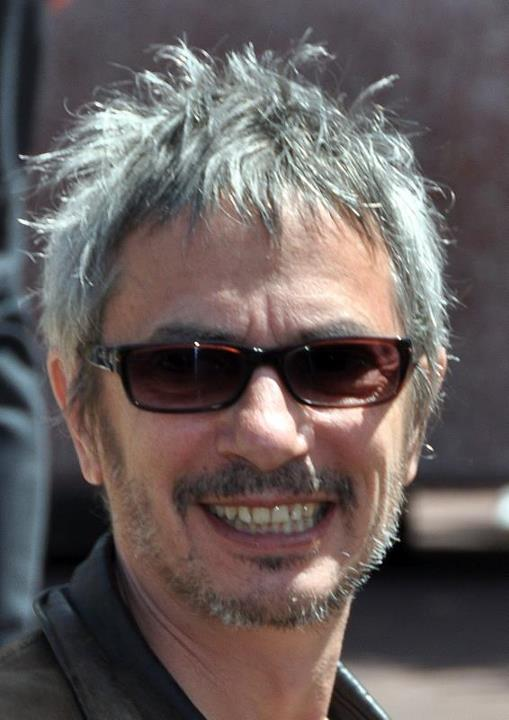
Leos Carax, Best Director winner.

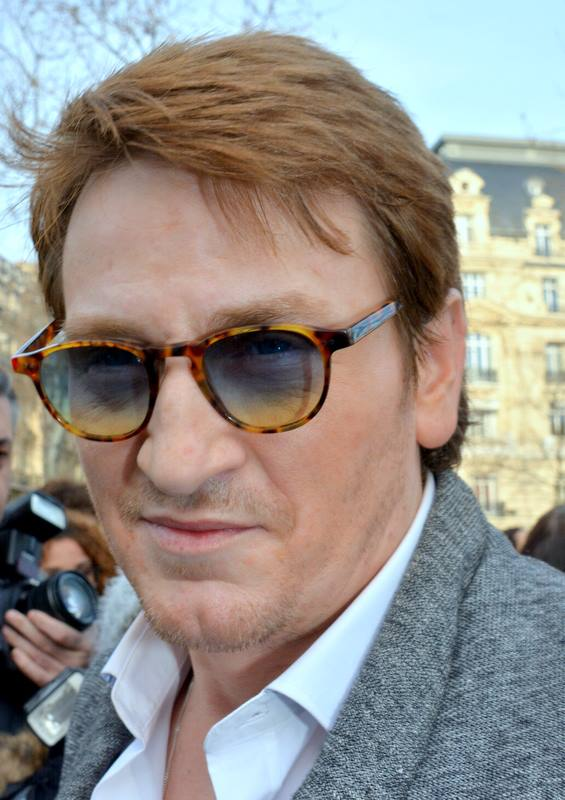
Benoît Magimel, Best Actor winner.

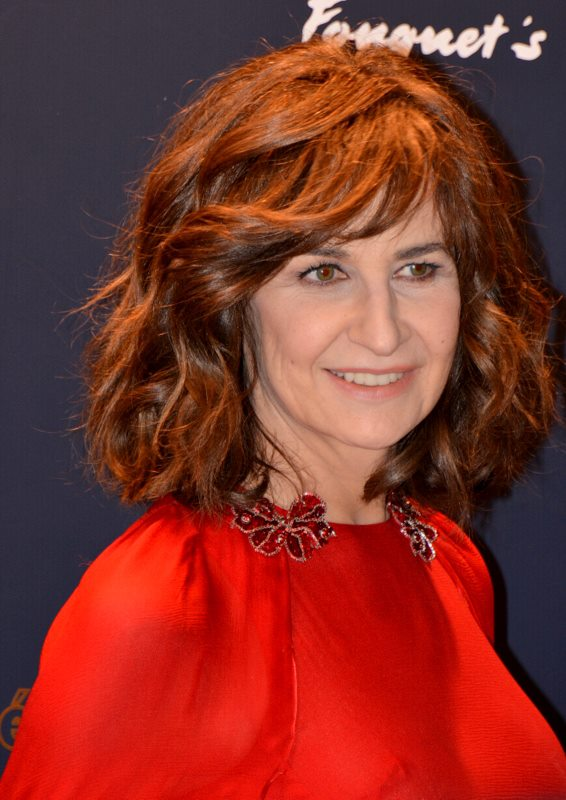
Valérie Lemercier, Best Actress winner.

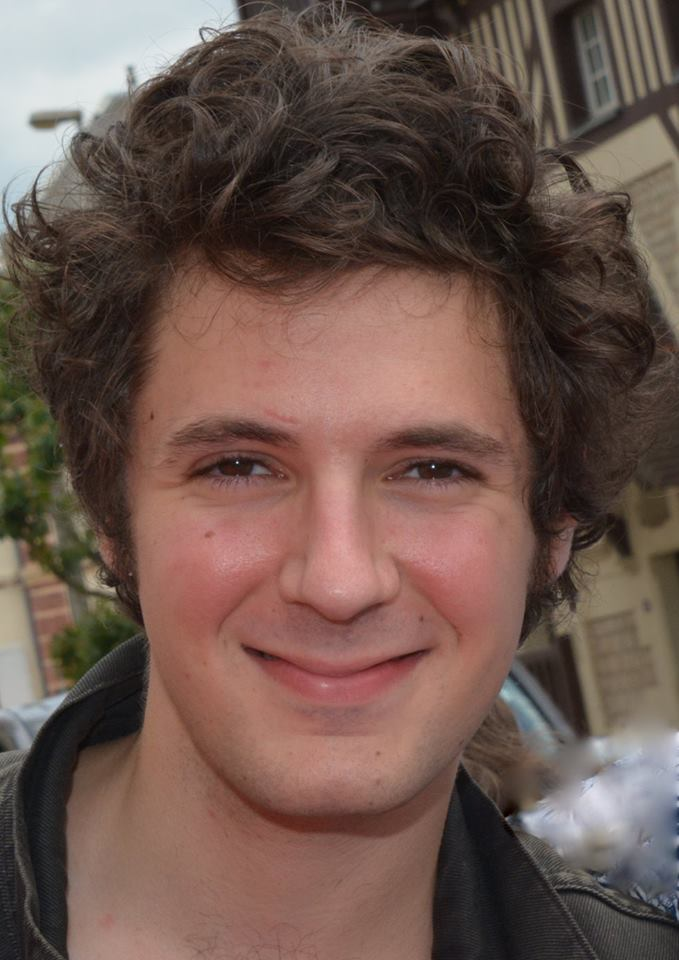
Vincent Lacoste, Best Supporting Actor winner.

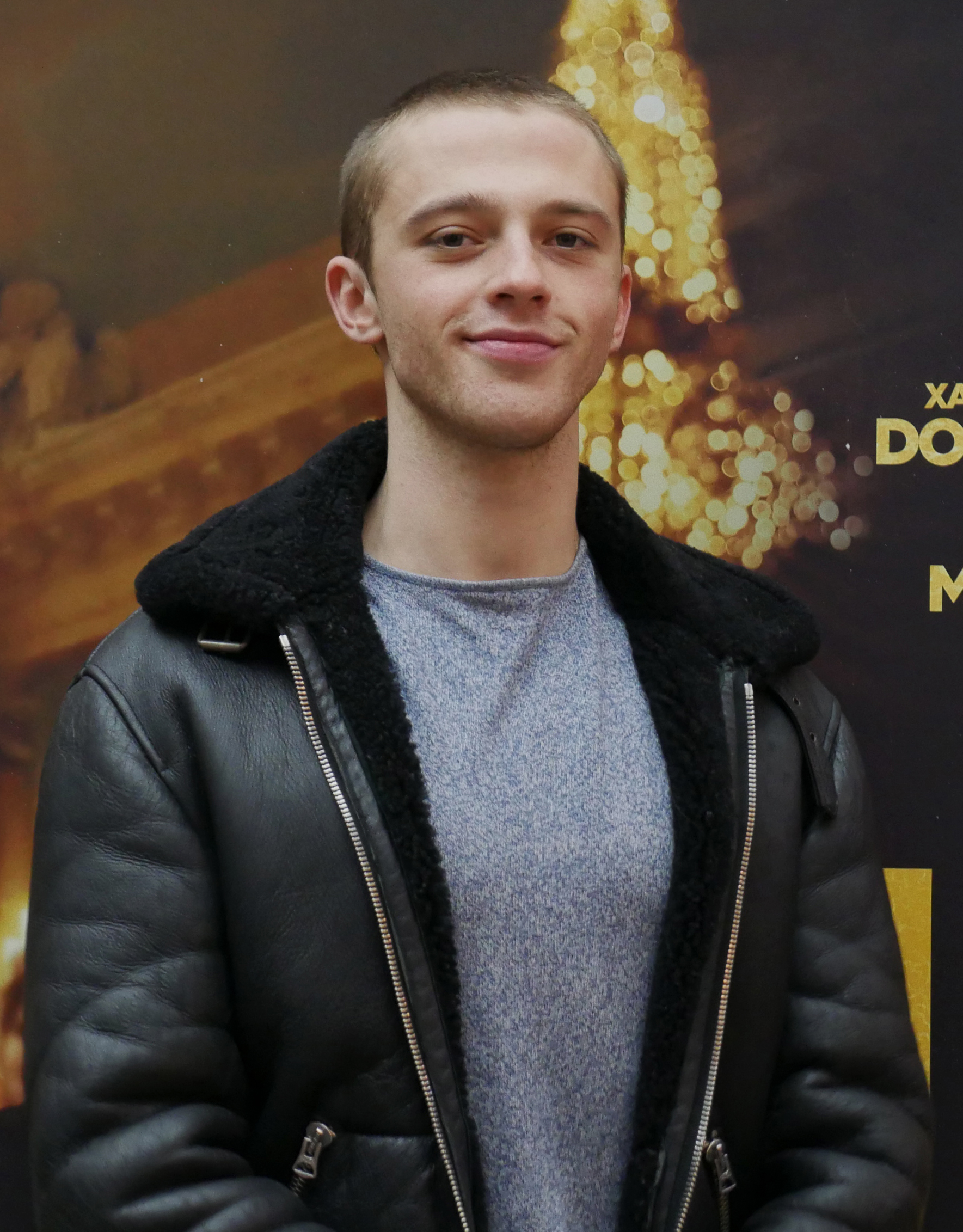
Benjamin Voisin, Most Promising Actor winner.

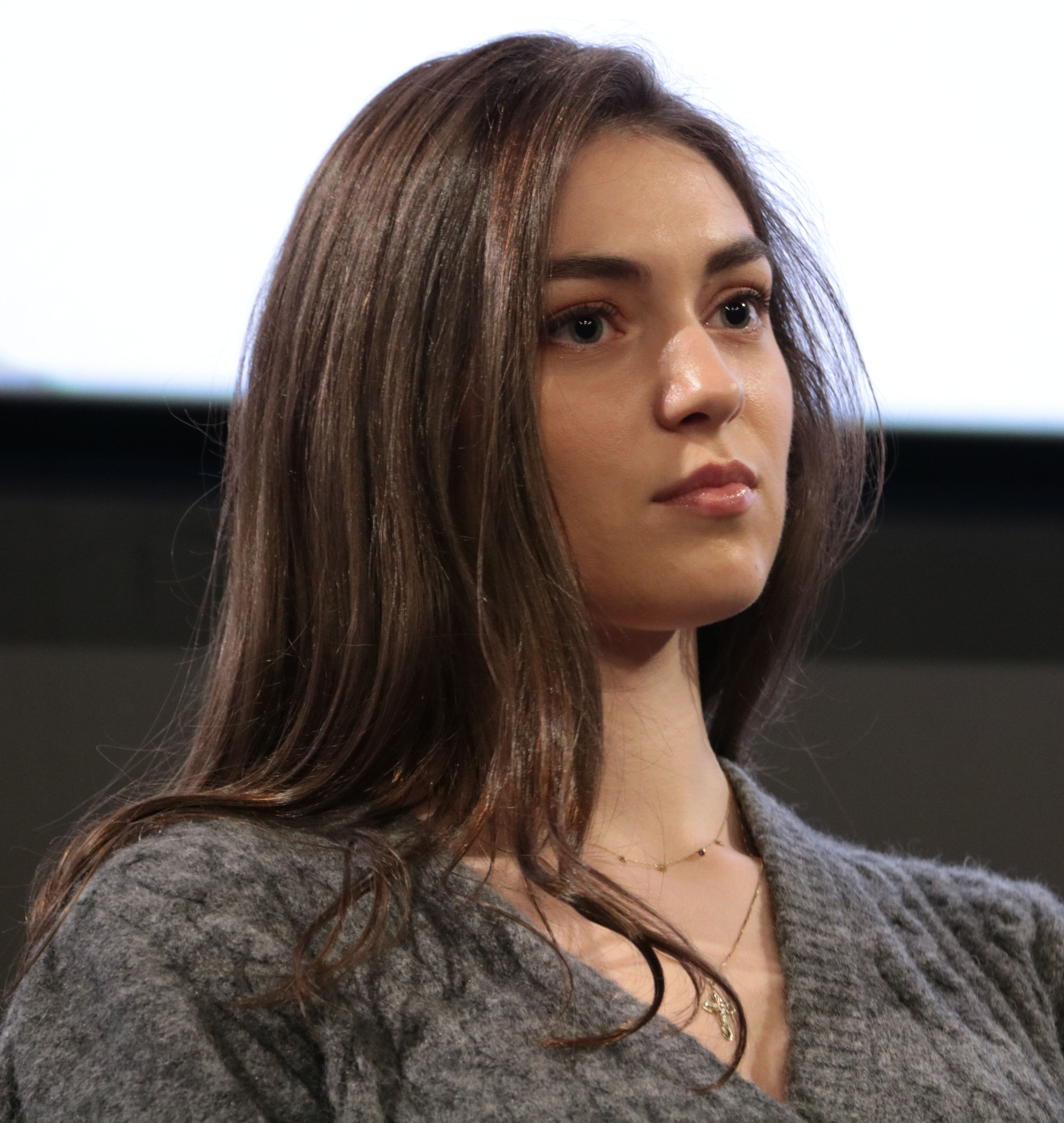
Anamaria Vartolomei, Most Promising Actress winner.

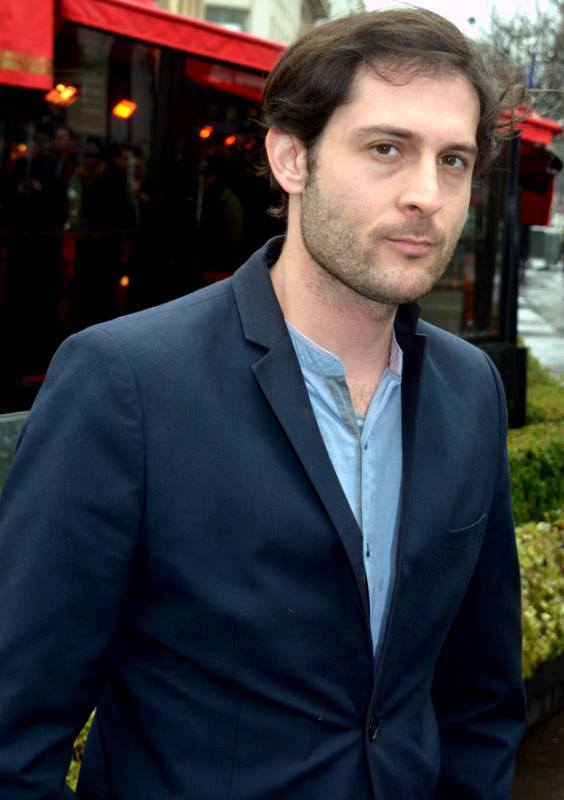
Arthur Harari, Best Original Screenplay co-winner.

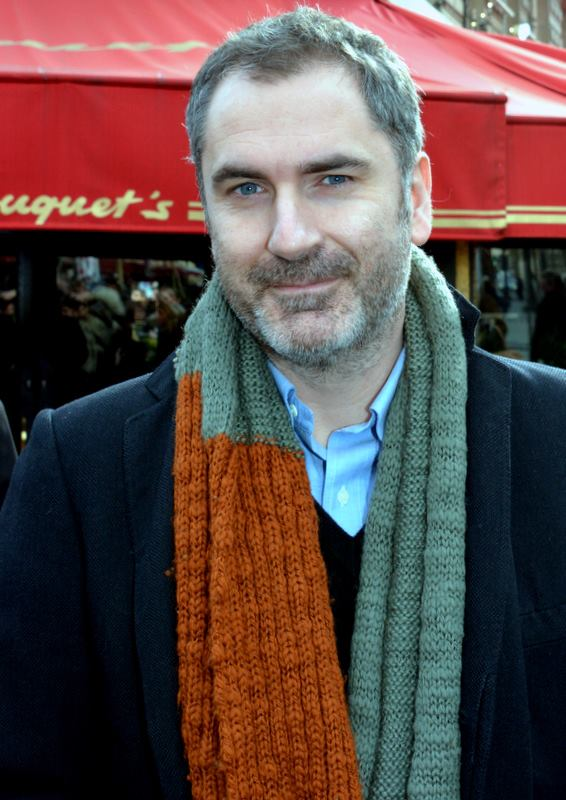
Xavier Giannoli, Best Adaptation co-winner.

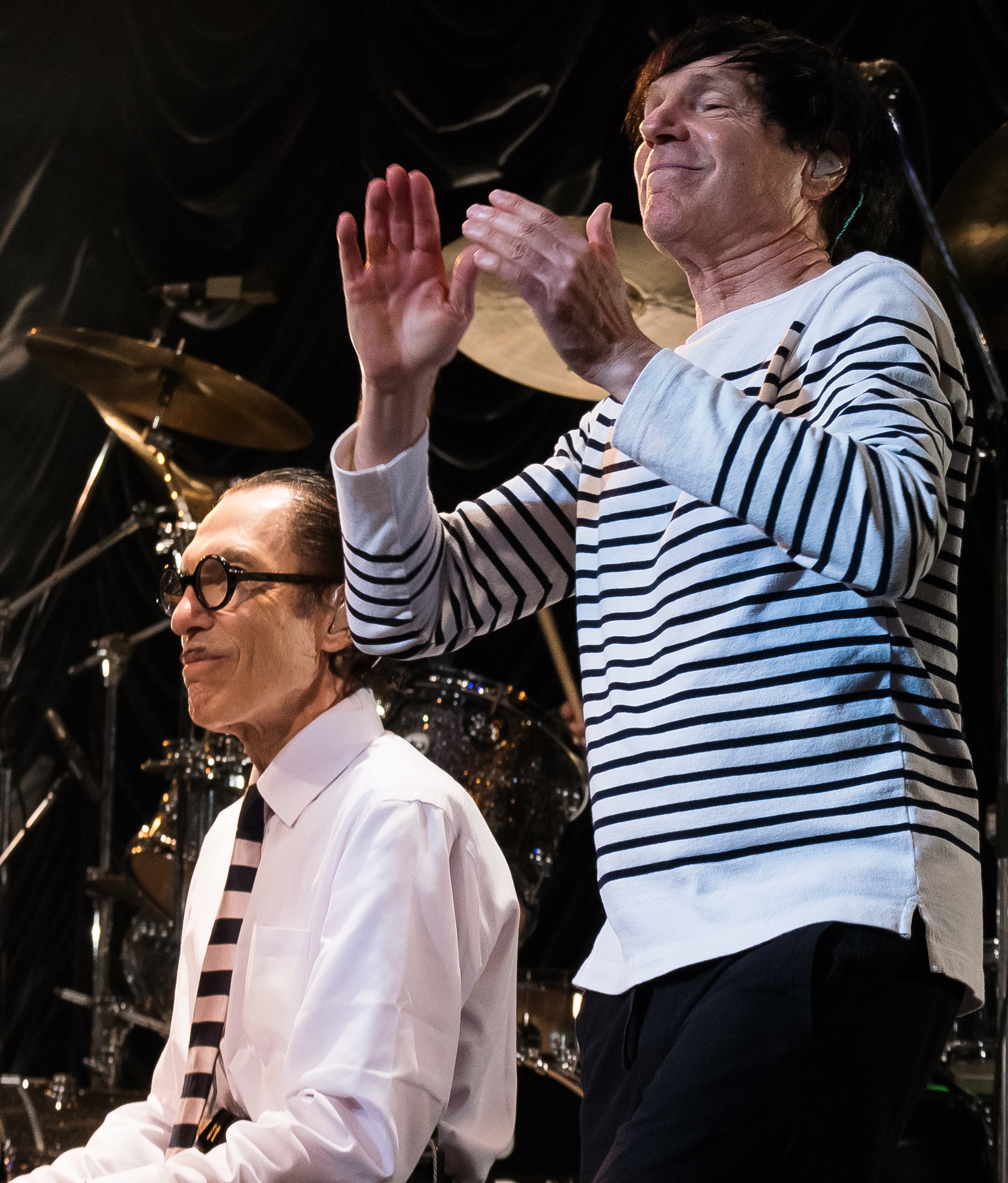
Ron Mael and Russell Mael, Best Original Music winners.

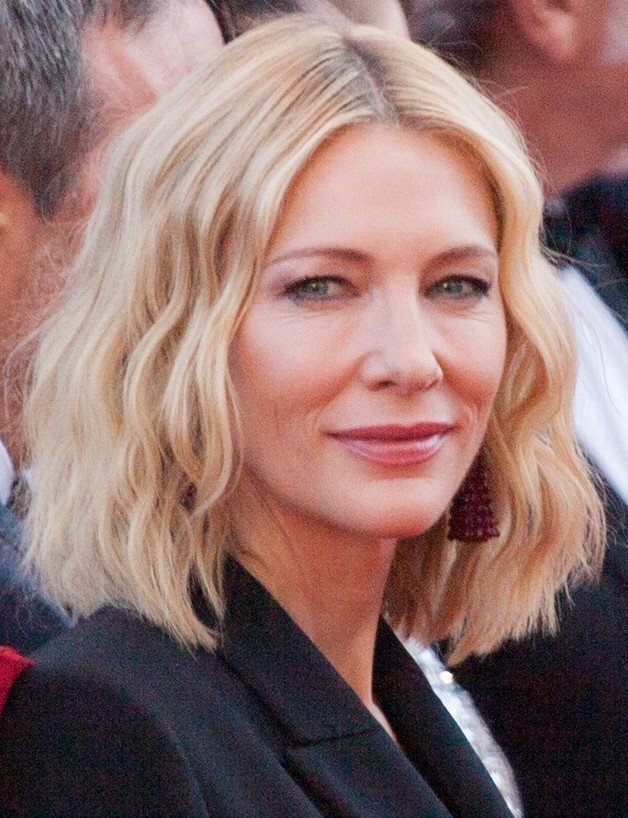
Cate Blanchett, Honorary César recipient.

**Best Film** **Lost Illusions – Produced by Olivier Delbosc and Sidonie Dumas; Directed by Xavier Giannoli**: Annette – Produced by Charles Gillibert and Paul-Dominique Win Vacharasinthu; Directed by Leos Carax; Aline – Produced by Edouard Weil, Alice Girard, and Sidonie Dumas; Directed by Valérie Lemercier; BAC Nord – Produced by Hugo Sélignac and Vincent Mazel; Directed by Cédric Jimenez; The Divide – Produced by Elisabeth Perez; Directed by Catherine Corsini; Happening – Produced by Edouard Weil and Alice Girard; Directed by Audrey Diwan; Onoda: 10,000 Nights in the Jungle – Produced by Nicolas Anthomé; Directed by Arthur Harari	**Best Director** **Leos Carax – Annette**: Audrey Diwan – Happening; Julia Ducournau – Titane; Xavier Giannoli – Lost Illusions; Arthur Harari – Onoda: 10,000 Nights in the Jungle; Cédric Jimenez – BAC Nord; Valérie Lemercier – Aline
**Best Actor** **Benoît Magimel – Peaceful as Benjamin**: Damien Bonnard – The Restless as Damien; Adam Driver – Annette as Henry McHenry; Gilles Lellouche – BAC Nord as Greg Cerva; Vincent Macaigne – The Night Doctor as Mikael; Pio Marmaï – The Divide as Yann; Pierre Niney – Black Box as Matthieu Vasseur	**Best Actress** **Valérie Lemercier – Aline as Aline Dieu**: Leïla Bekhti – The Restless as Leïla; Valeria Bruni Tedeschi – The Divide as Raf; Laure Calamy – Her Way as Marie; Virginie Efira – Benedetta as Benedetta Carlini; Vicky Krieps – Hold Me Tight as Clarisse; Léa Seydoux – France as France de Meurs
**Best Supporting Actor** **Vincent Lacoste – Lost Illusions as Etienne Lousteau**: François Civil – BAC Nord as Antoine; Xavier Dolan – Lost Illusions as Nathan d'Anastazio; Karim Leklou – BAC Nord as Yass; Sylvain Marcel – Aline as Guy-Claude Camard	**Best Supporting Actress** **Aïssatou Diallo Sagna – The Divide as Kim**: Jeanne Balibar – Lost Illusions as Marquise d'Espard; Cécile de France – Lost Illusions as Louise de Bargeton; Adèle Exarchopoulos – Mandibles as Agnès; Danielle Fichaud – Aline as Sylvette Dieu
**Most Promising Actor** **Benjamin Voisin – Lost Illusions as Lucien de Rubempré**: Sandor Funtek – Suprêmes as Kool Shen; Sami Outalbali – A Tale of Love and Desire as Ahmed; Thimotée Robart – Magnetic Beats as Philippe; Makita Samba – Paris, 13th District as Camille	**Most Promising Actress** **Anamaria Vartolomei – Happening as Anne Duchesne**: Noée Abita – Slalom as Lyz; Salomé Dewaels – Lost Illusions as Coralie; Agathe Rousselle – Titane as Alexia/Adrien; Lucie Zhang – Paris, 13th District as Émilie
**Best Original Screenplay** **Onoda: 10,000 Nights in the Jungle – Arthur Harari and Vincent Poymiro**: Aline – Valérie Lemercier and Brigitte Buc; Annette – Leos Carax, Ron Mael, and Russell Mael; Black Box – Yann Gozlan, Simon Moutaïrou, and Nicolas Bouvet-Levrard; The Divide – Catherine Corsini, Laurette Polmanss, and Agnès Feuvre	**Best Adaptation** **Lost Illusions – Xavier Giannoli and Jacques Fieschi; based on a serial novel Illusions perdues by Honoré de Balzac**: The Accusation – Yaël Langmann and Yvan Attal; based on the book of the same name by Karine Tuil; Happening – Audrey Diwan and Marcia Romano; based on the book of the same name by Annie Ernaux; Hold Me Tight – Mathieu Amalric; based on the play Je reviens de loin by Claudine Galea; Paris, 13th District – Jacques Audiard, Céline Sciamma, and Léa Mysius; based on the short comic stories "Amber Sweet", "Hawaiian Getaway" and "Killing and Dying" from the book of the latter's name by Adrian Tomine
**Best First Film** **Magnetic Beats – Vincent Maël Cardona**: Gagarine – Fanny Liatard and Jérémy Trouilh; Slalom – Charlène Favier; The Swarm – Just Philippot; The Velvet Queen – Marie Amiguet and Vincent Munier	**Best Cinematography** **Lost Illusions – Christophe Beaucarne**: Annette – Caroline Champetier; Onoda: 10,000 Nights in the Jungle – Tom Harar; Paris, 13th District – Paul Guilhaume; Titane – Ruben Impens
**Best Editing** **Annette – Nelly Quettier**: BAC Nord – Simon Jacquet; Black Box – Valentin Féron; The Divide – Frédéric Baillehaiche; Lost Illusions – Cyril Nakache	**Best Sound** **Annette – Erwan Kerzanet, Katia Boutin, Maxence Dussère, Paul Heymans, and Thomas Gauder**: Aline – Olivier Mauvezin, Arnaud Rolland, Edouard Morin, and Daniel Sobrino; Black Box – Nicolas Provost, Nicolas Bouvet-Levrard, and Marc Doisne; Lost Illusions – François Musy, Renaud Musy, and Didier Lozahic; Magnetic Beats – Mathieu Descamps, Pierre Bariaud, and Samuel Aïchoun
**Best Original Music** **Annette – Ron Mael and Russell Mael**: BAC Nord – Guillaume Roussel; Black Box – Philippe Rombi; Paris, 13th District – Rone; The Velvet Queen – Nick Cave and Warren Ellis	**Best Costume Design** **Lost Illusions – Pierre-Jean Laroque**: Aline – Catherine Leterrier; Annette – Pascaline Chavanne; Delicious – Madeline Fontaine; Eiffel – Thierry Delettre
**Best Production Design** **Lost Illusions – Riton Dupire-Clémént**: Aline – Emmanuelle Duplay; Annette – Florian Sanson; Delicious – Bertrand Seitz; Eiffel – Stéphane Taillasson	**Best Documentary Film** **The Velvet Queen – Marie Amiguet and Vincent Munier**: Animal – Cyril Dion; Bigger Than Us – Flore Vasseur; Gallant Indies – Philippe Béziat; Those Who Care – Gilles Perret and François Ruffin
**Best Animated Feature Film** **The Summit of the Gods – Patrick Imbert**: The Crossing (La Traversée) – Florence Miailhe; Even Mice Belong in Heaven – Denisa Grimmová and Jan Bubeníček	**Best Animated Short Film** **Mild Madness, Lasting Lunacy – Marine Laclotte**: Empty Places – Geoffroy De Crécy; The World Within – Sandrine Stoïanov and Jean-Charles Finck; Precious – Paul Mas
**Best Fiction Short Film** **One and Thousand Nights – Elie Girard**: Black Soldier – Jimmy Laporal-Trésor; Decent People – Maxime Roy; The Departure – Saïd Hamich Benlarbi; Tender Age – Julien Gaspar-Oliveri	**Best Documentary Short Film** **Maalbeek – Ismaël Joffroy Chandoutis**: America – Giacomo Abbruzzese; Antelopes – Maxime Martinot; La fin des rois – Rémi Brachet
**Best Foreign Film** **The Father (United Kingdom/France) – Directed by Florian Zeller**: Compartment No. 6 (Finland/Estonia/Germany/Russia) – Directed by Juho Kuosmanen; Drive My Car (Japan) – Directed by Ryusuke Hamaguchi; First Cow (United States) – Directed by Kelly Reichardt; Just 6.5 (Iran) – Directed by Saeed Roustayi; Parallel Mothers (Spain) – Directed by Pedro Almodóvar; The Worst Person in the World (Norway/France/Denmark/Sweden) – Directed by Joachim Trier	**Best Visual Effects** **Annette – Guillaume Pondard**: Aline – Sébastien Rame; Eiffel – Olivier Cauwet; Lost Illusions – Arnaud Fouquet and Julien Meesters; Titane – Martial Vallanchon
**Honorary César**: **Cate Blanchett**

=== Films with multiple nominations ===
The following films received multiple nominations:

Nominations	Films
15	Lost Illusions
11	Annette
10	Aline
7	BAC Nord
6	The Divide
5	Black Box
5	Paris, 13th District
4	Happening
4	Onoda: 10,000 Nights in the Jungle
4	Titane
3	Eiffel
3	Magnetic Beats
3	The Velvet Queen
2	Delicious
2	Hold Me Tight
2	The Restless
2	Slalom

=== Films with multiple wins ===
The following films received multiple wins:

Wins	Films
7	Lost Illusions
5	Annette

== See also ==
- 94th Academy Awards
- 75th British Academy Film Awards
- 67th David di Donatello
- 34th European Film Awards
- 79th Golden Globe Awards
- 36th Goya Awards
- 27th Lumière Awards
- 11th Magritte Awards
