= César Award for Best Visual Effects =

French film award

- Country: France
- Presented by: Académie des Arts et Techniques du Cinéma
- First award: 2022
- Currently held by: Lise Fischer for The Great Arch (2026)
- Website: academie-cinema.org

The César Award for Best Visual Effects (French: César des meilleurs effets visuels) is an award presented annually by the Académie des Arts et Techniques du Cinéma since 2022.

== Background ==
In September 2021, the governing association of the César Awards voted to create two new awards for Best Visual Effects and Best Documentary Short Film, both of which were introduced in the 47th ceremony. The visual effects category was established with the desire to "salute the excellence of French creativity through the work of a film's visual effects supervisors."

== Winners and nominees ==
=== 2020s ===
Year	English title	Original title	Visual effects supervisor(s)
2022 (47th)	Annette		Guillaume Pondard
2022 (47th)	Aline		Sébastien Rame
2022 (47th)	Eiffel		Olivier Cauwet
2022 (47th)	Lost Illusions	Illusions perdues	Arnaud Fouquet and Julien Meesters
2022 (47th)	Titane		Martial Vallanchon
2023 (48th)	Notre-Dame on Fire	Notre-Dame brûle	Laurens Ehrmann
2023 (48th)	The Five Devils	Les Cinq Diables	Guillaume Marien
2023 (48th)	Smoking Causes Coughing	Fumer fait tousser	Sébastien Rame
2023 (48th)	November	Novembre	Mikaël Tanguy
2023 (48th)	Pacifiction	Pacifiction – Tourment sur les îles	Marco Del Bianco
2024 (49th)	The Animal Kingdom	Le Règne animal	Cyrille Bonjean, Bruno Sommier and Jean-Louis Autret
2024 (49th)	Acid	Acide	Thomas Duval
2024 (49th)	The Mountain	La Montagne	Lise Fischer and Cédric Fayolle
2024 (49th)	The Three Musketeers: D'Artagnan and The Three Musketeers: Milady	Les Trois Mousquetaires: D'Artagnan and Les Trois Mousquetaires: Milady	Olivier Cauwet
2024 (49th)	Infested	Vermines	Léo Ewald
2025 (50th)	Emilia Pérez		Cédric Fayolle
2025 (50th)	The Beast	La Bête	Cédric Fayolle, Hugues Namur and Émilien Lazaron
2025 (50th)	The Count of Monte Cristo	Le Comte de Monte-Cristo	Olivier Cauwet
2025 (50th)	Monsieur Aznavour		Stéphane Dittoo
2026 (51st)	The Great Arch	L'Inconnu de la Grande Arche	Lise Fischer
2026 (51st)	Dog 51	Chien 51	Cédric Fayolle
2026 (51st)	Nouvelle Vague		Alain Carsoux
2026 (51st)	The Shrinking Man	L'homme qui rétrécit	Rodolphe Chabrier and Benoit de Longlée

== See also ==
- Academy Award for Best Visual Effects
- BAFTA Award for Best Special Visual Effects
