= Aline (film) =

2021 film by Valérie Lemercier

- French theatrical release poster
- Directed by: Valérie Lemercier
- Written by: Brigitte Buc; Valérie Lemercier
- Produced by: Sidonie Dumas; Alice Girard; Édouard Weil
- Starring: Valérie Lemercier; Sylvain Marcel; Danielle Fichaud; Roc Lafortune
- Cinematography: Laurent Dailland
- Edited by: Jean-François Elie
- Production companies: Rectangle Productions; Gaumont; TF1 Films Production; De L'Huile; Caramel Film; Belga Productions
- Distributed by: Gaumont (France); Maison 4:3 (Canada)
- Release dates: 13 July 2021 (Cannes); 10 November 2021 (France); 26 November 2021 (Canada)
- Running time: 128 minutes
- Countries: France; Canada
- Languages: French; English
- Budget: €23.6 million; (≈ $25.3 million)
- Box office: $11.1 million

Aline (French pronunciation: [alin]) is a 2021 French-Canadian musical comedy-drama film co-written, directed by and starring Valérie Lemercier. A fictionalized portrayal of the life of Céline Dion, Lemercier plays "Aline Dieu", a Canadian singer who rises to international superstardom.

Lemercier plays Aline at every stage of her life from childhood through to middle age, with her body and face digitally adjusted for age-appropriateness in post-production. However, her singing is performed by French singer Victoria Sio.

Aline had its world premiere on 13 July 2021 at the Cannes Film Festival, and was released in France on 10 November 2021 by Gaumont, and in Canada on 26 November 2021 by Maison 4:3. It received mixed reviews from the critics and earned four nominations at the 47th Annual César Awards, including Best Film, and with Lemercier winning for Best Actress.

== Plot ==
In Quebec, Canada, Anglomard and Sylvette Dieu are working-class parents raising 13 children in their small household. Aline, named after a song from Christophe, becomes the 14th and youngest child to be born in the family.

The Dieu family share a love of performing music that influences a young but timid Aline, as she sings ‘Mamy Blue’ at a family wedding for the first time. Aline tells her mother that she dreams of becoming a professional singer, which comes true as Sylvette composes her daughter's first song with the help of her eldest son. The demo tape was then sent to Guy-Claude Kamar, a record manager who managed one of the family's favorite singers; however, they have not heard back from him for two weeks. Guy-Claude finally listens to the demo and asks to meet Aline and her family. Amazed by Aline's singing voice, Guy-Claude is determined to make her one of the biggest artists in the world.

Aline releases her first few albums and hit songs, earning her immediate success in her home province and France. As Aline becomes a young adult, she is forced to take a long break in order for her image and music to mature. Aline grows romantic feelings for Guy-Claude as she resumes touring. Sylvette discovers this, but is not pleased due to their large age gap and confronts Guy-Claude, who is unaware of Aline's feelings, about it by threatening to fire him if he pursues. After winning a European song contest in Dublin, Aline expresses her feelings to Guy-Claude and the two pursue a private romantic relationship. Their relationship is met with anger by Sylvette, only for her to come to terms with it.

Aline performs ‘Pour que tu m'aimes encore’ at a talk show where she gets asked by the host regarding who the song was about, but tearfully decides not to say anything. Guy-Claude proposes to Aline while on tour in Italy and later marry with the Dieu family by their side. While the newlyweds try for a baby through IVF, Aline injures her voice while performing ‘All by Myself’ and is forced to not sing or speak for about three months. Aline receives a demo of ‘My Heart Will Go On’ and, although not originally amused, decides to record the song after Guy-Claude convinces her. Aline then meets and bonds with Fred, a French stylist, and decides to have him work for her after a successful performance at a movie awards show. After a series of failed IVF treatments, Aline gives birth to her first son, Junior, and then twin boys years later. Aline becomes an international superstar, but continues to receive jokes from the media regarding her marriage to Guy-Claude and grows tired of touring as she desires to be home with her family.

Guy-Claude dies after battling with terminal illness. Aline has been coping with her grief ever since, which escalates to her walking around Las Vegas alone while unrecognized. Fred begins to worry about her whereabouts as she is due to perform at a casino hotel that same night. Aline eventually makes it and performs ‘Ordinaire’.

== Cast ==
- Valérie Lemercier as Aline Dieu (based on Céline Dion)
  - Victoria Sio as Aline's singing voice
- Sylvain Marcel as Guy-Claude Kamar (based on René Angélil)
- Danielle Fichaud as Sylvette Dieu (based on Thérèse Dion)
- Roc Lafortune as Anglomard Dieu (based on Adhémar Dion)
- Antoine Vézina as Jean-Bobin Dieu
- Pascale Desrochers as Pascale Dieu
- Jean-Noël Brouté as Fred
- Sonia Vachon as Martine Lévêque
- Alain Zouvi as Docteur Lablanchette
- Yves Jacques as TV presenter

== Release ==
The film premiered at the 2021 Cannes Film Festival, and had its Canadian premiere in November 2021.

In advance of its Canadian release, the Dion family spoke out against the film, criticizing it for factual inaccuracies and for portraying their family as "a gang of Bougons". The film was approved by Dion's manager; Dion herself has not spoken about it publicly to date, although Lemercier has claimed that Dion's son René-Charles reached out to her to request a private viewing.

== Reception ==
=== Box office ===
Aline grossed $667,308 in the United States and Canada and $10.5 million in other territories for a worldwide total of $11.2 million, against a production budget of about $25.3 million.

=== Critical response ===
On the review aggregator website Rotten Tomatoes, 58% of 78 critics' reviews are positive, with an average rating of 5.50/10. The website's consensus reads: "An unforgettable blend of the conventional and the singularly strange, Aline is definitely odd, but it's also oddly entertaining." On Metacritic, the film has a weighted average score of 53 out of 100, based on 24 critics, indicating "mixed or average reviews". On AlloCiné, the film holds an average rating of 4.1/5 based on 35 press reviews.

Kyle Buchanan of The New York Times opined that Lemercier's decision to play the character throughout her life was the strangest aspect of the film:

"Shrunk to Hobbit size and Facetuned into near-oblivion, Lemercier scampers, preens and unnerves. I’ve never seen anything quite like it: Not PEN15, not John C. Reilly at the beginning of Walk Hard, not even a fully grown Martin Short playing a psychotic 10-year-old in Clifford. [. . .] Have you seen those Twitter prompts that ask you to reimagine a classic film with one character replaced by a Muppet? Aline reminded me of that, except the main character is the Muppet and instead of felt, she is made from your nightmares."

— Kyle Buchanan

For Variety, Peter Debruge wrote that "Lemercier wouldn’t dare offend Dion, nor would she dream of giving fans the slightest reason to question their devotion, and so 'Aline' comes off feeling like a faith-based movie, where Dieu (French for 'God') gets the reverential 'lives of the saints' treatment. For those who adjust their expectations accordingly, it’s still an extremely satisfying watch — just one in which the only conflicts are convincing Aline’s parents to accept her love for manager Guy-Claude (Sylvain Marcel), the couple attempting to get pregnant and a tricky period when Aline’s vocal cords nearly give out. Suffice to say, most of the film’s tears are those of joy."

=== Accolades ===
Award	Date of ceremony	Category	Recipient(s)	Result	Ref(s)
César Awards	February 25, 2022	Best Film	Edouard Weil, Alice Girard, Sidonie Dumas	Nominated	
César Awards	February 25, 2022	Best Director	Valérie Lemercier	Nominated	
César Awards	February 25, 2022	Best Actress	Valérie Lemercier	Won	
César Awards	February 25, 2022	Best Supporting Actor	Sylvain Marcel	Nominated	
César Awards	February 25, 2022	Best Supporting Actress	Danielle Fichaud	Nominated	
César Awards	February 25, 2022	Best Original Screenplay	Valérie Lemercier, Brigitte Buc	Nominated	
César Awards	February 25, 2022	Best Sound	Olivier Mauvezin, Arnaud Rolland, Edouard Morin, Daniel Sobrino	Nominated	
César Awards	February 25, 2022	Best Costume Design	Catherine Leterrier	Nominated	
César Awards	February 25, 2022	Best Production Design	Emmanuelle Duplay	Nominated	
César Awards	February 25, 2022	Best Visual Effects	Sébastien Rame	Nominated	
Prix Iris	June 5, 2022	Best Actor	Sylvain Marcel	Nominated	
Prix Iris	June 5, 2022	Best Actress	Danielle Fichaud	Nominated	
Prix Iris	June 5, 2022	Best Costume Design	Ginette Magny, Camille Janbon, Catherine Leterrier	Nominated	
Prix Iris	June 5, 2022	Best Hairstyling	Lyne Lapiana, Sandrine Masson, Silvine Picard, Rémy Pilot	Nominated	
Prix Iris	June 5, 2022	Best Makeup	Kathy Kelso, Marie Lastennet, Sarah Mescoff	Nominated	
Prix Iris	June 5, 2022	Best Casting	Nathalie Boutrie	Nominated	
Prix Iris	June 5, 2022	Public Prize	Nominations were revoked from these two categories as the film is a majority French production	Nominated	
Prix Iris	June 5, 2022	Most Successful Film Outside Quebec	Nominations were revoked from these two categories as the film is a majority French production	Nominated	
