= César Award for Best Documentary Short Film =

French film award

- Country: France
- Presented by: Académie des Arts et Techniques du Cinéma
- First award: 1977
- Currently held by: Au Bain des Dames (2026)
- Website: academie-cinema.org

The César Award for Best Documentary Short Film (French: César du meilleur court métrage documentaire) is an award presented annually by the Académie des Arts et Techniques du Cinéma from 1977 to 1991 and again since 2022.

== Background ==
The César Award for Best Documentary Short Film was first awarded in 1977 and presented annually until 1991. It was replaced by the integrated César Award for Best Short Film (1992–2021).

In September 2021, the governing association of the César Awards voted to create two new awards for Best Visual Effects and Best Documentary Short Film, both of which were introduced in the 47th ceremony (2022). The documentary short category was established with the desire to "reveal emerging documentary filmmakers."

== Winners and nominees ==
=== 1970s ===
Year	English title	Original title	Director(s)
1977 (2nd)	The Football Incident	Une histoire de ballon - lycée n° 31 - Pékin	Marceline Loridan and Joris Ivens
1977 (2nd)	L'Atelier de Louis		Didier Pourcel
1977 (2nd)	L'Éruption de la Montagne Pelée		Manuel Otéro
1977 (2nd)	Hongrie vers quel socialisme?		Claude Weisz
1977 (2nd)	Les Murs d'une révolution		Jean-Paul Dekiss
1977 (2nd)	Women Reply	Réponses de femmes	Agnès Varda
1978 (3rd)	Le Maréchal-ferrant		Georges Rouquier
1978 (3rd)	Benchavis		Jean-Daniel Simon
1978 (3rd)	La Loterie de la vie		Guy Gilles
1978 (3rd)	Naissance		Frédéric Le Boyer
1978 (3rd)	Samara		Rafi Toumayan
1979 (4th)	L'Arbre vieux		Henri Moline
1979 (4th)	Chaotilop		Jean-Louis Gros
1979 (4th)	Tibesti too		Raymond Depardon

=== 1980s ===
Year	English title	Original title	Director(s)
1980 (5th)	Petit Pierre		Emmanuel Clot
1980 (5th)	Georges Demenÿ		Joël Farges
1980 (5th)	Panoplie		Philippe Gaucherand
1980 (5th)	Le Sculpteur parfait		Rafi Toumayan
1981 (6th)	Le Miroir de la terre		Daniel Absil and Paul de Roubaix
1981 (6th)	Abel Gance, une mémoire de l'avenir		Laurent Drancourt and Thierry Filliard
1981 (6th)	Insomnies		Peter Schamoni
1982 (7th)	Reporters		Raymond Depardon
1982 (7th)	Ci-gisent		Valérie Moncorge
1982 (7th)	Solange Giraud née Tache		Simone Bitton
1983 (8th)	Junkopia		Chris Marker
1983 (8th)	L'Ange de l'abîme		Annie Tresgot
1983 (8th)	Los Montes		José Martin Sarmiento
1983 (8th)	Sculptures sonores		Jacques Barsac
1984 (9th)	Ulysse		Agnès Varda
1984 (9th)	Je sais que j'ai tort, mais demandez à mes copains, ils vous diront la même chose		Pierre Lévy
1984 (9th)	La Vie au bout des doigts		Jean-Paul Janssen
1985 (10th)	La Nuit du hibou		François Dupeyron
1985 (10th)	L'Écuelle et l'assiette		Raoul Rossi
1985 (10th)	Hommage à Dürer		Gérard Samson
1986 (11th)	New York N.Y.		Raymond Depardon
1986 (11th)	La Boucane		Jean Gaumy
1986 (11th)	C'était la dernière année de ma vie		Claude Weisz
1986 (11th)	Un petit prince		Radovan Tadic
1987 (12th)	No award given.		
1988 (13th)	L'Été perdu		Dominique Théron
1988 (13th)	Pour une poignée de kurus		Gilbert Augerau and Christian Raimbaud
1989 (14th)	Chet's romance		Bertrand Fèvre
1989 (14th)	Classified people		Yolande Zauberman
1989 (14th)	Devant le mur		Daisy Lamothe

=== 1990s ===
Year	English title	Original title	Director(s)
1990 (15th)	Chanson pour un marin		Bernard Aubouy
1990 (15th)	Le Faucon de Notre-Dame		Claude-Christine Farny
1991 (16th)	La Valise		François Amado
1991 (16th)	Tai Ti Chan		Chi Yan Wong

=== 2020s ===
Year	English title	Original title	Director(s)
2022 (47th)	Maalbeek		Ismaël Joffroy Chandoutis
2022 (47th)	America		Giacomo Abbruzzese
2022 (47th)	Antelopes	Les Antilopes	Maxime Martinot
2022 (47th)	The End of Kings	La Fin des rois	Rémi Brachet
2023 (48th)	Maria Schneider, 1983		Elisabeth Subrin
2023 (48th)	Churchill, Polar Bear Town		Annabelle Amoros
2023 (48th)	Listen to the Beat of Our Images	Écoutez le battement de nos images	Audrey Jean-Baptiste and Maxime Jean-Baptiste
2024 (49th)	The Mechanics of Fluids	La Mécanique des fluides	Gala Hernández López
2024 (49th)	L'Acteur, ou la surprenante vertu de l'incompréhension		Hugo David and Raphaël Quenard
2024 (49th)	How I Got My Wrinkles	L'Effet de mes rides	Claude Delafosse
2025 (50th)	Les Fiancées du Sud		Elena López Riera
2025 (50th)	Little Spartacus	Petit Spartacus	Sara Ganem
2025 (50th)	A Lost Heart and Other Dreams of Beirut	Un cœur perdu et autres rêves de Beyrouth	Maya Abdul-Malak
2026 (51st)	Au Bain des Dames		Margaux fournier
2026 (51st)	Car Wash		Laïs Decaster
2026 (51st)	Ni Dieu ni père		Paul Kermarec

== See also ==
- Academy Award for Best Documentary Short Film
- Goya Award for Best Documentary Short Film
