= The Biggest Fan (2022 film) =

- French: J'adore ce que vous faites
- Directed by: Philippe Guillard
- Written by: Philippe Guillard
- Starring: Gérard Lanvin; Artus (humoriste)
- Cinematography: Manu Alberts
- Edited by: Vincent Zuffranieri
- Music by: Loris Bernot
- Production companies: Gaumont; Same Player; Montauk Films; France 2 Cinéma
- Distributed by: Gaumont
- Release dates: 22 January 2022 (L'Alpe d'Huez Film Festival); 18 May 2022 (France)
- Running time: 91 minutes
- Country: France
- Language: French

The Biggest Fan (French: J'adore ce que vous faites) is a French film directed by Philippe Guillard in 2021. It was screened at the 22nd January 2022 L'Alpe d'Huez Film Festival. It will have a cinema release in France the 18 May 2022.

== Plot ==
As Gérard Lanvin prepares to shoot one of the most important films of his career, in the south of France, his path crosses that of Momo Zapareto... to his greatest regret. Because Momo, is not just a fan, but a huge fan! For Gérard, the nightmare has only just begun...

== Cast ==
- Gérard Lanvin : lui-même
- Artus (humoriste) : Momo
- Antoine Bertrand : Bob Martel
- Antony Hickling : Tony Williams
- Caroline Bourg
- Lou Chauvain : l'Assistante de Gérard Lanvin
- Laura del Sol
- Natasha Andrews
