= Lost Illusions (2021 film) =

- Theatrical release poster
- Directed by: Xavier Giannoli
- Screenplay by: Xavier Giannoli; Jacques Fieschi
- Based on: Illusions perdues by Honoré de Balzac
- Produced by: Olivier Delbosc; Sidonie Dumas
- Starring: Benjamin Voisin; Xavier Dolan; Vincent Lacoste; Cécile de France; Gérard Depardieu; Jeanne Balibar
- Cinematography: Christophe Beaucarne
- Edited by: Riwanon Le Beller; Cyril Nakache
- Production companies: Curiosa Films; Umedia; UFund; France 3 Cinema; Canal+; Ciné+; Gaumont
- Distributed by: Gaumont
- Release dates: 5 September 2021 (Venice); 20 October 2021
- Running time: 141 minutes
- Country: France
- Language: French
- Budget: $17.5 million
- Box office: $8.6 million

Lost Illusions (French: Illusions perdues) is a 2021 French drama film directed by Xavier Giannoli, from a screenplay by Giannoli and Jacques Fieschi, based upon the first two parts of Illusions perdues (1837–43) by Honoré de Balzac. It stars Benjamin Voisin, Xavier Dolan, Vincent Lacoste, Cécile de France, Gérard Depardieu, and Jeanne Balibar.

It had its world premiere at the 78th Venice Film Festival on 5 September 2021. It is released in France on 20 October 2021, by Gaumont. The film received fifteen nominations at the 47th César Awards, winning in seven categories, including Best Film, Best Adapted Screenplay, Best Cinematography, Best Supporting Actor for Lacoste, and Most Promising Actor for Voisin.

== Plot summary ==
In 1820s France, 20-year-old poet Lucien de Rubempré travels from his provincial home in Angoulême to Paris after a contentious affair with a local society lady. He is sensitive, idealistic, handsome and determined to force the literary world to take notice. Contrary to his expectations, however, he discovers that he must make ends meet by writing scurrilous theater reviews and ends up beholden to the world of low-brow journalism.

At the behest of his crass boss, Étienne Lousteau, Lucien succumbs entirely to bribery and cronyism, achieving wealth and standing only at the cost of his artistic integrity and former friendships. In a last attempt to free himself from the all-consuming filth he is undone by his greatest weakness, his desire to transcend his low origins and illegitimate birth by buying a title of nobility. This too proves illusory and finally he is defeated and socially destroyed by the prevailing "fake news" cycle, returning home to defeat and obscurity.

== Cast ==
- Benjamin Voisin as Lucien de Rubempré
- Cécile de France as Marie-Louise-Anaïs de Bargeton
- Vincent Lacoste as Étienne Lousteau
- Xavier Dolan as Raoul Nathan
- Salomé Dewaels as Coralie
- Jeanne Balibar as Marquise d'Espard
- André Marcon as Baron du Châtelet
- Louis-Do de Lencquesaing as Finot
- Gérard Depardieu as Dauriat
- Jean-François Stévenin as Singali
- Candice Bouchet as Florine
- Jean-Marie Frin as Camusot
- Saïd Amadis as Matifat
- Isabelle de Hertogh as Bérénice
- Maryne Bertieaux as Eve
- Jean-Paul Muel as Bargeton

== Production ==
In September 2019, it was announced Benjamin Voisin, Xavier Dolan, Vincent Lacoste, Cécile de France, Gérard Depardieu, Jeanne Balibar, André Marcon, Jean-François Stévenin and Louis-Do de Lencquesaing had joined the cast of the film, with Xavier Giannoli directing from a screenplay by himself and Jacques Fieschi, based upon the novel Illusions perdues by Honoré de Balzac. Principal photography began in July 2019.

== Reception ==
On the review aggregator website Rotten Tomatoes, 93% of 55 reviews are positive; the "critic's consensus" states that the film "honors its classic source material with a beautifully acted drama that untangles knotty themes with infectious energy."
