= Académie des arts et techniques du cinéma =

French film organization and awards body

Académie des Arts et Techniques du Cinéma
- Formation: 1975
- Type: Film organization
- Headquarters: Paris, France
- Members: 4,509 (as of 11 November 2014)
- President: Margaret Ménégoz
- Website: academie-cinema.org

The Académie des Arts et Techniques du Cinéma (English: Academy of Cinema Arts and Techniques), commonly known as L'Académie des César, is an organization that bestows the César Award. It was founded in 1975 at the initiative of Georges Cravenne.

== Board of directors ==
The board is made up of 50 members, with an additional 13 selected for their contributions to cinema. They handle admissions, criteria and overall management.

Protests over the structure of the board came to a head in February 2020. An open letter signed by over 400 French directors and actors decried the "opaqueness" of the Board's structure and the lack of democratic governance; members of the Academy do not vote on leadership, unlike similar organizations such as the Motion Picture Academy or the BAFTA. In response, the entire board of directors resigned in the weeks before the 2019/2020 César Award ceremony.

== Academy president ==
The Academy is led by a president since its creation (Not to be confused with the president of the ceremony).

- 1976: Marcel Ichac (provisional title)
- 1976–1986: Robert Enrico
- 1986–1988: Jeanne Moreau
- 1988–1990: Alexandre Mnouchkine
- 1990–1992: Jean-Loup Dabadie
- 1992–2003: Daniel Toscan du Plantier
- 2003–2020: Alain Terzian
- 2020– : Margaret Ménégoz (ad interim)

== Les Nuits en Or (Golden Nights) ==
Les Nuits en Or (English: Golden Nights) is an annual invitation-only professional programme under the aegis of the academy. The programme, which was founded in 2007, is presented in partnership with Renault and was created to promote the dissemination of work by filmmakers from all over the world who are shaping the cinema of the future, to introduce them to the world of European cultural creation, and to forge closer ties between filmmakers by strengthening co-operation between their national cinema academies. The programme comprises three different aspects: The Panorama, The Tour and The Gala Dinner.

== The Panorama ==
The Panorama comprises a selection by the academy of the best short films from around the world. The selection is based on short films that received awards from their countries' national cinema academies during the previous year (e.g., Oscar, César, Goya, BAFTA, etc.). Representing a literal panorama of cinematographic creations from around the world, the films from this programme are presented in various European capital cities by the Académie des César and the respective national cinema academies. Screenings are either held all on the same night or over successive evenings. They are open to the public, free of charge.

== The Tour ==
This is a tour organized by the academy for the filmmakers selected for the Panorama lasting several days and taking in various European capitals where the Panorama screenings are scheduled to take place, giving them the opportunity to attend the public screenings of their films and to meet local film industry professionals. The Tour involves visits to places of historical and cultural significance in each country as well as an introduction to the national cinema academies and industry professionals of those countries and their film funding schemes. Part of the purpose of the Tour is to enable the filmmakers to meet potential producers and investors of their first and second feature films. Past cities of the Tour include Brussels, Luxembourg, Madrid, Stockholm, Montreal, Lisbon, Athens, Rome, Vienna and Paris.

== The Gala Dinner ==
The Gala Dinner is held at the headquarters of UNESCO in Paris, the World Heritage Centre, in honour of the filmmakers selected to participate in the Panorama. At the event, the filmmakers are partnered with leading industry professionals and awarded with golden medallions printed by Monnaie de Paris.
