= César Award for Best Costume Design =

French film award

- Country: France
- Presented by: Académie des Arts et Techniques du Cinéma
- First award: 1985
- Currently held by: Pascaline Chavanne for Nouvelle Vague (2026)
- Website: academie-cinema.org

The César Award for Best Costume Design (French: César des meilleurs costumes) is an award presented annually by the Académie des Arts et Techniques du Cinéma since 1985.

== Winners and nominees ==
=== 1980s ===
Year	Winner and nominees	Original title	Costume Designer(s)
1985 (10th)	Swann in Love	Un amour de Swann	Yvonne Sassinot de Nesle
1985 (10th)	Carmen		Enrico Job
1985 (10th)	Fort Saganne		Rosine Delamare and Corinne Jorry
1986 (11th)	Harem		Olga Berluti and Catherine Gorne-Achdjian
1986 (11th)	Bras de fer		Christian Dior and Elisabeth Tavernier
1986 (11th)	An Impudent Girl	L'Effrontée	Jacqueline Bouchard
1986 (11th)	Rendez-vous		Christian Gasc
1987 (12th)	Pirates (nominated for the Academy Award)		Anthony Powell
1987 (12th)	Mélo		Catherine Leterrier
1987 (12th)	Thérèse		Yvette Bonnay
1988 (13th)	Beatrice	La passion Béatrice	Jacqueline Moreau
1988 (13th)	Engagements of the Heart	De guerre lasse	Olga Berluti
1988 (13th)	Au revoir les enfants		Corinne Jorry
1989 (14th)	Camille Claudel		Dominique Borg
1989 (14th)	Chouans!		Yvonne Sassinot de Nesle
1989 (14th)	Life Is a Long Quiet River	La vie est un long fleuve tranquille	Elisabeth Tavernier

=== 1990s ===
Year	Winner and nominees	Original title	Costume designer(s)
1990 (15th)	Valmont (nominated for the Academy Award)		Theodor Pištěk
1990 (15th)	La Révolution française		Catherine Leterrier
1990 (15th)	Life and Nothing But	La vie et rien d'autre	Jacqueline Moreau
1991 (16th)	Cyrano de Bergerac (won the Academy Award)		Franca Squarciapino
1991 (16th)	Lacenaire		Yvonne Sassinot de Nesle
1991 (16th)	My Father's Glory; My Mother's Castle	La gloire de mon père Le château de ma mère	Agnès Nègre
1992 (17th)	Tous les Matins du Monde		Corinne Jorry
1992 (17th)	Delicatessen		Valérie Pozzo di Borgo
1992 (17th)	Van Gogh		Édith Vesperini
1993 (18th)	The Supper	Le souper	Sylvie de Segonzac
1993 (18th)	Indochine		Pierre-Yves Gayraud and Gabriella Pescucci
1993 (18th)	The Lover	L'amant	Yvonne Sassinot de Nesle
1994 (19th)	Germinal		Sylvie Gautrelet, Caroline de Vivaise and Bernadette Villard
1994 (19th)	Louis, the Child King	Louis, enfant roi	Franca Squarciapino
1994 (19th)	Les Visiteurs		Catherine Leterrier
1995 (20th)	La Reine Margot (nominated for the Academy Award)		Moidele Bickel
1995 (20th)	Colonel Chabert	Le colonel Chabert	Franca Squarciapino
1995 (20th)	Farinelli		Olga Berluti and Anne de Laugardière
1996 (21st)	Madame Butterfly		Christian Gasc
1996 (21st)	The City of Lost Children	La cité des enfants perdus	Jean-Paul Gaultier
1996 (21st)	The Horseman on the Roof	Le hussard sur le toit	Franca Squarciapino
1997 (22nd)	Ridicule		Christian Gasc
1997 (22nd)	Beaumarchais the Scoundrel	Beaumarchais, l'insolent	Sylvie de Segonzac
1997 (22nd)	Captain Conan	Capitaine Conan	Agnès Evein and Jacqueline Moreau
1998 (23rd)	On Guard	Le bossu	Christian Gasc
1998 (23rd)	Artemisia		Dominique Borg
1998 (23rd)	The Fifth Element		Jean-Paul Gaultier
1999 (24th)	Lautrec		Pierre-Jean Larroque
1999 (24th)	Don Juan		Sylvie de Segonzac
1999 (24th)	Place Vendôme		Nathalie du Roscoat and Elisabeth Tavernier

=== 2000s ===
Year	Winner and nominees	Original title	Costume designer(s)
2000 (25th)	The Messenger: The Story of Joan of Arc		Catherine Leterrier
2000 (25th)	Rembrandt		Eve-Marie Arnault
2000 (25th)	Time Regained	Le temps retrouvé	Gabriella Pescucci and Caroline de Vivaise
2001 (26th)	The King's Daughters	Saint-Cyr	Edith Vesperini and Jean-Daniel Vuillermoz
2001 (26th)	The King Is Dancing	Le Roi danse	Olivier Bériot
2001 (26th)	Vatel		Yvonne Sassinot de Nesle
2002 (27th)	Brotherhood of the Wolf	Le Pacte des loups	Dominique Borg
2002 (27th)	Amélie	Le Fabuleux Destin d'Amélie Poulain	Madeline Fontaine
2002 (27th)	The Lady and the Duke	L'Anglaise et le duc	Pierre-Jean Larroque
2002 (27th)	The Officers' Ward	La Chambre des officiers	Catherine Bouchard
2003 (28th)	Asterix & Obelix: Mission Cleopatra	Astérix & Obélix: Mission Cléopâtre	Philippe Guillotel, Tanino Liberatore and Florence Sadaune
2003 (28th)	8 Women	8 femmes	Pascaline Chavanne
2003 (28th)	The Pianist		Anna B. Sheppard
2004 (29th)	Not on the Lips	Pas sur la bouche	Jackie Budin
2004 (29th)	Bon Voyage		Catherine Leterrier
2004 (29th)	Monsieur N.		Carine Sarfati
2005 (30th)	A Very Long Engagement	Un long dimanche de fiançailles	Madeline Fontaine
2005 (30th)	Arsène Lupin		Pierre-Jean Larroque
2005 (30th)	Podium		Catherine Bouchard
2006 (31st)	Gabrielle		Caroline de Vivaise
2006 (31st)	Joyeux Noël		Alison Forbes-Meyler
2006 (31st)	Grey Souls	Les Âmes grises	Pascaline Chavanne
2007 (32nd)	Lady Chatterley		Marie-Claude Altot
2007 (32nd)	Days of Glory	Indigènes	Michèle Richer
2007 (32nd)	Private Fears in Public Places	Cœurs	Jackie Budin
2007 (32nd)	OSS 117: Cairo, Nest of Spies	OSS 117: Le Caire, nid d'espion	Charlotte David
2007 (32nd)	The Tiger Brigades	Les Brigades du Tigre	Pierre-Jean Larroque
2008 (33rd)	La Vie en Rose (nominated for the Academy Award)	La môme	Marit Allen
2008 (33rd)	Jacquou le Croquant		Jean-Daniel Vuillermoz
2008 (33rd)	Molière		Pierre-Jean Larroque
2008 (33rd)	The Second Wind	Le Deuxième Souffle	Corinne Jorry
2008 (33rd)	A Secret	Un secret	Jacqueline Bouchard
2009 (34th)	Séraphine		Madeline Fontaine
2009 (34th)	Female Agents	Les Femmes de l'ombre	Pierre-Jean Larroque
2009 (34th)	Paris 36	Faubourg 36	Carine Sarfati
2009 (34th)	Public Enemy Number One: Part 1 and 2	L'Instinct de mort and L'Ennemi public n°1	Virginie Montel
2009 (34th)	Sagan		Nathalie du Roscoat

=== 2010s ===
Year	Winner and nominees	Original title	Costume designer(s)
2010 (35th)	Coco Before Chanel (nominated for the Academy Award)	Coco avant Chanel	Catherine Leterrier
2010 (35th)	Coco Chanel & Igor Stravinsky		Chattoune and Fab
2010 (35th)	OSS 117: Lost in Rio	OSS 117: Rio ne répond plus	Charlotte David
2010 (35th)	Micmacs à tire-larigot		Madeline Fontaine
2010 (35th)	A Prophet	Un prophète	Virginie Montel
2011 (36th)	The Princess of Montpensier	La Princesse de Montpensier	Caroline De Vivaise
2011 (36th)	The Extraordinary Adventures of Adèle Blanc-Sec	Les Aventures extraordinaires d'Adèles Blanc-Sec	Olivier Bériot
2011 (36th)	Potiche		Pascaline Chavanne
2011 (36th)	On Tour	Tournée	Alexia Crisp-Jones
2011 (36th)	Of Gods and Men	Des hommes et des dieux	Marielle Robaut
2012 (37th)	House of Tolerance	L'Apollonide: Souvenirs de la maison close	Anaïs Romand
2012 (37th)	My Little Princess		Catherine Baba
2012 (37th)	The Artist		Mark Bridges
2012 (37th)	The Women on the 6th Floor	Les Femmes du 6ème étage	Christian Gasc
2012 (37th)	The Source	La Source des femmes	Viorica Petrovici
2013 (38th)	Farewell, My Queen	Les Adieux à la reine	Christian Gasc
2013 (38th)	Augustine		Pascaline Chavanne
2013 (38th)	Populaire		Charlotte David
2013 (38th)	Camille Rewinds	Camille redouble	Madeline Fontaine
2013 (38th)	My Way	Cloclo	Mimi Lempicka
2014 (39th)	Renoir		Pascaline Chavanne
2014 (39th)	Me, Myself and Mum	Les Garçons et Guillaume, à table!	Olivier Bériot
2014 (39th)	Age of Uprising: The Legend of Michael Kohlhaas	Michael Kohlhaas	Anina Diener
2014 (39th)	Mood Indigo	L'Écume des jours	Florence Fontaine
2014 (39th)	The Young and Prodigious T.S. Spivet		Madeline Fontaine
2015 (40th)	Saint Laurent		Anaïs Romand
2015 (40th)	Beauty and the Beast	La Belle et la Bête	Pierre-Yves Gayraud
2015 (40th)	The Connection	La French	Carine Sarfati
2015 (40th)	The New Girlfriend	Une nouvelle amie	Pascaline Chavanne
2015 (40th)	Yves Saint Laurent		Madeline Fontaine
2016 (41st)	Marguerite		Pierre-Jean Larroque
2016 (41st)	Diary of a Chambermaid	Journal d'une femme de chambre	Anaïs Romand
2016 (41st)	Mustang		Selin Sözen
2016 (41st)	The Scent of Mandarin	L'Odeur de la mandarine	Catherine Leterrier
2016 (41st)	My Golden Days	Trois souvenirs de ma jeunesse	Nathalie Raoul
2017 (42nd)	The Dancer	La Danseuse	Anaïs Romand
2017 (42nd)	Frantz		Pascaline Chavanne
2017 (42nd)	Slack Bay	Ma Loute	Alexandra Charles
2017 (42nd)	From the Land of the Moon	Mal de pierres	Catherine Leterrier
2017 (42nd)	A Woman's Life	Une vie	Madeline Fontaine
2018 (43rd)	See You Up There	Au revoir là-haut	Mimi Lempicka
2018 (43rd)	BPM (Beats per Minute)	120 battements par minute	Isabelle Pannetier
2018 (43rd)	Barbara		Pascaline Chavanne
2018 (43rd)	The Guardians	Les Gardiennes	Anaïs Romand
2018 (43rd)	Promise at Dawn	La Promesse de l'aube	Catherine Bouchard
2019 (44th)	Lady J	Mademoiselle de Joncquières	Pierre-Jean Larroque
2019 (44th)	The Emperor of Paris	L'Empereur de Paris	Pierre-Yves Gayraud
2019 (44th)	The Sisters Brothers	Les Frères Sisters	Milena Canonero
2019 (44th)	Memoir of War	La Douleur	Sergio Ballo and Anaïs Romand
2019 (44th)	One Nation, One King	Un peuple et son roi	Anaïs Romand

=== 2020s ===
Year	Winner and nominees	Original title	Costume designer(s)
2020 (45th)	An Officer and a Spy	J'accuse	Pascaline Chavanne
2020 (45th)	La Belle Époque		Emmanuelle Youchnovski
2020 (45th)	Edmond		Thierry Delettre
2020 (45th)	Joan of Arc	Jeanne	Alexandra Charles
2020 (45th)	Portrait of a Lady on Fire	Portrait de la jeune fille en feu	Dorothée Guiraud
2021 (46th)	How to Be a Good Wife	La Bonne Épouse	Madeline Fontaine
2021 (46th)	Bye Bye Morons	Adieu les cons	Mimi Lempicka
2021 (46th)	Love Affair(s)	Les Choses qu'on dit, les choses qu'on fait	Hélène Davoudian
2021 (46th)	De Gaulle		Anaïs Romand and Sergio Ballo
2021 (46th)	Summer of 85	Été 85	Pascaline Chavanne
2022 (47th)	Lost Illusions	Illusions perdues	Pierre-Jean Laroque
2022 (47th)	Aline		Catherine Leterrier
2022 (47th)	Annette		Pascaline Chavanne
2022 (47th)	Delicious	Délicieux	Madeline Fontaine
2022 (47th)	Eiffel		Thierry Delettre
2023 (48th)	Simone Veil, A Woman of the Century	Simone, le voyage du siècle	Gigi Lepage
2023 (48th)	Forever Young	Les Amandiers	Caroline de Vivaise
2023 (48th)	The Colours of Fire	Couleurs de l'incendie	Pierre-Jean Larroque
2023 (48th)	Waiting for Bojangles	En attendant Bojangles	Emmanuelle Youchnovski
2023 (48th)	The Innocent	L'Innocent	Corinne Bruand
2023 (48th)	Pacifiction	Pacifiction – Tourment sur les îles	Praxedes de Vilallonga
2024 (49th)	The Animal Kingdom	Le Règne animal	Ariane Daurat
2024 (49th)	The Crime Is Mine	Mon crime	Pascaline Chavanne
2024 (49th)	Jeanne du Barry		Jürgen Doering
2024 (49th)	The Taste of Things	La Passion de Dodin Bouffant	Tran Nu Yên Khé
2024 (49th)	The Three Musketeers: D'Artagnan	Les Trois Mousquetaires: D'Artagnan	Thierry Delettre
2024 (49th)	The Three Musketeers: Milady	Les Trois Mousquetaires: Milady	Thierry Delettre
2025 (50th)	The Count of Monte Cristo	Le Comte de Monte-Cristo	Thierry Delettre
2025 (50th)	Beating Hearts	L'Amour ouf	Isabelle Pannetier
2025 (50th)	The Divine Sarah Bernhardt	Sarah Bernhardt, la divine	Anaïs Romand
2025 (50th)	Emilia Pérez		Virginie Montel
2025 (50th)	Monsieur Aznavour		Isabelle Mathieu
2026 (51st)	Nouvelle Vague		Pascaline Chavanne
2026 (51st)	Colours of Time	La Venue de l'avenir	Marie Cheminal
2026 (51st)	La Condition		Céline Guignard
2026 (51st)	Dracula		Corinne Bruand
2026 (51st)	The Richest Woman in the World	La femme la plus riche du monde	Jürgen Doering

== See also ==
- Academy Award for Best Costume Design
- BAFTA Award for Best Costume Design
- Magritte Award for Best Costume Design
