= 17th César Awards =

1992 French film awards ceremony

- Date: 22 February 1992
- Site: Palais des Congrès, Paris, France
- Hosted by: Frédéric Mitterrand

Highlights
- Best Film: Tous les matins du monde
- Best Actor: Jacques Dutronc
- Best Actress: Jeanne Moreau

Television coverage
- Network: Antenne 2

The 17th César Awards ceremony, presented by the Académie des Arts et Techniques du Cinéma, honoured the best French films of 1991 and took place on 22 February 1992 at the Palais des Congrès in Paris. The ceremony was chaired by Michèle Morgan and hosted by Frédéric Mitterrand. Tous les matins du monde won the award for Best Film.

== Winners and nominees ==
The winners are highlighted in bold:

- Best Film:
  **Tous les matins du monde**, directed by Alain Corneau
  Merci la vie, directed by Bertrand Blier
  La Belle Noiseuse, directed by Jacques Rivette
  Van Gogh, directed by Maurice Pialat
- Best Foreign Film:
  **Toto le Héros**, directed by Jaco Van Dormael
  Alice, directed by Woody Allen
  Dances with Wolves, directed by Kevin Costner
  The Silence of the Lambs, directed by Jonathan Demme
  Thelma & Louise, directed by Ridley Scott
  Urga, directed by Nikita Mikhalkov
- Best Debut:
  **Delicatessen**, directed by Marc Caro, Jean-Pierre Jeunet
  Les Arcandiers, directed by Manuel Sanchez
  L'Autre, directed by Bernard Giraudeau
  Fortune Express, directed by Olivier Schatzky
  Lune froide, directed by Patrick Bouchitey
- Best Actor:
  **Jacques Dutronc**, for Van Gogh
  Michel Piccoli, for La Belle Noiseuse
  Hippolyte Girardot, for Hors la vie
  Jean-Pierre Marielle, for Tous les matins du monde
  Gérard Jugnot, for Une époque formidable...
- Best Actress:
  **Jeanne Moreau**, for La vieille qui marchait dans la mer
  Anouk Grinberg, for Merci la vie
  Juliette Binoche, for Les Amants du Pont-Neuf
  Emmanuelle Béart, for La Belle Noiseuse
  Irène Jacob, for La Double vie de Véronique
- Best Supporting Actor:
  **Jean Carmet**, for Merci la vie
  Jean-Claude Dreyfus, for Delicatessen
  Ticky Holgado, for Une époque formidable...
  Bernard Le Coq, for Van Gogh
  Gérard Séty, for Van Gogh
- Best Supporting Actress:
  **Anne Brochet**, for Tous les matins du monde
  Catherine Jacob, for Merci la vie
  Jane Birkin, for La Belle Noiseuse
  Hélène Vincent, for J'embrasse pas
  Valérie Lemercier, for L'Opération Corned-Beef
- Most Promising Actor:
  **Manuel Blanc**, for J'embrasse pas
  Laurent Grévill, for L'Année de l'éveil
  Thomas Langmann, for Paris s'éveille
  Guillaume Depardieu, for Tous les matins du monde
  Chick Ortega, for Une époque formidable...
- Most Promising Actress:
  **Géraldine Pailhas**, for La Neige et le feu
  Marie-Laure Dougnac, for Delicatessen
  Marie Gillain, for Mon père, ce héros
  Alexandra London, for Van Gogh
  Elsa Zylberstein, for Van Gogh
- Best Director:
  **Alain Corneau**, for Tous les matins du monde
  Bertrand Blier, for Merci la vie
  Jacques Rivette, for La Belle Noiseuse
  André Téchiné, for J'embrasse pas
  Maurice Pialat, for Van Gogh
- Best Original Screenplay or Adaptation:
  **Gilles Adrien, Marc Caro, Jean-Pierre Jeunet**, for Delicatessen
  Bertrand Blier, for Merci la vie
  Alain Corneau, Pascal Quignard, for Tous les matins du monde
  Maurice Pialat, for Van Gogh
- Best Cinematography:
  **Yves Angelo**, for Tous les matins du monde
  Darius Khondji, for Delicatessen
  Gilles Henry, Emmanuel Machuel, for Van Gogh
- Best Costume Design:
  **Corinne Jorry**, for Tous les matins du monde
  Valérie Pozzo di Borgo, for Delicatessen
  Édith Vesperini, for Van Gogh
- Best Sound:
  **Anne Le Campion, Pierre Gamet, Gérard Lamps, Pierre Verany**, for Tous les matins du monde
  Vincent Arnardi, Jérôme Thiault, for Delicatessen
  Jean-Pierre Duret, François Groult, for Van Gogh
- Best Editing:
  **Hervé Schneid**, for Delicatessen
  Claudine Merlin, for Merci la vie
  Marie-Josèphe Yoyotte, for Tous les matins du monde
- Best Music:
  **Jordi Savall**, for Tous les matins du monde
  Carlos D'Alessio, for Delicatessen
  Zbigniew Preisner, for La Double vie de Véronique
  Jean-Claude Petit, for Mayrig
- Best Production Design:
  **Jean-Philippe Carp, Miljen Kreka Kljakovic**, for Delicatessen
  Michel Vandestien, for Les Amants du Pont-Neuf
  Philippe Pallut, Katia Wyszkop, for Van Gogh
- Best Animated Short:
  **J'entends plus la guitare**, directed by Bernard Palacios
  **La Saga des glaises**, directed by David Ferre, Olivier Théry-Lapiney
- Best Short Film:
  **25 décembre 58, 10h36**, directed by Diane Bertrand
  Haut pays des neiges, directed by Bernard Palacios
  Hermann Heinzel, ornithologue, directed by Jacques Mitsch
  La Saga des Glaises, directed by David Ferre, Olivier Thery Lapiney
- Honorary César:
  Michèle Morgan
  Sylvester Stallone

== See also ==
- 64th Academy Awards
- 45th British Academy Film Awards
