= Grave of Jacques-Louis David =

Monument in Brussels Cemetery, Evere

The Grave of Jacques-Louis David is an obelisque by an unknown artist in honor of the exiled French painter Jacques-Louis David in the Brussels Cemetery.

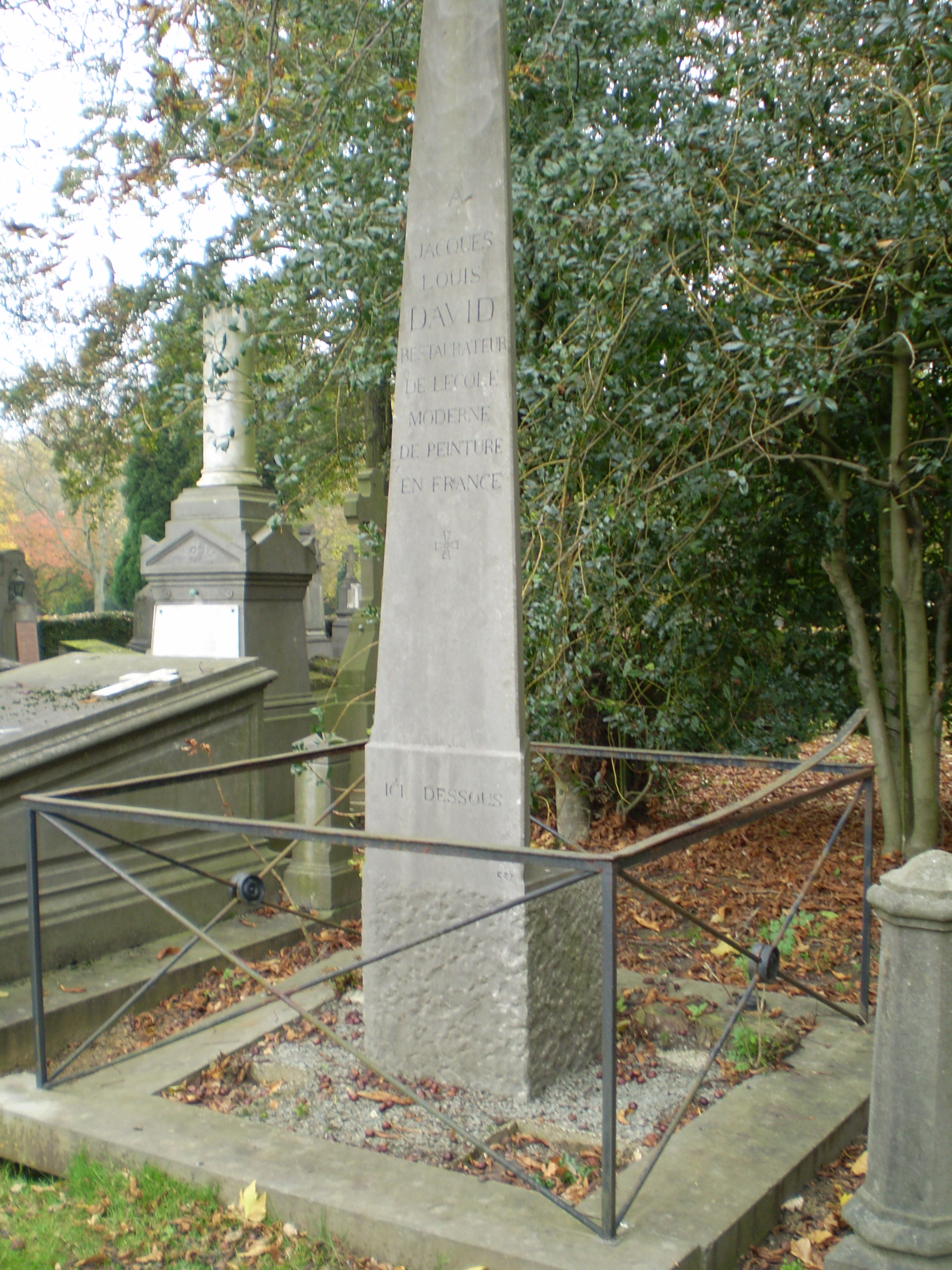
Tomb of David

It was moved there from its original location after the artist's death on 25 December 1825 where his body had been resting in the old churchyard of the Collegiate Church of St. Michael and St. Gudula (now Brussels' cathedral) while waiting for posthumous repatriation to France. However, as a notable participant of the Reign of Terror, his body was not accepted for repatriation, and the lead-lined oak casket was left where it was. Thanks to an initiative by Jobard, a monument was erected with the text "À Jacques-Louis David restaurateur de l'école moderne de peinture de France ici dessous" (To Jacques-Louis David, restorer of the school of modern art of France, buried here). In 1882 a grandson requested that the monument be moved to a more prominent location and the body was re-buried at the Mayor's circle in the city cemetery of Evere.

On 4 March 1993 the council voted to give the grave monument status based on the historical legacy of David as a painter and the context of the obelisque symbolizing the great admiration that the painter had for the Egypt campaign of Napoleon and the amount that could be learned from the ancient art brought back to Europe by that expedition. The grave is maintained by the "Association des artistes peintres, sculpteurs, architectes et dessinateurs". In 1971 the eternity concession was reissued for 50 years, so the maintenance concession will be retired in 2021.

== Wife's grave ==
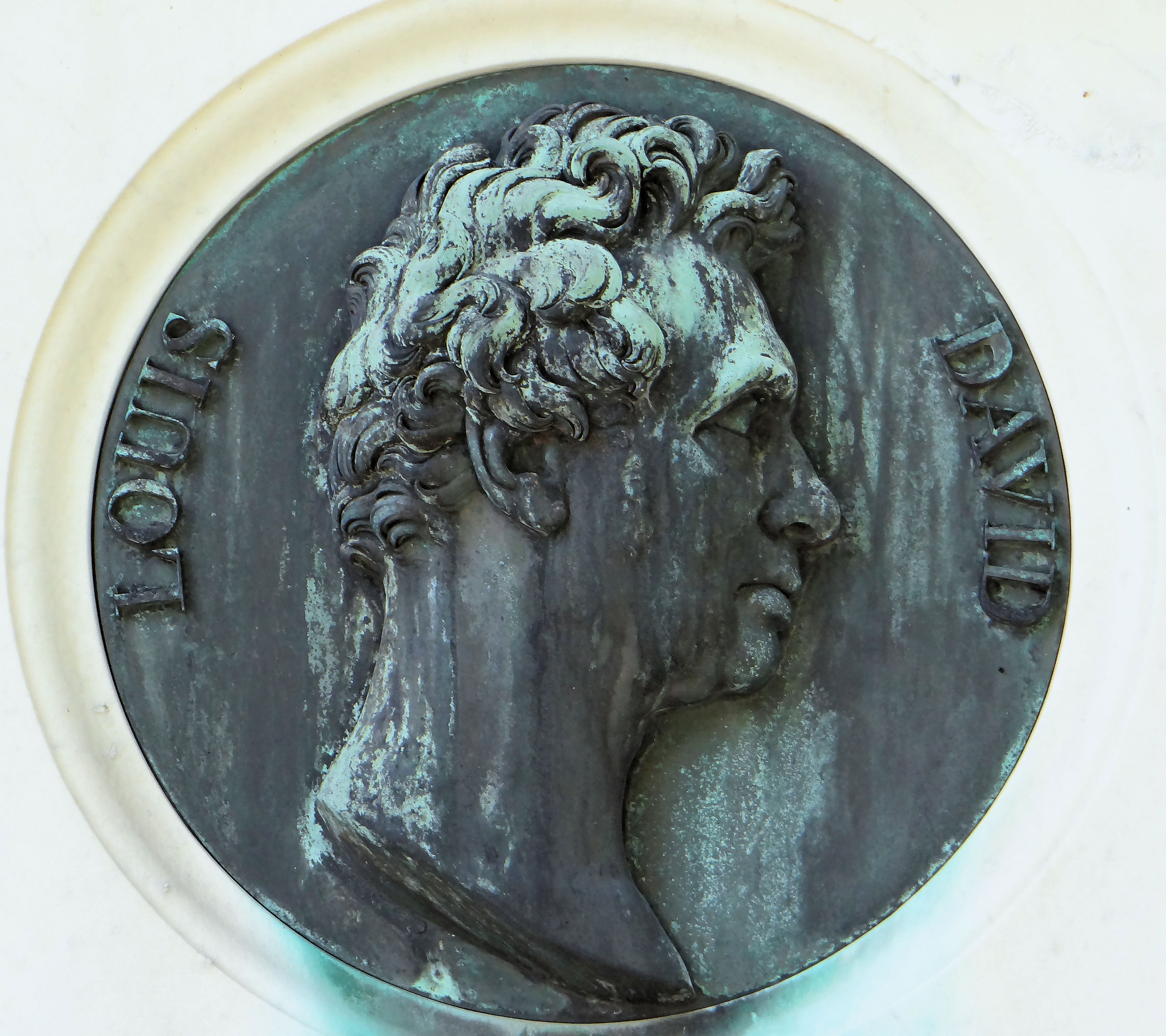
Relief of David on wife's grave in Paris

David's wife Marguerite Charlotte Pécoul is buried in Père Lachaise Cemetery in Paris, and a medaillon of David in relief has been mounted on her grave, where Joseph Marty claimed his heart is buried, oddly only mentioning that it was "near his wife's body" but without mentioning her name.
