= Édith Vesperini =

French costume designer (born 1945)

Édith Vesperini (born 24 March 1945 in Paris) is a French costume designer for cinema, television, and theater. She won the César Award for Best Costume Design for The King's Daughters.

== Filmography ==
=== Cinema ===
- The Recourse to the Method (1978)
- Womanlight (1979)
- Sophie's Misfortunes (1980)
- Qu'est-ce qu'on attend pour être heureux! (1982)
- Three Men and a Cradle (1985)
- Van Gogh (1991)
- The Little Apocalypse (1993)
- Happiness Is in the Field (1995)
- Man Is a Woman (1998)
- The King's Daughters (2000)
- Druids (2001)
- Amen. (2002)
- The Colonel (2005)
- The Sea Wall (2008)
- Outside the Law (2010)
- Angélique (2013)
- Victor Young Perez (2013)
- Je ne rêve que de vous (2018)

=== Television ===
- Dust and Blood (1991)
- Sur le lieu (1991)
- Arthur Rimbaud, l'homme aux semelles (1994)
- Le monde d'Angelo (1997)
- Madame Sans-Gêne (2001)
- Capitaine des ténèbres (2004)
- A droite toute ! (2007)
- Louise Michel (2009–2014)
- Jeanne Devère (2010)
- Mystère au Moulin-Rouge (2011)
- La Baie d'Alger (2011)
- Résistance (2014)
- Nicolas Le Floch (2015)
- Un avion sans elle (2018)
