= Portrait of Charles-Pierre Pécoul =

1784 painting by Jacques-Louis David

Portrait of Charles-Pierre Pecoul
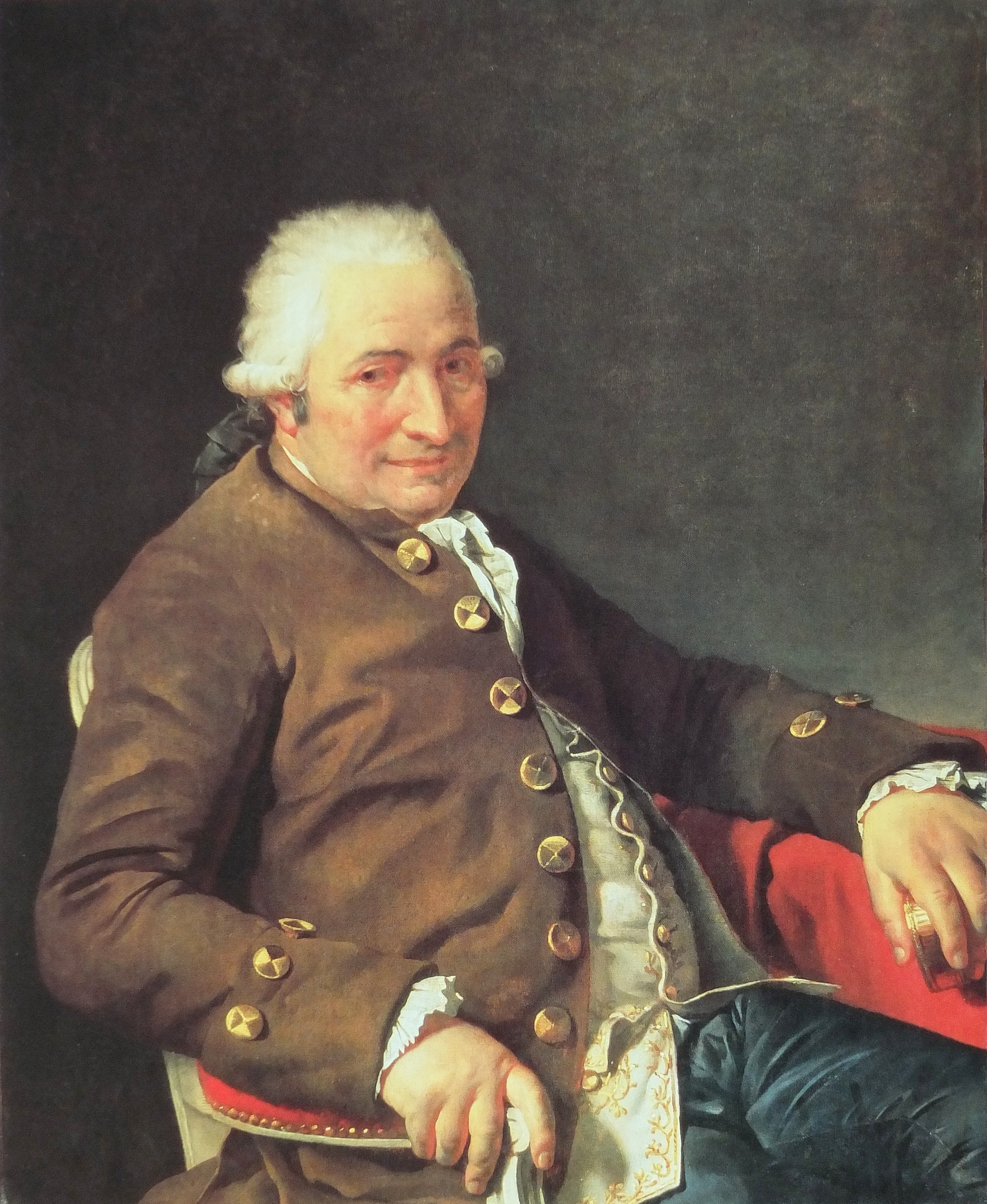
- Artist: Jacques-Louis David
- Year: 1784
- Medium: Oil on canvas
- Dimensions: 91.5 cm × 72.5 cm (36.0 in × 28.5 in)
- Location: Musée du Louvre, Paris

Portrait of Charles-Pierre Pécoul is an oil-on-canvas painting by the French Neoclassical artist Jacques-Louis David, completed in 1784. The sitter, Charles-Pierre Pécoul, was an official responsible for royal building contracts and the father of the painter's wife Charlotte.

== Description ==
The portrait shows Pécoul seated against a dark background, wearing a brown coat with gold buttons and a white cravat. He is depicted in three-quarter view with a composed posture. The restrained use of color and simple background are characteristic of David's early portraiture.

== See also ==
- List of paintings by Jacques-Louis David
