= Mina Tannenbaum =

- Directed by: Martine Dugowson
- Written by: Martine Dugowson
- Produced by: Georges Benayoun; Paul Rosenberg
- Starring: Romane Bohringer; Elsa Zylberstein; Cathy Tastet; Florence Thomassin; Artus de Penguern; Jean-Louis Sbille
- Cinematography: Dominique Chapuis
- Edited by: Martine Barraqué; Dominique Galliéni
- Music by: Roland Katz
- Distributed by: UGC
- Release date: 2 March 1994
- Running time: 124 minutes
- Countries: France; Netherlands; Belgium
- Language: French

Mina Tannenbaum is a 1994 French film written and directed by Martine Dugowson, her debut feature. It stars Romane Bohringer and Elsa Zylberstein.

It won the Boston Society of Film Critics Award for Best Foreign Language Film, and was nominated for a César Award for Best Debut and Most Promising Actress.

== Plot ==
Mina Tannenbaum and Ethel Benegui are two Jewish girls living in Paris. They were born on the same day, 5 April 1958, at the Rothschild Hospital, Mina just before Ethel. They first meet when they are seven years old. As their religion makes them feel like outsiders at school, they form a friendship as a result, despite having nothing else in common. Ethel is extroverted and comes from a middle-class family, while Mina is introverted and comes from a lower-class background. Their friendship continues as they grow up, but as adults they start to drift apart. Mina becomes an artist and although she finds men attractive, she is afraid to approach them. Ethel meanwhile becomes a journalist specializing in popular culture, and finds herself in a string of relationships that prove unsatisfying. They soon realize how their differences have put a strain on their relationship.
