= Elsa Zylberstein =

French actress (born 1968)

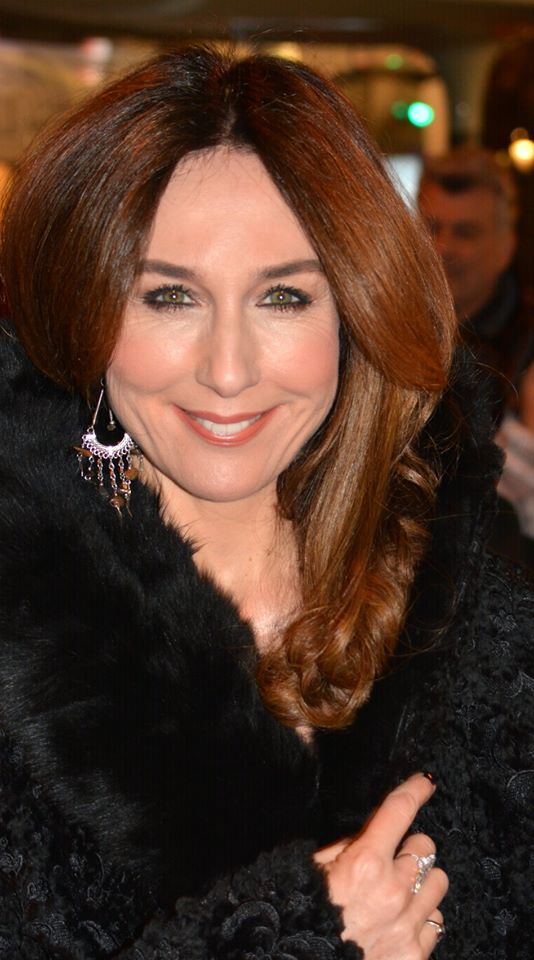
- Zylberstein in 2018
- Born: Elsa Florence Zylbersztejn; 16 October 1968 (age 58); Paris, France
- Other name: Elsa Steiner
- Occupation: Actress
- Years active: 1989–present
- Website: www.elsa-zylberstein.com

Elsa Zylberstein (born Elsa Florence Zylbersztejn, 16 October 1968) is a French actress. After studying drama, she began her film career in 1989, and has appeared in more than 60 films. She won the César Award for Best Supporting Actress for I've Loved You So Long (2008).

== Early life and education ==
Zylberstein was born Elsa Florence Zylbersztejn on 16 October 1968 in Boulogne-Billancourt, in Paris to a Polish-Jewish father, Albert Zylbersztejn (born 1938). Her mother was French Catholic, Liliane Chenard (born 1940). Her father is a former physicist and her mother is a beautician for Dior. She has a brother, Benjamin (born c. 1970). Zylberstein felt both Jewish and Christian; as of 2006, she is "attracted to Buddhist rites".

She has practised classical dance since her childhood. After a Baccalauréat A3, she began university and studied English, but she was strongly attracted to artistic pursuits. She studied acting under Francis Huster at the Cours Florent on the advice of Charlotte Rampling, whom Elsa Zylberstein's father met by chance on a plane, and also works with a professor at the Actors Studio.

== Career ==
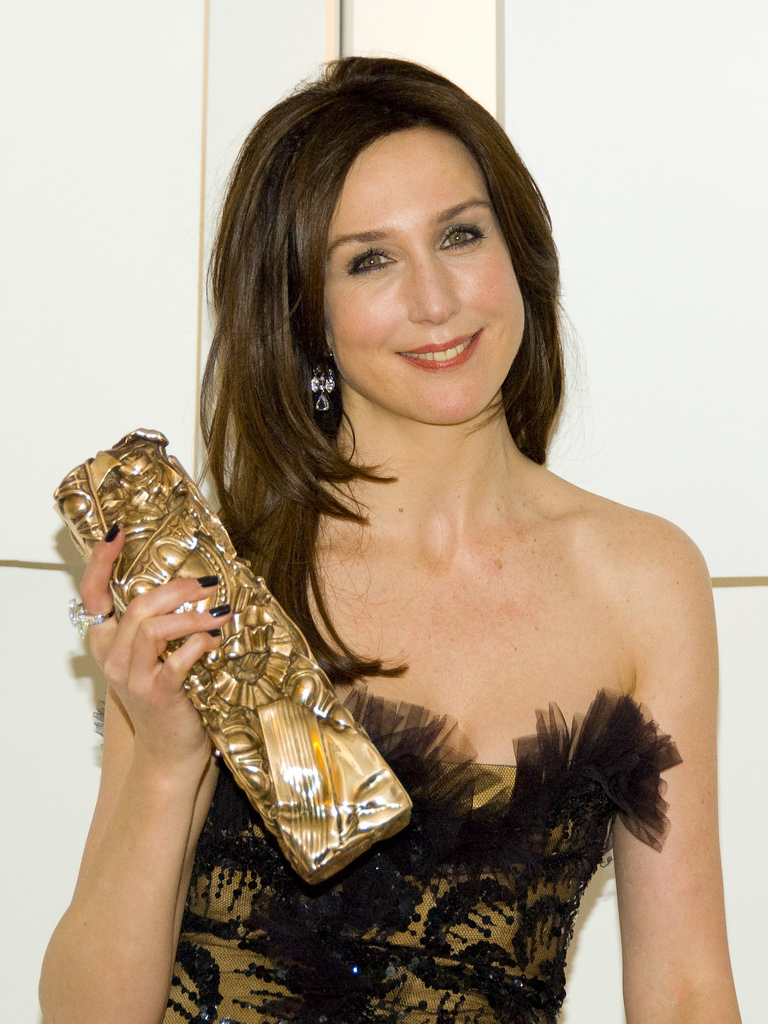
Elsa Zylberstein in 2009, at the 34th César Awards

In 1991, Elsa Zylberstein appeared in Van Gogh, a film directed by Maurice Pialat. In 1992, she won the Michel Simon Prize and the first of her three nominations for the César Award for Most Promising Actress. In 1993, she played a student in Beau fixe, and won the Prix Romy Schneider.

She inspired young directors such as Pascale Bailly, Diane Bertrand, and especially Martine Dugowson, who offered her the lead role alongside Romane Bohringer in Mina Tannenbaum (1994). She then appeared in Farinelli, Mr N., and Jefferson in Paris. She played Suzanne Valadon in Lautrec, and then Jeanne Hébuterne in Modigliani. Zylberstein played a Yiddish-language singer who falls in love with a gay clarinetist in Man Is a Woman, which also starred Antoine de Caunes. She also appeared in the films Time Regained, Love Torn in a Dream, and That Day, all three of which were directed by Raúl Ruiz.

In 2006 she played Mathilde, an Orthodox Jewish woman faced with marriage problems, in Little Jerusalem. She also appeared in J'invente rien, based on a novel by Christine Angot. In 2008, she was in two films which were each presented at the Berlin Festival: I've Loved You So Long, with Kristin Scott Thomas, directed by Philippe Claudel, and La Fabrique des sentiments.

== Other activities ==
She has been a member of several festival juries, including the 1999 Deauville American Film Festival, the 2010 British Film Festival in Dinard, the Beaune International Detective Film Festival (in both 2009 and 2015) and the Cannes Film Festival in 2021.

== Recognition and awards ==
Zylberstein received the Michel Simon Prize in 1992 for her performance in Van Gogh, as well as a César nomination for Best Female Newcomer.

In 1993 she won the Romy Schneider Prize for Mina Tannenbaum.

In 2009, she won the César Award for Best Supporting Actress for her role in I've Loved You So Long.

In 2020, Zylberstein won the Best Acting Award for Tout nous sourit at the Alpe d'Huez Comedy Festival.

== Personal life ==
Zylberstein dated Antoine de Caunes between 1997 and 2005. She then dated Nicolas Bedos from 2005 to 2008.

In 2009, Zylberstein signed a petition in support of film director Roman Polanski, calling for his release after Polanski was arrested in Switzerland in relation to his 1977 sexual abuse case.

== Filmography ==
Year	Title	Role	Director	Notes
1989	Baptême	Gabrielle	René Féret	
1990	Chillers	Isabelle	Maurice Dugowson	TV series (1 Episode)
1991	Génial, mes parents divorcent !	Thomas's Sister	Patrick Braoudé	
1991	Van Gogh	Cathy	Maurice Pialat	Acteurs à l'Écran - Best Actress; Nominated - César Award for Most Promising Actress
1991	La neige et le feu		Claude Pinoteau	
1991	Alisée	Alisée	André Blanchard	
1992	Amoureuse	The Farsighted	Jacques Doillon	
1992	Beau fixe	Frederique	Christian Vincent	Nominated - César Award for Most Promising Actress
1992	Princesse Alexandra	Sister Ermenegilde	Denis Amar	TV movie
1992	La grande collection	Mercedes	Gérard Vergez	TV series (1 Episode)
1993	De force avec d'autres	Do	Simon Reggiani	
1993	La place d'un autre	Florence	René Féret (2)	
1993	Comment font les gens	Yvette	Pascale Bailly	Short
1993	L'orange amère	Fanny	Olivier Sadock	Short
1993	The Young Indiana Jones Chronicles	The Telephone Girl	Simon Wincer & Carl Schultz	TV series (1 Episode)
1994	Mina Tannenbaum	Ethel Benegui	Martine Dugowson	Nominated - César Award for Most Promising Actress
1994	Farinelli	Alexandra	Gérard Corbiau	
1995	Jefferson in Paris	Adrienne de La Fayette	James Ivory	
1996	A Saturday on Earth	Claire	Diane Bertrand	
1996	Portraits chinois	Emma	Martine Dugowson (2)	
1997	Tenue correcte exigée	Lucie	Philippe Lioret	
1997	Metroland	Annick	Philip Saville	
1997	XXL	Arlette Stern	Ariel Zeitoun	
1998	Man Is a Woman	Rosalie Baumann	Jean-Jacques Zilbermann	Cabourg Film Festival - Best Actress
1998	Lautrec	Suzanne Valadon	Roger Planchon	
1999	Je veux tout	Eva	Guila Braoudé	
1999	Time Regained	Rachel	Raúl Ruiz	
1999	Bonne Nuit	Susan		TV movie
2000	Là-bas... mon pays	Pierre Nivel's Wife	Alexandre Arcady	
2000	Love Torn in a Dream	Lucrezia / Jessica / Sultane	Raúl Ruiz (2)	
2001	Les fantômes de Louba	Louba	Martine Dugowson (3)	
2001	Un ange	Léa Pastore	Miguel Courtois	
2001	Not Afraid, Not Afraid		Annette Carducci	
2002	Féroce	Zébulon	Gilles de Maistre	
2002	Jean Moulin	Antoinette	Yves Boisset	TV movie
2003	Monsieur N.	Albine de Montholon	Antoine de Caunes	
2003	That Day	Livia	Raúl Ruiz (3)	
2003	Three Blind Mice	Nathalie	Mathias Ledoux	
2003	Qui perd gagne !	Angèle Berstein	Laurent Bénégui	
2004	Tomorrow We Move	Michèle	Chantal Akerman	
2004	Pourquoi (pas) le Brésil	Christine Angot	Laetitia Masson	
2004	Modigliani	Jeanne Hébuterne	Mick Davis	
2005	Little Jerusalem	Mathilde	Karin Albou	Nominated - Globes de Cristal Award for Best Actress
2005	La cloche a sonné	Léa	Bruno Herbulot	
2005	Journées froides qui menacent les plantes		Virginie Chanu	
2006	J'invente rien	Mathilde Mahut	Michel Leclerc	
2006	Le concile de pierre	Clarisse	Guillaume Nicloux	
2006	Petits meurtres en famille	Édith	Edwin Baily	TV Mini-Series
2007	Unknown Things	The Young Woman	Bruno Coppola	
2007	Childhoods	Ingmar Bergman's Mother	Safy Nebbou	
2008	La fabrique des sentiments	Éloïse	Jean-Marc Moutout	
2008	I've Loved You So Long	Léa	Philippe Claudel	César Award for Best Supporting Actress; Chlotrudis Awards - Best Supporting Actress
2008	Nuit de chien	Maria de Souza	Werner Schroeter	
2008	Nucingen House	Anne-Marie	Raúl Ruiz (4)	
2009	La folle histoire d'amour de Simon Eskenazy	Rosalie	Jean-Jacques Zilbermann (2)	
2009	La double inconstance	Flaminia	Carole Giacobbi	TV movie
2009	Myster Mocky présente	Various	Jean-Pierre Mocky	TV series (1 Episode)
2009	Vénus & Apollon	Angie	Pascal Lahmani	TV series (8 Episodes)
2010	Roses à crédit	The Pharmacist	Amos Gitai	
2011	Un baiser papillon	Marie	Karine Silla	
2011	JC comme Jésus Christ	Herself	Jonathan Zaccaï	
2011	Les tribulations d'une caissière	Marie	Pierre Rambaldi	
2012	Plan de table	Catherine	Christelle Raynal	Alpe d'Huez International Comedy Film Festival - Best Acting
2012	Lines of Wellington	Sister Irmã Cordélia	Valeria Sarmiento	Nominated - CinEuphoria Awards - Best Ensemble
2013	À votre bon coeur mesdames	Sister Blandine	Jean-Pierre Mocky (2)	
2014	Gemma Bovery	Wizzy	Anne Fontaine	
2015	The Price of Desire	Romaine Brooks	Mary McGuckian	
2015	Un plus une	Anna Hamon	Claude Lelouch	Nominated - Lumière Award for Best Actress
2015	Amazon	Amazon Priestess	Jeno Udvardi	
2016	The Stalking Moon	Veronique Fournier	Antonio Galloro	
2017	Un sac de billes	Anna	Christian Duguay	
2017	Chacun sa vie et son intime conviction		Claude Lelouch	
2017	À bras ouverts	Daphné Fougerole	Philippe de Chauveron	
2018	Bel Canto		Paul Weitz	
2019	I Wish Someone Were Waiting for Me Somewhere	Hélèna	Arnaud Viard	
2020	Waiting for Anya	Jo's mother		
2021	Simone Veil, A Woman of the Century	Simone Veil		
2022	Bigbug	Monique	Jean-Pierre Jeunet	Netflix
2023	Club Zero	Elsa's Mother	Jessica Hausner	
2023	Coup de chance	Caroline Blanc	Woody Allen	
2024	Finalement		Claude Lelouch	

== Theatre ==
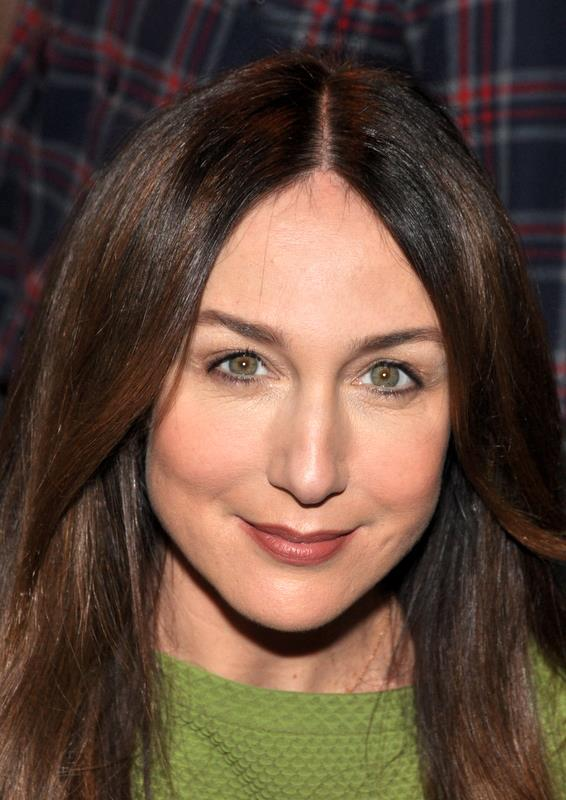
Elsa Zylberstein in March 2013

Year	Title	Author	Director	Notes
1990	Joko's Anniversary	Roland Topor	Jean-Louis Jacopin	Petit Odéon
1991	Eurydice	Jean Anouilh	Georges Wilson	Théâtre de l'Œuvre
1993	Pygmalion	George Bernard Shaw	Bernard Murat	Théâtre Hébertot
1997–98	Six Characters in Search of an Author	Luigi Pirandello	Jorge Lavelli	Théâtre de l'Eldorado
2000	Le Malin Plaisir	David Hare	Jacques Lassalle	Théâtre de l'Atelier
2003	Proof	David Auburn	Bernard Murat (2)	Théâtre des Mathurins
2005	Laissez-moi	Marcelle Sauvageot	Laetitia Masson	Théâtre des Bouffes du Nord
2007	Gamines	Sylvie Testud	Sylvie Testud	Théâtre national de Nice
2009	Le Démon de Hannah	Antoine Rault	Michel Fagadau	Théâtre des Champs-Élysées
2011	Le Temps qui passe	Karine Silla-Pérez	Vincent Pérez	Théâtre des Mathurins
2012	Les Derniers Jours de Stefan Zweig	Laurent Seksik	Gérard Gélas	Théâtre Antoine-Simone Berriau
2014	Vita and Virginia	Eileen Atkins	Jean-Marie Besset	Festival NAVA
2014	Splendour	Géraldine Maillet	Catherine Schaub	Théâtre de Paris; Globes de Cristal Award - Best Actress
