= Christian Gasc =

French costumer (1945–2022)

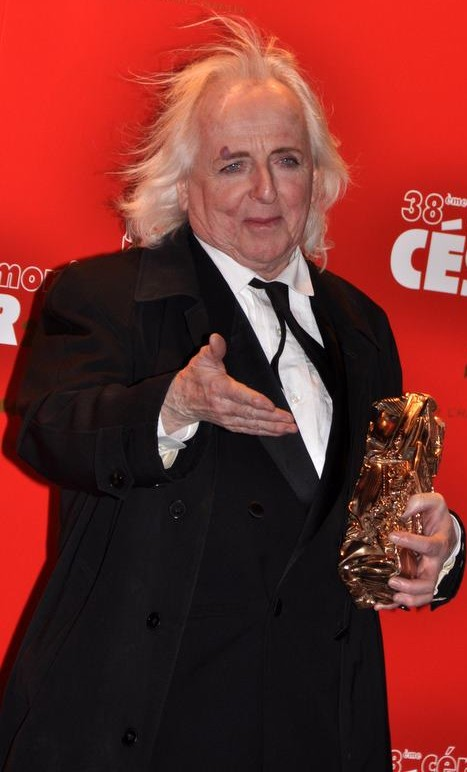
- Gasc in 2013
- Born: 8 August 1945; Dunes, France
- Died: 11 January 2022 (aged 76); Paris, France
- Occupation: Costumer

Christian Gasc (8 August 1945 – 11 January 2022) was a French costumer for film, theatre, and opera. He was a four-time winner of the César Award for Best Costume Design, one-time winner of the Molière du créateur de costumes, and was once nominated for the Satellite Award for Best Costume Design.

== Biography ==
Gasc was born in Dunes on 8 August 1945 to a mechanic father and wife a seamstress mother. He discovered cinema in Valence at the age of eight and moved to Paris at nineteen. There, he met Liliane de Kermadec who proposed that he create costumes for her film, Aloïse. He won three consecutive César Awards for the films Madame Butterfly, Ridicule, and On Guard. He was close with several directors who helped his career greatly, such as Pierre Klossowski, Benoît Jacquot, and Pierre Romans, as well as screenwriters such as Roland Barthes, Marguerite Duras, and Hervé Guibert.

In 2015, an exhibition on his costumes for the film Farewell, My Queen was displayed at the Musée de la dentelle de Caudry.

Gasc was found dead in his Parisian apartment on 10 January 2022 at the age of 76.

== Filmography ==
=== Cinema ===
- Aloïse (1975)
- French Provincial (1975)
- Lumière (1976)
- Surreal Estate (1976)
- Barocco (1976)
- Les Apprentis Sorciers (1977)
- Les Rendez-vous d'Anna (1977)
- The Green Room (1978)
- Roberte (film) (1979)
- Return to the Beloved (1979)
- The Brontë Sisters (1979)
- Courage fuyons (1979)
- Loulou (1980)
- The Wings of the Dove (1981)
- Hotel America (1981)
- The Big Pardon (1982)
- Passion (1982)
- Cap Canaille (1983)
- The Children (1984)
- Rendez-vous (1985)
- Scene of the Crime (1986)
- Havre (1986)
- Les Innocents (1987)
- Chocolat (1988)
- Walking a Tightrope (1991)
- Madame Butterfly (1995)
- Ridicule (1996)
- My Man (1996)
- On Guard (1997)
- Augustin, King of Kung-Fu (1999)
- The Widow of Saint-Pierre (2000)
- Sade (2000)
- Tosca (2001)
- Strayed (2003)
- Les Côtelettes (2003)
- Changing Times (2004)
- The Black Box (2005)
- The Women on the 6th Floor (2010)
- Farewell, My Queen (2012)
- Madame Bovary (2014)
- Being 17 (2016)

=== Television ===
- The Counterfeiters (2010)
