= Boston Society of Film Critics Award for Best Foreign Language Film =

Annual US film award

- Description: Annual film award category honoring the best non-English language motion picture
- Country: United States
- Presented by: Boston Society of Film Critics

The Boston Society of Film Critics Award for Best Foreign Language Film is one of the annual film awards given by the Boston Society of Film Critics.

== Winners ==
=== 1990s ===
Year	English title	Original title	Country	Director
1990	Mr. Hire	Monsieur Hire	France	Patrice Leconte
1991	Europa Europa	Europa Europa	Germany/France/Poland	Agnieszka Holland
1992	Raise the Red Lantern	大紅燈籠高高掛; Dà Hóng Dēnglong Gāogāo Guà	China	Zhang Yimou
1993	Farewell My Concubine	霸王別姬; Ba wang bie ji	China/Hong Kong	Chen Kaige
1994	Three Colours: Red	Trois couleurs: Rouge	France/Poland	Krzysztof Kieślowski
1995	Mina Tannenbaum		France	Martine Dugowson
1996	My Favorite Season	Ma saison préférée	France	André Téchiné
1997	Underground	Serbo-Croatian: Podzemlje; Serbian Cyrillic: Подземље	Yugoslavia/France/Germany	Emir Kusturica
1998	A Taste of Cherry	طعم گيلاس; Ta'm-e gīlās	France/Iran	Abbas Kiarostami
1999	All About My Mother	Todo sobre mi madre	Spain	Pedro Almodóvar

=== 2000s ===
Year	English title	Original title	Country	Director
2000	Crouching Tiger, Hidden Dragon	臥虎藏龍; Wo hu cang long	Taiwan	Ang Lee
2001	Love's a Bitch	Amores perros	Mexico	Alejandro González Iñárritu
2002	And Your Mother Too	Y tu mamá también	Mexico	Alfonso Cuarón
2003	The Triplets of Belleville	Les triplettes de Belleville	Belgium/Canada/France	Sylvain Chomet
2004	House of Flying Daggers	十面埋伏; Shi mian mai fu	China/Hong Kong	Zhang Yimou
2005	Kung Fu Hustle	功夫; Kung fu	China/Hong Kong	Stephen Chow
2006	Pan's Labyrinth	El laberinto del fauno	Mexico/Spain/USA	Guillermo del Toro
2007	The Diving Bell and the Butterfly	Le scaphandre et le papillon	France/USA	Julian Schnabel
2008	Let the Right One In	Låt den rätte komma in	Sweden	Tomas Alfredson
2009	Summer Hours	L'heure d'été	France	Olivier Assayas

=== 2010s ===
Year	English title	Original title	Country	Director
2010	Mother	마더; Madeo	South Korea	Bong Joon-ho
2011	Incendies	Incendies	Canada	Denis Villeneuve
2012	Amour	Amour	Austria/France/Germany	Michael Haneke
2013	The Great Beauty	La grande bellezza	Italy	Paolo Sorrentino
2014	Two Days, One Night	Deux jours, une nuit	Belgium	The Dardenne Brothers
2015	The Look of Silence	Senyap	Denmark/Indonesia	Joshua Oppenheimer
2016	The Handmaiden	Agassi	South Korea	Park Chan-wook
2017	The Square		Sweden	Ruben Östlund
2018	Shoplifters	万引き家族 (Manbiki Kazoku)	Japan	Hirokazu Koreeda
2019	Parasite	기생충 (Gisaengchung)	South Korea	Bong Joon-ho

=== 2020s ===
- La Llorona - Guatemala - Jayro Bustamante
- The Zone of Interest - United Kingdom - Jonathan Glazer
- Do Not Expect Too Much from the End of the World - Romania - Radu Jude
- Sentimental Value - Norway - Joachim Trier

== See also ==
- Academy Award for Best International Feature Film
