= Ridicule (film) =

- Theatrical poster
- Directed by: Patrice Leconte
- Screenplay by: Rémi Waterhouse; Michel Fessler; Eric Vicaut
- Produced by: Frédéric Brillion; Philippe Carcassonne; Gilles Legrand; Ranvijay Patwardhan
- Starring: Charles Berling; Jean Rochefort; Fanny Ardant; Judith Godrèche
- Cinematography: Thierry Arbogast
- Music by: Antoine Duhamel
- Distributed by: PolyGram Film Distribution
- Release date: 9 May 1996
- Running time: 102 minutes
- Country: France
- Language: French
- Budget: $7.7 million
- Box office: $20 million

Ridicule (French pronunciation: [ʁidikyl]) is a 1996 French period drama film directed by Patrice Leconte and starring Charles Berling, Jean Rochefort, Fanny Ardant and Judith Godrèche. Set in the 18th century at the decadent court of Versailles, where social status can rise and fall based on one's ability to mete out witty insults and avoid ridicule oneself, the film's plot examines the social injustices of late 18th-century France, in showing the corruption and callousness of the aristocrats.

Ridicule was selected as France's submission and was nominated for the Best Foreign Language Film at the 69th Academy Awards. Ridicule also received four César Awards at the 22nd César Awards ceremony in Paris.

== Plot ==
In 18th-century France, Baron Grégoire Ponceludon de Malavoy, a young, penniless, and naive aristocrat and engineer, devises a scheme to drain the marshy region of the Dombes that is causing disease, in order to improve the lot of the peasants living there. He sets off for Versailles in order to seek the support of King Louis XVI. Along the way, he is robbed and beaten, but he is taken in by the Marquis de Bellegarde, a physician, who teaches him about wit and the court's ways. Ponceludon realizes that the court is corrupt and hollow but finds solace in Mathilde de Bellegarde, the doctor's daughter, who agrees to marry a rich old man to support her science experiments and pay off her father's debts.

Madame de Blayac, the beautiful and wealthy recent widow of Monsieur de Blayac, who was supposed to be Ponceludon's sponsor at court, cheats at a game of wits with the help of her lover, L'abbé de Vilecourt. Ponceludon notices but does not expose the cheating to the court and ruin Madame de Blayac's reputation. Blayac repays his generosity by arranging for the certification of his lineage, allowing his suit to proceed. Meanwhile, Ponceludon sees through the schemes of the court and realizes that he cannot trust anyone.

Ponceludon sleeps with Madame de Blayac in exchange for her assistance in arranging a meeting with the King, but she maliciously has Bellegarde attend her when Ponceludon is still with her, ensuring that Mathilde learns of their relationship. Later, Ponceludon joins the King's entourage and secures a private meeting with the King to discuss his project, but he is forced into a duel with a cannoneer who insults him.

Ponceludon kills the cannoneer and learns that the King cannot meet with someone who has killed one of his officers, although he is assured that it was right to uphold his honor. Madame de Blayac plots her revenge by inviting Ponceludon to a costume ball "only for wits", where he is tripped and ridiculed. However, he tears off his mask and condemns their decadence, vowing to drain the swamp by himself, and leaves the court with Mathilde.

Some years later, in 1794, after the Revolution has forced many nobles into exile, the Marquis de Bellegarde, a refugee in Great Britain, spends some time in a nostalgic conversation. He says that Ponceludon, who was always faithful, has been able to work on completing his goal of draining the Dombes alongside Mathilde, who is now his wife.

== Production team ==
- Hook: "He spares no one..."
- Director: Patrice Leconte
- Screenplay writers: Rémi Waterhouse, Michel Fessler, and Éric Vicaut
- Composer: Antoine Duhamel
- Cinematographer: Thierry Arbogast
- Set director: Ivan Maussion
- Costume director: Christian Gasc
- Editor: Joëlle Hache
- Sound: Dominique Hennequin
- Production: Gilles Legrand, Philippe Carcassonne, and Frédéric Brillion
- Production companies: Cinéa, Épithète Films, and France 3 Cinéma, with the participation of StudioCanal, Polygram Audiovisuel, Sofica Investimage 4 and CNC
- Country of production: France
- Original language: French
- Film format: 35 mm – Color
- Genre: Dramatic comedy, period piece

== Cast ==
- Charles Berling – Le Baron Grégoire Ponceludon de Malavoy
- Jean Rochefort – Le Marquis de Bellegarde
- Fanny Ardant – Madame de Blayac
- Judith Godrèche – Mathilde de Bellegarde
- Bernard Giraudeau – L'abbé de Vilecourt
- Bernard Dhéran – Monsieur de Montaliéri
- Albert Delpy – Le Baron de Guéret
- Carlo Brandt – Le Chevalier de Milletail
- Jacques Mathou – Abbé de l'Epée
- Jacques Roman – Chevernoy
- Urbain Cancelier – Louis XVI
- Bruno Zanardi – Paul, son of Charlotte
- Marie Pillet – Charlotte, the governess
- Mirabelle Kirkland – Marie Antoinette

== Filming ==
The scenes outside the residence of the Marquis de Bellegarde were shot at the Villiers-le-Bâcle château, property of the comedian Yves Lecoq.

Other locations:

- Château de Neuville (Yvelines)
- Château de Champs-sur-Marne (Seine-et-Marne)
- Gardens of the Château de Versailles (Yvelines)

== Reception ==
=== Critical response ===
Ridicule has an approval rating of 80% on review aggregator website Rotten Tomatoes, based on 20 reviews, and an average rating of 7.3/10. Metacritic assigned the film a weighted average score of 80 out of 100, based on 20 critics, indicating "generally favourable reviews".

=== Box office ===
The film grossed around $10 million in France. Miramax acquired US distribution rights and released 50 subtitled copies of the film which grossed almost $2 million.

=== Awards ===
==== Won ====
- César 1997
  - César Award for Best Film
  - César Award for Best Director – Patrice Leconte
  - César Award for Best Costume Design – Christian Gasc
  - César Award for Best Production Design – Ivan Maussion
- Lumières 1997
  - Best Film
  - Best Actress – Fanny Ardant
  - Best Actor – Charles Berling
- BAFTA Award for Best Film not in the English Language
- David di Donatello for Best Foreign Film
- London Film Critics Circle Awards 1997 (en): Best Film not in the English Language

==== Nominations ====
- César Award for Best Actor – Charles Berling
- César Award for Best Actor in a Supporting Role – Bernard Giraudeau, Jean Rochefort
- César Award for Best Original Screenplay or Adaptation – Remi Waterhouse
- César Award for Best Music – Antoine Duhamel
- César Award for Best Cinematography – Thierry Arbogast
- César Award for Best Sound – Dominique Hennequin, Jean Goudier
- César Award for Best Editing – Joëlle Hache
- Academy Award for Best Foreign Language Film
- Cannes Film Festival – Palme d'Or
- Boston Society of Film Critics Awards 1996: Best Film not in the English Language
- Satellite Awards 1997: Best Film not in the English Language
- Golden Globes 1997: Best Film not in the English Language

== Historical context ==
Ridicule demonstrates life at the heart of the 18th century, where the only way to have an audience with the king was by using wit, or using intelligence and beautiful language. Rivalry is always present in the court, the nobles humiliate each other in the hope of lifting their status in front of the king. One of the characters in the film even goes so far as to kill himself because he believes he has been ridiculed out of a meeting with the king. The king appears to be like a god, inaccessible and ruthless, selfish and capable of driving men to death, without even realizing it. The heroes of Ridicule, the Baron de Malavoy, although a stranger to this atmosphere, is obligated to enter there to be able to address the king, so that he can obtain the funds necessary to dry the marshes of the Dombes. He discovers very quickly that he has a gift for wit, but will not succeed however in obtaining a true conversation with the king.

Historically speaking, the film is intended to be close to the descriptions historians have of the Court under the Ancien Régime, although it evokes more so the ways of the Court of Louis XIV than those of Louis XVI: the Count of Bussy-Rabutin describes in his memoirs the beginning of the reign of Louis XIV, the inaccessible aspect of the sovereign, and the extreme difficulty he has in getting messages to the king, even though he comes from one of the oldest and most influential families in the kingdom.

The Duke of Saint-Simon, for his part, recounts in his memoirs his embassy to Spain for the engagement of Louis XV and the Infanta Mariana Victoria of Spain in 1720, and appreciates the weekly sessions where the King of Spain receives any applicant, unlike what happens in France. We can also cite the testimony of Norbert Elias who describes the phenomenon of the Court in which Louis XV, but especially Louis XVI (who sought to escape this environment by taking refuge on the roofs or by practicing manual trades), allowed themselves to be locked up. The king became almost inaccessible, unlike Henry IV (1589-1610), who traveled all over France and slept in modest inns. At court, verbal witticisms circulated regularly and were learned and used (Rothschild Sotheby's sale in May 2006, the personal copy of the Marquis de Marigny, brother of the Marquise de Pompadour).

However, if the costumes seem consistent with the descriptions of the time, see for example the festive book entitled "The Marriage of the Dauphin" – son of Louis XV – the film takes some liberties, in particular for the scene of the Autumn Ball and depicts Louis XVI and Marie-Antoinette in particular rather grotesquely.

== See also ==
- List of submissions to the 69th Academy Awards for Best Foreign Language Film
- List of French submissions for the Academy Award for Best Foreign Language Film
- List of films featuring the deaf and hard of hearing
