= Madeline Fontaine =

French costume designer

Madeline Fontaine is a French costume designer.

== Partial filmography ==
=== Film ===
Year	Title	Director	Notes
1983	One Deadly Summer	Jean Becker	Costumer
1984	Le matelot 512	René Allio	Costumer
1986	Jean de Florette	Claude Berri	Costumer
1986	Manon of the Spring	Claude Berri	Costumer
1991	La neige et le feu	Claude Pinoteau	
1994	Prince of Jutland	Gabriel Axel	Wardrobe master
1995	The City of Lost Children	Marc Caro; Jean-Pierre Jeunet	Head costumer
1996	A Saturday on Earth	Diane Bertrand	
1998	Let There Be Light	Arthur Joffé	
1999	Babel	Gérard Pullicino	
1999	Kennedy et moi	Sam Karmann	
2001	Amélie	Jean-Pierre Jeunet	
2002	Almost Peaceful	Michel Deville	
2003	Le Ventre de Juliette	Martin Provost	
2003	Leave Your Hands on My Hips	Chantal Lauby	
2004	A Very Long Engagement	Jean-Pierre Jeunet	
2005	The Art of Breaking Up	Michel Deville	
2008	Asterix at the Olympic Games	Frédéric Forestier; Thomas Langmann	
2008	Cash	Eric Besnard	
2008	Séraphine	Martin Provost	
2009	Micmacs	Jean-Pierre Jeunet	
2011	Chicken with Plums	Marjane Satrapi; Vincent Paronnaud	
2012	Déjà Vu	Wong Kar-wai	Short film and advertisement for Chivas Regal
2012	Camille Rewinds	Noémie Lvovsky	
2012	Mes héros	Eric Besnard	
2013	Violette	Martin Provost	
2013	The Young and Prodigious T. S. Spivet	Jean-Pierre Jeunet	
2014	Yves Saint Laurent	Jalil Lespert	
2016	A Woman's Life	Stéphane Brizé	
2016	Jackie	Pablo Larraín	
2018	The White Crow	Ralph Fiennes	
2020	How to Be a Good Wife	Martin Provost	
2021	Delicious	Eric Besnard	
2021	The Cursed	Sean Ellis	
2022	Bigbug	Jean-Pierre Jeunet	
2023	Asterix & Obelix: The Middle Kingdom	Guillaume Canet	
2023	The Edge of the Blade	Vincent Perez	

=== Television ===
Year	Title	Notes
1990	The Phantom of the Opera	Costumer; 2 episodes
2015–2018	Versailles	30 episodes
2022	Marie Antoinette	Costume artistic director 8 episodes

== Awards and nominations ==
Association	Year (Note: Indicates the year of ceremony. Each year is linked to the article about the awards held that year, wherever possible.)	Category	Work	Result
Academy Awards	2017	Best Costume Design	Jackie	Nominated
British Academy Film Awards	2017	Best Costume Design	Jackie	Won
César Awards	2002	Best Costume Design	Amélie	Nominated
César Awards	2005	Best Costume Design	A Very Long Engagement	Won
César Awards	2009	Best Costume Design	Séraphine	Won
César Awards	2010	Best Costume Design	Micmacs à tire-larigot	Nominated
César Awards	2013	Best Costume Design	Camille Rewinds	Nominated
César Awards	2014	Best Costume Design	The Young and Prodigious T.S. Spivet	Nominated
César Awards	2015	Best Costume Design	Yves Saint Laurent	Nominated
César Awards	2017	Best Costume Design	A Woman's Life	Nominated
César Awards	2021	Best Costume Design	How to Be a Good Wife	Won
César Awards	2022	Best Costume Design	Delicious	Nominated
Costume Designers Guild Awards	2017	Excellence in Period Film	Jackie	Nominated
Critics' Choice Awards	2016	Best Costume Design	Jackie	Won
Las Vegas Film Critics Society Awards	2016	Best Costume Design	Jackie	Nominated
Phoenix Film Critics Society Awards	2016	Best Costume Design	Jackie	Nominated
San Diego Film Critics Society Awards	2016	Best Costume Design	Jackie	Runner-up
Satellite Awards	2017	Best Costume Design	Jackie	Won
Seattle Film Critics Society Awards	2017	Best Costume Design	Jackie	Nominated
