= 2016 Seattle Film Critics Society Awards =

Annual US film awards ceremony

1st Seattle Film Critics Society Awards
- Date: January 5, 2017
- Site: Seattle, Washington

Highlights
- Best Picture: Moonlight
- Most awards: Moonlight (6)
- Most nominations: La La Land / Moonlight (10)

The 1st Seattle Film Critics Society Awards were announced on January 5, 2017.

The nominations were announced on December 21, 2016.

== Winners and nominees ==
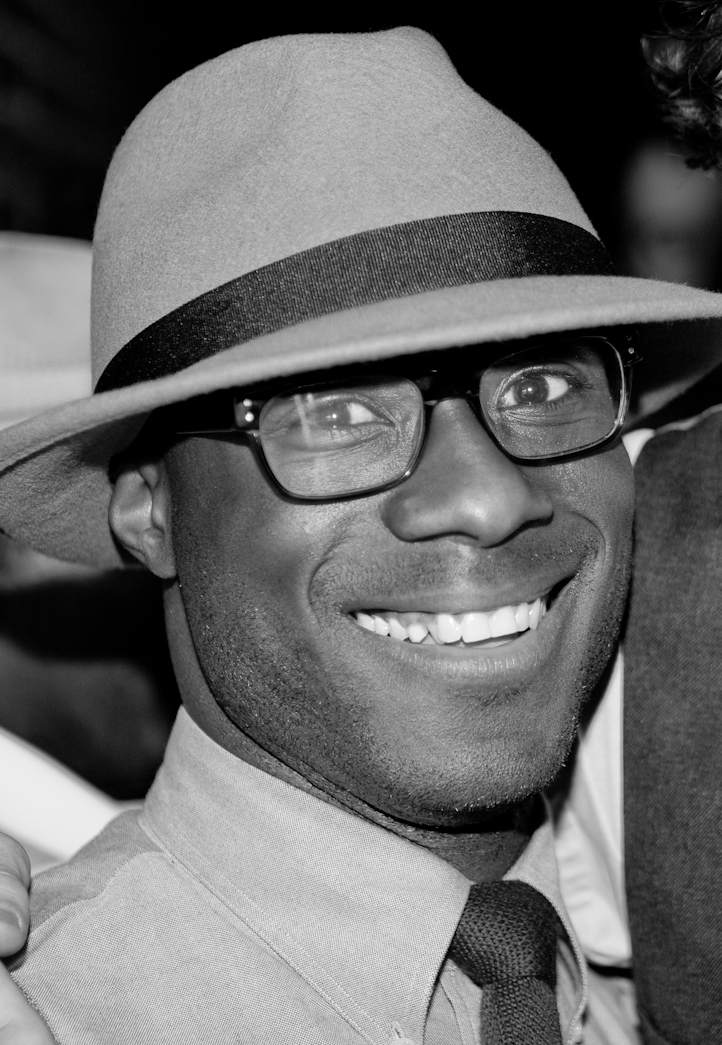
Barry Jenkins, Best Director winner and Best Screenplay co-winner

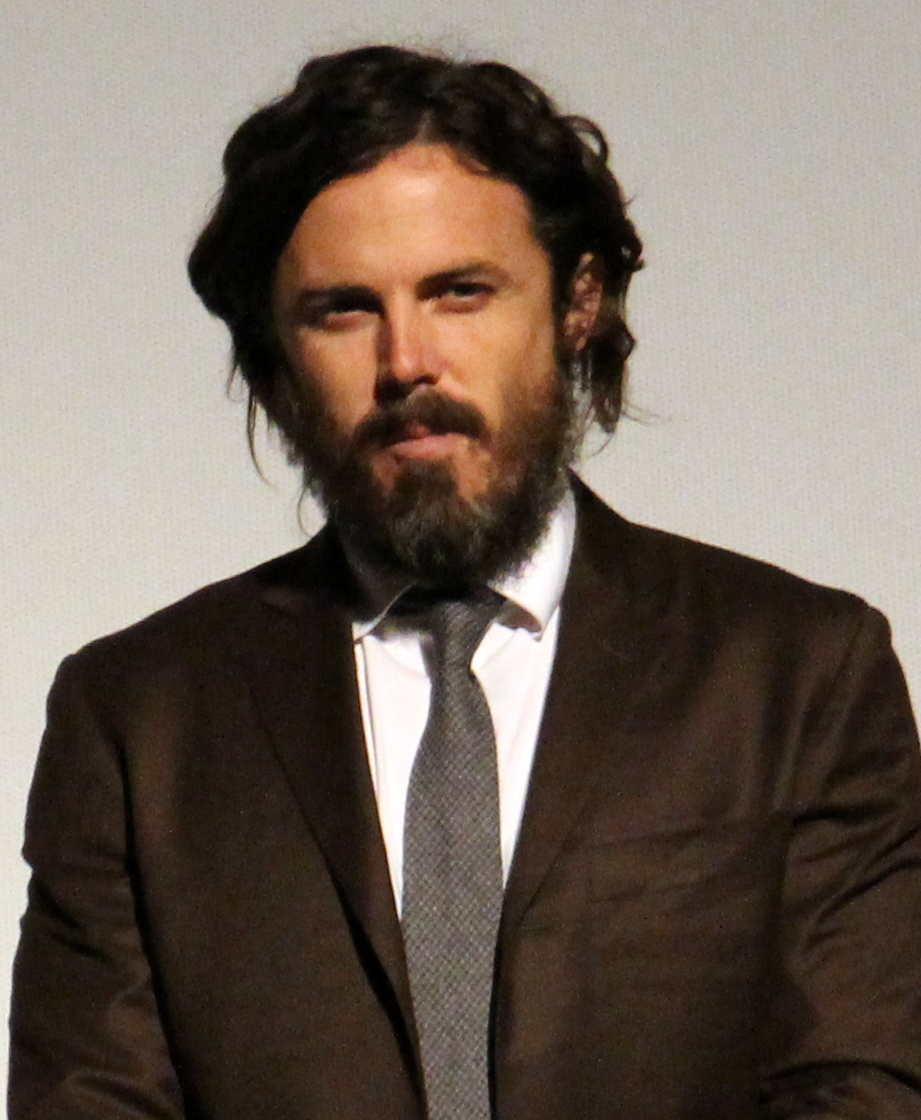
Casey Affleck, Best Actor in a Leading Role winner

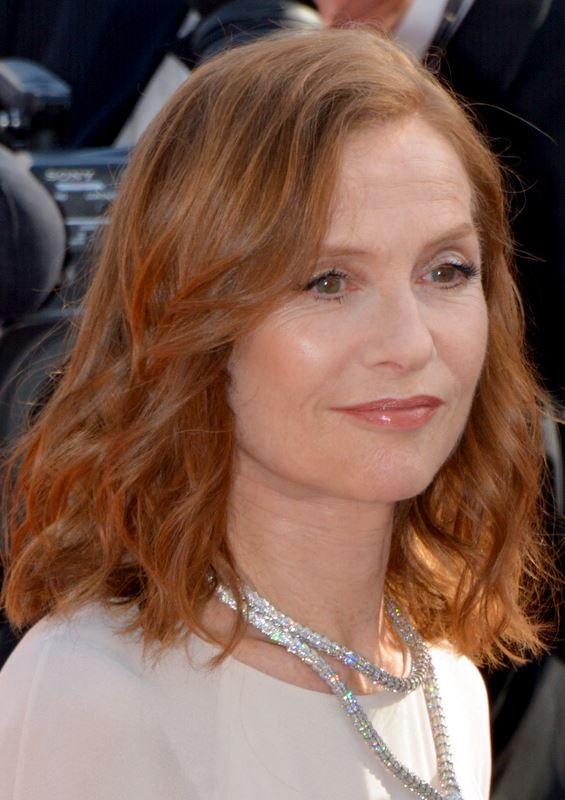
Isabelle Huppert, Best Actress in a Leading Role winner

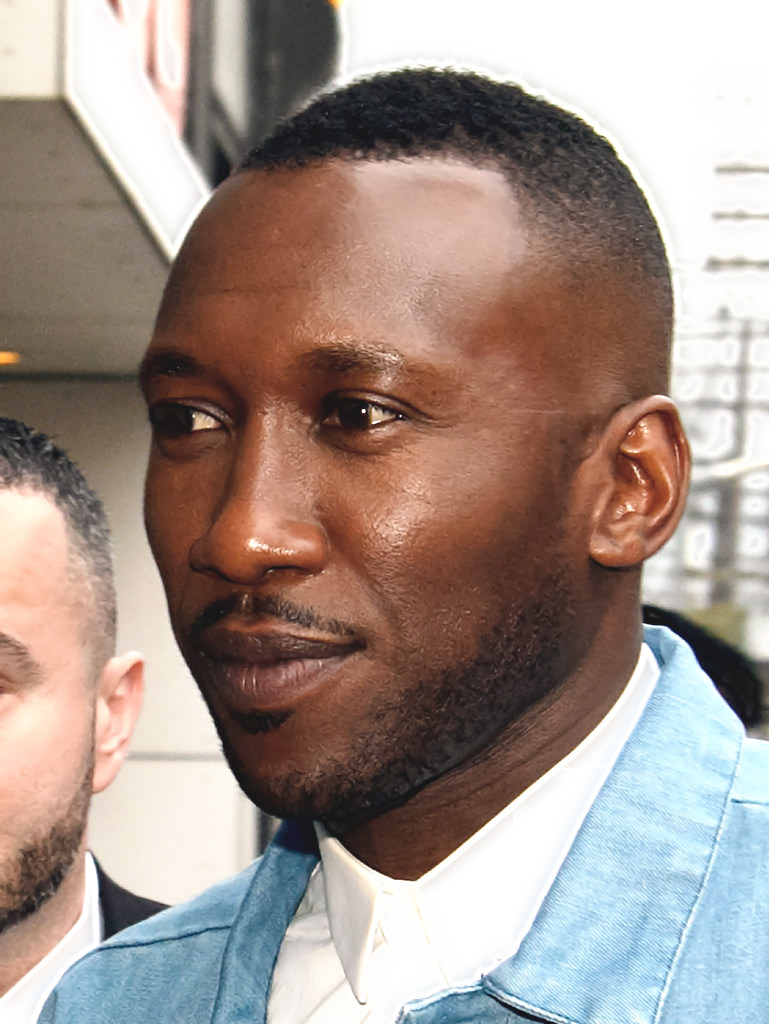
Mahershala Ali, Best Actor in a Supporting Role winner

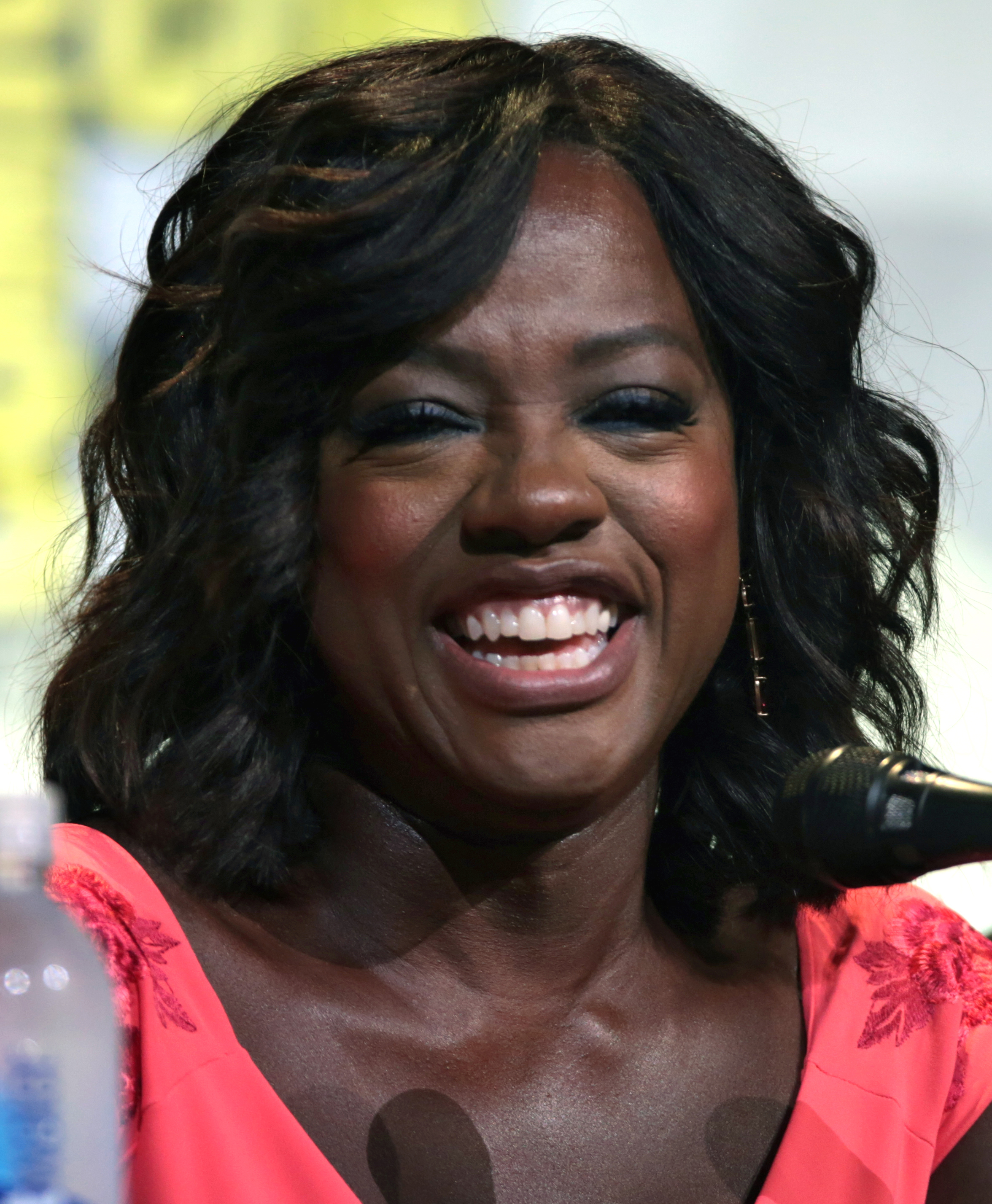
Viola Davis, Best Actress in a Supporting Role winner

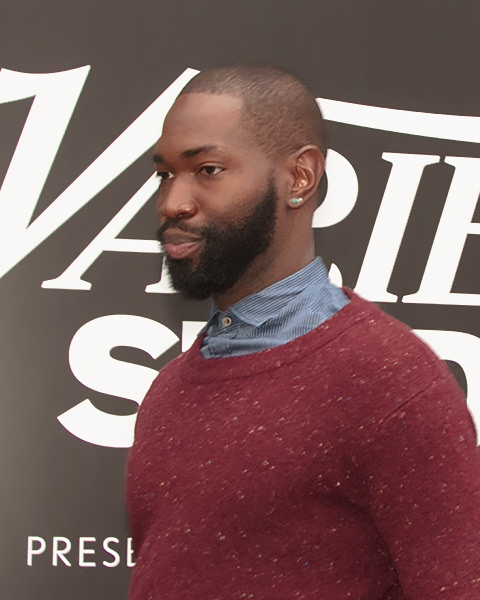
Tarell Alvin McCraney, Best Screenplay co-winner

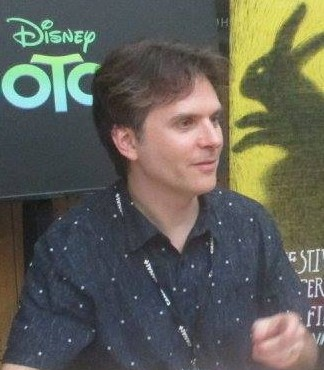
Byron Howard, Best Animated Feature co-winner

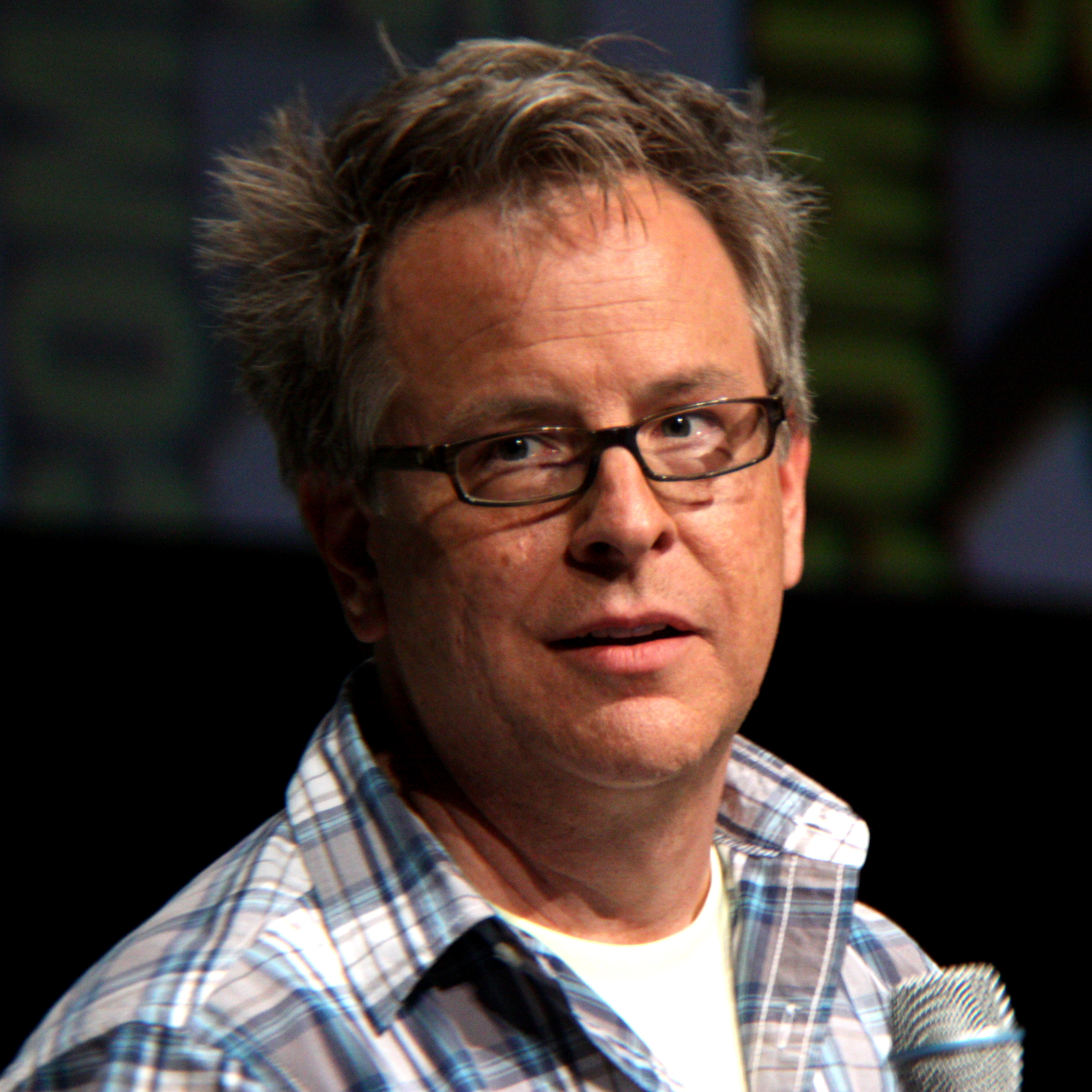
Rich Moore, Best Animated Feature co-winner

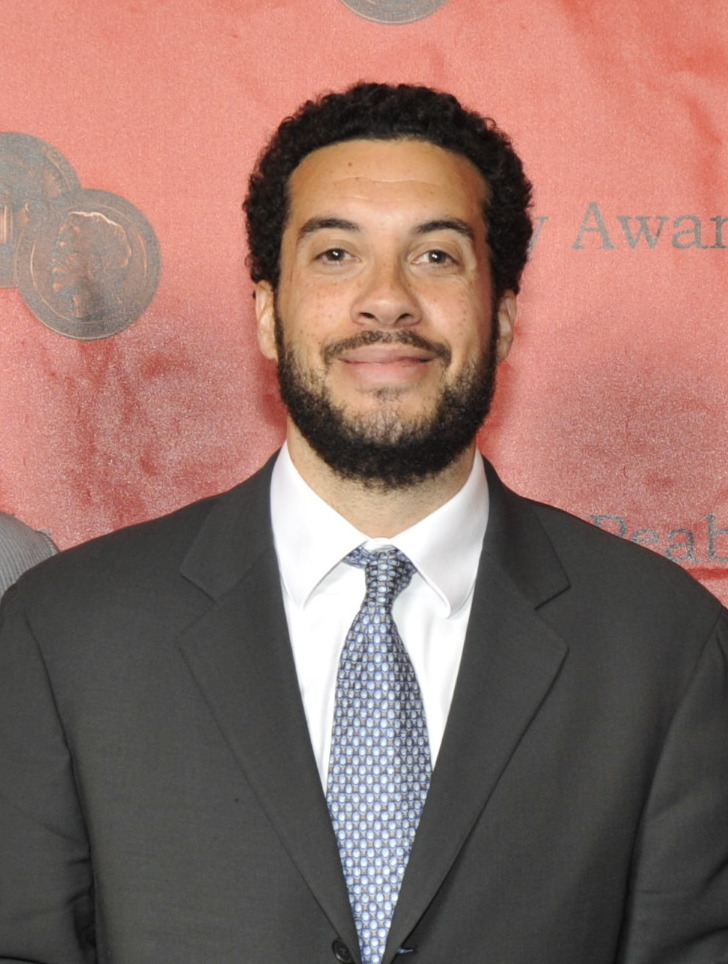
Ezra Edelman, Best Documentary Feature winner

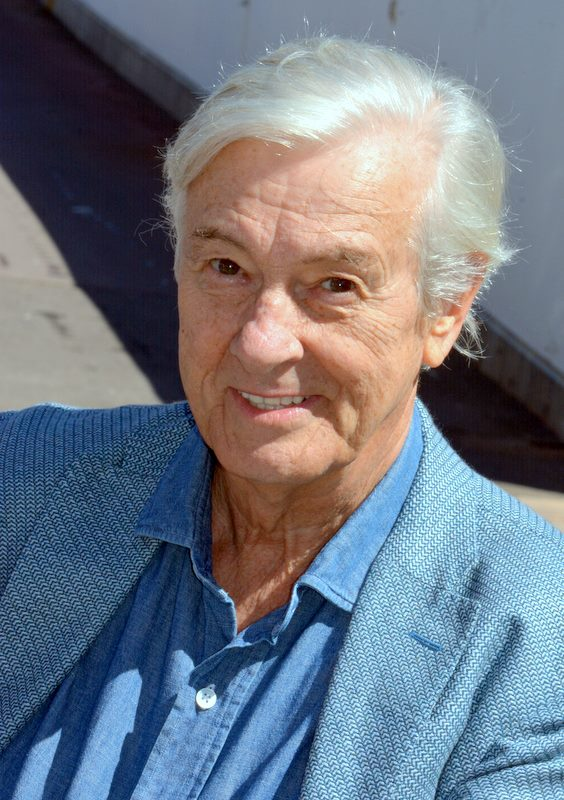
Paul Verhoeven, Best Foreign Language Film winner

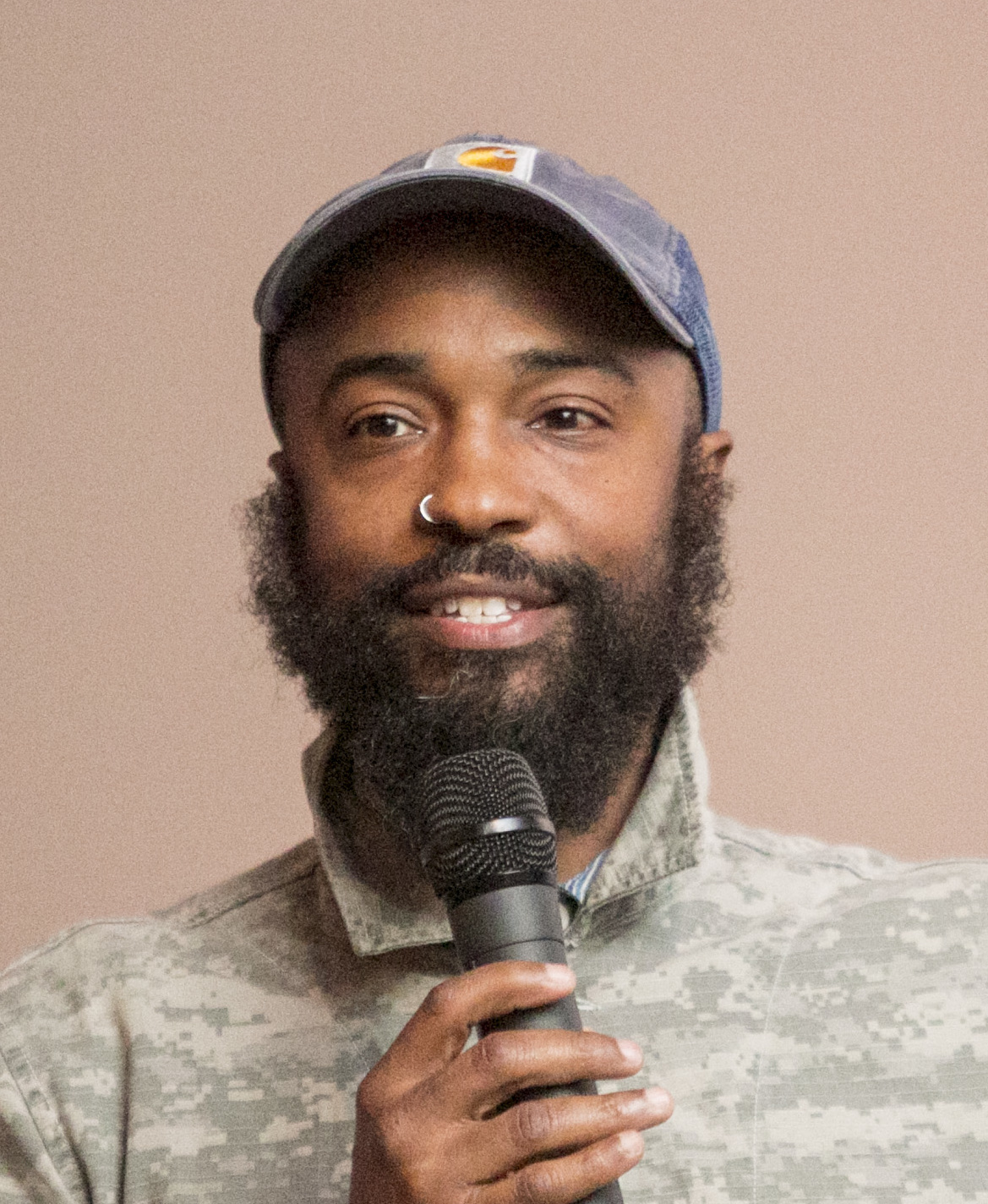
Bradford Young, Best Cinematography winner

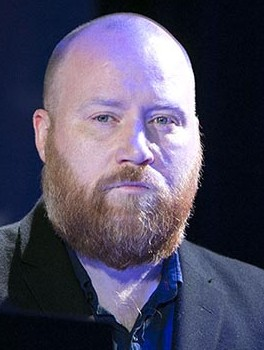
Jóhann Jóhannsson, Best Original Score winner

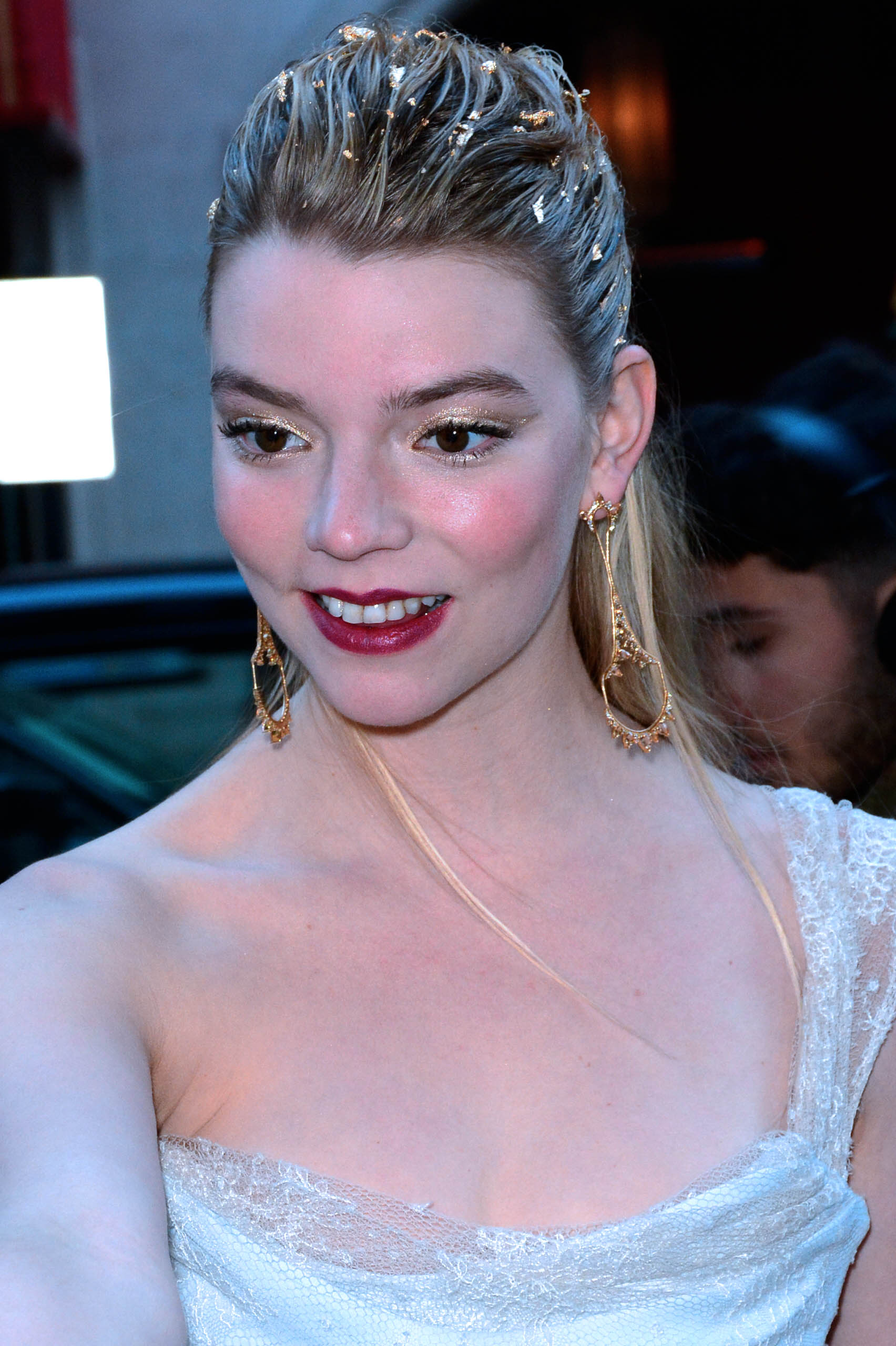
Anya Taylor-Joy, Best Youth Performance winner

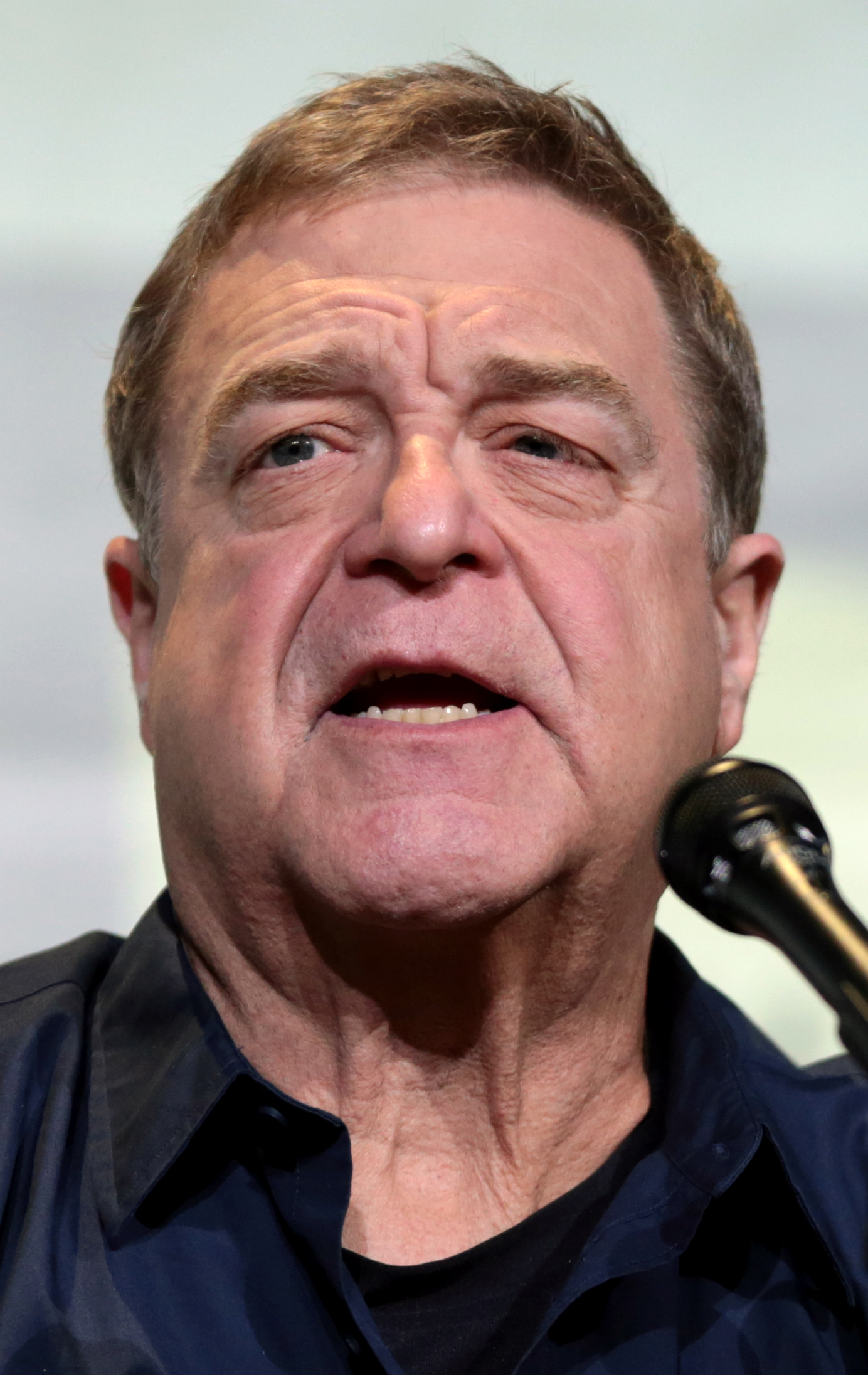
John Goodman, Best Villain winner

Best Picture of the Year Moonlight: 13th; Arrival; Elle; The Handmaiden; Hell or High Water; Jackie; La La Land; Manchester by the Sea; The Witch	Best Director Barry Jenkins – Moonlight: Damien Chazelle – La La Land; Robert Eggers – The Witch; Paul Verhoeven – Elle; Denis Villeneuve – Arrival
Best Actor in a Leading Role Casey Affleck – Manchester by the Sea as Lee Chandler: Ryan Gosling – La La Land as Sebastian Wilder; Logan Lerman – Indignation as Marcus Messner; Viggo Mortensen – Captain Fantastic as Ben Cash; Denzel Washington – Fences as Troy Maxson	Best Actress in a Leading Role Isabelle Huppert – Elle as Michèle Leblanc: Amy Adams – Arrival as Dr. Louise Banks; Kate Beckinsale – Love & Friendship as Lady Susan Vernon; Natalie Portman – Jackie as Jackie Kennedy; Emma Stone – La La Land as Mia Dolan
Best Actor in a Supporting Role Mahershala Ali – Moonlight as Juan: Jeff Bridges – Hell or High Water as Marcus Hamilton; Kyle Chandler – Manchester by the Sea as Joseph Chandler; John Goodman – 10 Cloverfield Lane as Howard Stambler; Lucas Hedges – Manchester by the Sea as Patrick Chandler	Best Actress in a Supporting Role Viola Davis – Fences as Rose Maxson: Lily Gladstone – Certain Women as Jamie / The Rancher; Naomie Harris – Moonlight as Paula; Kate McKinnon – Ghostbusters as Dr. Jillian Holtzmann; Michelle Williams – Manchester by the Sea as Randi Chandler
Best Ensemble Cast Moonlight: Captain Fantastic; Fences; Hell or High Water; Manchester by the Sea	Best Screenplay Moonlight – Barry Jenkins and Tarell Alvin McCraney: Arrival – Eric Heisserer; Hell or High Water – Taylor Sheridan; La La Land – Damien Chazelle; Manchester by the Sea – Kenneth Lonergan
Best Animated Feature Zootopia – Byron Howard, Rich Moore, and Jared Bush: Finding Dory – Andrew Stanton and Angus MacLane; Kubo and the Two Strings – Travis Knight; Moana – Ron Clements and John Musker; Tower – Keith Maitland	Best Documentary Feature O.J.: Made in America – Ezra Edelman: 13th – Ava DuVernay; Cameraperson – Kirsten Johnson; Tickled – David Farrier and Dylan Reeve; Weiner – Josh Kriegman and Elyse Steinberg
Best Foreign Language Film Elle – Paul Verhoeven: The Handmaiden – Park Chan-wook; The Innocents – Anne Fontaine; Under the Shadow – Babak Anvari; The Wailing – Na Hong-jin	Best Cinematography Arrival – Bradford Young: Jackie – Stéphane Fontaine; La La Land – Linus Sandgren; Moonlight – James Laxton; The Witch – Jarin Blaschke
Best Costume Design The Handmaiden – Cho Sang-kyung: Jackie – Madeline Fontaine; La La Land – Mary Zophres; Love & Friendship – Eimer Ní Mhaoldomhnaigh; The Witch – Linda Muir	Best Film Editing Moonlight – Nat Sanders and Joi McMillon: Arrival – Joe Walker; Cameraperson – Nels Bangerter; Hell or High Water – Jake Roberts; La La Land – Tom Cross
Best Original Score Arrival – Jóhann Jóhannsson: Jackie – Mica Levi; La La Land – Justin Hurwitz; Moonlight – Nicholas Britell; Swiss Army Man – Andy Hull and Robert McDowell	Best Production Design The Handmaiden – Ryu Seong-hee: Arrival – Patrice Vermette (Production Design); Paul Hotte (Set Decoration); Jackie – Jean Rabasse (Production Design); Véronique Melery (Set Decoration); La La Land – David Wasco (Production Design); Sandy Reynolds-Wasco (Set Decoration); Rogue One: A Star Wars Story – Doug Chiang and Neil Lamont (Production Design); Lee Sandales (Set Decoration)
Best Visual Effects Arrival – Louis Morin (TIE); Doctor Strange – Stephane Ceretti, Paul Corbould, Richard Bluff, and Vincent Cirelli (TIE): Captain America: Civil War – Dan DeLeeuw, Dan Sudick, Russell Earl, and Greg Steele; The Jungle Book – Robert Legato, Andrew R. Jones, Adam Valdez, and Dan Lemmon; Rogue One: A Star Wars Story – John Knoll, Mohen Leo, Hal Hickel, and Neil Corbould	Best Youth Performance Anya Taylor-Joy – The Witch as Thomasin: Alex Hibbert – Moonlight as Child Chiron / "Little"; Royalty Hightower – The Fits as Toni; Sunny Pawar – Lion as Saroo Brierley; Harvey Scrimshaw – The Witch as Caleb
Best Villain Howard Stambler – 10 Cloverfield Lane (portrayed by John Goodman): Darcy Banker – Green Room (portrayed by Patrick Stewart); Orson Krennic – Rogue One: A Star Wars Story (portrayed by Ben Mendelsohn); Norman Nordstrom (a.k.a. "The Blind Man") – Don't Breathe (portrayed by Stephen Lang); Black Phillip – The Witch (portrayed by Charlie and voiced by Wahab Chaudhry)

Films that received multiple nominations
Nominations	Film
10	La La Land
10	Moonlight
9	Arrival
7	Manchester by the Sea
7	The Witch
6	Jackie
5	Hell or High Water
4	Elle
4	The Handmaiden
3	Fences
3	Rogue One: A Star Wars Story
2	10 Cloverfield Lane
2	13th
2	Captain Fantastic
2	Love & Friendship

Films that received multiple awards
Awards	Film
6	Moonlight
3	Arrival
2	Elle
2	The Handmaiden
