= Laurent Seksik =

French physicist, journalist and writer

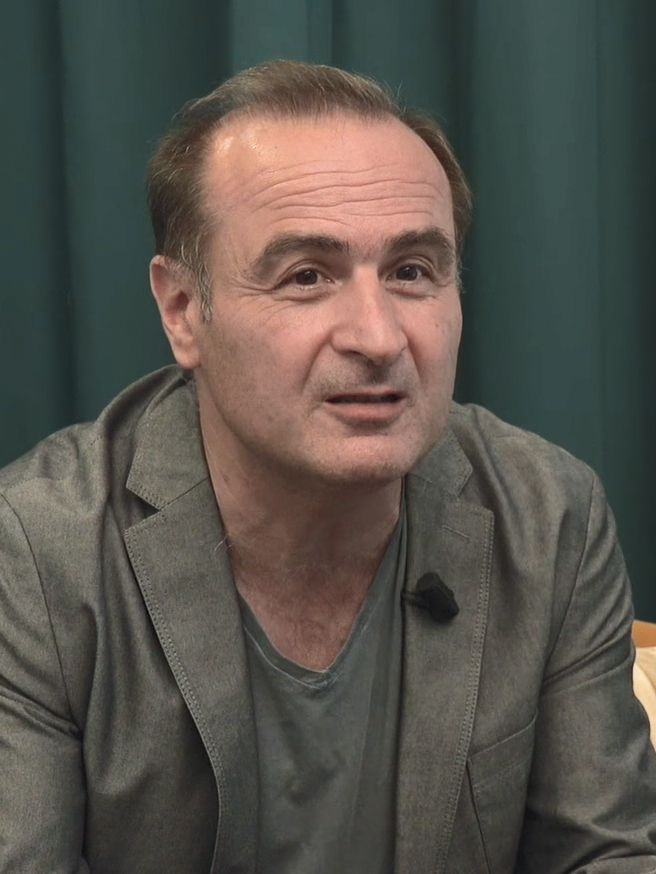
- Laurent Seksik (2018)
- Born: 1962 (age 63–64); Nice
- Occupation: Writer
- Writing career
- Genre: Historical novels
- Notable work: Les derniers jours de Stefan Zweig

Laurent Seksik (born Nice, 1962) is a French writer. A practising doctor, he published his first novel in 1999. He is best known for his trilogy of historical novels: Les derniers jours de Stefan Zweig, Le cas Eduard Einstein and Romain Gary s'en va-t-en guerre. He has also published a biography of Albert Einstein. The Last Days of Stefan Zweig has been adapted for stage and screen, and has been translated into English by Andre Naffis Sahely.
