= Man Is a Woman =

- Original film poster
- Directed by: Jean-Jacques Zilbermann
- Written by: Gilles Taurand; Jean-Jacques Zilbermann (screenplay & story); Joële Van Effenterre (story)
- Produced by: Régine Konckier; Jean-Luc Ormières
- Starring: Antoine de Caunes; Elsa Zylberstein
- Cinematography: Pierre Aïm
- Edited by: Monica Coleman
- Music by: Giora Feidman
- Distributed by: PolyGram Film Distribution
- Release date: 1998
- Running time: 100 min
- Country: France
- Language: French / Yiddish / English
- Budget: $4.1 million
- Box office: $3.8 million

Man Is a Woman (French title: L'homme est une femme comme les autres) is a 1998 French film directed by Jean-Jacques Zilbermann.

== Synopsis ==
Simon Eskanazy is a thirty-year-old gay musician. Born into a Jewish family, he took great pains to accept his homosexuality, and to get his family (including his mother and his uncle, Salomon) to do the same. The latter, Uncle Salomon is a wealthy banker who offered him a deal: he'll give him 10 million francs and will bequeath his mansion to Simon only if Simon agrees to marry a woman. First reluctant, he met Rosalie Baumann, a Jewish singer known for singing in Yiddish, she is very observant, and her parents live in the United States. Little by little, while getting to know her, Simon falls in love with her.

== Cast ==
- Antoine de Caunes: Simon Eskanazy
- Elsa Zylberstein : Rosalie Baumann
- Michel Aumont : Salomon Eskanazy
- Gad Elmaleh : David Applebaum
- Maurice Bénichou : Mordechai Baumann
- Catherine Hiegel: Hannah Baumann
- Judith Magre : Simon's mother
- Stéphane Metzger: Daniel Baumann
- Andrée Damant : Bank employee
