= Olivier Bériot =

French costume designer

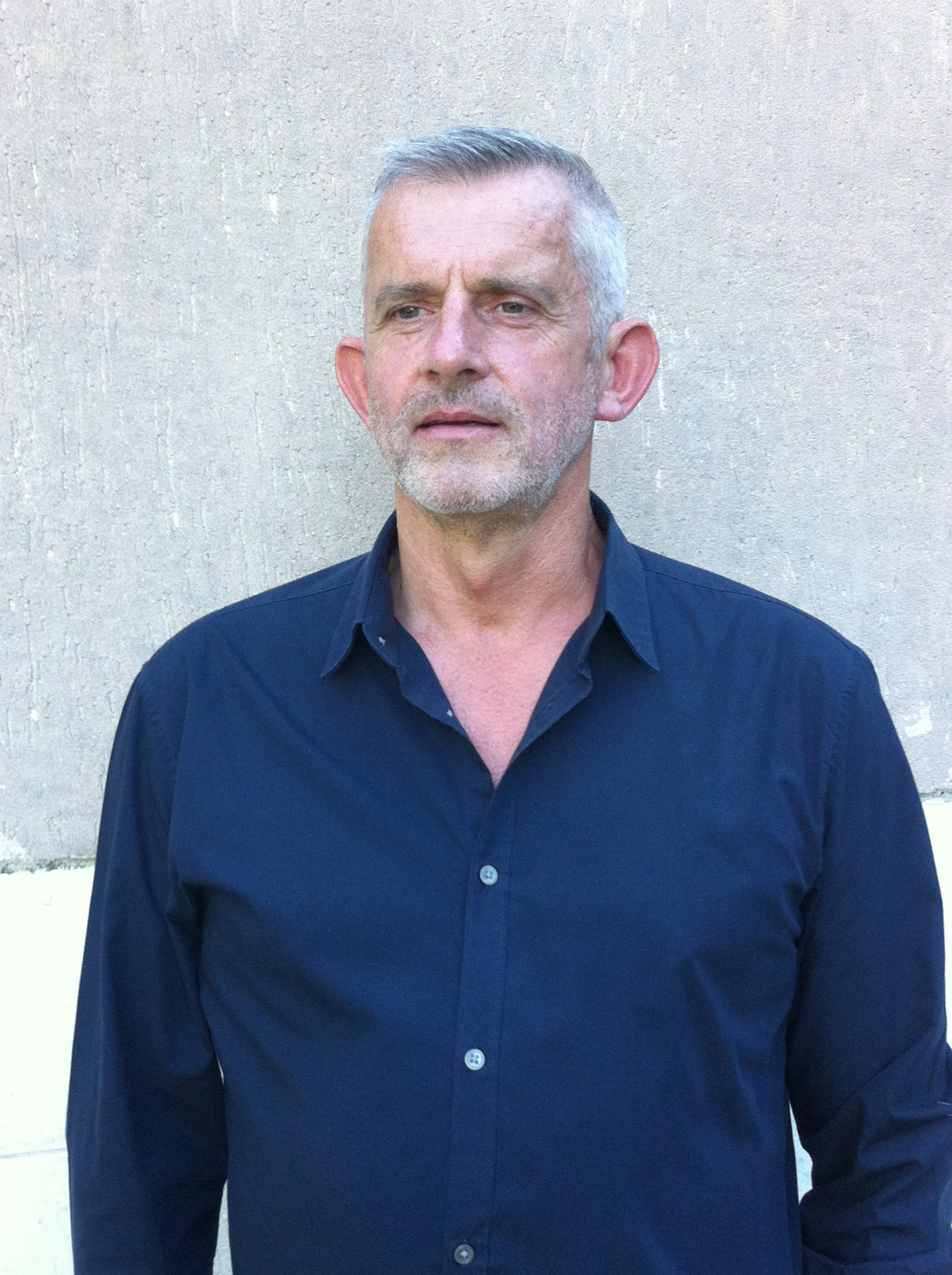
Image of Olivier Beriot

Olivier Bériot is a French costume designer.

== Awards ==
He was head costume designer for the opening and closing ceremonies of the 2024 Summer Olympics and the 2024 Summer Paralympics. He received César Award nominations for Best Costumes in 2011 for The Extraordinary Adventures of Adèle Blanc-Sec and in 2014 for Me, Myself and Mum.
