= Jacqueline Moreau =

French ballerina and ballet teacher

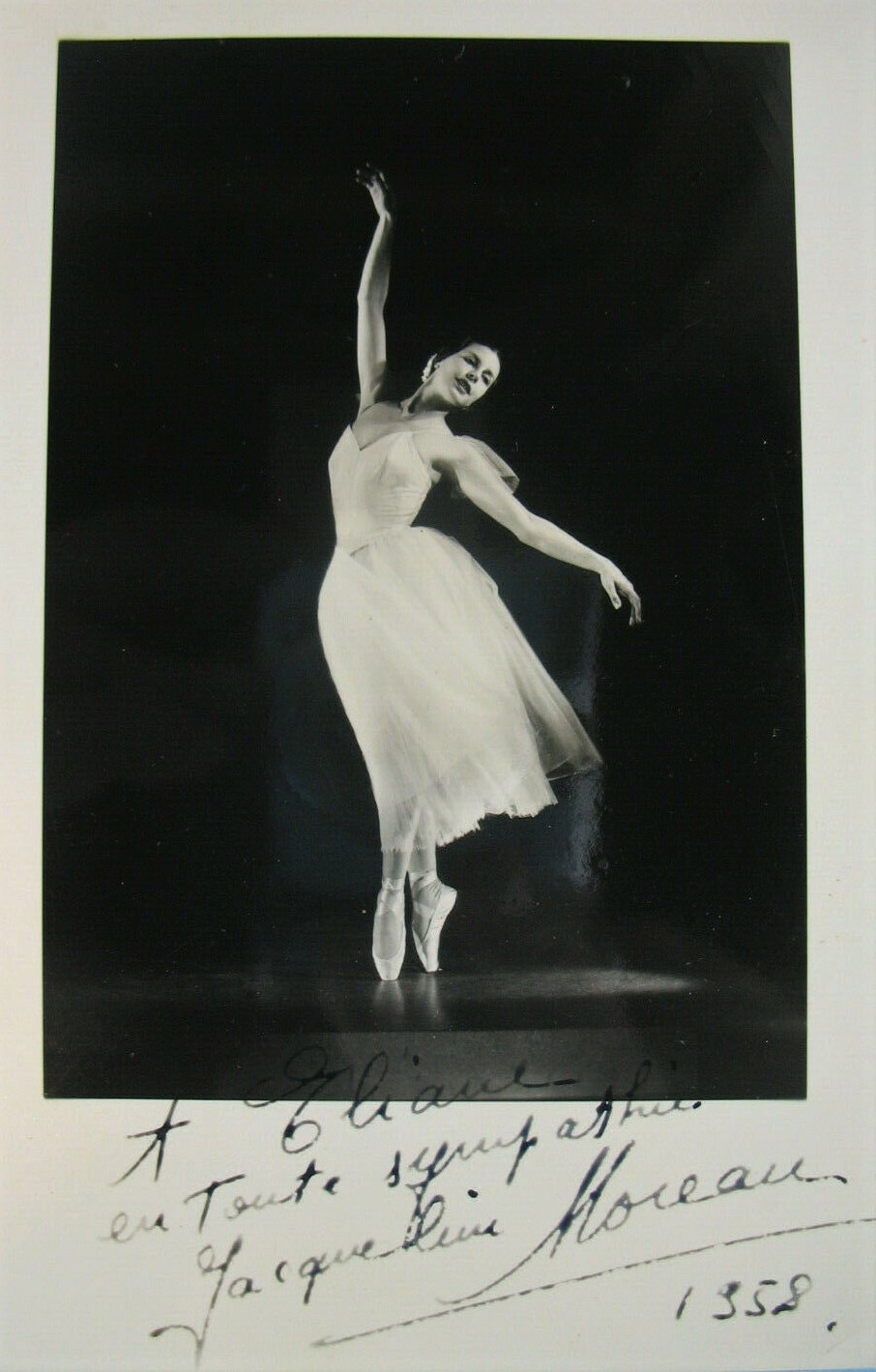
Jacqueline Moreau (c. 1958)

Jacqueline Moreau (1926–2018) was a French ballerina and ballet teacher. From the age of nine, she attended the Paris Opera Ballet School, training under Carlotta Zambelli. She performed with the Paris Opera Ballet from 1942, soon gaining the rank of première danseuse but left in 1951 when she realized she would not be ranked a danseuse étoile. From 1953 to 1959, she was a star performer at the International Ballet of the Marquis de Cuevas based in Monte-Carlo. For the remainder of her career, she taught first at the Paris Opera Ballet School and then at the Boulogne-Billancourt Conservatory until her retirement in 1990.

== Early life ==
Born on 7 May 1926 at Bandol in the Var department, Jacqueline Moreau became a pupil at the Paris Opera Ballet School when she was nine, training under Carlotta Zambelli and Albert Aveline.

== Career ==
In 1942, Moreau joined the Paris Opera's corps de ballet, gaining the rank of première danseuse in 1946. During the next five years, she took on many of the roles performed by Solange Schwarz (1910–2000). an étoile who had just left the company. In particular, she performed the Danse de l'Éphémère in Albert Aveline's Le Festin de l’araignée, the hen in Serge Lifar's Les Animaux modèles as well as la Cigarette in his Suite en Blanc, and the role of Caliope in George Balanchine's Apollon Musagète.

Upset at the limited prospects of ever becoming an étoile, she left the Opera Ballet in 1951 and joined the Ballets des Champs-Élysées where she successfully created Léonore in Ruth Page's Revenge. From 1953, she spent eight years with the ballet company of George de Cuevas which was based in Monte-Carlo. She danced internationally in the company's classical repertoire which included Giselle, Swan Lake, Sleeping Beauty and Les Sylphides.

After teaching at the Paris Opera School and the Boulogne-Billancourt Conservatory until her retirement in 1990, Jacqueline Moreau died on 8 November 2018, aged 92.
