= Corinne Jorry =

French costume designer

- Born: 23 April 1943 (age 83)
- Occupation: costume designer
- Years active: 1974-2009

Corinne Jorry (born 23 April 1943) is a French costume designer. She was nominated four times for the César Award for Best Costume Design, winning for her work on the film All the World's Mornings (1991). She was also nominated for the Academy Award for Best Costume Design for her work on Madame Bovary (1991).
