= Charlotte David =

Wife of the painter Jacques-Louis David

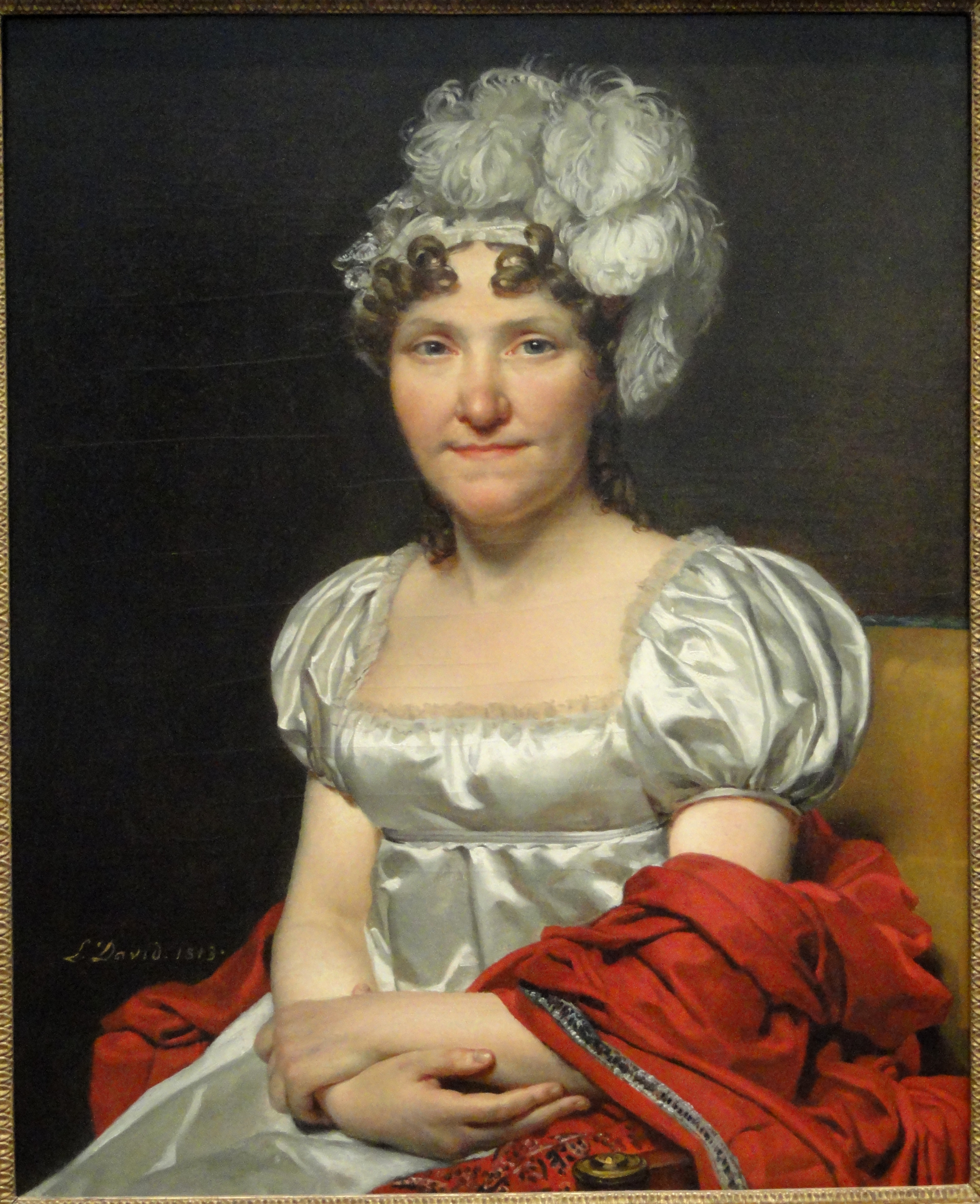
- Portrait by her husband in 1813, collection of the National Gallery of Art
- Born: Marguerite-Charlotte Pécoul; 29 November 1764; Paris
- Died: 9 May 1826 (aged 61); Paris
- Resting place: Père Lachaise Cemetery, Paris
- Spouse: Jacques-Louis David (m. 1782; div. 1793) (m. 1796; died 1825)
- Children: 4

Marguerite-Charlotte David (born Marguerite-Charlotte Pécoul) (29 November 1764 – 9 May 1826) was the wife of French painter Jacques-Louis David.

She was born in Paris to Charles-Pierre Pécoul, the superintendent of Royal buildings, and his wife Marie-Louise, née l'Alouette.

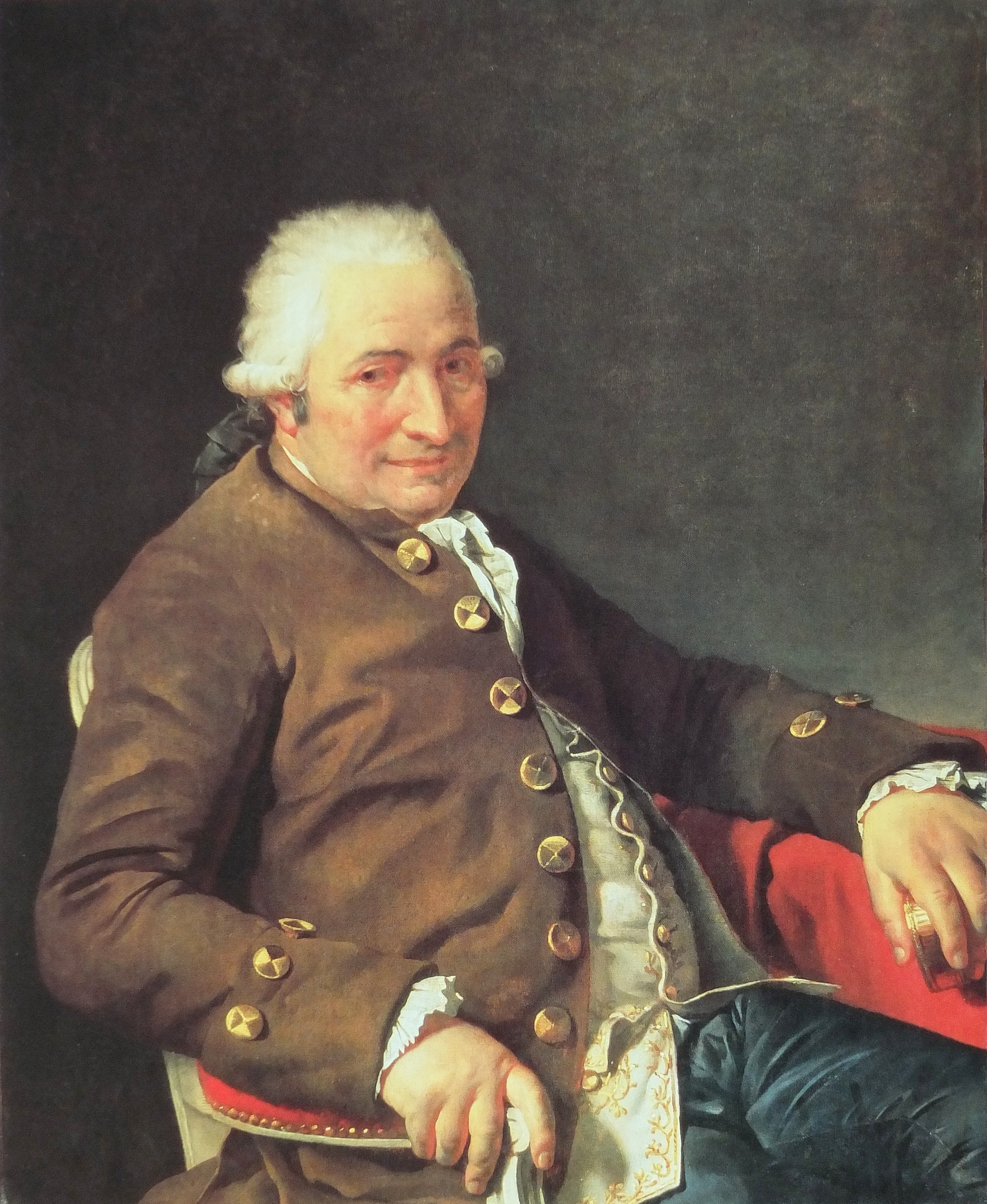
Charles-Pierre Pecoul, Charlotte's father

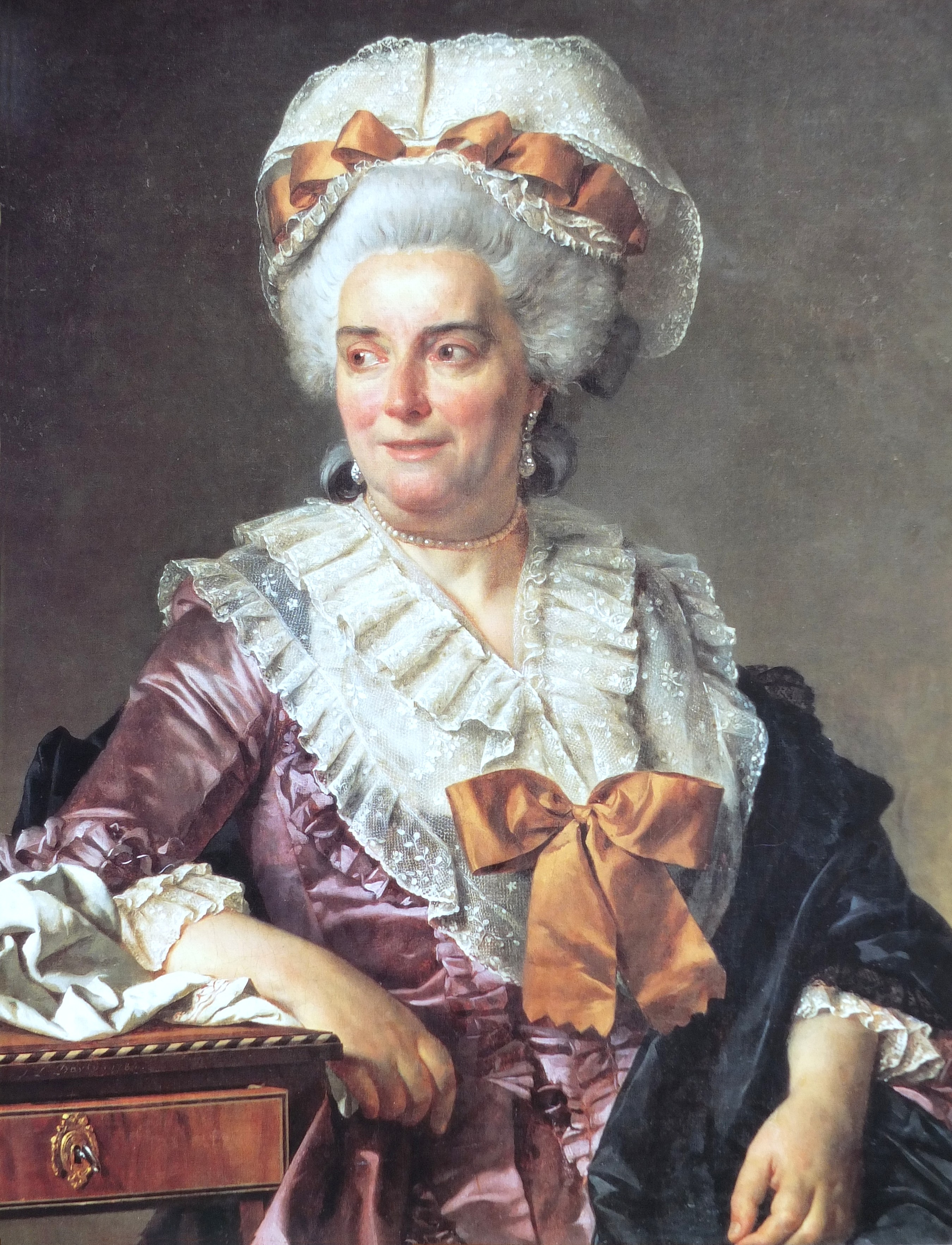
Geneviève Jacqueline Pecoul, Charlotte's step-mother

Marguerite-Charlotte was roughly half the age of her husband when they married on 16 May 1782. They had four children: Charles Louis Jules David (born 19 February 1783), François Eugène David (born 27 April 1784), and the twin daughters Laure Émilie Félicité David and Pauline Jeanne David (born 26 October 1786). In 1812 David would paint pendant portraits of his daughters. Laure Émilie Félicité (married to Baron Claude Marie Meunier), and Pauline Jeanne (married Jean-Baptiste Jeanin).

In 1784 Jacques-Louis David painted pendant portraits of his parents-in-law. By that time David-Pécoul's birth mother had died, and her father had married his second wife Geneviève Jacqueline, née Potain, who was the sister of the architect Nicolas Marie Potain. The portraits were possibly painted on the occasion of this second marriage:

David-Pécoul divorced her rebelling husband in 1793 for voting against the king during the Reign of Terror but after his imprisonment in 1794–1795 she remarried him in 1796. In 1795 he painted a portraits of Charlotte's sister Emilie.

When David was forced to leave Paris in 1815, David-Pécoul joined him in exile in Brussels where he enjoyed a career as painter and teacher before dying in 1825.

After her husband died, David-Pécoul tried to have him interred in Paris, but even after death he was refused repatriation. After the death of her husband, she returned to Paris, where she died the following year. Charlotte David-Pécoul is buried in The Père Lachaise cemetery along with her children. David's son had Jacques-Louis David's heart buried alongside the remains of his wife.
