= Van Gogh (1991 film) =

- Theatrical release poster
- Directed by: Maurice Pialat
- Written by: Maurice Pialat
- Produced by: Claude Berri; Pierre Chevalier; Hugues De Chastellux; Jean-Michel Gaillard; Pierre Lescure; Maurice Pialat; Georges Prost; André Rousselet; Daniel Toscan du Plantier; Dominique Wallon; Pierre Lescure
- Starring: Jacques Dutronc; Bernard Le Coq; Alexandra London; Gérard Séty; Corinne Bourdon; Elsa Zylberstein; Leslie Azzoulai
- Cinematography: Gilles Henry; Emmanuel Machuel
- Edited by: Yann Dedet; Nathalie Hubert; Hélène Viard
- Production companies: Erato Films; Le Studio Canal+; Les Films du Livradois; Films A2
- Distributed by: Gaumont Distribution
- Release date: 30 October 1991 (France)
- Running time: 158 minutes
- Country: France
- Language: French
- Box office: $513

Van Gogh is a 1991 French biographical drama film written, produced and directed by Maurice Pialat. It stars Jacques Dutronc in the role of Dutch painter Vincent van Gogh, for which he won the 1992 César Award for Best Actor. Set in 1890, the film follows the last 67 days of Van Gogh's life and explores his relationships with his brother Theo, his physician Paul Gachet (most famous as the subject of Van Gogh's painting Portrait of Dr. Gachet), and the women in his life, including Gachet's daughter, Marguerite.

The film was entered into the 1991 Cannes Film Festival, and selected as the French entry for the Best Foreign Language Film at the 64th Academy Awards, but was not accepted as a nominee.

Jean-Luc Godard praised the film in a letter to Pialat, in which he wrote: "My dear Maurice, your film is astonishing, totally astonishing; far beyond the cinematic horizon covered up until now by our wretched gaze."

== Cast ==
- Jacques Dutronc as Vincent van Gogh
- Alexandra London as Marguerite (Gachet)
- Bernard Le Coq as Theo van Gogh
- Gérard Séty as Gachet
- Elsa Zylberstein as Cathy
- Corinne Bourdon as Jo
- Leslie Azzoulai as Adeline (as Leslie Azoulai)
- Jacques Vidal as Ravoux
- Lise Lamétrie as Madame Ravoux
- Chantal Barbarit as Madame Chevalier
- Claudine Ducret as Piano Teacher
- Frédéric Bonpart as La Mouche
- Maurice Coussonneau as Chaponval
- Didier Barbieras The Idiot
- Gilbert Pignol as Gilbert
- André Bernot as The Red Mound

== Approach to biography ==
The film is noted for its anti-melodramatic and unsensationalistic approach to Van Gogh's life. For this reason it is often contrasted with Vincente Minnelli's Van Gogh film Lust for Life. Very little time is devoted to Van Gogh's art and work, with the bulk of the 158-minute running time occupied by the artist's often difficult personal relationships and declining mental state. The film omits most references to many of the most famous incidents in Van Gogh's life (including his attempt to cut off his ear in 1888) in favor of concentrating on the social dynamics of the late 19th century.

Writing in The Washington Post, critic Desson Howe explains: "In the movie, you don't see Van Gogh (Jacques Dutronc) complete the final brush stroke of a masterpiece, then call up old Gauguin for a celebratory absinthe. You do see a thin, stringy man, suffering from headaches, enjoying whores and moping around irascibly. Van Gogh denies you familiar highlights, keeps you from his working elbow and avoids the Ear Thing. But it shows you the quotidian stuff in between. This is the story of an artist being human, carrying canvases out or lugging them back in – their famous images intentionally out of sight."

== Production ==
Most of the scenes were filmed in Richelieu and Marigny-Marmande, in the Indre-et-Loire department, but filming also took place in small Poitou village of Saint-Rémy-sur-Creuse (Vienne).

== Reception ==
Van Gogh has an approval rating of 77% on review aggregator website Rotten Tomatoes, based on 13 reviews, and an average rating of 7.2/10.

== See also ==
- List of submissions to the 64th Academy Awards for Best Foreign Language Film
- List of French submissions for the Academy Award for Best Foreign Language Film
- Loving Vincent
- At Eternity's Gate (film)
