= List of French films of 1988 =

This is a list of films produced in France in 1988.

French films released in 1988
Title	Director	Cast	Genre	Notes
36 Fillette	Catherine Breillat	Delphine Zentout, Étienne Chicot, Olivier Parnière	Drama	
The Abyss	André Delvaux	Gian Maria Volonté, Sami Frey, Jacques Lippe	Historical film	French–Belgian co-production
The Bear	Jean-Jacques Annaud	Tchéky Karyo	Children's/Family, adventure	
The Big Blue	Luc Besson	Jean-Marc Barr, Rosanna Arquette, Jean Reno	Adventure	
Camille Claudel	Bruno Nuytten	Isabelle Adjani, Gérard Depardieu, Laurent Grévill	Drama	
Chocolat	Claire Denis	François Cluzet, Isaach de Bankolé, Giulia Boschi	Drama	
Cinema Paradiso	Giuseppe Tornatore	Philippe Noiret, Salvatore Cascio, Marco Leonardi	Drama	Italian–French co-production
Emmanuelle 6	Bruno Zincone	Nathalie Uher, Jean-René Gossart, Tamira	Drama	
L'enfance de l'art	Francis Girod	Clotilde de Bayser, Michel Bompoil	Drama	Entered into the 1988 Cannes Film Festival
Faceless	Jesús Franco	Helmut Berger, Brigitte Lahaie, Telly Savalas	Horror	
Gandahar	René Laloux		Animated	
Hôtel Terminus	Marcel Ophüls	Klaus Barbie, Marcel Ophüls	Documentary film	
Kung-Fu Master	Agnès Varda	Jane Birkin Mathieu Demy	Drama	Entered into the 38th Berlin International Film Festival
Let Sleeping Cops Lie	José Pinheiro	Alain Delon, Michel Serrault	Crime	
Life Is a Long Quiet River	Étienne Chatiliez	Benoît Magimel	Comedy	4 wins & 3 nominations
The Little Thief	Claude Miller	Charlotte Gainsbourg, Didier Bezace, Simon de La Brosse	Drama	
Natalia	Bernard Cohn	Pierre Arditi, Philippe Leory-Beaulieu, Gérard Blain, Michel Voïta	Drama	Screened at the 1988 Cannes Film Festival
Story of Women	Claude Chabrol	Isabelle Huppert, François Cluzet	Drama	Nomin. for Golden Globe, +9 wins, +3 nom.
To Kill a Priest	Agnieszka Holland	Christopher Lambert, Ed Harris, Joss Ackland	Crime	
Sand and Blood	Jeanne Labrune	Sami Frey	Drama	Screened at the 1988 Cannes Film Festival
The Vanishing	George Sluizer	Bernard-Pierre Donnadieu, Johanna ter Steege, Gene Bervoets	Thriller	Dutch–French co-production
