= Forêt Noire =

Forêt Noire (French: Black Forest), Foret Noire, Forest Noire, may refer to:

== Places ==
- Black Forest (French: Forêt Noire), Germany-France-Switzerland; a forest
- Forêt Noire, La Foa, New Caledonia; see List of cities in New Caledonia
- Avenue de la Forêt Noire, Strasbourg, Alsace, Grand-Est, France; a street, an avenue
  - Avenue de la Forêt Noire, Strasbourg, Alsace, Grand-Est, France; a red-light district, see List of red-light districts

== Other uses ==
- Foret Noire, a character in the manga series Magical Trans!
- Foret Noir, an artwork by Olaf Hajek
- Forêt-Noire, an 18th-century stage pantomime; see Théâtre de l'Ambigu-Comique
- La forêt noire, a 1794 piece of stage music by Alexander Reinagle
- "La Forêt noire (Tristesses)", a 19th-century song by Alice Sauvrezis
- "Foret Noire", a 2012 song by Rie Kugimiya off the album Kokohadoko
- Black Forest (2018 film) (French: Forêt Noire), a 2018 Quebec French-language short film

== See also ==
- Brisgau-Haute-Forêt-Noire, Baden-Württemberg, Germany; an arrondissement
- Black Forest (disambiguation) (French: Forêt Noire)
- Schwarzwald (disambiguation) (German: Black Forest)
- Dark Forest (disambiguation)
- Forest (disambiguation)
- Noir (disambiguation)
