= Black Forest (disambiguation) =

The Black Forest is a large forested mountain range in Baden-Württemberg, Germany.

Black Forest may also refer to:

== Places ==
=== United States ===
- Black Forest, Colorado, a census-designated place
- Black Forest, Nevada, a ghost town
- Black Forest Trail, Pennsylvania

=== Elsewhere ===
- Black Forest, South Australia, a suburb of Adelaide, Australia
- Chornyi Lis (Ukrainian: Чорний Ліс, lit. 'Black Forest'), a forest area in Ukraine

== Food ==
- Black Forest, a brand of gummy snacks owned by the Ferrara Pan Candy Company
- Black Forest gateau or Black Forest cake, a German dessert pastry
- Black Forest ham, a variety of smoked ham

== Films and television ==
- Black Forest (2010 film), a German film
- Black Forest (2012 film) (Floresta Negra), a fantasy, horror, sci fi film starring Tinsel Korey
- Black Forest (2013 Indian film), a 2013 Indian Malayalam-language film
- Black Forest: Hansel and Gretel and the 420 Witch, an alternate title for the 2013 American film Hansel & Gretel Get Baked
- Black Forest (2018 film) (Forêt Noire), a 2018 short film directed by Philippe David Gagné and Jean-Marc E. Roy
- The Black Forest (2019 film), a 2019 film by Ruth Platt
- The Black Forest Murders (2025), set in the Black Forest

== Music ==
- Black Forest Bluegrass, a 1979 album by P.D.Q. Bach (Peter Schickele)
- "The Black Forest", an instrumental song by Steve Vai from the album Alive in an Ultra World
- Black Forest (album), a 2008 album by Max Mutzke
- Black Forrest, an album by jazz saxophonist Jimmy Forrest

== Other uses ==
- The Black Forest (comics), a graphic novel series from Image Comics written by Todd Livingston and Robert Tinnell
- "The Black Forest", episode 10 in season 4 of the television series Six Feet Under
- Black Forest Horse, an equine breed
- Black Forest Observatory, a geophysical observatory in Baden-Württemberg, Germany
- Black Forest Open, a tennis tournament held in Freudenstadt, Baden-Württemberg, Germany
- Black Forest Games. a video game developer in Offenburg, Germany

== See also ==
- A Walk in the Black Forest
- Schwarzwald (disambiguation) (German: Black Forest)
- Forêt Noire (disambiguation) (French: Black Forest)
- Dark Forest (disambiguation)
- Black (disambiguation)
- Forest (disambiguation)
