= BFO =

BFO is an abbreviation that stands for:

- Basic Formal Ontology
- Beat frequency oscillator used to create an audio frequency signal for receiving continuous wave (Morse code) transmissions
- The Black Forest Observatory in Germany
- BiFeO_{3} (Bismuth ferrite), an inorganic chemical compound
- Boron monofluoride monoxide
- Budapest Festival Orchestra
- Bunker Fuel Oil, a (low-cost) type of fuel oil
- Federal Consultative Assembly (Bijeenkomst voor Federaal Overleg), an organisation of federal states of the United States of Indonesia
