= Alain Jomy =

French film music composer and critic

Alain Jomy (born 23 April 1941 in Nice) is a French film music composer, music critic, film critic, director, and writer. He trained at the École Normale de Musique de Paris where he was taught by Hélène Boschi.

== Filmography ==
- 1972: La Soirée du baron Swenbeck, by Hubert Niogret (short film)
- 1974: Nouvelles de Henry James, by Luc Béraud (TV series) (episode Ce qui savait Morgan)
- 1976: The Best Way to Walk, by Claude Miller
- 1977: This Sweet Sickness, by Claude Miller
- 1980: L'Embrumé, by Josée Dayan (TV)
- 1980: Haine, by Dominique Goult
- 1980: The Little Mermaid, by Roger Andrieux
- 1980: Anthracite, by Édouard Niermans
- 1981: Instinct de femme, by Claude Othnin-Girard
- 1981: Les Filles de Grenoble, by Joël Le Moigné
- 1984: O Lugar do Morto, by António-Pedro Vasconcelos
- 1985: L'Art d'aimer, by Dominique Cabrera
- 1985: An Impudent Girl, by Claude Miller
- 1988: The Little Thief, by Claude Miller
- 1991: Flora de Dresde, by Alain Jomy (short film)
- 1992: Ladrão Que Rouba a Anão Tem Cem Anos de Prisão, by Jorge Paixão da Costa (short film)
- 1992: Le Lieutenant Lorena (Aqui D'El Rei!), by António-Pedro Vasconcelos (TV)
- 1992: Un ballon dans la tête, by Michaëla Watteaux (TV)
- 1992: The Accompanist, by Claude Miller
- 1992: Les Eaux dormantes, by Jacques Tréfouel
- 1993: Une image de trop, by Jean-Claude Missiaen (TV)
- 1995: Été brulant, by Jérôme Foulon (TV)
- 1996: L'Île aux secrets, by Bruno Herbulot (TV)
- 1997: Oranges amères, by Michel Such
- 1997: Le Garçon d'orage, by Jérôme Foulon (TV)
- 1998: Un taxi dans la nuit, by Alain-Michel Blanc (TV)
- 1998: Il n'y a pas d'amour sans histoires by Jérôme Foulon
- 1999: Jaime, by António-Pedro Vasconcelos
- 2001: Un cœur oublié, by Philippe Monnier (TV)
- 2001: Une femme amoureuse, by Jérôme Foulon (TV)
- 2004: Une autre vie by Luc Béraud
- 2005: La storia di B. by Alexandre Messina
- 2009: Les Marais criminels by Alexandre Messina

== Theatre ==
- 1981: Music for La Môme vert-de-gris staged by Jean-Pierre Bastid after Poison Ivy by Peter Cheyney

== Awards ==
- Diapason d'Or 2008 for the DVD of the documentary film (1h 30) directed by Alain Jomy: Pablo Casals. Un musicien dans le monde.

== Publications ==
- Heureux comme à Monterey, Calmann-Lévy, 2000
- Le livre d'Elena, Ramsay, 2007
- Olga et les siens, Alma Editeur, on Babeblio 2018, ISBN 2362792471
