= Didier Bezace =

French actor (1946–2020)

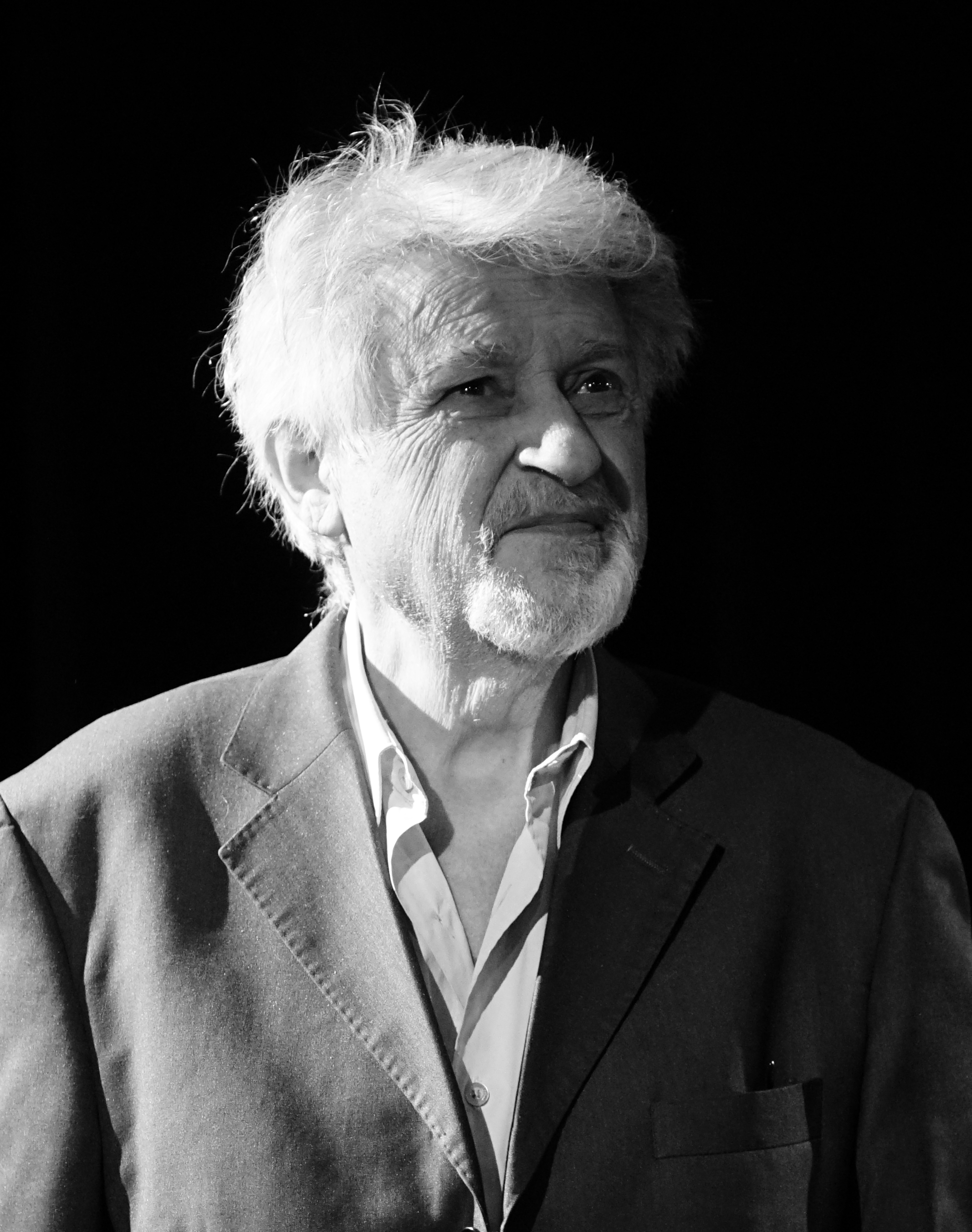
- Born: 10 February 1946; Paris, France
- Died: 11 March 2020 (aged 74); Paris
- Occupation: Actor
- Years active: 1973 – 2020

Didier Bezace (10 February 1946 – 11 March 2020) was a French actor.

== Life and career ==
Theatre student at the International Dramatic University Centre in Nancy, Didier Bezace received lessons from Bernard Drot, Jean-Marie Patte, Gilles Sandier, María Casares and Henri Gourbion.

Co-founder with Jean-Louis Benoît and Jacques Nichet of the theatre of l'Aquarium-Cartoucherie de Vincennes, he participated in all the shows that the company produced as author, stager and actor. Didier Bezace was the director of the théâtre de La Commune in Aubervilliers since 1997 and continued to act in cinema and television.

=== 2005 works ===
- Avis aux intéressés by Daniel Keene
- With Séverine Magois, he was honoured with a Molière for his production of La Version de Browning by Terence Rattigan, for "best adaptation of a foreign work".

He staged works by Georges Feydeau, Emmanuel Bove, and Molière whose (The School for Wives) opened the Festival d'Avignon in July 2001.

Other work included La Femme changée en renard by David Garnett, Pereira prétend by Antonio Tabucchi...

In cinema, he worked with Claude Miller (La Petite Voleuse), Bertrand Tavernier, Jeanne Labrune, Anne Théron, Valérie Guignabodet, Claude Zidi and Rémi Bezançon.

In television, he can be seen in Les Thibault, Sissi and recently in Mon fils d'ailleurs.

He was also in the film Le Pressentiment, working with Jean-Pierre Darroussin based on the novel by Emmanuel Bove (Released in October 2006).

2006 pieces at the Théâtre de La Commune Objet perdu: 3 short pieces from memory, crying, recital, violin by Daniel Keene, Festival of here and now by Daniel Keene.

=== 2006-2007 season ===
Themes of 'Mothers' with La Maman bohême based on Médée by Dario Fo and Franca Rame and May by Hanif Kureishi

== Filmography ==
- 1976 : Guerres civiles en France, sketch Premier Empire by François Barat
- 1988 : The Little Thief by Claude Miller
- 1989 : Dédé by Jean-Louis Benoît
- 1991 : Sur la terre comme au ciel by Marion Hänsel
- 1991 : L.627 by Bertrand Tavernier
- 1992 : Taxi de nuit by Serge Leroy
- 1993 : Petits arrangements avec les morts by Pascale Ferran
- 1993 : Profil bas by Claude Zidi
- 1995 : Les Voleurs by André Téchiné
- 1997 : La Femme de chambre du Titanic by Bigas Luna
- 1998 : Le Plus beau pays du monde by Marcel Bluwal
- 1998 : La Dilettante by Pascal Thomas
- 1998 : Ça commence aujourd'hui by Bertrand Tavernier
- 1999 : Voyous voyelles by Serge Meynard
- 1999 : La Face cachée de la lune (La otra cara de la luna) by Lluis Josep Comeron
- 2000 : Ça ira mieux demain by Jeanne Labrune
- 2001 : Ceci est mon corps by Rodolphe Marconi
- 2002 : C'est le bouquet! by Jeanne Labrune
- 2002 : Nuit noire by Daniel Colas (uncredited)
- 2003 : Mariages ! by Valérie Guignabodet
- 2003 : Ce qu'ils imaginent by Anne Théron
- 2004 : Cause toujours ! by Jeanne Labrune
- 2005 : Ma vie en l'air by Rémi Bezançon
- 2006 : Le Pressentiment by Jean-Pierre Darroussin
- 2011 : The Minister
- 2016 : The Origin of Violence

== Television ==
- 2005 : La Belle et le sauvage by Bertrand Arthuys
- 2006 : Les Camarades by François Luciani
- 2007 : Les Liens du sang by Régis Musset : Juge Dugourd
