= An Impudent Girl =

- Directed by: Claude Miller
- Written by: Claude Miller; Luc Béraud; Bernard Stora; Annie Miller
- Produced by: Marie-Laure Reyre
- Starring: Charlotte Gainsbourg
- Cinematography: Dominique Chapuis
- Edited by: Albert Jurgenson
- Music by: Alain Jomy
- Production companies: Cinema National de la Cinématographie; Films Antenne 2 Monthyon Films; Oliane Productions; Telema Productions
- Distributed by: UGC Distribution
- Release date: 11 December 1985
- Running time: 96 minutes
- Country: France
- Language: French

An Impudent Girl (French: L'Effrontée) is a 1985 French film directed by Claude Miller. It stars Charlotte Gainsbourg, who won the César Award for Most Promising Actress, and Bernadette Lafont, who won the César Award for Best Actress in a Supporting Role. It is a loose adaptation of the novel Frankie Addams (French title of Carson McCullers's The Member of the Wedding).

The film won the Louis Delluc Prize, and received César nominations for Best Film, Best Director, Most Promising Actor, Best Original Screenplay or Adaptation, Best Costume Design and Best Sound. The song "Sarà perché ti amo" by Ricchi e Poveri is featured in the movie, playing over the end credits. An English version named "Rock It Rock It Tonight" was also released, most likely to promote the movie.

== Plot ==
Charlotte Castang is a 13-year-old girl of a working class background, living near a nightclub known as the "Roule-Roule", with her widowed father; crass brother, Jacky; and the family maid, Leóne. Her only friend is Lulu, a sick 10-year-old whose mom works late shifts at a hospital, and who she regards as a pest. At school, during a swimming lesson, she fails to dive properly and scrapes her knee. After being checked by the nurse she watches through the door of the amphitheatre, where students are watching a tape of a rehearsal of pianist prodigy, Clara Bauman, who is her age. A teacher there lets her in, allowing her to skip class as it's the last day of school before the summer holiday. After watching her play, she becomes obsessed, admiring her as sophisticated and wishing to be her friend.

The next day, Charlotte and Lulu go out on a walk. While viewing antiques, a car stops by and the driver asks for directions to the metalworker, with Clara in the passenger seat. Charlotte agrees to lead them. She watches Clara from afar as she talks to the metalworker fixing her piano stool. She asks them to deliver it tomorrow for a show at a rented lake house. When they leave, Clara stops to thank Charlotte, kissing her on both cheeks. Back at home, she tells the maid, Leóne about her meeting with Clara and bickers with her brother, Jacky, when he pees in the bushes. Already irritated, she yells at Lulu, then getting scolded by Leóne for being rude and acting envious. Charlotte goes to sleep with her dad, who scolds her as well before letting her in. In the morning Jacky goes to say goodbye to Charlotte before leaving for vacation; she asks him to take her with him before rolling back to sleep. He kisses on the cheek before leaving.

Charlotte waits outside the metalworking shop, spying on the metalworker who is delivering Clara's piano stool. She waits for him outside a hotel bar and he asks to drop her off at home. She lies to him that she is 15 and he tells her his name is Jean. When he stops near her house he abruptly kisses on the lips. After she changes, they go to the lake house where Clara is staying. Charlotte carries the piano stool in on the pretense she is Jean's sister helping him. Not wanting to leave and wishing to meet Clara, she convinces Jean that she has to stay. She walks to the back of the house and meets Sam, Clara's concert manager, at the pool. Clara is jetboating on the lake with others; on return she tells Charlotte to stay for a party tonight before leaving to practice. Though Charlotte is hungry, she doesn't eat anything. Sam jumps into the pool and tries to convince her to swim too. Charlotte becomes dizzy from hunger and faints, falling into the water. When she awakes, Clara lets her wear her concert dress and jokingly tells her to be her manager. Charlotte watches her play for the party before leaving for home.

Charlotte phones in many times to Sam, though nobody ever picks up or listens to her messages, she tells everyone that she's leaving with Clara in July. She meets Jean at the hotel bar again and tells him she's leaving. She relunctantly promises him to go see "The Exorcist" in theatres with him later. Back home, Charlotte has a picnic with Lulu and Leóne, though it soon devolves into an argument and she burst into tears with Leóne then calming her down. After she and Jean finish the movie he brings her to his room upstairs, locking the door. He shows her an illuminated globe that spins. When she asks to leave he hugs her before forcibly pushing her to the bed, trying to kiss her. She manages to free herself and hits his head with the globe, breaking it. After, she goes to attend Clara's concert with Lulu and Leóne. Upset that Charlotte wants to leave with Clara, she starts to yell that she doesn't want her to leave with the pianist. The three are forced out of the concert hall; Charlotte finds a way backstage and meets Sam again. She asks about her job as Clara's manager and he tells her to wait after the show, where he gives her a letter written by Clara. Lulu runs after Charlotte in joy when she finds she's not leaving, though ends up bleeding from the nose and fainting.

In a children's hospital, Charlotte gifts Lulu a perfume she uses and the two hold hands as they look out the balcony and talk.

== Cast ==
- Charlotte Gainsbourg as Charlotte Castang
- Clothilde Baudon as Clara Bauman
- Julie Glenn as Lulu
- Bernadette Lafont as Léone
- Jean-Claude Brialy as Sam
- Jean-Philippe Écoffey as Jean
- Raoul Billerey as Antoine Castang
- Richard Guerry as Regard sombre

== Production ==
The film was seen as a return by Claude Miller to the material of his first feature, The Best Way to Walk. Miller:

I'm fascinated by those violent passions that make you ready to cut your throat for something you believe in, passions that, for better or worse, lose their edge as you grow older. In An Impudent Girl though the conflict is much less violent than the humiliation and hurt of The Best Way to Walk. The main character comes out of it very well, in fact it's certainly my most optimistic film. I wasn't trying to show a terrible drama, just one of those ordinary events which happen to all adolescents and shape us for life. I'm the proof because I still remember those tiny episodes that ended up affecting me more deeply than I ever realised at the time.

The film was a loose adaptation of the novel The Member of the Wedding by Carson McCullers, although that is uncredited. Miller:

It isn't a direct adaptation. There were just enough elements from the book for us to apply for the rights. First of all the Americans who owned them took ages to reply. Then they wanted a huge sum of money, almost as much as the cost of the film.

Two weeks before shooting was scheduled to begin, the rights had not been secured. Miller decided to go ahead and make the movie anyway. "Now we're negotiating to pay a reasonable percentage," he said in 1986. "Fortunately the film has been a hit."

Miller cast Gainsbourg after seeing her in the film Paroles et Musiques. He approached her parents for permission to cast her. It helped the marketability of the movie because, as Miller says, "Charlotte was in a way already a star because of her parents - people went to see her out of curiosity."

Claude Miller revealed that in the film there was supposed to be a masturbation scene played by Charlotte Gainsbourg. Although the scene was indeed shot, Miller later censored himself and removed it from the final cut.

== Reception ==
The Guardian said it was "one of Miller's best films since The Best Way to Walk".

The film was a success at the box office selling 2,761,141 tickets and was the 11th most attended film of the year at the French box office. Miller later made The Little Thief with Gainsbourg.
