= Boomerang (1976 film) =

- Directed by: José Giovanni
- Written by: José Giovanni; Alain Delon
- Produced by: Horst Wendlandt; Alan Del
- Starring: Alain Delon; Carla Gravina
- Cinematography: Pierre-William Glenn
- Edited by: Françoise Javet
- Music by: Georges Delerue
- Distributed by: Fox-Lira
- Release dates: August 17, 1976 (France); May 12, 1977 (Milan)
- Countries: France; Italy
- Languages: French; Italian

Boomerang (French: Comme un boomerang, Italian: Il figlio del gangster) is a 1976 French-Italian crime film starring Alain Delon, Carla Gravina and Charles Vanel and directed by José Giovanni.

It recorded admissions of 787,208 in France.

== Cast ==
- Alain Delon : Jacques Batkin
- Carla Gravina : Muriel Batkin
- Charles Vanel : Jean Ritter
- Louis Julien : Eddy Batkin
- Dora Doll : Ginette, Eddy's mother
- Pierre Maguelon : Police commissioner Leoni
- Suzanne Flon : Widow Grimaldi
- Christian de Tillière : The judge
- Gérard Hérold : Vaulnet, the lawyer
- Jacques Debary : President Lenoir
- Reinhard Kolldehoff : Feldman, the banker
- Jacques Rispal : Albert Chiusi, watchmaker
