= Noir =

Noir (or noire) is the French word for black.

Noir or noire may also refer to:

== Arts, entertainment, and media ==
=== Genres ===
- Film noir, a film genre
  - Rural noir (film), also known as outback noir in Australia, films and TV series with crimes set in rural locations
- Noir fiction, a literary subgenre of crime fiction
  - Rural noir (fiction), also known as outback noir in Australia, novels with crimes set in rural locations
  - Southern noir, noir fiction set in the Southern United States
- Nordic noir, noir fiction, TV series, and films set in the Nordic countries
- Folk noir, a music genre

=== Games ===
- Discworld Noir, a 1999 video game by GT Interactive

=== Music ===
- Noir (band), a South Korean boy band which debuted in 2018
- Noir, a poetic/techno music duo comprising Georg Kajanus and Tim Dry
- Noir (Callisto album), 2006
- Noir (William Control album), 2010
- Noir (BSBD album), 2011
- Noir (B.A.P album), 2016
- Noir (Smino album), 2018
- "Noir" (song), released by Sunmi in 2019

=== Fictional characters ===
- Noir, alias of Ray Balzac Courland in Gorgeous Carat manga
- Noir, a character in the video game La Pucelle: Tactics (2002)
- Noire, a character in the video game Fire Emblem: Awakening (2012)
- Noire, a character in the video game series Hyperdimension Neptunia
- Black Noir, a character in the comic and TV series The Boys
- Cat Noir, the superhero identity of Adrien Agreste in Miraculous: Tales of Ladybug & Cat Noir
- Guy Noir, a fictional private detective in A Prairie Home Companion radio show
- Jack Noir, a character in the webcomic Homestuck
- Madame Noir, a character in the Ressha Sentai ToQger
- Spider-Man Noir, a Marvel comic book character
- Vince Noir, a fictional character in the BBC television comedy The Mighty Boosh
- Noir (ノワール), the main antagonist in the anime series Kirakira PreCure a la Mode
- Noir Stardia, the main protagonist in the anime series The Hidden Dungeon Only I Can Enter
- Noir, codename of Haru Okumura in the role-playing game Persona 5

=== Other arts and entertainment ===
- Noir (film), a 2015 Canadian film
- Noir (Jeter novel), a 1998 novel by K. W. Jeter
- Noir (Moore novel), a 2018 novel by Christopher Moore
- Noir (TV series), a 2001 Japanese anime television series about a pair of female assassins
- Noir: A Collection of Crime Comics, a 2009 black-and-white crime comics anthology
- Noir: A Shadowy Thriller, a 1996 video game by Cyberdreams

== Places ==
- Noire River (Ottawa River tributary), in the Outaouais region of Quebec
- Noire River, a tributary of the Yamaska River in Eastern Townships area, Quebec

== Other uses ==
- Noir (fashion), a Danish luxury fashion brand
- Noir (surname), people with the surname
- Notice of Intent to Revoke (NOIR), a notice by the U.S. Citizenship and Immigration Services
- Bugatti La Voiture Noire, a Bugatti Chiron mid-engine two-seater sports car
