= Schwarzwald (disambiguation) =

Schwarzwald, Schwarzwalder or Schwarzwälder are German terms referring to the Black Forest.

They can refer to:

== People ==
- Schwarzwald family, a Hanseatic League merchant family of Danzig
- Eugenie Schwarzwald (1872–1940), Austrian philanthropist, writer and pedagogue.
- Hermann Schwarzwald (1871–1939), Austrian lawyer and bank director married to Eugenie Schwarzwald.
- Milton Schwarzwald (1891–1950), American film director, composer and producer.
- Jean Schwarzwalder (b. 1980), a roller derby skater known as Suzy Hotrod
- Michael Schwarzwalder (1943–2013), member of the Ohio State Senate
- Rosemarie Schwarzwälder (b. 1945), Swiss gallery owner, art dealer, and journalist

== Places ==
- Schwarzwald, the large mountainous Black Forest region of Baden-Württemberg, Germany
  - Hochschwarzwald, the High Black Forest
  - Mittlerer Schwarzwald, the Central Black Forest
  - Nordschwarzwald, the Northern Black Forest
  - Südschwarzwald, the Southern Black Forest
- Schwarzwald, the small village of Feketeerdő, Hungary on the Austrian/Slovak border
- Schwarzwald-Baar-Center, a large shopping mall in Villingen-Schwenningen, Germany
- Schwarzwald-Baar-Kreis, a Landkreis (district) in the south of Baden-Württemberg, Germany
- Schwarzwald Railway (Baden), electrified railway line in Baden-Württemberg, Germany
- Schwarzwald-Stadion, football stadium in Freiburg, Baden-Württemberg, Germany
- Schwarzwälder Hirschsprung, a local legend that has since become a place name in the Black Forest
- Schwarzwälder Hochwald, an area in Rhineland-Palatinate, Germany - not to be confused with the High Black Forest
- Schwarzwald, the former German name for town Czerniak, in Mrągowo County, Warmian-Masurian Voivodeship, Poland
- 10663 Schwarzwald, a main-belt asteroid, the 10663th minor planet registered

== Food ==
- Schwarzwälder Kirschtorte, a specific type of Black Forest gateau cake
- Schwarzwälder Kirschtwasser, a Kirsch brandy made from tart cherries from the Black Forest region
- Schwarzwälder Schinken, the Black Forest ham

== Organizations ==
- Schwarzwald schools, a system of Austrian girls schools developed by Eugenie Schwarzwald
- Schwarzwälder Freilichtmuseum Vogtsbauernhof, the Black Forest Open Air Museum
- Schwarzwaldverein, the oldest German hiking and mountaineering club

== Other uses ==
- Schwarzwald, 1997 studio album by the Dutch metal band Unlord
- Schwarzwälder Kaltblut, the Black Forest Horse breed
- "Schwarzwald" (St. Elsewhere), a 1987 television episode

== See also ==
- Black Forest (disambiguation)
- Forêt Noire (disambiguation) (French: Black Forest)
