= Premonition (2006 film) =

- Film poster
- Directed by: Jean-Pierre Darroussin
- Screenplay by: Jean-Pierre Darroussin; Valérie Stroh
- Based on: Le Pressentiment by Emmanuel Bove
- Produced by: Patrick Sobelman
- Starring: Jean-Pierre Darroussin
- Cinematography: Bernard Cavalié
- Edited by: Nelly Quettier
- Music by: Albert Marcœur
- Production companies: Agat Films & Cie; France 2 Cinéma; BAC Films
- Distributed by: BAC Films
- Release dates: 1 September 2006 (Venice); 4 October 2006 (France)
- Running time: 97 minutes
- Country: France
- Language: French
- Budget: $3.4 million
- Box office: $872,854

Premonition (French: Le Pressentiment) is a 2006 French drama film directed by and starring Jean-Pierre Darroussin, and based on the novel Le Pressentiment by Emmanuel Bove. It won the Louis Delluc Prize for Best First Film in 2006 and the award for Best First French Film from the French Syndicate of Cinema Critics in 2007.

== Cast ==
- Jean-Pierre Darroussin as Charles Benesteau
- Valérie Stroh as Isabelle Chevasse
- Amandine Jannin as Sabrina Jozic
- Hippolyte Girardot as Marc Bénesteau
- Nathalie Richard as Gabrielle Charmes-Aicquart
- Natalia Dontcheva as Helena Jozic
- Ivan Franek as Thomas Jozic
- Anne Canovas as Alice Benesteau
- Laurence Roy as Edith Benesteau
- Jonathan Altman as Ferdinand Benesteau
- Aristide Demonico as Monsieur Serrurier
- Michele Ernou as Madame Serrurier
- Mbembo as Eugénie
- Didier Bezace as Albert Testat
- Maurice Chevit as An old man
- Patrick Bonnel as Jean
- Vittoria Scognamiglio as Farida Garibaldi
- Thibault de Montalembert as The Inspector
- Lou-Nil Font as Victor Chevasse
- Alain Libolt as Edouard Benesteau
- François Monnié as Monsieur Garibaldi
- Antoine Valli as The neighbour
