= Noir (surname) =

The surname Noir (literally meaning "black" in French) may refer to:

- Christel Noir, French author, screenwriter, and artist.
- Jim Noir (born 1982), English singer-songwriter
- Ricardo Noir (born 1987), Boca Juniors football player
- Victor Noir (1848–1870), French journalist killed by Prince Pierre Bonaparte

== Fictional ==
- Jack Noir, a character in the webcomic Homestuck
- Guy Noir, a character in A Prairie Home Companion radio show
- Vince Noir, a character in the BBC television comedy The Mighty Boosh
- Cat Noir, a superhero from the French TV show Miraculous: Tales of Ladybug & Cat Noir
