= The Smile (film) =

1994 French drama film

- Theatrical release poster
- Directed by: Claude Miller
- Written by: Claude Miller
- Produced by: Jean-Louis Livi, Annie Miller et Chris Sheridan
- Starring: Jean-Pierre Marielle; Richard Bohringer; Emmanuelle Seigner
- Cinematography: Guillaume Schiffman
- Edited by: Anne Lafarge
- Music by: Pierre Boscheron; Vincent Glenn; Antoine Ouvrier
- Production company: Les Films de la Boissière
- Distributed by: AMLF
- Release date: 17 August 1994 (France)
- Running time: 85 minutes
- Country: France
- Language: French

The Smile (French: Le sourire) is a 1994 French drama film directed by Claude Miller. Moving between reality and dream, it tells the story of a psychiatrist (Jean-Pierre Marielle) facing imminent death who follows the fantasy of one last love affair with a much younger woman (Emmanuelle Seigner). She also follows a fantasy of being a stripper who drives men wild, and is herself close to death.

The theme of the film is stated at the outset by a mock-Chinese quote: Let us hurry to enjoy creatures in their youth. Let's gorge ourselves on best wines and scents. Never let the blooming flower fade.

== Plot ==
In a private clinic set in a country estate, the aging psychiatrist Pierre-François collapses with a heart attack from listening to the steamy fantasies of a sex-mad young patient Brigitte. After examining him, his wife and colleague Gaby warns him that the next attack could come at any time and will probably be the last one. Feeling the need to settle things, he goes to see his ex-wife Chantal at Saint-Trojan-les-Bains, returning a picture that she had treasured but that he had kept.

On the train he is struck by the sight of a young woman asleep, who projects an aura of sensuality. She is Odile, a tennis coach, whom he later sees at the beach. Odile suffers from mysterious nosebleeds. Back at his clinic Pierre-François goes cycling and loses control of his bicycle while going downhill through a wood that takes him to Odile's tennis club. As there is a travelling fair in the nearby town, he asks her to meet him there. She has already investigated the fair on her own, being fascinated by the strip show and catching the eye of its manager Jean-Jean, who asks if she would like to try this line of work. The date ends with Pierre-François on the ground with a bloody nose after he tries to kiss Odile, but in the morning each forgives the other.

Jean-Jean tells Odile it would be better if she worked for a show further from home, saying he will take her to see his friend La Tante at Angoulême. Odile asks Pierre-François to come along as her companion. After visiting La Tante, the three go off for a meal, which ends badly with Odile storming out and Pierre-François, after collapsing, being put in an upstairs room. Later, Odile joins him there and the two make love.

The next day, after Odile has spent some time getting to know the strippers, La Tante puts her on stage clothed among four naked girls. She strips to huge applause and then in a trance glides into the wildly excited audience. Pierre-François desperately tries to get to her through the packed crowd but he is too late, for she has collapsed dead.

== Cast ==
- Jean-Pierre Marielle as Pierre-François
- Richard Bohringer as Jean-Jean
- Emmanuelle Seigner as Odile
- Bernard Verley as The aunt
- Nathalie Cardone as Brigitte
- Nadia Barentin as Gaby
- Christine Pascal as Chantal

== Production ==
The film was partly shot in the Gers department, around Auch and in Gimont.
