= The Little Mermaid (1980 film) =

1980 romantic drama film

- Directed by: Roger Andrieux
- Screenplay by: Roger Andrieux
- Starring: Philippe Léotard; Laura Alexis
- Cinematography: Robert Alazraki
- Edited by: Kenout Peltier
- Music by: Alain Jomy
- Release date: 1980
- Language: French

The Little Mermaid (French: La Petite Sirène) is a 1980 French romantic drama film written and directed by Roger Andrieux. It was entered into the main competition at the 37th Venice International Film Festival.

== Cast ==
- Philippe Léotard as Georges
- Laura Alexis as Isabelle
- Évelyne Dress as Nelly
- Marie Dubois as Bénédicte
- Marianne Winquist as Véronique
- Diane Sorelle as Claire
- Jean Franval as Harcour
- François Dyrek as Georges' friend
- André Penvern as Georges' friend
- Nicole Vassel as Georges' friend
- Manuela Gourary as Georges' friend
- Pierre Frag as Robert
- Louis Julien as Police officer

== Production ==
The film is based on the novel Les petites sirènes by Yves Dangerfield.

== Release ==
The film entered the main competition at the 37th edition of the Venice Film Festival. It was also screened at the Montreal International Film Festival.

== Reception ==
A contemporary Variety review noted: "Film's originality and force come from Andrieux inscribing the tale in a banal contemporary setting yet telling the story with beguiling fairy tale simplicity in which a veneer of charm barely conceals a strong undercurrent of anxiety." Falvo Angelo from Corriere della Sera described the film as "a delicate fable", praising the lack of morbosity in spite of its problematic script.
