= Simon de La Brosse =

French actor

Simon de La Brosse (9 October 1964 – 17 April 1998) was a French actor from Suresnes. He started his acting career in the role of Sylvain in Éric Rohmer's Pauline at the Beach in 1983. He committed suicide in 1998 at age 33, shortly after completing the television film Louise et les Marchés.

== Filmography ==
Year	Title	Role	Notes
1983	Pauline at the Beach	Sylvain	
1983	Waiter!	Philippe	
1985	Glamour	Rémy	
1985	Family Life	Cédric	
1985	An Impudent Girl	Jacky Castang	
1986	Betty Blue	Young guard	Director's cut
1986	Disorder	Gabriel	
1987	Buisson ardent	Henri	
1987	Travelling avant	Donald	
1987	Les innocents	Stéphane	
1988	The Little Thief	Raoul	
1990	Strike It Rich	Philippe	
1990	Après après-demain	Paul	
1991	Ao Fim da Noite	Jorge	
1991	Les arcandiers	Tonio	
1993	Shadow of a Doubt	BPM Inspector	
1994	Des feux mal éteints	Travaire	
