= Nikola Kastner =

German actress

Nikola Kastner (born 1983 in Hamburg, West Germany) is an actress who has appeared in numerous German films and television productions. She is best known internationally for her roles in Homeland and Deutschland 83.

She took private acting lessons as a child and from 2000 to 2002 appeared on stage at the Deutsches Schauspielhaus in Hamburg. Her film roles include Black Forest (2010), Phoenix and The Origin of Violence (2016).
