= Speak to Me of Love (1975 film) =

- Directed by: Michel Drach
- Written by: Gilbert Tanugi
- Produced by: Daniel Deschamps
- Starring: Louis Julien; Nathalie Roussel; Andréa Ferréol
- Cinematography: William Lubtchansky
- Edited by: Geneviève Winding
- Music by: Alan Reeves
- Production company: Port Royal Films
- Distributed by: Gaumont Distribution
- Release date: 29 October 1975
- Running time: 98 minutes
- Country: France
- Language: French

Speak to Me of Love (French: Parlez-moi d'amour) is a 1975 French drama film directed by Michel Drach and starring Louis Julien, Nathalie Roussel and Andréa Ferréol.

== Cast ==
- Louis Julien as Daniel
- Nathalie Roussel as Anne
- Andréa Ferréol as La voisine
- Michel Aumont as Le père de Daniel
- Joëlle Bernard as La mère de Daniel
- Nelly Borgeaud as La belle mère
- Zouc as La soeur d'Anne
- Jean Topart as Le quinquagénaire
- Jacques Canselier as Le jockey
- Pierre Destailles as M. Osaye
- Monique Lejeune as Mme Bourget
- Gérard Hérold as M. Bourget
- Philippe Clévenot as Le psychologue
- Patrick Le Mauff as Le 'Prince charmant'
- André Valardy as Le directeur du théâtre 'Chocolat'
- Robert Dadiès as Le metteur en scène
- François Guillaume as L'infirmier

== Bibliography ==
- Rège, Philippe. Encyclopedia of French Film Directors, Volume 1. Scarecrow Press, 2009.
