= The Gatekeeper's Daughter =

- Directed by: Jérôme Savary
- Written by: Jérôme Savary; Roland Topor
- Produced by: Bernard Bolzinger
- Starring: Mona Heftre; Michel Dussarat; Annick Berger
- Cinematography: Robert Alazraki; Dominique Chapuis
- Edited by: Claude Reznik; Hélène Viard
- Music by: Éric Demarsan
- Production company: Atelier de Production Cinématographique
- Distributed by: Parafrance Films
- Release date: 3 September 1975
- Running time: 95 minutes
- Country: France
- Language: French

The Gatekeeper's Daughter (French: La fille du garde-barrière) is a 1975 French comedy film directed by Jérôme Savary and starring Mona Heftre, Michel Dussarat and Annick Berger.

== Main cast ==
- Mona Heftre as Mona
- Michel Dussarat as Dudu
- Annick Berger as Madame Julien
- Jean-Paul Farré as Le maire
- Valérie Kling as Gertrude, la femme du maire
- Jean-Paul Muel as Sheik Abdullah
- Roland Topor as Le pochard
- Jérôme Savary as Le garde-barrière
- Maritin as Chauffeur
- Guy Gallardo as Bernard
- Gérard Boucaron as L'eunuque
- Pablo Vigil as Le vizir
- Jean Abeillé as Le Président de la République

== Bibliography ==
- Rège, Philippe. Encyclopedia of French Film Directors, Volume 1. Scarecrow Press, 2009.
