= Sobibor, October 14, 1943, 4 p.m. =

2001 film

- Directed by: Claude Lanzmann
- Written by: Claude Lanzmann
- Starring: Yehuda Lerner
- Cinematography: Caroline Champetier; Dominique Chapuis
- Edited by: Chantal Hymans; Sabine Mamou
- Production companies: Why Not Productions; Les Films Aleph; France 2 Cinéma
- Distributed by: Mars Distribution
- Release date: 13 May 2001
- Running time: 95 minutes
- Country: France
- Languages: French; Hebrew

Sobibor, October 14, 1943, 4 p.m. (French: Sobibor, 14 octobre 1943, 16 heures) is a 2001 French documentary film directed by Claude Lanzmann. It was screened out of competition at the 2001 Cannes Film Festival. The title and date refer to the Sobibor revolt, one of only two successful uprisings at German extermination camps during the Second World War (the other being at Treblinka).

== See also ==
- List of Holocaust films
- Sobibór extermination camp
