= Dominique Chapuis =

French cinematographer (1948-2001)

- Born: 16 January 1948; Paris
- Died: 4 November 2001 (aged 53); Paris
- Occupation: Cinematographer

Dominique Chapuis (French pronunciation: [dɔminik ʃapɥi]; born 16 January 1948 – died 4 November 2001) was a French cinematographer known for his work on films like Friends, Beautiful Memories, and La mort du Chinois. He died of colon cancer in 2001 in the 15th arrondissement of Paris.

== Selected filmography ==
- Beautiful Memories (2001)
- Sobibór, October 14, 1943, 4 p.m. (2001)
- Les fantômes de Louba (2001)
- Taking Wing (2000)
- Les gens qui s'aiment (1999)
- A Visitor from the Living (1999)
- La mère Christain (1998)
- Les kidnappeurs (1998)
- La mort du Chinois (1998)
- The Kid from Chaaba (1997)
- Le géographe manuel (1996)
- Calino Maneige (1996)
- Bastard Brood (1996)
- Tsahal (1994)
- Pax (1994)
- Mina Tannenbaum (1994)
- Pas très catholique (1994)
- Friends (1993)
- The Last Dive (1992)
- My Life Is Hell (1991)
- Welcome to Veraz (1991)
- La voix humaine (1990)
- Gaspard et Robinson (1990)
- Overseas (1990)
- Love Comedy (1989)
- The Little Thief (1988)
- La petite amie (1988)
- L'enfance de l'art (1988)
- Sweet Lies (1987)
- Les keufs (1987)
- Où que tu sois (1987)
- L'état de grâce (1986)
- Willy/Milly (1986)
- États d'âme (1986)
- A Killing Affair (1986)
- An Impudent Girl (1985)
- Contes clandestins (1985)
- Shoah (1985)
- Tea in the Harem (1985)
- Nasdine Hodja au pays du business (1984)
- Black Shack Alley (1983)
- They Call It an Accident (1982)
- Countryman (1982)
- The Gatekeeper's Daughter (1975)
