= Marbach Stud =

Horse stud farm in Germany

Coordinates: 48.384°N 9.418°E

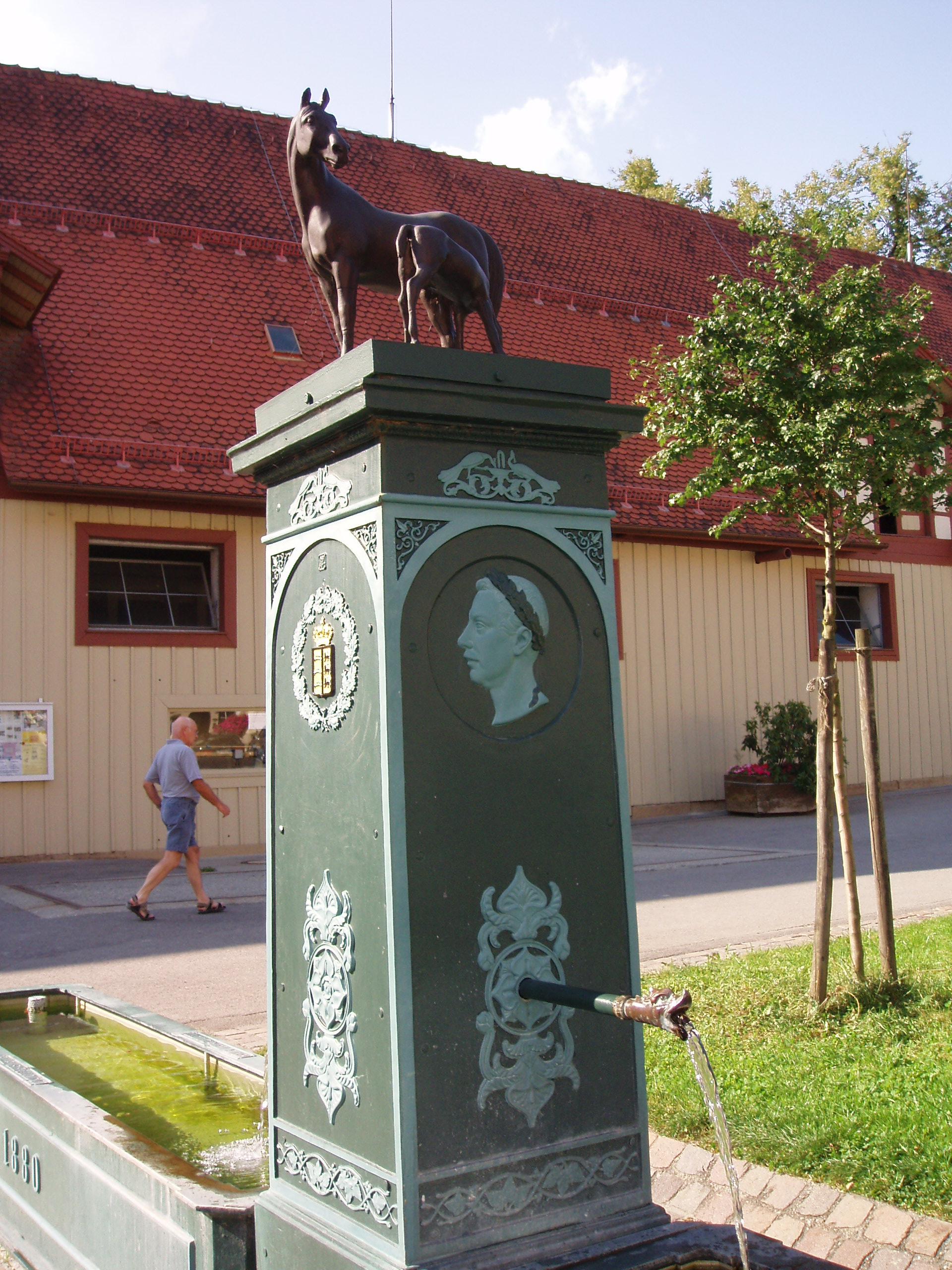
The "mare's well" horse fountain at Marbach, featuring an Arabian mare and foal.

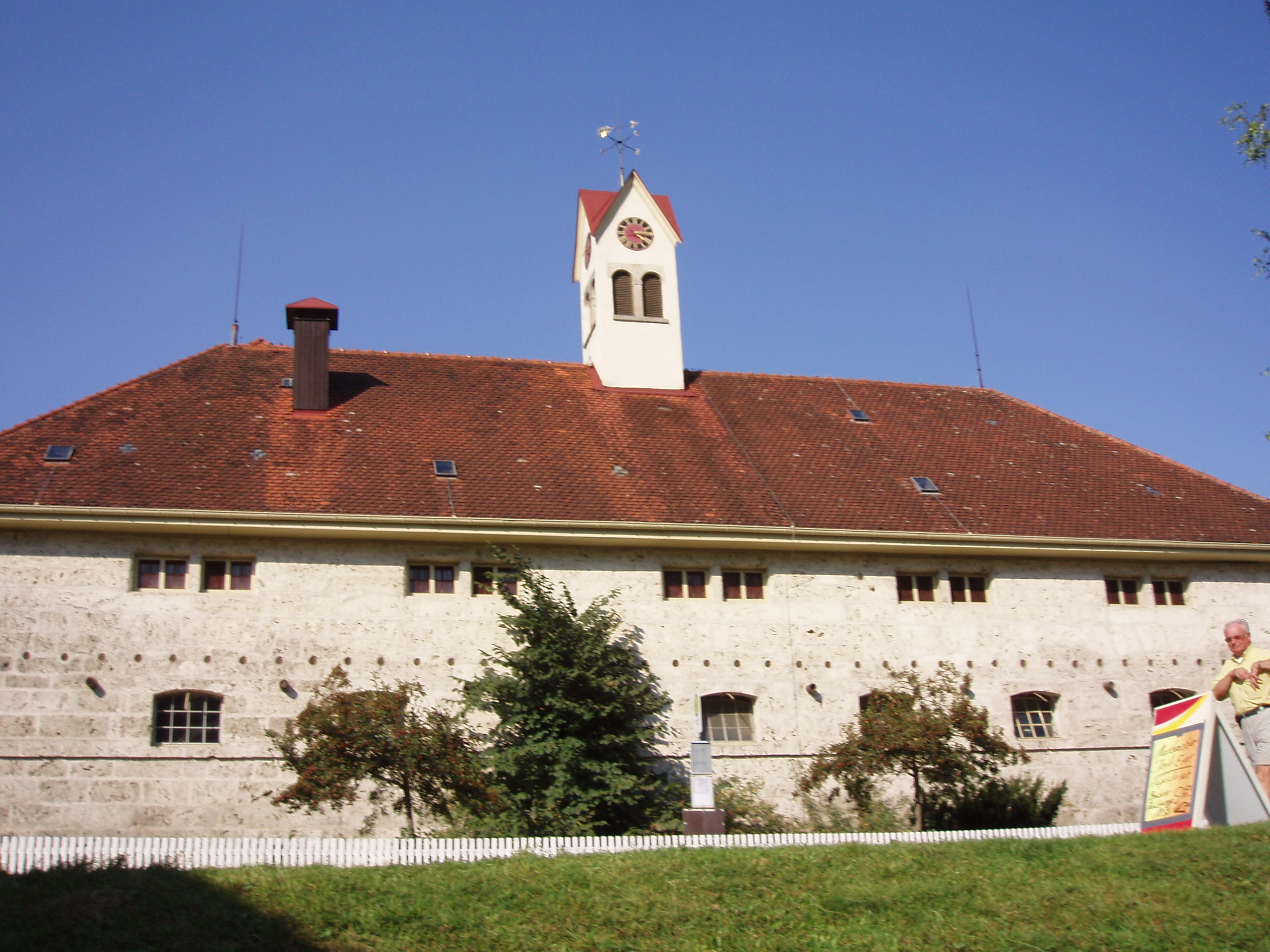
Marbach stables

The Marbach Stud, German: Haupt- und Landgestüt Marbach, is Germany's oldest state stud farm for horse breeding, has a history that dates back over 500 years. It is located in southwest Germany near Gomadingen in the Reutlingen district of Baden-Württemberg. The annual stallion parade is an internationally known attraction, and the stud hosts over 500,000 visitors per year. The stud also offers courses for those wishing to learn to ride or drive, as well as an instructor training program. Marbach is known for producing athletic horses with good temperaments, and has careful management practices, including that of allowing young, untrained horses the opportunity to grow in a natural setting conducive to their mental as well as their physical development.

Marbach was originally significant for its development of the ancestral bloodstock of several warmblood horse breeds, and today continues to produce the Württemberger. However, it is probably best known as the home stud of the Weil-Marbach Arabians. The majority of Arabian horses bred at Marbach are sold to private owners as personal riding horses, though some are also used in the sport of endurance riding. In addition to breeding Arabian and Württembergers, Marbach also stands stallions of the Black Forest Horse breed as well as a few Thoroughbreds, Haflingers and other heavy warmblood stallions. Horses bred at Marbach are performance tested before being allowed reproduce and are branded with a brand symbol called the Hirschgeweih.

== History ==
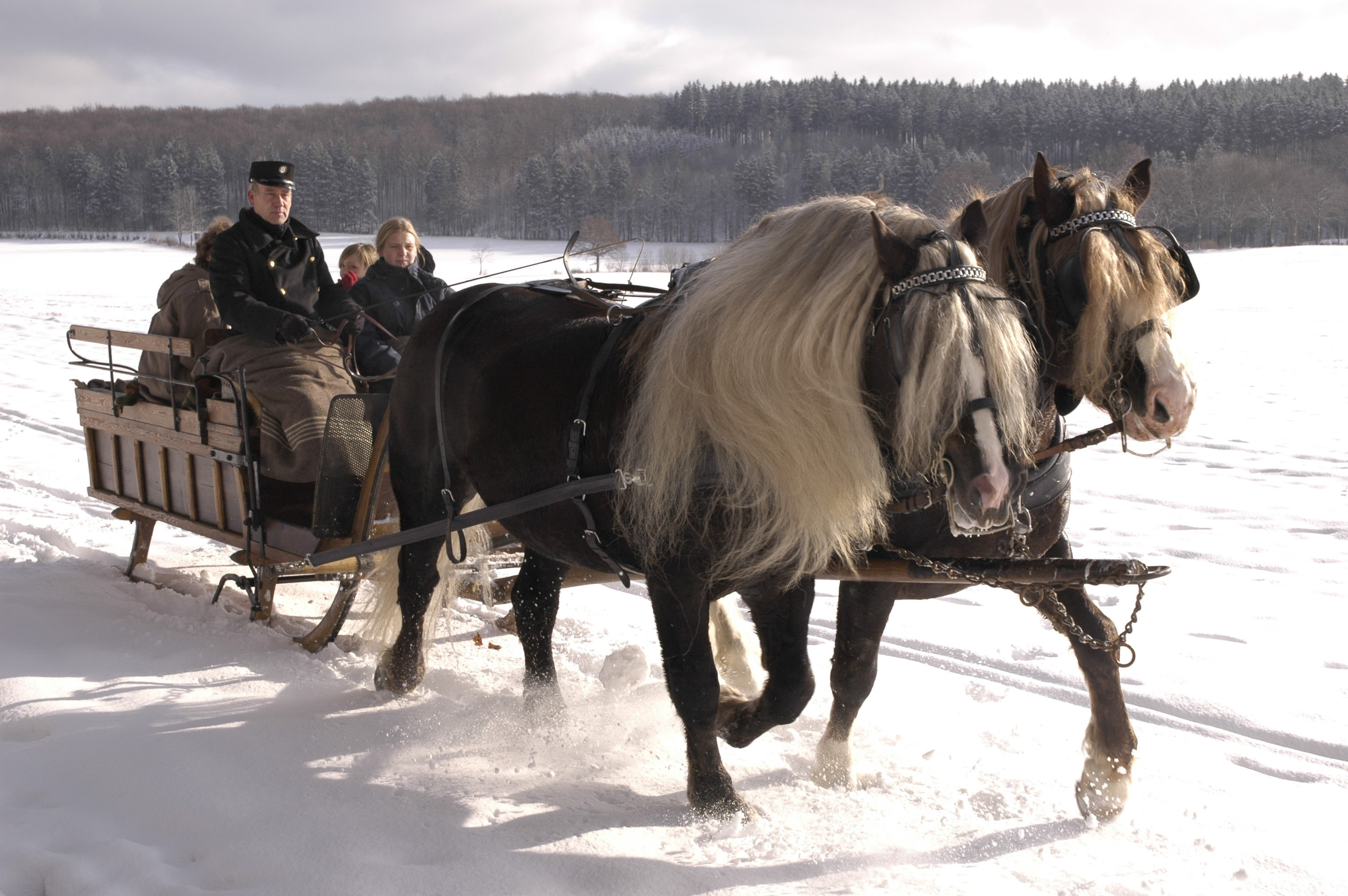
Black Forest Horses (Schwarzwälder Kaltblut)

Marbach was first established as a private stud between 1477, and 1480 by Graf Eberhard V. Christoph, Duke of Württemberg (r. 1550-1568) expanded the stud and in 1573, it was named a court and state stud, after the ruling Dukes realized a need for improvement in local horse breeds. During the 18th and 19th centuries, Marbach used Mecklenburger, Holstein, and English and Norman-bred horses to improve quality in local horses, while heavier breeds such as the Cleveland Bay, Yorkshire Coach Horse and Clydesdale were used to make a larger, more solid horse. Following World War II and the recognition that there was less need for work horses and a greater future in developing sport horses and general light riding animals, the stud added additional lines such as the Thoroughbred and Trakehner, with the Marbach stallion Julmond (1938–1965), a significant contributor of traits that transformed the Württemberger from a work horse into a sport horse.

== Weil ==
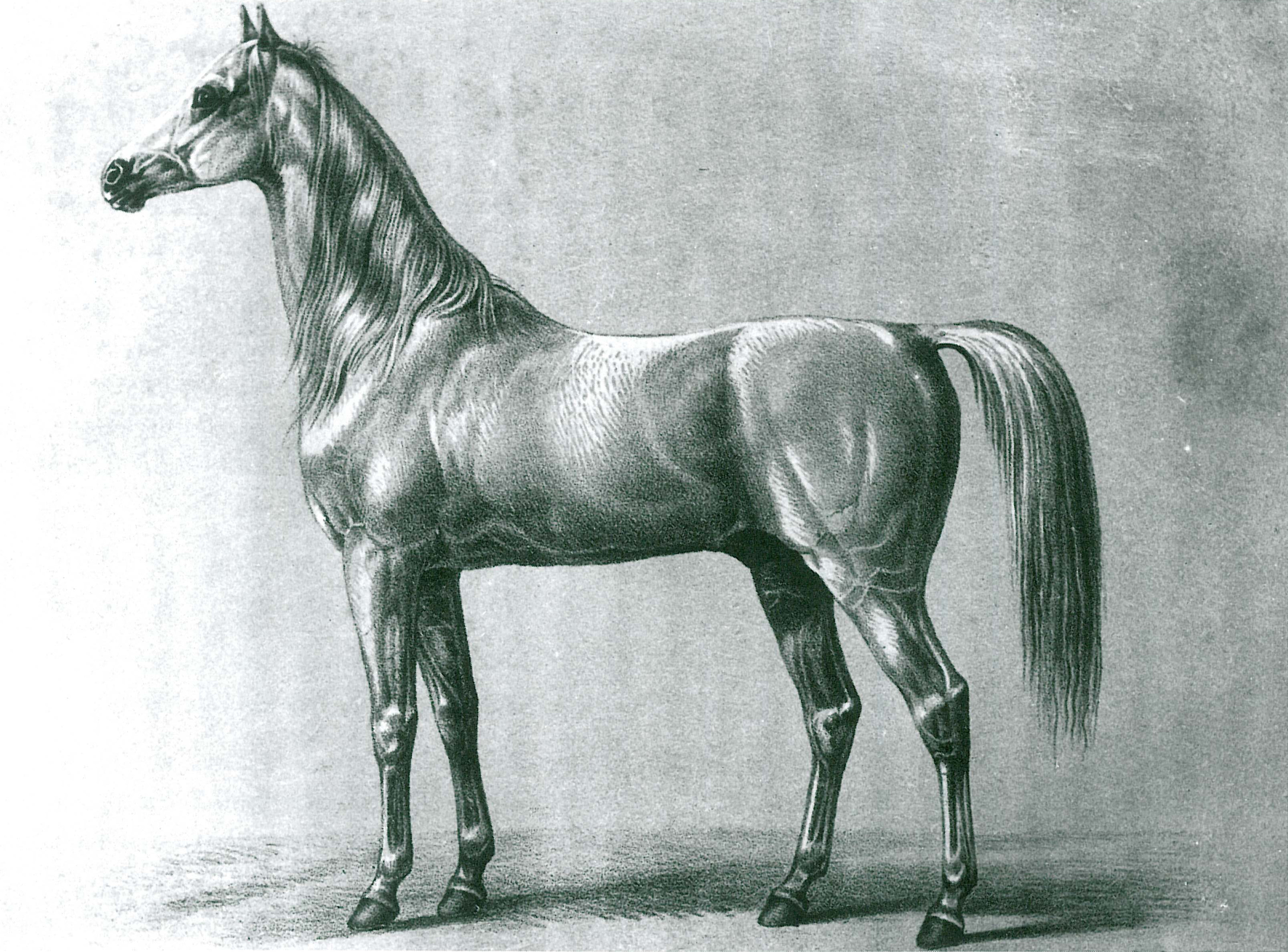
Bairactar

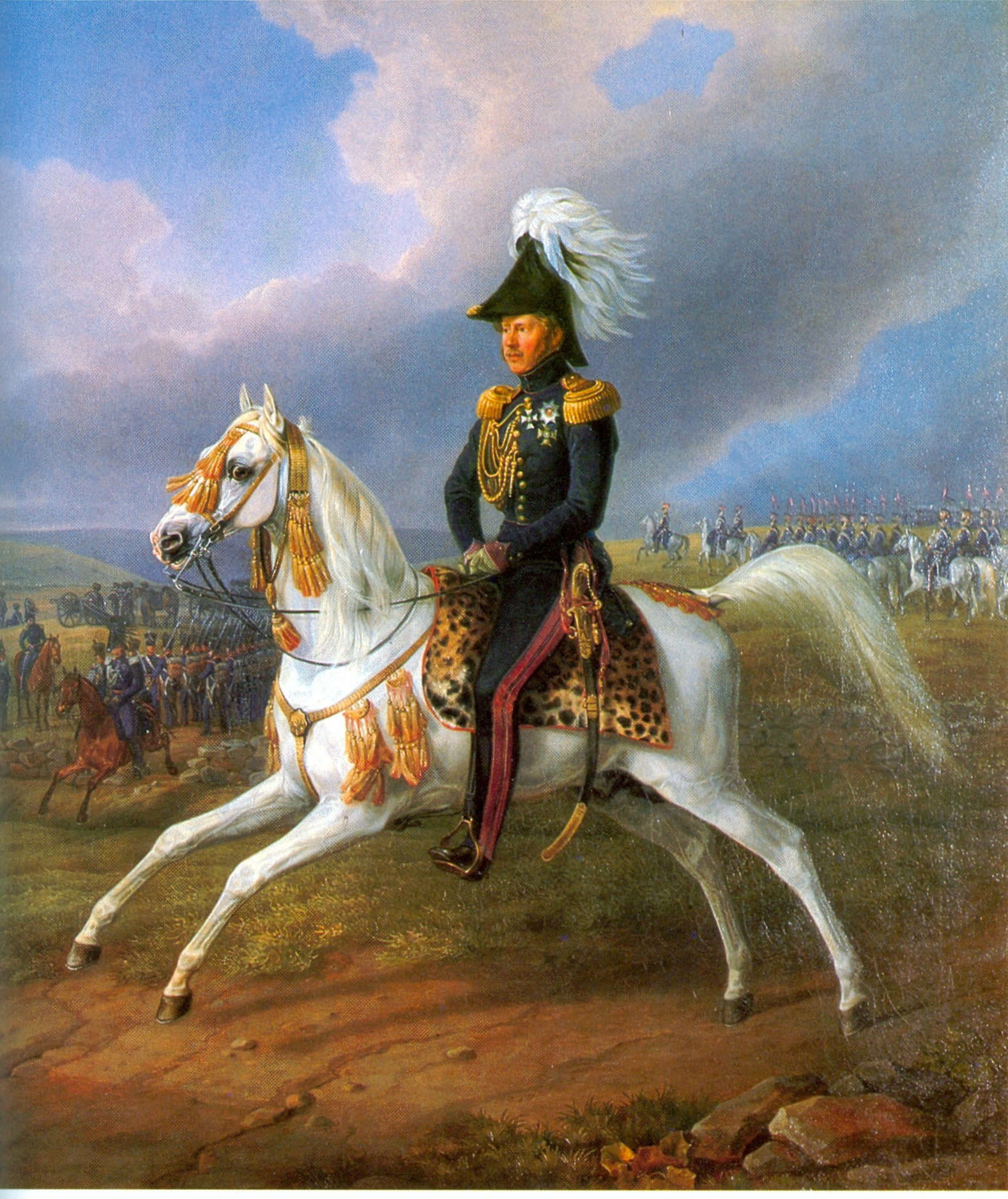
Wilhelm I

The Weil stud was founded in 1817 at Esslingen by King Wilhelm I of Württemberg for the purpose of breeding Arabian horses. Among the foundation horses was the mare Murana I 1808, whose dam line still continues at Marbach today. The stallions Bairactar, imported directly from the Arabian desert and his son Amurath I 1829, played a significant part in the development of the Arabian breed at Weil, and made major contributions to the breed throughout Europe, particularly on Arabian horses bred in Poland.

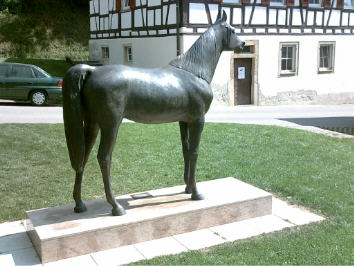
Statue of the Arabian stallion Hadban Enzahi at the Marbach Stud

== Weil-Marbach transition ==
While this establishment thrived though the 19th century, from 1890 on, it went into considerable decline and by the time the Weil herd was transferred from Princess Pauline zu Wied of Württemberg to the Marbach State Stud in 1932, only 17 purebred Arabians remained. To expand the breeding pool, Arabian horses from Poland were used, particularly those of the Ofir line such as the Witez II son Wisznu and the stallion Abu Afas. In 1955, the Arabian stallion Hadban Enzahi was imported from Egypt, along with some other breeding stock, and this infusion of new blood added to the foundation animals established the Weil-Marbach line of Arabians. Since the importation of Hadban Enzahi, the focus of Marbach shifted to Arabian breeding of strongly Egyptian bloodlines, though the older lines are also preserved.
