= Allain Gaussin =

French composer

Allain Gaussin (born 6 November 1943) is a noted French composer.

Gaussin was born in Saint-Sever-Calvados, Normandy. He is a laureate of the Conservatoire national supérieur de musique et de danse de Paris (CNSMDP) where he studied with Olivier Messiaen. He studied conducting with Louis Fourestier, piano with Hélène Boschi, and electroacoustic music with Pierre Schaeffer.

Gaussin taught orchestration from 2004 to 2011 at the music faculty of the Osaka University, and teaches composition at the American Conservatory in Fontainebleau.

== Selected works ==
- Camaïeux (1983) for electric ensemble
- Chakra (1984) for string quartet
- Années-Lumière (1992) for large orchestra
- Irisation-Rituel (Grand prix du disque 1995 of the Académie Charles Cros)
- Mosaïque céleste (1997), chamber concerto for eleven instruments

== Discography ==
- Eclipse, Ogive (for flute and harpsichord), Eau-Forte (collection MFA, disques Arpège-Calliope, 1983)
- Chakra for Arditti Quartet (collection MFA, disques Montaigne / Auvidis 1991)
- Irisation-Rituel, Camaïeux, Arcane, Salabert / Harmonia Mundi, 1995. Awarded Grand prix du disque (1995) by the Académie Charles Cros
- Ogive (flute and piano) Ensemble Triton II (disques REM 1996)
