= Hadban Enzahi =

Arabian stallion

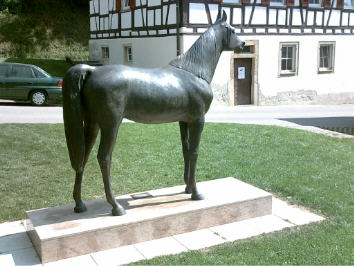
- Statue of Hadban Enzahi at the Marbach Stud
- Breed: Arabian
- Sire: Nazeer
- Grandsire: Mansour
- Dam: Kamla
- Maternal grandsire: Sheikh El Arab
- Sex: Stallion
- Foaled: 15 August 1952
- Died: 22 July 1975 (aged 22)
- Country: Egypt
- Color: Gray
- Breeder: Egyptian Agricultural Organization
- Owner: Marbach stud, Germany
- Last updated on: March 13, 2008.

Hadban Enzahi, foaled 15 August 1952 in El Zahraa, Egypt, and died of heatstroke on 22 July 1975, was a gray Arabian stallion imported from Egypt, who stood at the Marbach stud in Germany. Sired by Nazeer out of Kamla, Georg Wenzler brought him to Germany in November 1955, along with his half sister Nadya.

He sired many offspring over 19 seasons, many of which were exported worldwide and won numerous championships.

Made by German artist Ingo Koblischek, a life-size commemorative bronze statue of him stands in the grounds of Marbach Stud.

== Pedigree ==
Gamil Manial (RAS)
Mansour (RAS)
Nafaa El Sahira (RAS)
Nazeer (RAS)
Kazmeen (RAS)
Bint Samiha (RAS)
Samiha (RAS)
*Hadban Enzahi
Mansour (RAS)
Sheikh El Arab (RAS)
Bint Sabah (RAS)
Kamla (RAS)
Baiyad (RAS)
Samha(RAS)
Bint Samiha (RAS)
