= The Origin of Violence =

- Film poster
- L'Origine de la violence
- Directed by: Élie Chouraqui
- Screenplay by: Élie Chouraqui; Fabrice Humbert
- Based on: L'Origine de la violence by Fabrice Humbert
- Produced by: Élie Chouraqui; Alfred Hürmer
- Starring: Stanley Weber; César Chouraqui; Richard Berry; Michel Bouquet
- Cinematography: Dominique Gentil
- Edited by: Lorenzo Fanfani
- Music by: Cyril Etienne des Rosaies; Romain Poncet
- Production companies: L'Origine Productions; Integral Films
- Distributed by: Paradis Films (France)
- Release date: 25 May 2016 (France)
- Running time: 110 minutes
- Countries: France; Germany
- Languages: French; German
- Budget: $3.2 million
- Box office: $427.000

The Origin of Violence (French title: L'Origine de la violence) is a 2016 Franco-German drama film directed by Élie Chouraqui, based on the Prix Renaudot-winning novel of the same name by Fabrice Humbert. The film won the Best Narrative Audience Award at the Philadelphia Jewish Film Festival 36.

== Cast ==
- Stanley Weber as Nathan Wagner in 2014
- César Chouraqui as David Nathan Wagner in 1937 / Adrien Fabre in 1962
- Richard Berry as Adrien Fabre in 2014
- Miriam Stein as Gabi in 2014
- Catherine Samie as Clémentine Fabre in 2014
- Michel Bouquet as Marcel Fabre in 2014
- Romaine Cochet as Virginie in 1937
- Christine Citti as Marguerite Fabre in 1937
- Didier Bezace as The Father in 1937
- Jean Sorel as Charles Wagner in 2014
- Joseph Joffo as Kolb in 2014
- David Kammenos as Kolb in 1941
- Martin Peillon as Charles Wagner in 1937
- Gabriel Washer as Marcel Fabre in 1937
- Jeanne Cremer as Clémentine Fabre in 1937
- Lars Eidinger as Dr. Erich Wagner
- Nikola Kastner as Ilse Koch
- Matthias Gall as Karl Koch
- Vladislav Grakovskiy as Heinrich Himmler
- Christopher Reinhard as Martin Sommer
- Tino Ranacher as Deportee
