= Peter Rybar =

- Birth name: Peter Rybar
- Born: 29 August 1913; Vienna, Austria
- Died: 4 October 2002 (aged 89); Lugano, Switzerland
- Genres: Classical
- Occupation(s): Violinist, pedagogue
- Instrument: Violin
- Years active: 1930 to 1986

Peter Rybar (Vienna, 29 August 1913 — Lugano, 4 October 2002), was a Czech-Swiss violinist. Most of Rybar's recordings were produced by Concert Hall, Westminster and Le Chant du Monde, especially Robert Schumann's Violin Concerto (with the Orchestre de Chambre de Lausanne directed by Victor Desarzens) and other works by Schumann for violin and piano (with Hélène Boschi). Peter Rybar taught first at the Conservatory of Winterthur and then at the Conservatoire de Genève.
