= Thierry Mechler =

French organist

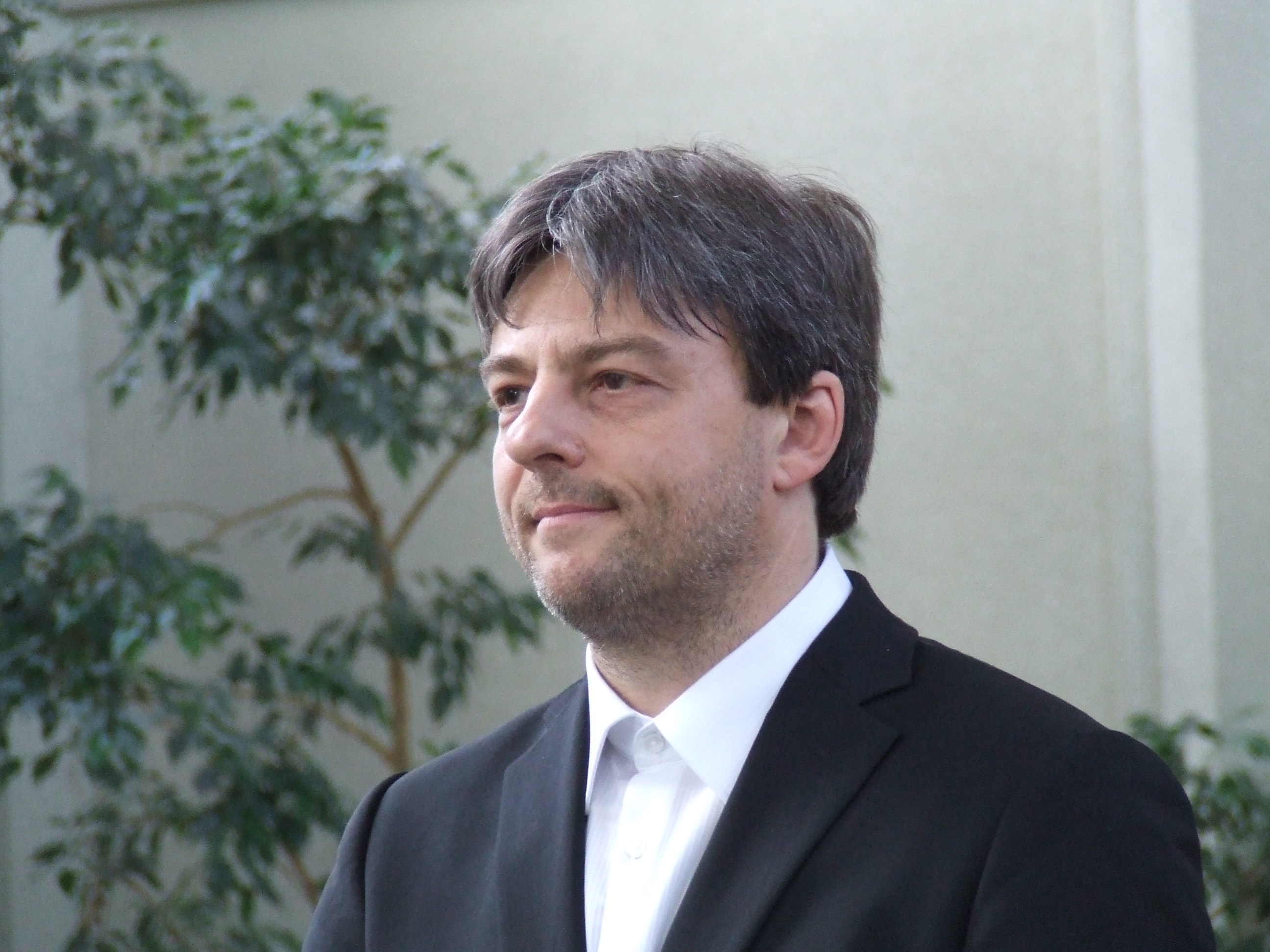
- Born: 1962 (age 62–63); Mulhouse, France
- Occupations: Classical organist; Music educator
- Awards: Ordre des Arts et des Lettres

Thierry Mechler (born 1962) is a French organist and organ and improvisation teacher at the Hochschule für Musik und Tanz Köln. He teaches future concert students and gives international masterclasses for students of improvisation, piano and organ playing.

== Biography ==
Thierry Mechler was born in Mulhouse in 1962 in Alsace. He learned the organ at 13 years old on the keyboards of his parish church. He studied music at Mulhouse, then at the conservatoire à rayonnement régional de Strasbourg in the organ class of Daniel Roth. At the same time, he studied piano with Hélène Boschi.

In 1984, he perfected his skills in Paris with Jacques Taddei for improvisation and with Marie-Claire Alain for interprétation.

He resides in Guebwiller with his wife, the German illustrator Suzanne Janssen-Mechler with whom he gives concerts, and his three children (2 sons, 1 daughter).

== Prizes ==
- 1981: First prize unanimously at the Paris International Organ Competition chaired by Rolande Falcinelli.
- 1985: 1st prize of excellency with the unanimous congratulations of the jury in Paris
- 1986: 1st prix of virtuosity à l’unanimité in Paris
- 1987: Honorary Medal of Composition
- 1991: European award in Dresden for his entire career

== Teaching ==
- 1986-1989: Organ and improvisation teacher at the Conservatoire d'Annecy
- 1997-98: Lecturer at the Essen Conservatory in Germany
- Since 1998: Professor of organ and improvisation at the Musikhochschule (CNSM) of Cologne.

== Organist ==
- Since 1984: Holder of the grand organs of the Prieuré de Thierenbach (68)
- 1991–1999: Holder of the grand organ of the primatiale Saint-Jean de Lyon
- 1992–1999: Organist and artistic counsellor of the auditorium Maurice-Ravel of Lyon
- Since 2001: Conservator of the grand organ of the Cologne Philharmonic Orchestra (Germany)

== Concertist ==
With the support of the rector of the basilica of Thierenbach, Canon Gérard Sifferlen, he created the Association des Amis de l'Orgue de Thierenbach (AOT) to promote the Organ of the Basilica by organizing sacred music concerts in the church. Today, he's the president of the association and rector Denis Simon is the vice-president. The AOT in partnership with the Haut-Rhin (Department) has organised "Musicales", recitals where Thierry Mechler played Bach, Vierne as well as personal compositions, alone or with his wife.

In March 2007 he founded the ensemble "Tonalis", which brings together various instrumentalists, soloists and conservatory teachers, on the occasion of a concert presenting Bach's concertos, given as part of the Festival of the Dominicans of Haute-Alsace.

== Discography ==
Numerous recordings testify to the art of Thierry Mechler, who also created his own label Tonalis Records in 2002.

Piano

- 4 concerti for piano (Johann Sebastian Bach) - Thierry Mechler
- Toccaten und Improvisationen - Thierry Mechler

Organ

- Fantasy and fugue in G minor (Jean-Sébastien Bach), 1991
- The Art of Fugue (Jean-Sébastien Bach), 1997, Walbeck organ
- 14 Sonatas for organ (Domenico Scarlatti), 2004, Callinet of Issenheim organ
- Goldberg Variations (Jean-Sébastien Bach), 2005, Cologne philharmony organ
- Chorals pour le temps de Noël (Jean-Sébastien Bach), 2005, (Fischer and Krâmer organs 1992) of the prieuré of Thierenbach
- Transcriptions for organ (Wolfgang Amadeus Mozart), 2006, Orgue Walcker of Waldkirch
- Le Saint Sacrement, Orgue et chant grégorien - Thierry Mechler and the monks' choir of Flavigny / La Procure, 2009

== Distinctions ==
- Chevalier de l'Ordre des Arts et des Lettres
