= Hélène Boschi =

Franco-Swiss pianist

- Born: 11 August 1917; Lausanne, Switzerland
- Died: 9 July 1990 (aged 72); Strasbourg, France
- Citizenship: Swiss, French
- Education: École Normale de Musique de Paris
- Occupation: Pianist
- Partner(s): I. Joachim, J-J Kantorow, G. Mounier, P. Rybar, M. Sadlo,
- Awards: Grand Prix du Disque (1952); Robert Schumann Prize (1975)

Hélène Boschi ([elɛn] [ˈboski]; 11 August 1917 – 9 July 1990) was a Franco-Swiss pianist, born in Lausanne. She studied with Yvonne Lefébure and Alfred Cortot at the Ecole normale de musique in Paris. Throughout her life she led a dual career as a teacher and as a performer.

She played the music of the 20th Century, Bartok, Dukas, Maurice Emmanuel, Janáček or Martinu. Luigi Dallapiccola dedicated his Quaderno Musicale di Annalibera (created in 1952), Fernando Lopes-Graça his 3rd Sonata (created in 1954) and Claude Ballif his 4th Sonata (created in 1963). She also gave the first performance of Karel Husa's Piano Concertino in Brussels (1954) which was dedicated to her. In 1955 Hélène Boschi premiered Jean-Louis Martinet's Prelude for Piano and Orchestra and in 1964 Louis Durey's Six pièces de l'automne 53 for piano.

Hélène Boschi performed Johann Sebastian Bach, François Couperin, Gabriel Fauré, Franck, Joseph Haydn, W-A Mozart, Robert Schumann. Rameau, K-M von Weber. Among her chamber music partners were Armand Angster, Gerard Caussé, Michel Debost, Irène Joachim, Annie Jodry, Jean-Jacques Kantorow, Étienne Péclard, Peter Rybar, Milos Sadlo. Hélène Boschi also formed with pianist Germaine Mounier, a piano duet with a vast repertoire, recording works by Mozart, Clementi, Debussy and Busoni.

From 1955 to 1965, as Soloist of the Radiodiffusion-Télévision Française (RTF) she performed many broadcast concerts. She played also with major orchestras in Europe (Czech Philharmonic, Leipzig Gewandhaus Orchestra, Chamber Orchestra of Berlin, Orchestre national de France, Concertgebouw Amsterdam, Orchestre Philharmonique de Strasbourg, etc.) and renowned conductors as Georges Enesco, Kiryl Kondrashin, Jean Martinon, Kurt Masur, Vaclav Neumann, Manuel Rosenthal, Kurt Sanderling, Karel Sejna, etc.

From 1960 to 1965, Hélène Boschi taught at the Ecole Normale de Musique de Paris. She led thereafter for twenty years (1965–1985) one of the top classes in piano at the Conservatory of Strasbourg. She also gave during 15 years masterclasses in Weimar. Among her students were Piotr Anderszewski, Dana Borsan, Claire Chevallier, Allain Gaussin, Alain Jomy, Thierry Mechler, Jean-Marie Sénia, Emmanuel Strosser and François Verry.

In 1975, Hélène Boschi received the Robert Schumann Prize for her interpretations of the composer born in the town of Zwickau.

== Discography ==
Boschi recorded throughout her career for several record companies: Le Chant du Monde, Supraphon, VEB Eterna. She was the first pianist to record the Sonatas of Padre Antonio Soler (1952, Grand Prix du disque) and the complete works for piano and chamber music of Clara Schumann (with Annie Jodry and Roland Pidoux).

== See also ==
List of classical piano duos (performers)
