= Louis Julien =

Louis Julien (October 14, 1955 - August 11, 2023) was a French actor.

== Biography ==
His father was the actor André Julien. His film credits include the lead role in Michel Drach's Parlez-moi d'amour (1975), and a character whose father is played by Alain Delon in Comme un boomerang, by José Giovanni.

He published his first novel, La Vandale, in 1985. In 2003, he published the novel Paris Aubusson Paris, which won the Prix du roman gay.

In the 2010s, he devoted himself to painting, exhibiting in a number of galleries.

== Partial filmography ==
=== Cinema ===
- 1971: Out 1 by Jacques Rivette
- 1975: Speak to Me of Love by Michel Drach
- 1976: Boomerang, by José Giovanni
- 1980: The Little Mermaid, by Roger Andrieux
- 1981: Le Roi des cons, by Claude Confortès
- 1982: Le Rat noir d'Amérique, short film by Jérôme Enrico
- 1983: Life Is a Bed of Roses by Alain Resnais
- 1985: Three Men and a Cradle by Coline Serreau
- 1988: Envoyez les violons by Roger Andrieux

=== Television ===
- 1973: Le Drakkar by Jacques Pierre

== Bibliography ==
- Louis Julien, La Vandale, éditions Mazarine, 1985, 210 p. (ISBN 2-86374-175-6).
- Louis Julien, Paris-Aubusson-Paris, CyLibris, coll. "Emmanuel Ménard présente", 2003, 115 p. (ISBN 2-84358-136-2).
- Louis Julien, Paris-Aubusson-Paris: ou Le Mauvais Garçon, Éditions gaies et lesbiennes, 2009, 125 p. (ISBN 978-2-35680-005-3).
- Louis Julien, Intrigues : tapuscrit du texte, Paris, Aux nouvelles écritures théâtrales, 2003 [1982].
