= Delphine Zentout =

French actress (born 1971)

Delphine Zentout (born 4 August 1971) is a French actress. Her film career began with the controversial Catherine Breillat film titled 36 Fillette (1988), a film about a sexually curious 14-year-old's affair with an aging playboy.

== Selected filmography ==
- 2011: three girls on the run
- 2008: The ex daughter of Christiane Spiero (TV movie)
- 2007: Mr Neuwirth, hang
- 2007: The Predators (TV movie)
- 2007: Surge
- 2006: The Clan Pasquier
- 2006: On the Road to Santiago
- 2005: The Way of Laura (soap opera)
- 2005: "The Behind the scenes" (an episode of the series Sauveur Giordano )
- 2005: New Life Romain
- 2005: The entertainers (theater)
- 2004: Justice is done
- 2004: Let's grandchildren
- 2004: Joséphine, ange gardien (1 Episode : "Sauver Princesse")
- 2004: Deadly Violence
- 2003: San-Antonio
- 2003: It Was a Small Garden
- 2002: Les Thibault (soap opera)
- 2002: He runs, he runs the ferret
- 2002: The Battle of Hernani (TV movie)
- 2001: "Portrait of a Killer" (one episode of A Woman of Honor )
- 2001: A Girl in the Blue
- 2000: Coronation Street (soap opera)
- 1999: Let Lucie faire!
- 1999: The Whiplash
- 1999: "Romeo and Juliet" (an episode of The Instit)
- 1998: Mrs. Four and Children
- 1998: Midnight Lace (an episode of the judge and cop Cordier )
- 1998: The Danger of Love
- 1997: The Time of Secrets
- 1997: "Funny Game" (an episode of the series The Judge is a Woman)
- 1996: The Censor school Epinal
- 1996: Deemed Innocence (an episode of the series Commissaire Moulin)
- 1996: Master Driver
- 1995: Dirty Laundry email family
- 1994: Farinelli
- 1994: Taboo
- 1994: One Day Before Dawn (TV movie)
- 1993: The Scarlet Eye
- 1993: Following the Chav
- 1993: The Unfinished Letter
- 1992: L'oeil écarlate
- 1992: The Tricks of Scapin (theater)
- 1991: The Year FM
- 1991: Port Bréac'h
- 1990: Nobody Loves Me
- 1989: The Hitch-hiker
- 1989: Hi Lobsters
- 1988: 36 Fillette
