= Christel Noir =

French author, screenwriter and artist

Christel Noir is a French author, screenwriter and artist. She received the Prix Montalembert for her first novel La Confession des anges. She also wrote the script for the TV series based on the novel. She paints under the name Soÿ and her work has been shown in national and international exhibitions.

== Bibliography ==
- Papa, j'ai encore raté l'amour (2004, with Julia Noir)
- La confession des anges (2011)
- La porte du secret (2015)
