= Dark Forest =

Dark Forest may refer to:

== Places and fictional locations ==
- Dark Forest, themed area at the Alton Towers Resort
- Dark Forest, room in the television game show Legends of the Hidden Temple

=== Fictional locations ===
- Dark Forest, afterlife in the Redwall fantasy novel series
- Dark Forest, forbidden area on the Hogwarts campus in the Harry Potter series
- Dark Forest, afterlife in the Warriors series by Erin Hunter

== Literature ==
- Dark Forest, (selva oscura) in the first line of Dante's Inferno
- The Dark Forest, Chinese science-fiction novel by Liu Cixin, sequel to The Three-Body Problem
- The Dark Forest, a novel by Hugh Walpole

== Other uses ==
- Dark Forest (film), a South Korean horror film
- "Dark Forest", episode of the TV show A Haunting
- darkforest, a Go playing computer program being developed by Facebook
- Dark forest hypothesis, a solution to the Fermi paradox that states that civilizations remain silent to prevent interstellar warfare

== See also ==
- Forest (disambiguation)
- Dark (disambiguation)
- Black Forest (disambiguation)
