= The Best Way to Walk =

- Theatrical release poster
- Directed by: Claude Miller
- Written by: Luc Béraud; Claude Miller
- Produced by: Mag Bodard; Jean-François Davy
- Starring: Patrick Dewaere; Patrick Bouchitey; Christine Pascal; Claude Piéplu
- Cinematography: Bruno Nuytten
- Edited by: Jean-Bernard Bonis
- Music by: Alain Jomy
- Distributed by: AMLF
- Release dates: 3 March 1976 (France); 15 January 1978 (U.S.)
- Running time: 82 minutes
- Country: France
- Language: French
- Box office: $13,793 (2008 French reissue)

The Best Way to Walk (French: La meilleure façon de marcher) is a 1976 French film directed by Claude Miller, his directorial debut. It stars Patrick Dewaere, Patrick Bouchitey, Christine Pascal, Claude Piéplu and Michel Blanc.

== Plot ==
Marc and Philippe are two teenage counselors at a summer vacation camp in the French countryside in 1960. Marc is very virile, while Philippe is more reserved. One night, Marc surprises Philippe dressed and made-up like a woman. He responds by continually humiliating Philippe. Despite their late-adolescent rivalries and sexual confusion, each achieves an awakening.

== Cast ==
- Patrick Dewaere as Marc
- Patrick Bouchitey as Philippe
- Christine Pascal as Chantal
- Claude Piéplu as Camp director
- Marc Chapiteau as Gérard
- Michel Blanc as Raoul Deloux
- Michel Such as Léni
- Franck d'Ascanio as Hervé
- Nathan Miller as kid with glasses

== Reception ==
Jan Dawson wrote in Sight and Sound that "Miller surrounds his dramatic scenes of pride and prejudice with a rich humour that balance affection and misanthropy; his characters are faintly ridiculous long before they are humbled, and their absurdity stems in large from their attempts to conceal an average dose of inconsistency beneath a monolithic rhetoric."

Film critic Tom Milne said that Miller's treatment of the complex relationship between the two young men is "astonishly assured and all the more remarkable in that it is at once very subtle, yet also extremely tough; his magnificent first film reveals a great sensitivity to psycho–sexual tensions and also hints at the class antagonisms informing the character's actions; it also has the advantage of strong natural performances and some delightful humour."

In his review for Time Out, Chris Petit stated that "Miller handles the contrasts of his script with assurance, especially those between group conformity and private individual feelings; only at the end does his touch falter, because until then his perception of emotional nuances effectively masks the stereotypical equations he makes between sex, class and, to a lesser extent, politics; but overall it's a highly assured first feature."

Fernando Trueba of El País observed that "Miller has built a compact, rigorous, measured film, where nothing has been left to improvisation or chance, full of details, subtle, of small nuances that affect, above all, the composition of the characters, both their psychology and the direction of the actors." He also praised the acting of Dewaere and Bouchitey as "absolutely exceptional." He concluded that the film is "amazing, its language is direct, precise and forceful; Miller avoids anecdotal or environmental notes that can distract the central plot."

== Awards ==
The film won the César Award for Best Cinematography, and was nominated for Best Film, Best Actor, Best Director, Best Screenplay, Dialogue or Adaptation and Best Sound.

== See also ==
- Cinema of France
- List of French-language films
