= Black Forest, Nevada =

Ghost town in Elko County, NV, US

Coordinates: 39°55′20″N 115°52′23″W

Black Forest is an extinct town in Elko County, in the U.S. state of Nevada.

== History ==
The first settlement at Black Forest was made in 1872. A post office was established at Black Forest in 1926, and remained in operation until 1943. The community was named for the dark character of the forest near the original town site.
