= Emmanuel Bove =

French novelist

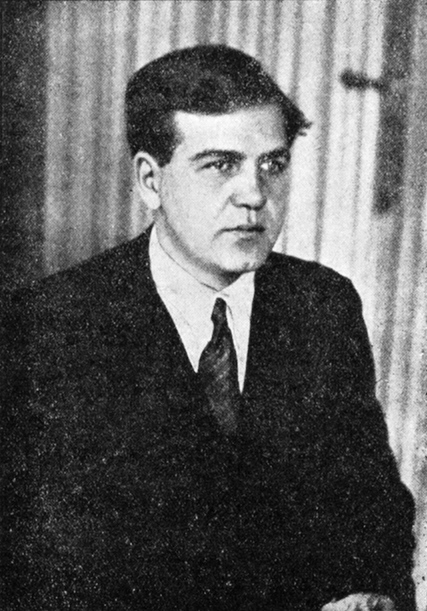
- Emmanuel Bove c. 1928
- Born: Emmanuel Bobovnikoff; 20 April 1898; Paris, France
- Died: 19 July 1945 (aged 47)
- Occupation: Novelist
- Writing career
- Pen name: Emmanuel Bove, Pierre Dugast, Jean Vallois
- Language: French

Emmanuel Bove (20 April 1898 – 19 July 1945) was a French writer, who also published under the pseudonyms of Pierre Dugast and Jean Vallois.

== Life and career ==
Emmanuel Bove was born Emmanuel Bobovnikoff on 20 April 1898 in Paris to a Jewish father who migrated from Ukraine and a Belgian mother. After his father remarried, Bove grew up with his father and stepmother, Emily Overweg, who was the wealthy niece of English writer Emily Jane Pfeiffer, and daughter of the British Consul in Shanghai.

He studied at the École alsacienne in Paris and the Collège Calvin in Geneva. At the age of 8, he decided to become a novelist.

In 1921, he married Suzanne Vallois and moved to the suburbs of Vienna. There he began his writing career, publishing numerous popular novels under the pseudonym Jean Vallois. He returned to Paris in 1922 and worked as a journalist. His work came to the attention of Colette, who helped him publish his first novel under his own name, Mes amis (My Friends) in 1924. The novel became a success and he consistently published until the Second World War, winning the prix Figuière in 1928.

In 1925, Bove left his wife Vallois, and two children, to marry a young socialite, Louise Ottnsooser. Bove continued to write, and in 1933, published his first crime novels. The first, La toque de Breitschwantz, he published under the pseudonym of Pierre Dugast. The second, under his own name, was Le Meurtre de Suzy Pommier. Le toque de Breitschwantz was republished as La fiancée du violoniste under the name Emmanuel Bove in 1987.

In 1936, Bove published a translation of Charles Dickens' A Tale of Two Cities in installments in the French Communist magazine Regards; his translation wasn't published in book form until 1991.

In 1940, he was mobilized as a laborer and hoped to be able to flee to London. He refused to publish any works during the Occupation. He managed to escape to Algiers in 1942, where he wrote his three final novels: le Piège, Départ dans la nuit and Non-lieu.

He returned to Paris in poor health and died in Paris on 19 July 1945, due to cachexia and heart failure.

== Works ==
- Mes amis, novel 1924
- Le Crime d'une nuit, novella 1926
- Armand, novel 1927
- Bécon-les-Bruyères, novel, 1927
- La Coalition, novel 1927
- La Mort de Dinah, novel 1928
- Coeurs et Visages, novel 1928
- L'Amour de Pierre Neuhart, novel 1928
- Une illusion, novella 1928/1929
- Monsieur Thorpe (Les deux masques), 1930
- Journal – écrit en hiver, novel 1931
- Un Raskolnikoff, novella 1932
- Un célibataire, novel 1932
- Le Meurtre de Suzy Pommier, crime novel 1933
- La toque de Breitschwantz, crime novel 1933, published under the pseudonym Pierre Dugast.
- Le Beau-fils, novel 1934
- Le Pressentiment, 1935 (adapted into the film Premonition in 2006)
- Adieu Fombonne, novel 1937
- La Dernière Nuit, novel 1939
- Le Piège, novel 1945
- Départ dans la nuit, novel 1945
- Non-lieu, novel 1946
- Mémoires d'un homme singulier, 1987

== Works available in English ==
- My Friends, trans. Janet Louth; Manchester: Carcanet, 1986. ISBN 0856356433
- Armand, trans. Janet Louth; Manchester; New York, NY : Carcanet, 1987. ISBN 0856356395
- Winter's Journal, trans. Nathalie Favre-Gilly; Evanston, Ill. : Marlboro Press/Northwestern, 1998. ISBN 0810160463
- The Murder of Suzy Pommier, trans. Warre B. Wells. Boston : Little, Brown, 1934.
- The Stepson, trans. Nathalie Favre-Gilly; Marlboro, Vt. : Marlboro Press, 1991. ISBN 1568970048
- Quicksand, trans. Dominic Di Bernardi; Marlboro, Vt. : Marlboro Press, 1993. ISBN 0910395691
- Night Departure; and No Place, trans. Carol Volk; New York : Four Walls Eight Windows, 1995. ISBN 0941423913
- A Singular Man, trans. Dominic Di Bernardi; Marlobor, Vt. : Marlboro Press, 1993. ISBN 0910395942
- A Raskolnikoff, trans. Mitchell Abidor; Red Dust, 2015. ISBN 9780873761086
- Henri Duchemin and His Shadows, trans. Alyson Waters; New York Review of Books Classics, 2015. ISBN 9781590178324
