= 36 Fillette =

1988 film by Catherine Breillat

- Theatrical release poster
- Directed by: Catherine Breillat
- Screenplay by: Catherine Breillat; Roger Salloch
- Based on: 36 Fillette by Catherine Breillat
- Produced by: Emmanuel Schlumberger; Valérie Seydoux
- Starring: Delphine Zentout; Étienne Chicot; Olivier Parnière; Jean-Pierre Léaud; Berta Domínguez D.; Jean-François Stévenin
- Cinematography: Laurent Dailland
- Edited by: Yann Dedet
- Music by: Maxime Schmitt
- Production companies: French Productions; CB Films
- Distributed by: Gaumont
- Release date: 23 March 1988 (France)
- Running time: 88 minutes
- Country: France
- Language: French

36 Fillette (known as Virgin or Junior Size 36 in English) is a 1988 French erotic drama film directed by Catherine Breillat, based on her 1987 novel of the same name. The film stars Delphine Zentout, Étienne Chicot and Oliver Parniere, with Jean-Pierre Léaud, Berta Domínguez D. and Jean-François Stévenin. It follows a sexually curious and rebellious 14-year-old (played by then-16-year-old Zentout) who has an emotionally charged and dually manipulative relationship with an aging playboy. Breillat is known for films focusing on sexuality, intimacy, gender conflict and sibling rivalry. Breillat has been the subject of controversy for her explicit depictions of sexuality. Zentout had many topless, nude and explicit scenes in the film.

== Plot ==
Lili, a 14-year-old, is caravan camping with her family in Biarritz. She is self-aware and holds her own in a café conversation with a concert pianist she meets, but she has a wild streak, and she's testing her powers over men, finding that she does not always control her moods or actions, and she's impatient with being a virgin. She sets off with her brother to a disco, latching onto an aging playboy who is himself hot and cold to her. She is ambivalent about losing her virginity that night, willing the next, and determined by the third. The playboy's mix of depression and misogyny ends their unconsummated affair, leaving Lili to hunt elsewhere at the campground. She eventually finds an awkward teen her own age, and they clumsily share their first time together.

== Cast ==
- Delphine Zentout as Lili
- Étienne Chicot as Maurice
- Olivier Parnière as Bertrand
- Jean-Pierre Léaud as Boris Golovine
- Berta Domínguez D. as Anne-Marie
- Jean-François Stévenin as the father
- Diane Bellego as Georgia
- Adrienne Bonnet as the mother
- Stephane Moquet as Gi-Pe
- Cécile Henry as Laeticia
- Michel Scotto di Carlo as Stéphane
- Anny Chasson as Mme Weber
- Jean-Claude Binoc as M. Weber
- Christian Lafitte as le conducteur
- Christian Andia as Doorman 'Opium'

== Production ==
Catherine Breillat revealed that Delphine Zentout turned 16 just three days before they started shooting the film: "It was a miracle, because when I cast her I had never asked her age, or her birthday. If she had not had her 16th birthday three days before we started production, I would not have been able to show the movie around the world, because in a lot of countries it is against the law to show explicit images of a girl who is not yet 16."

== Reception ==
On review aggregator website Rotten Tomatoes the film has a score of 86% based on reviews from 7 critics.

Roger Ebert of the Chicago Sun-Times gave the film 3.5 stars out of 4, and wrote, "Its whole delicate existence depends on the performance by Zentout, a 16-year-old in her acting debut. She gives a brave and convincing performance".
