= Black Forest (2010 film) =

2010 film

- Directed by: Gert Steinheimer
- Starring: Johanna Klante; Nikola Kastner
- Release date: 15 April 2010
- Country: Germany
- Language: German

Black Forest is a 2010 German thriller film directed by Gert Steinheimer. It was released on 15 April 2010 in German cinemas.

== Plot ==
Two couples from a large city go on vacation to an isolated farmhouse in the Black Forest. The men discover an old TV and try to repair it, to watch football games. This is not successful. However, one after the other sees things on the TV screen, related to the other's life. One finds the driver, who drove the group at the beginning of the film to the house, before the agreed pick up. He sees three corpses. Only Eva survived and was able to escape to the village. Also seen on the ghostly TV is the spirit of a child named Anne Marie, who had died some years ago on the farm.

== Cast ==
- Johanna Klante as Eva
- Nikola Kastner as Sabine
- Adrian Topol as Mike
- Bernhard Bulling as Jürgen
- Andreas Hoppe
- Hans Joachim Weiser
- Mela Mselmani
- Christian Begyn
- Katharina Herrmann

== Background ==
The film was mostly shot on the Wunderlehof near Hinterzarten in Breisgau-Black Forest. The final scene was filmed at Breitnau.

The wooden masks, which can be seen several times in the movie, are worn during the Swabian-Alemannic carnival from Carnival Association Forest witches in Rudenberg, a suburb of Titisee-Neustadt.

The television station TV southern Baden broadcasts are seen from the TV several times. Actor Hans-Joachim Weiser usually plays in the Alemannic stage in Freiburg. Principal photography was completed in September 2007.
