= Black Forest Observatory =

Geophysical observatory in Germany

Coordinates: 48°20′N 8°20′E

Black Forest Observatory (BFO) or Observatorium Schiltach is a geophysical observatory owned and operated by the Karlsruhe Institute of Technology and the University of Stuttgart. It is located near Wolfach in the Black Forest region of Baden-Württemberg, in southwest Germany. The observatory is in the mine, named Anton which was abandoned and then converted into the observatory in 1972.

== Research Topics ==
The following reaech topics are covered:

- Seismology
- Gravimetry
- Earth Tides
- Short-term sub-daily variations of Earth's rotation
- Long-period Earth's rotation
