= Black Forest Horse =

German breed of draft horse

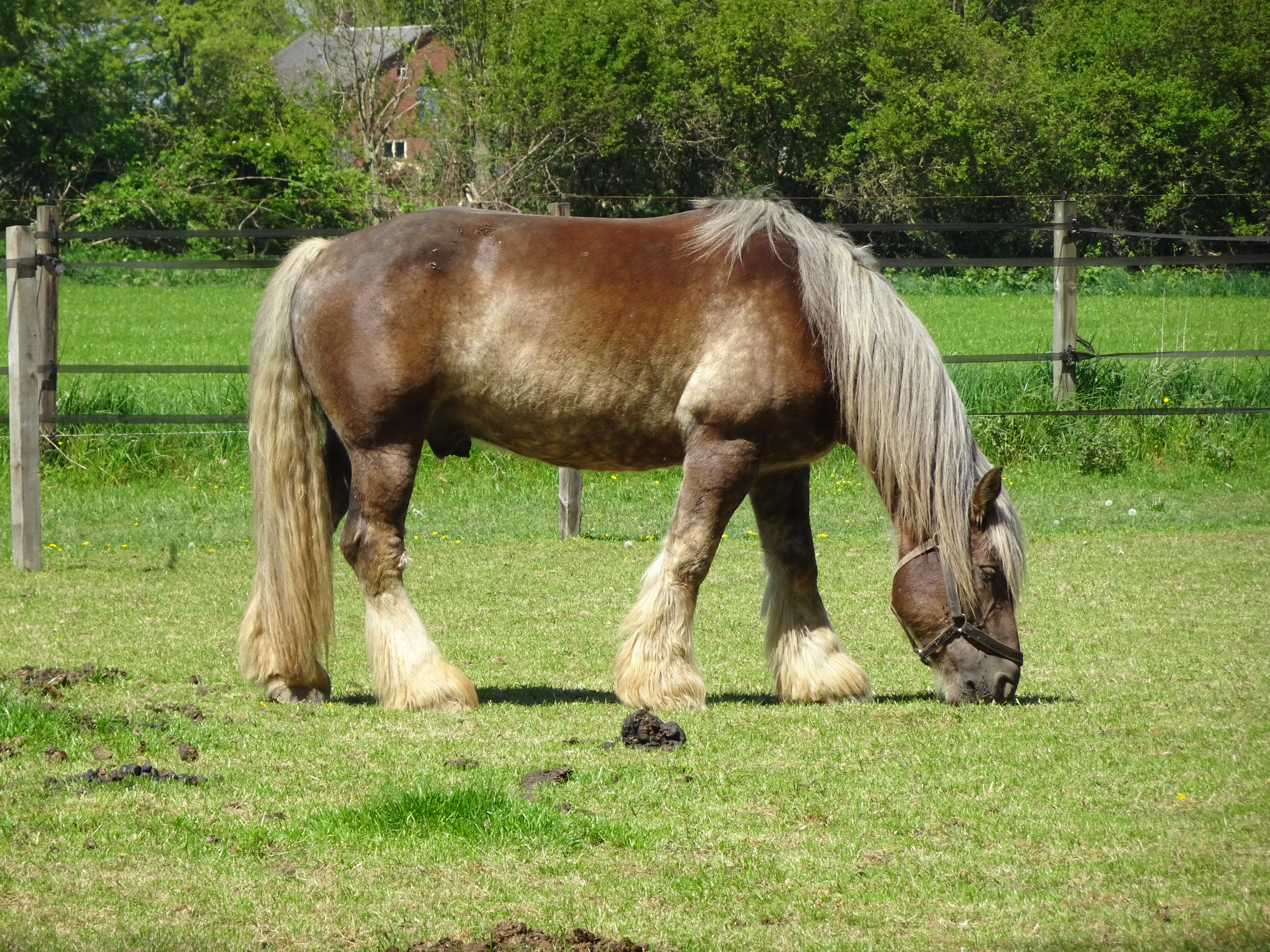

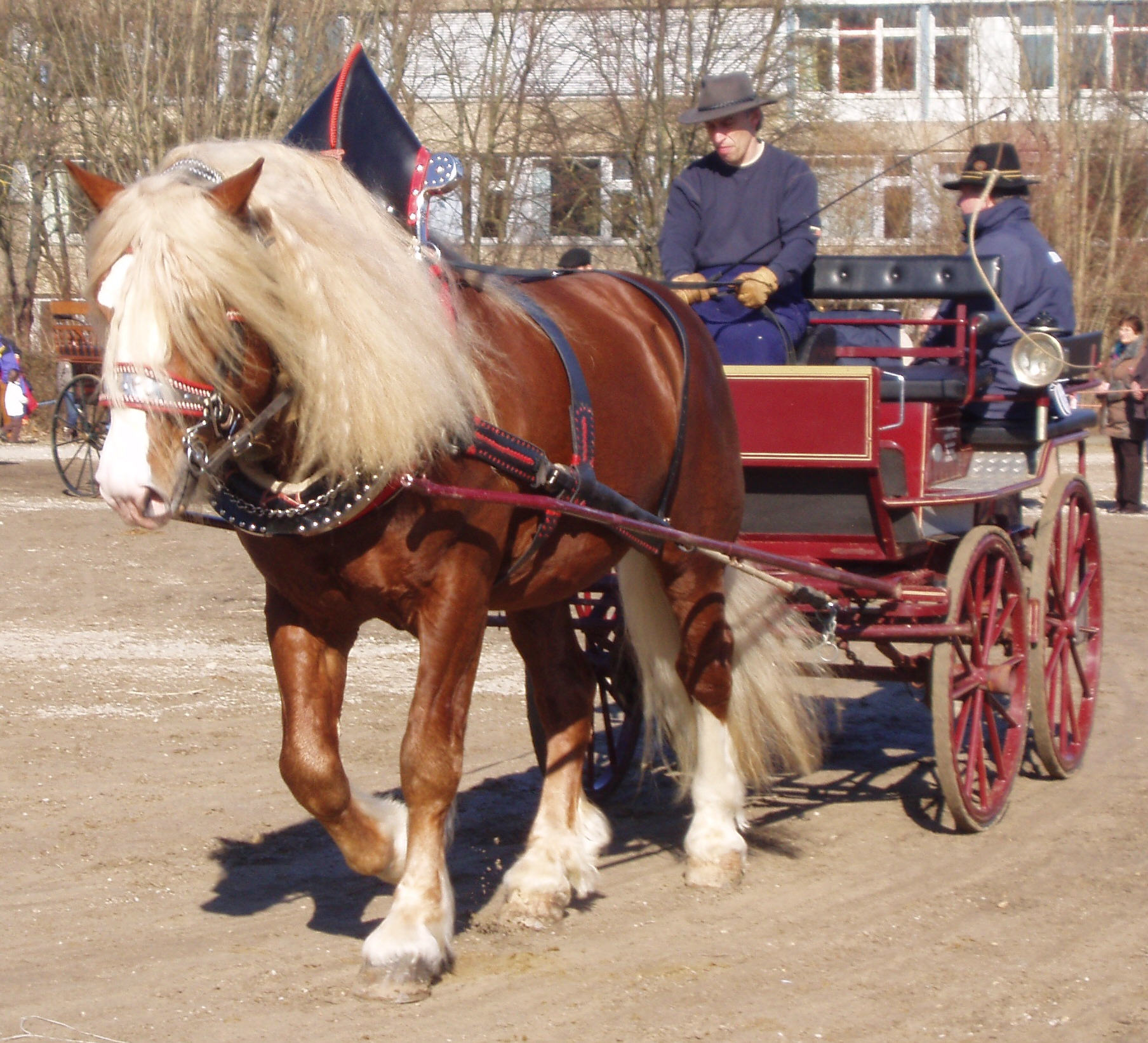
- Conservation status: FAO (2007): endangered; GEH: endangered
- Other names: Black Forest Coldblood; Schwarzwälder Kaltblut; Schwarzwälder Fuchs; St. Märgener Fuchs
- Country of origin: Germany
- Distribution: Baden-Württemberg
- Use: draft; harness; riding

Traits
- Weight: 500–600 kg
- Height: Male: 150–160 cm; Female: 148–156 cm
- Colour: chestnut

Breed standards
- Schwarzwälder Pferdezuchtgenossenschaft e.V.

The Black Forest Horse (German: Schwarzwälder Kaltblut) is an endangered German breed of light draft horse from the Black Forest of southern Germany.

== Characteristics ==
The Black Forest Horse is a draft horse of light to medium weight, well muscled and with a short and powerful neck. The head is short and dry, the shoulders sloped, and the croup broad and muscular. The legs are clean, without feathering, and the hooves broad and strong.

The Black Forest Horse is almost always chestnut with a flaxen mane and tail, though black, bay and grey are occasionally seen. The coat varies from pale to very dark, sometimes almost black; this, with a pale or silvery mane, is the coloring called in German Dunkelfuchs, "dark chestnut". Intentional selection for flaxen chestnut coloring began in 1875. In a study of 250 horses of the breed published in 2013, two were found to carry silver genes, but because they were chestnut, the silver was not expressed; it was thought to have been introduced by outcrossing to some other breed in the past.

== Breed history ==
Horse breeding in the Black Forest – in what is now Baden-Württemberg – is documented from the early fifteenth century in the records of the Abbey of Saint Peter in the Black Forest. A type of heavy horse, the Wälderpferd, was used for logging and farm work; it is conjectured that the Black Forest Horse derives from it. The main area of breeding lay between the northern Hotzenwald to the south and the Kinzigtal to the north. Breeding was concentrated round the monasteries of St. Peter and of St. Märgen; for this reason it was formerly known as the St. Märgener Fuchs.

A breed association, the Schwarzwälder Pferdezuchtgenossenschaft, was started in Sankt Märgen in 1896, and a stud-book was begun in the same year. In 1935, in the Nazi period, it was merged into the general stud-book for Baden. This was restarted after the War, in 1947, under the French administration. The Schwarzwälder Pferdezuchtgenossenschaft was re-founded in the 1990s.

After the end of the Second World War, there were more than 1200 breeding mares registered. With the mechanisation of agriculture and of transport, demand for working horses fell rapidly, and by 1977 the number of mares had fallen below 160. In 2007 its conservation status was reported by the Food and Agriculture Organization of the United Nations as "endangered". In 2017 a population of 88 stallions and 1077 mares was reported; in 2019 the breed was listed by the Gesellschaft zur Erhaltung alter und gefährdeter Haustierrassen in its category III, gefährdet, "endangered".

A number of stallions stand at stud at Marbach Stud, where artificial insemination is also available.

== Uses ==
The Black Forest Horse was originally bred for work in agriculture and forestry; it is now used in harness and, more and more often, as a riding horse.

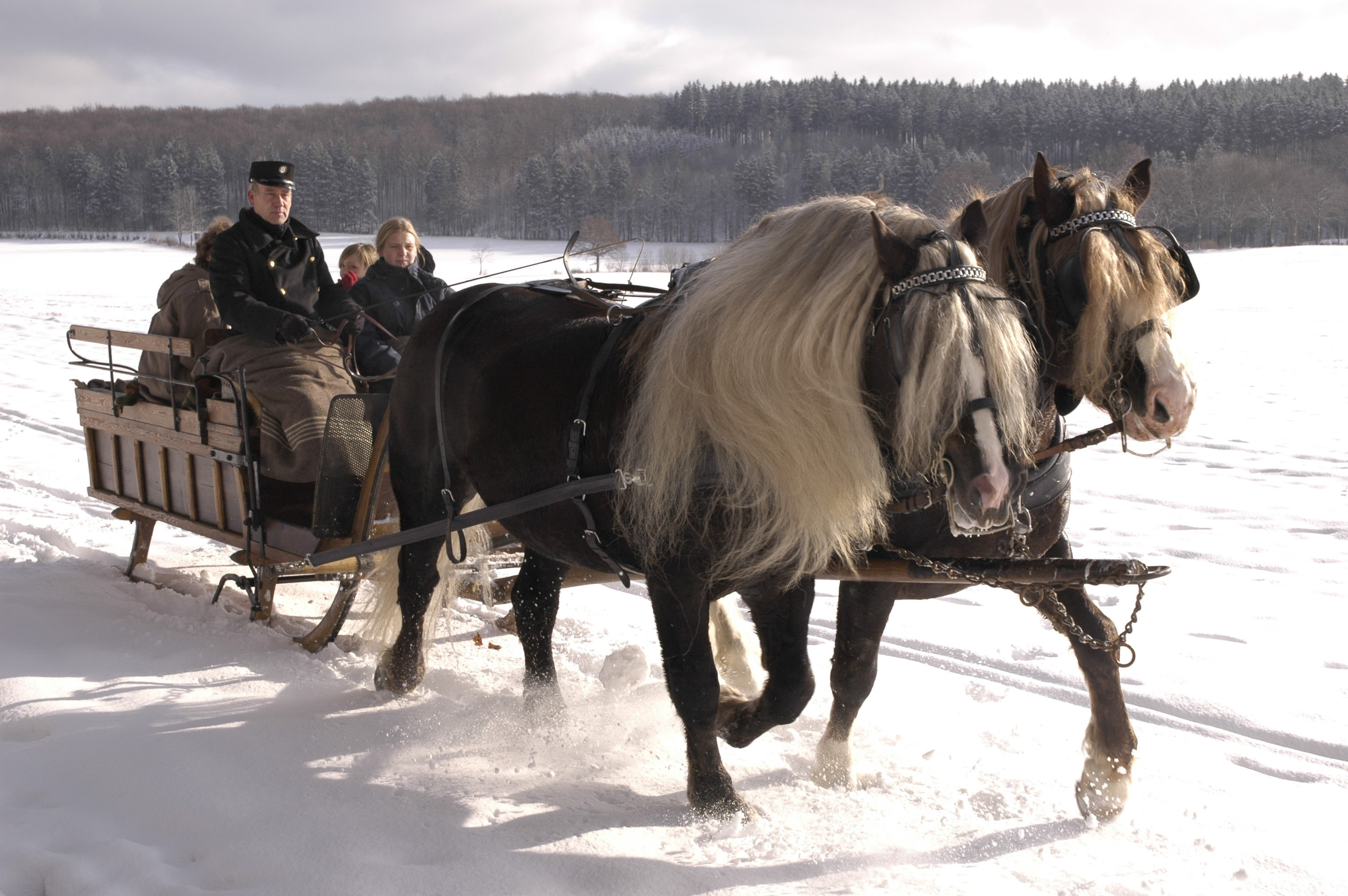
Pulling a sled

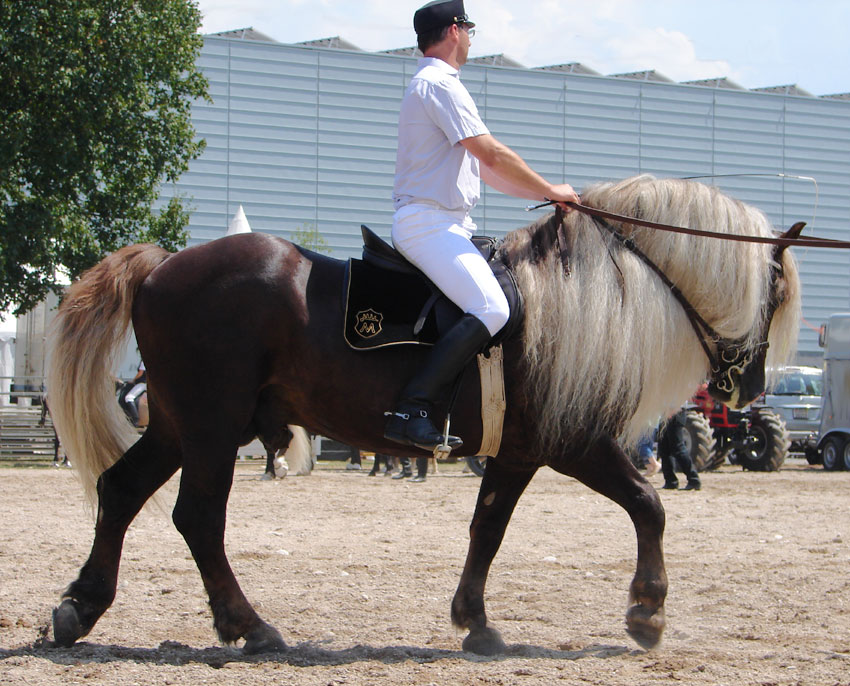
A stallion at the Marbach Stud

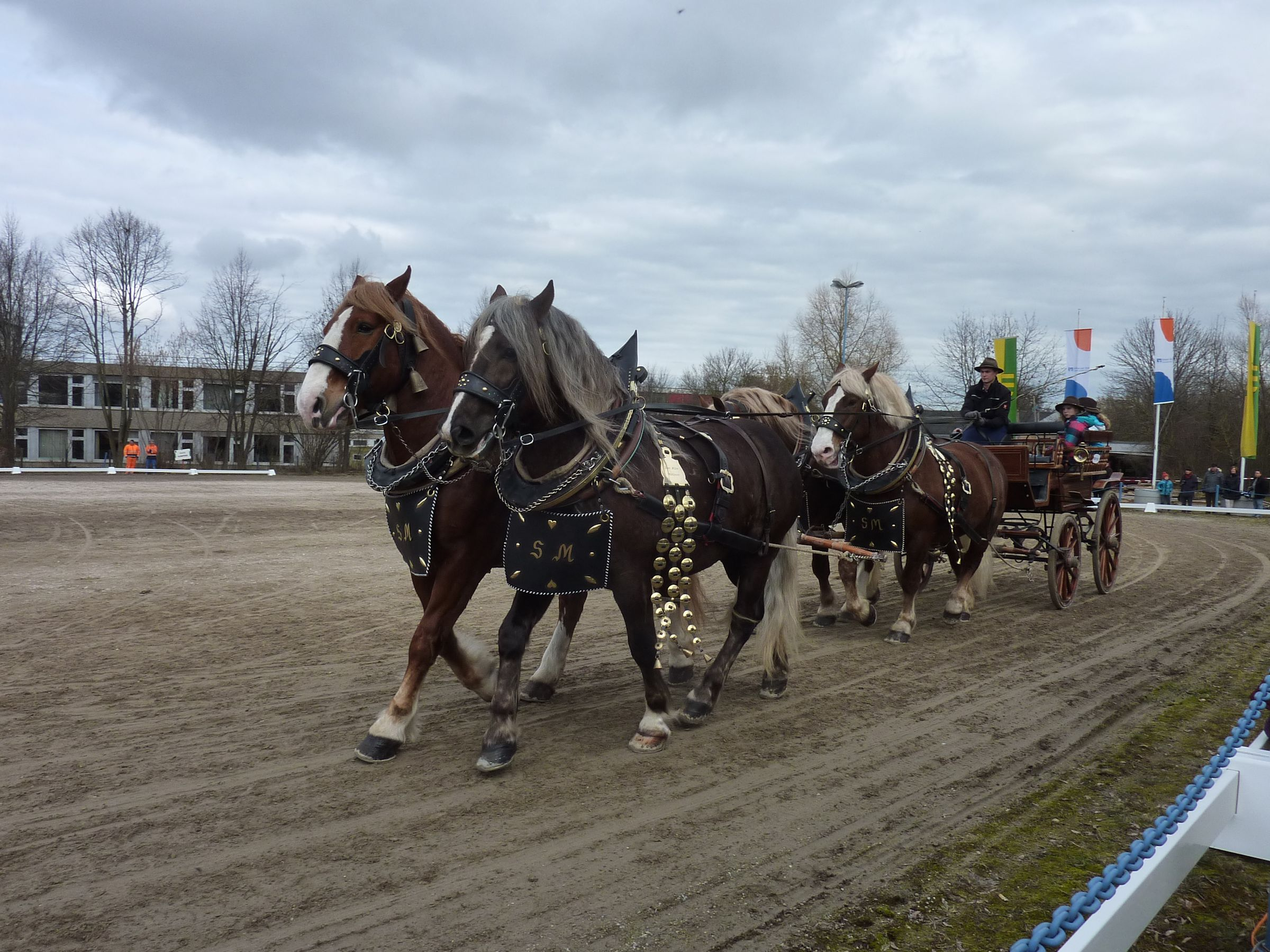
A four-in-hand at Bernhausen in 2014

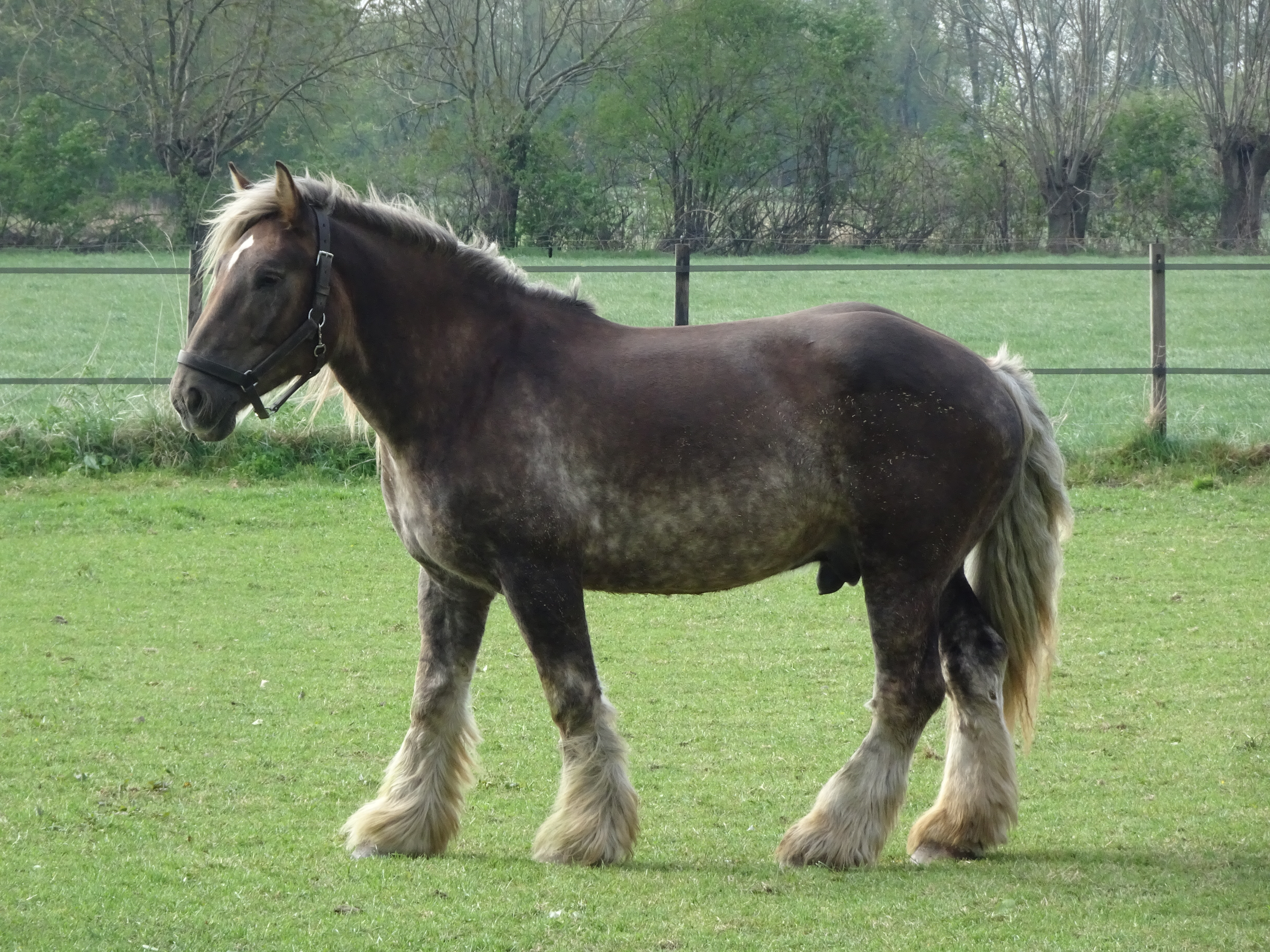
The dark chestnut coloration (Dunkelfuchs)
