= The Little Thief =

- Directed by: Claude Miller
- Written by: François Truffaut; Luc Béraud; Annie Miller; Claude Miller; Claude de Givray
- Produced by: Claude Berri; Jean-Louis Livi; Alain Vannier
- Starring: Charlotte Gainsbourg; Didier Bezace; Simon de La Brosse
- Cinematography: Dominique Chapuis
- Edited by: Albert Jurgenson
- Music by: Alain Jomy
- Distributed by: AMLF
- Release date: 21 December 1988 (France)
- Running time: 103 minutes
- Country: France
- Language: French
- Box office: $1,055,416 (USA)

The Little Thief (French: La Petite Voleuse) is a 1988 French drama directed by Claude Miller. It is based upon an unfinished script by François Truffaut. Truffaut died before being able to direct the film himself. The film had 1,834,940 admissions in France. Set in the French countryside after the end of World War II, it tells the story of a 15-year-old girl abandoned by her parents, who is looking for love and independence but succumbs to stealing and sleeping with men.

== Plot ==
Janine lives with her uncle and aunt, who have little sympathy for her as her mother left her to go with a lover to Italy and she never knew her father. She dreams of luxury, stealing American cigarettes and expensive underwear from shops. When found out, she leaves to become a live-in maid for the Longuets, a rich and friendly young couple. Tired after a long day's work, in the cinema she falls asleep on the shoulder of Michel, a married man in his forties keen on poetry and music. They start an affair, but he also tries to improve her culture and encourages her to study shorthand-typing.

At her course she sees a young intruder robbing the office, but does not inform on him. This is Raoul, who waits outside for her and they too start an affair. He wants money to buy a motor bike for racing, and Janine supplies it by robbing her employers and their guests during a dinner party. The two young criminals go on the run, ending up living rough beside the sea. There Janine is arrested, and sent to a school for young offenders. She and another girl escape, but Janine is now wanted and has nowhere to go. She is also pregnant. After making an appointment with an illegal abortionist, in the cinema she sees a newsreel of soldiers off to the war in Indochina. Among them is Raoul, so she does not keep the appointment and an end caption says that her baby was coming on well.

== Cast ==
- Charlotte Gainsbourg as Janine Castang
- Didier Bezace as Michel Davenne
- Simon de La Brosse as Raoul
- Clotilde de Bayser as Severine Longuet
- Raoul Billerey as Oncle André Rouleau
- Chantal Manlier as Tante Léa
- Nathalie Cardone as Mauricette
- Renée Faure as Mère Busato
- Chantal Neuwirth as The farmer
- Catherine Arditi as School director
- Dominique Besnehard
- Jacky Nercessian

== Release ==
The Little Thief was released in 1988 in France.
