= Jane B. par Agnès V. =

- Directed by: Agnès Varda
- Written by: Agnès Varda
- Starring: Jane Birkin
- Cinematography: Nurit Aviv; Pierre-Laurent Chénieux
- Edited by: Marie-Josée Audiard; Agnès Varda
- Music by: Harry Manfredini
- Distributed by: Capital Cinéma
- Release date: 1988
- Running time: 99 minutes
- Country: France
- Language: French

Jane B. par Agnès V. (transl. Jane B. by Agnès V.) is a 1988 French essay film directed by Agnès Varda and starring French-English actress Jane Birkin. The film was conceived when Birkin admitted to Varda she was apprehensive about turning 40 and Varda told her it was a beautiful age and the perfect time to make a portrait of Birkin's life.

The film mixes interviews with Birkin about her past and current life with small vignettes where she takes on roles that either she or Varda are interested in seeing her play.

== Synopsis ==
In Varda's own words

It all began with a letter Jane Birkin wrote me after seeing Vagabond. Written in a moment of emotion, it was illegible. Chicken scratch. I asked her to come decipher for me. We sat in the kitchen. We talked about our children. Mathieu was just over 14. Lou was four. Charlotte was 16. We decided to go to the park the following Sunday. We were walking along when she suddenly said "It's terrible. I'm going to be 40!" I said, "Don't be silly. It's a wonderful age. Perfect time to do your portrait. That's how it began.

I suggested to this vivacious and lively woman that we do the opposite of those tributes to deceased actresses that show excerpts from their films and interviews. I said, "We'll show excerpts of films you haven't made, films we've made up, and we'll fabricate some interviews."

It's a surprise portrait, in which Jane plays many roles, including herself, with a variety of partners. She was a good sport. She was funny, strange, magnificent, moving. It's variations on a variable and varied woman.

== Production ==
The film has a sister project in Kung Fu Master.

Charlotte Gainsbourg, Jane Birkin's daughter, later admitted to disliking both the filming of Jane B. par Agnès V. and Kung Fu Master as Varda and her film crew remained camped in her home for a year in order to complete the projects.

== Reception and release ==
In 2015 both Kung Fu Master and Jane B. par Agnès V. were acquired for U.S. distribution by Cinelicious Pics. The films enjoyed a brief theatrical release before being streamed on the movie streaming service Fandor. Varda expressed frustration at the film's limited release, saying "I can get the Palme d’Or, but I can’t get exhibition, so it’s a contradiction."

The film was re-released in North America in August of 2020 by The Criterion Collection as part of a box set featuring the complete films of Agnès Varda.
