= Andrew Birkin =

English film director and screenwriter

- Born: Andrew Timothy Birkin; London, England, United Kingdom
- Occupations: Film director, screenwriter
- Years active: 1972–present
- Spouse: Karen Birkin
- Children: 5, including David and Anno Birkin
- Mother: Judy Campbell
- Relatives: Jane Birkin (sister); Kate Barry (niece); Charlotte Gainsbourg (niece); Lou Doillon (niece)

Andrew Birkin (/ˈbɜːrkɪn/ BUR-kin) is an English screenwriter and film director.

== Early life and education ==
Birkin is the only son of Lieutenant-Commander David Leslie Birkin (grandson of the lace manufacturer and railway director Sir Thomas Birkin, 1st Baronet) and his wife, actress Judy Campbell. One of his sisters was actress and singer Jane Birkin. Birkin was educated at Elstree School and Harrow School. At the former he was remembered by a teacher as being "one of the naughtiest boys ever to have passed through Elstree" and his record at Harrow was no better.

== Career ==
He left school at the age of 17 to work as a mail boy at 20th Century Fox's London office, graduating to Elstree Studios as a production runner in 1963 on Man in the Middle and The Third Secret. After hitch-hiking and freight-jumping across America in 1964, he returned to England in 1965 and began work as a runner on Stanley Kubrick's 2001: A Space Odyssey, but soon became Kubrick's location scout. By the summer of 1966, Kubrick had promoted Birkin to Assistant Director on Special Effects; Birkin later proposed the shooting and colour transposition of aerial footage for the 'Jupiter and Beyond the Infinite' sequence. Kubrick dispatched him to Scotland with cameraman Jack Atcheler and a 65mm Panaflex camera bolted to the floor of an Alouette helicopter; but Atcheler soon quit the enterprise, deeming Birkin to be reckless. Birkin continued alone and shot most of the resulting footage himself. In 1967 Birkin supervised the shooting of 'The Dawn of Man' front projection plates in the Namib Desert.

After working as First Assistant Director to the Beatles on Magical Mystery Tour in 1967, Birkin served as Location Manager on Play Dirty in Spain before again working for Stanley Kubrick, this time as his assistant director and location scout on his unmade epic of Napoleon. Following second unit directing work on Melody, Birkin began writing scripts for producer David Puttnam, including The Pied Piper (1971) for director Jacques Demy, Slade In Flame (1974) for the rock band Slade (which won the Vision Award at the 2007 MOJO Awards, and was described as the "Citizen Kane of rock musicals" by BBC film critic Mark Kermode), and an unmade adaptation of Albert Speer's Inside the Third Reich for Puttnam and Paramount, which involved a year's consultation with Speer in 1971/72.

Having worked on an adaptation of Peter Pan for NBC in 1975, Birkin conceived and wrote The Lost Boys (1978), a three-part mini-series for the BBC about Peter Pan's creator J. M. Barrie, which won him writing awards from the Writers Guild of Great Britain and the Royal Television Society. The critic Sean Day-Lewis wrote in The Daily Telegraph, 'I doubt if biography has ever been better televised than in this sensitive and beautifully crafted masterpiece, and I am quite sure such excellence is beyond any other television service in the world.' The BBC's Director-General Sir Ian Trethowan called it 'a landmark in television drama'. Birkin has also written a biographical account of Barrie's relationship with the Llewelyn Davies family, J. M. Barrie and the Lost Boys (1979; 2nd edition 2003), described by The Oxford Companion to Children's Literature as 'the most candid and perceptive biography to have been written of Barrie'. Birkin also hosts Barrie's official website on behalf of the Great Ormond Street Hospital, to whom he donated his Barrie/Llewelyn Davies/Peter Pan archive in 2004.

In 1980, Birkin won a BAFTA award and an Academy Award nomination for his short film Sredni Vashtar, based on the short story by Saki, which he wrote, produced and directed for 20th Century Fox. In 1984 he wrote the shooting script for The Name of the Rose (in which he also had a small acting role), and in 1988 he wrote and directed Burning Secret, based on the novel by Stefan Zweig, for which Birkin was nominated for a Golden Lion award at the 45th Venice Film Festival, as well as winning the Young Jury prize for Best Film at the Brussels Film Festival in 1989. In 1993, Birkin wrote and directed The Cement Garden, based on the novel by Ian McEwan, which was nominated for a Golden Bear and for which he won the Silver Bear for Best Director at the Berlin Film Festival, as well as Best Film at several film festivals, including Dinard, Fort Lauderdale, and Birmingham. In 1998 he collaborated with Luc Besson on the script of The Messenger: The Story of Joan of Arc, and in 2004 co-wrote the screenplay for Perfume: The Story of a Murderer.

In 2013, Taschen published a selection of his photographs and an autobiographical essay in Jane & Serge: A Family Album. In 2017 he wrote an adaptation of Peter Pan for Radio France, and in 2022, Albin Michel published an expanded version of his Taschen book, "Serge Gainsbourg & Jane Birkin, L'album de famille intime".

== Personal life ==
Birkin has four sons and a daughter. David Birkin (born 1977), artist and photographer, is his eldest son, followed by Anno Birkin (1980–2001), poet and musician, and Ned Birkin (born 1985), whom Birkin directed in The Cement Garden. He is married to artist Karen Birkin, with whom he has a daughter, Emily Jane (born December 2008) and a son, Thomas Bernie (born April 2011). Two of his nieces are actresses: Charlotte Gainsbourg, who also appeared in The Cement Garden, and Lou Doillon.

He lives on the Llŷn Peninsula in North Wales.

== Filmography ==
- The Third Secret (1964) (production runner)
- The Pied Piper (1972) (writer)
- Slade in Flame (1975) (writer, Mojo Vision Award winner, 2007)
- Peter Pan (1976) (co-writer)
- The Thief of Baghdad (1978) (writer)
- The Lost Boys (1978) (writer, won Royal Television Society Award for Best Writer, Writers Guild of Great Britain Award)
- Omen III: The Final Conflict (1981) (writer, associate producer)
- Sredni Vashtar (1981) (writer, producer, director, winner of BAFTA Award for Best Short Film, 1981; nominated for an Academy Award for Best Short Film, Live Action)
- King David (1985) (co-writer)
- The Name of the Rose (1986) (co-writer, actor)
- Burning Secret (1988) (writer, director; winner of Young Jury Prize, Brussels Film Festival, 1989)
- Salt on Our Skin (1992) (co-writer with Bridget Gilbert; director)
- The Cement Garden (1993) (writer, director; winner of Silver Berlin Bear for Best Director, 1993; nominated for Golden Berlin Bear; winner of the Golden Hitchcock at the Dinard Festival of British Cinema; nominated for Best Film at Mystfest)
- The Messenger: The Story of Joan of Arc (1999) (co-writer with Luc Besson)
- Perfume: The Story of a Murderer (2006) (co-writer)

== Books ==
- Author, J. M. Barrie and the Lost Boys (Constable, 1979; Revised Edition: Yale University Press, 2003)
- Author, Jane & Serge: A Family Album (Taschen, 2013)
