= Slogan (film) =

1969 film by Pierre Grimblat

- Theatrical release poster
- Directed by: Pierre Grimblat
- Written by: Francis Girod; Melvin Van Peebles; Pierre Grimblat
- Produced by: Francis Girod
- Starring: Serge Gainsbourg; Jane Birkin; Andréa Parisy; Juliet Berto; Daniel Gélin
- Cinematography: Claude Beausoleil
- Edited by: Françoise Garnault; Jacques Witta
- Music by: Serge Gainsbourg
- Production companies: Orphée Arts; Hamster Productions
- Distributed by: Cocinor
- Release date: 27 July 1969 (France)
- Running time: 90 minutes
- Country: France
- Language: French

Slogan is a 1969 French satirical romantic comedy-drama film co-written and directed by Pierre Grimblat. It stars Serge Gainsbourg and Jane Birkin in their first film together. The film marked the beginning of the 13-year relationship between Gainsbourg and Birkin.

== Plot ==
Serge Fabergé is a 40-year-old director who leaves his pregnant wife Françoise to attend an advertising award festival in Venice. There, he meets Evelyne, a young British woman, and initiates an affair. Evelyne eventually leaves him for another man.

== Cast ==
- Serge Gainsbourg as Serge Fabergé
- Jane Birkin as Evelyne
- Juliet Berto as secretary
- Daniel Gélin as Evelyne's father
- Henri-Jacques Huet as M. Joly
- James Mitchellas as Hugh
- Andréa Parisy as Françoise
- Gilles Millinaire as Dado
- Roger Lumont as Serge's lawyer (uncredited)
- Robert Lombard as motorist (uncredited)
- Kate Barry as Serge's daughter (uncredited)

== Production ==
Grimblat initially wanted American actress Marisa Berenson to play the role of Evelyne, but decided on an English actress instead.

Grimblat was nominated for an award in Venice for a Renault advert, and because nobody knew what he looked like, he asked Serge Gainsbourg to pretend he was Grimblat and collect the award, so that he could film the ceremony and use the footage in Slogan.

The filming of Slogan was temporarily delayed due to the 1968 riots in France.

Filming took place between June 26 and August 16, 1968 in Venice, Italy. It was on this film that Serge Gainsbourg and Jane Birkin met. At first, Gainsbourg "snubbed" Birkin and the making of the film suffered. Pierre Grimblat decides to change the course of things by inviting them to a dinner, to which he had planned not to come (by playing double or quits in a way). Without a witness at this meal, Gainsbourg and Birkin finally reconciled and began their relationship”.
