= Anno Birkin =

English poet and musician (1980–2001)

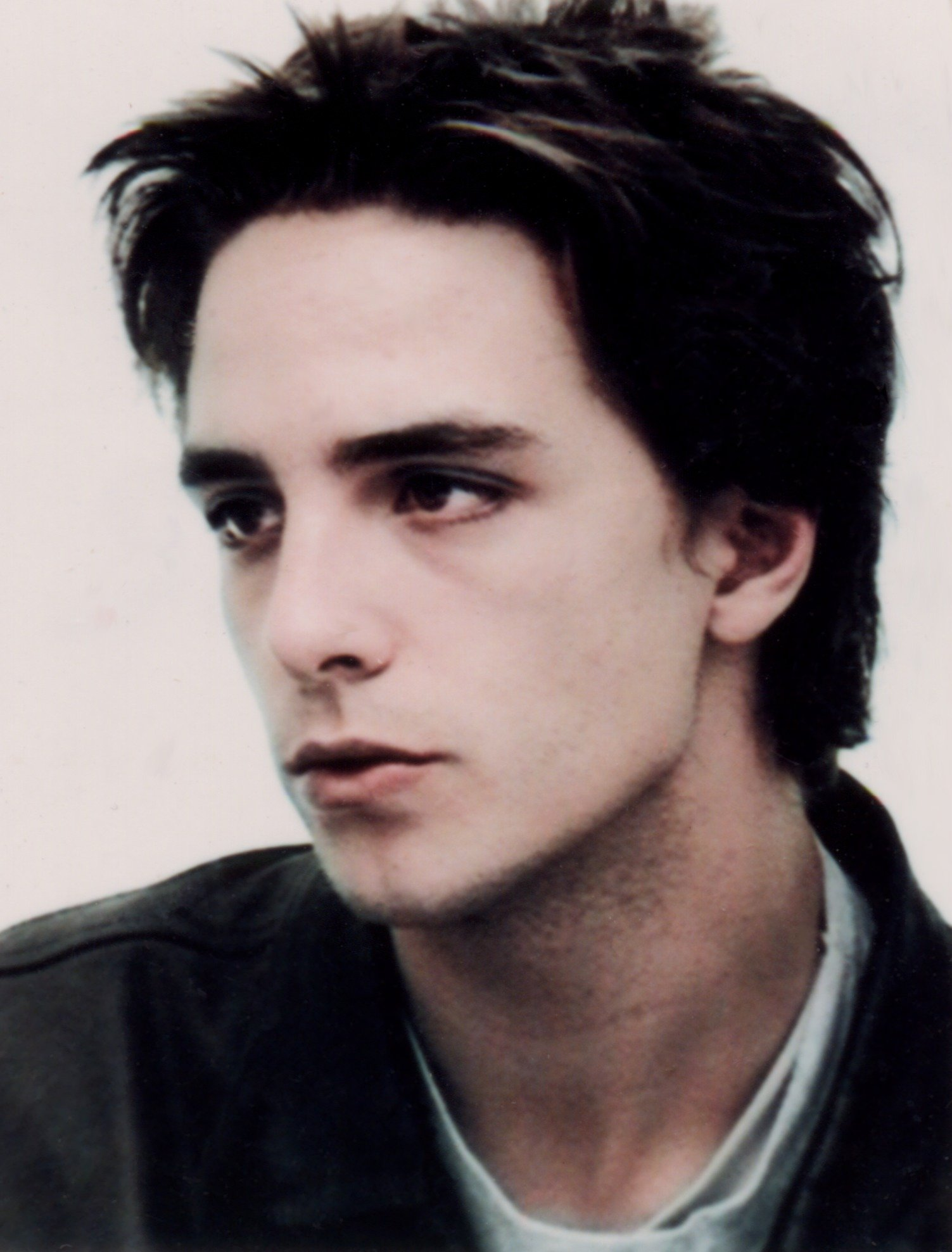
- Birkin in June 2001
- Born: Alexander Kingdom Nik-o Birkin; 9 December 1980; London, England
- Died: 8 November 2001 (aged 20); Milan, Italy
- Father: Andrew Birkin
- Relatives: David Birkin (half-brother); Judy Campbell (grandmother); Jane Birkin (aunt); Kate Barry (cousin); Charlotte Gainsbourg (cousin); Lou Doillon (cousin)

Alexander Kingdom Nik-o "Anno" Birkin (9 December 1980 – 8 November 2001) was an English poet and musician. He received critical acclaim before he and his bandmates Alberto Mangili and Lee Citron were killed in a car accident. The charity Anno's Africa was founded in his name.

== Relations ==
He was born to Andrew Birkin and Bee Gilbert. He had one brother Ned Birkin, three paternal half-siblings (one of whom is David Birkin) and two maternal half-siblings (Melissa Holm and Barnaby Holm). His paternal aunt was Jane Birkin, and his cousins are Kate Barry, Charlotte Gainsbourg and Lou Doillon. His grandparents on his father's side were Judy Campbell and Lt Cdr David Leslie Birkin, grandson of the lace manufacturer and railway director Sir Thomas Birkin, 1st Baronet.

== Childhood ==
Birkin named himself Anno when he was three, after his favourite book, Anno's Journey by Mitsumasa Anno. When he was five, his parents bought an old farmhouse on the Lleyn peninsula in Wales, and it was here that Birkin and his brother Ned spent most of their childhood, "living what friends describe as a Bohemian lifestyle where the house was forever full of friends".

== Music ==
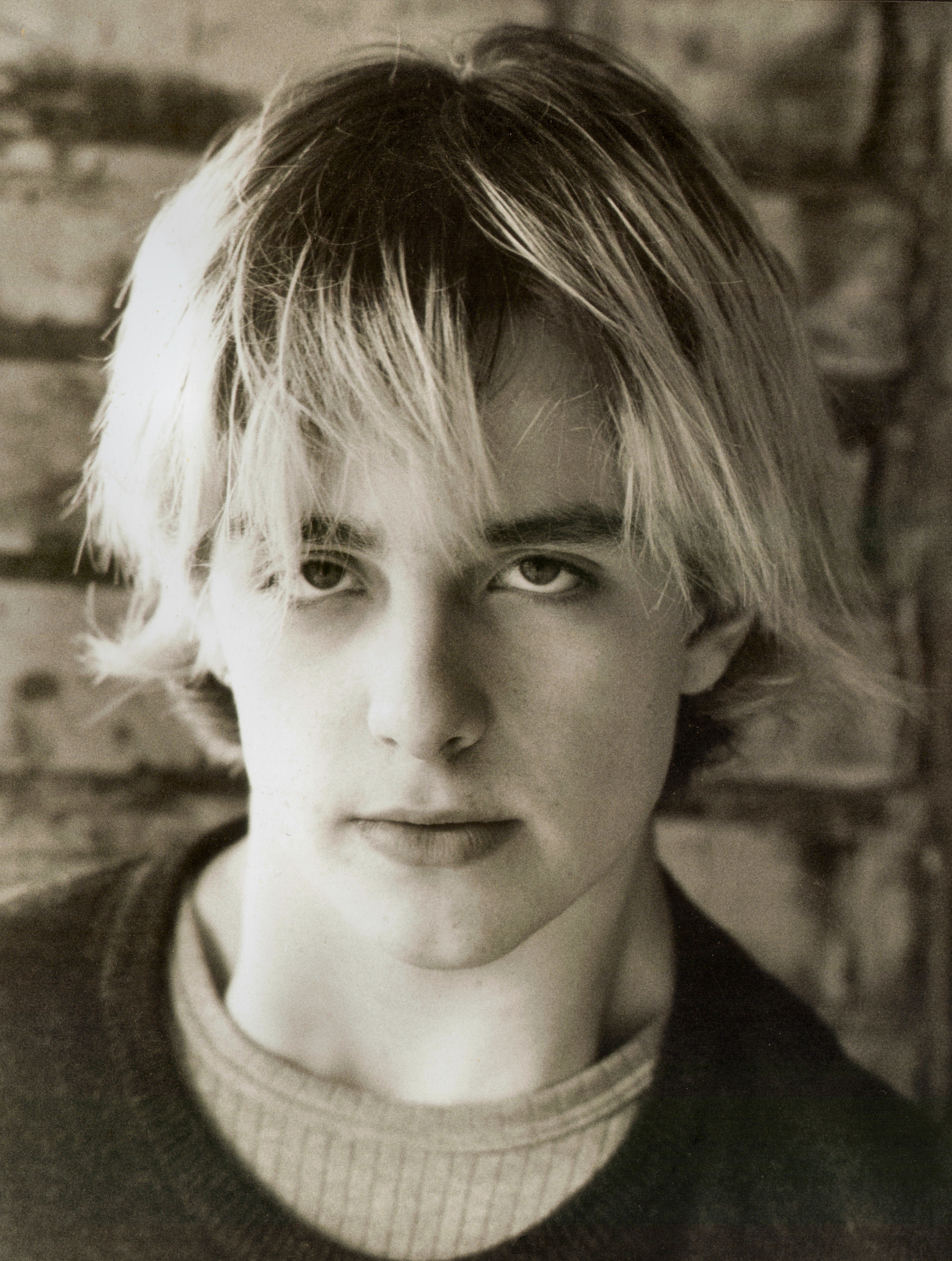
Birkin aged 17

Birkin's first band, called Midstream, formed in 1994 with his school-friends Billy Scherer and JS Rafaeli, gigged in London until 1996 when it split up. Durango 95 was put together that same year, but split up in 1997. For the next two years, Birkin composed and played on his own as well as working with Scherer.

While visiting his father on the film set of The Messenger: The Story of Joan of Arc in 1998, Birkin fell in love with the actress Milla Jovovich. Anno and Milla wrote and recorded several songs together.

During the summer of 1999, Birkin wrote and recorded a number of songs, both solo and with Scherer; the two wrote Ultraviolence together, and that led to a recording offer from Virgin. They turned it down and in August formed Flying Mango Attack with bassist Lee Citron and drummer Shïan Smith-Pancorvo (both formerly of Stony Sleep) and recorded the album Karmageddon. They briefly broke up after various drummers came and went, and once again Birkin and Scherer spent time recording together in Los Angeles.

In September 2000, Birkin, Scherer, and Citron met the Italian drummer Alberto Mangili and formed Kicks joy Darkness ("KjD", named after a quote from Jack Kerouac's On the Road). KjD began performing in late 2000 and in December recorded an EP Ark, produced in Birkin's Welsh studio. The following spring, he travelled around India with his brother David Birkin, writing poetry and songs. He returned to England in April and embarked on a series of gigs with KjD, quickly building up a keen following on the London circuit.

The band decided to record Method One, their first studio album, in Bergamo, where Mangili had a recording studio. They played their farewell gig at the Dublin Castle in London before heading to Italy at the end of August. Birkin wrote to his fiancée Honeysuckle Weeks: "Everything has fallen into place around my skull thanks to this opportunity [of recording in Italy]. For the first time in my life I feel like I know what I'm doing, and I'm doing what I know. The fear and anxiety and excitement I'm feeling at the moment is bursting me."

== Death ==
On 8 November 2001, after the band had spent the day rehearsing, they were driving early in the morning in a thick fog on a motorway outside of Milan. The driver swerved to avoid a stopped car, crashed into a truck parked on the shoulder, and Birkin, Citron and Mangili were killed instantly.

== Legacy ==
Birkin had created a website for the band in August 2001. Following his death, the site has provided a forum for his friends and fans. In 2003, Dreams of Waking – a 2-CD album of songs by Birkin and KjD – was released. Rock Sound called it an "art-rock adventure with hints of early Radiohead and Sonic Youth. … Anno's lyrics are poetic masterpieces in their own right." Later that year, a selection of Birkin's poetry – Who Said the Race Is Over? – was published and sold over 4,000 copies. Tom Payne reviewed it in The Daily Telegraph as "this proud, fresh Romanticism. … Yet for all their brilliance, the poems feel unfinished. It is not just that the words have been left behind as a kind of consolation to those who mourn the author; it is as though they are still going about their tasks, asking the same questions and insolently refusing to settle."

The poet Robert Anthony Welch (Dean of the Faculty of Arts at the University of Ulster) wrote, "Anno Birkin's book is utterly devastating. This is a great creative energy, with the authority and force of Rimbaud and the same quality of total honesty. And yet there is nothing mawkish about the whole thing, because the fire of relentless self-interrogation flames continually, purifying the emotion. So what you get is not something raw, but something highly tempered, like Toledo steel. Energetic, flashing, devastating."

Another Magazine published a selection of Birkin's poetry in 2005, commenting that "perhaps it is Withnail & I's writer and director Bruce Robinson who offers us the best description of the sheer assault of Birkin's talent. He writes in his introduction to the collection, 'Anno didn't need death to be brilliant. … I love his rage, and truth, and he touches me like I was still young. Anno too is a great poet, a teenage poet, and we can only be amazed by what he could do with half a yard of ink.'"

Birkin was one of the two subjects of a BBC Radio 4 documentary, The Lost Boys, broadcast in September 2006.

Rachel Davies of Esben and the Witch has cited Birkin's poetry as an influence on her own lyrics.

== Anno's Africa ==
With the profits of Birkin's words and music, his parents initiated Anno's Africa, an alternative arts-based charity for Kenyan orphans and slum children, with the aim of giving them a chance to express themselves creatively. His mother Bee Gilbert ran a pilot programme in the spring of 2007, to teach art, music, dance, drama, film, and acrobatics. The Telegraph Magazine published a five-page account of the pilot in September 2007, and an exhibition of the children's art work was held in London which featured over 200 paintings and monoprints. The event was hosted by Joanna Lumley and Ian Holm, and helped raise funds for the next project which was carried out in South Africa during March and April 2008. The Anno's Africa team returned to Kenya every year since then to carry out further arts workshops, which were the subject of a CNN special feature on 11 April 2011. Other trustees of the charity include actress Hayley Mills, artist Sarah Hamilton and screenwriter Emma Frost. A school sponsored by Anno's Africa was depicted in the second season of the Netflix TV series Sense8.
