= Judy Campbell =

English actress (1916–2004)

- Campbell in 1940
- Born: Judith Mary Gamble; 31 May 1916; Grantham, Lincolnshire, England
- Died: 6 June 2004 (aged 88); London, England
- Years active: 1935–2003
- Spouse: David Birkin (m. 1943; died 1991)
- Children: 3, including Andrew Birkin and Jane Birkin
- Relatives: David Birkin (grandson); Anno Birkin (grandson); Kate Barry (granddaughter); Charlotte Gainsbourg (granddaughter); Lou Doillon (granddaughter)

Judy Campbell (born Judith Mary Gamble; 31 May 1916 – 6 June 2004) was an English film, television and stage actress. Her daughter was the actress and singer Jane Birkin, her son the screenwriter and director Andrew Birkin, and among her grandchildren are the actresses Charlotte Gainsbourg and Lou Doillon, the late poet Anno Birkin, the artist David Birkin and the late photographer Kate Barry.

== Early life ==
Campbell was born in Grantham, Lincolnshire, on 31 May 1916, daughter of John Arthur Gamble and his wife Mary (née Fulton). She was educated briefly at Kesteven and Grantham Girls' School, then at St Michael's Convent, East Grinstead, Sussex. Both her parents were on the stage; her father was also the author of several plays under his professional name of J.A. Campbell.

In Grantham, her family was acquainted with the family of Margaret Roberts, later to become Margaret Thatcher, Conservative prime minister of the United Kingdom.

== Career ==
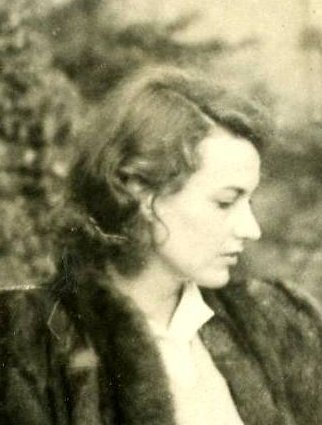
Judy Campbell (age 26), photographed by her husband Lt Cdr David Birkin at Dartmouth

Campbell made her stage debut in 1935 as a "Guest" in The Last of Mrs. Cheyney at the Theatre Royal, Grantham, and entered films in 1940 in the London-based thriller Saloon Bar.

In 1941, Campbell had a role in the stage musical Lady Behave. While touring with Coward from September 1942 to March 1943, she created the roles of Joanna in Present Laughter and Ethel in the stage production of This Happy Breed, and played Elvira in Blithe Spirit.

Campbell also appeared with him in twice-weekly troop concerts. In 1943 at the Theatre Royal, Haymarket, she performed in Present Laughter and This Happy Breed on alternate nights under the umbrella title of Play Parade, before playing Elvira in the West End presentation of Blithe Spirit at the Duchess Theatre in 1943. During one performance on tour, she was surprised to feel Coward stroking her shoulder in an affectionate way that was not called-for in the script, and she began to wonder "Have I succeeded where so many women have failed?" In fact, he was just trying to keep his hands warm in an unheated theatre during fuel rationing.

In 1981, Campbell appeared in Andrew Birkin's BAFTA-winning and Academy Award-nominated short film Sredni Vashtar (1981), playing the fearsome Aunt Augusta. It was her last major film role, although she appeared regularly on British television throughout the remainder of her career.

In 1995, she appeared as Laura’s mother Caroline’s grandmother in ITV’s The Upper Hand.

In 2002, Campbell lent her patrician presence to a television remake of The Forsyte Saga.

In December 2002, at the end of a 67-year career as a boulevard actress and chanteuse, Campbell gave her farewell London performances at the King's Head Theatre with Where Are the Songs We Sung?, a nostalgic garland of songs, memories, and scenes from plays, accompanied by Stefan Bednarczyk at the piano, a programme they finally reprised at the Jermyn Street Theatre. The evening recalled her Grantham childhood, the 1950s with Sandy Wilson, by way of the Liverpool rep with Robert Helpmann, wintry tours and troop concerts with Noël Coward and cheering up West End audiences during the Blitz on London, including her unique renderings of "A Nightingale Sang in Berkeley Square", the Eric Maschwitz standard that made her a star in the New Faces revue at the Comedy Theatre in 1940.

In September 2003, Campbell finally recorded "Nightingale" (and Coward's "If Love Were All"), as part of a cabaret performance with Sheridan Morley and Michael Law at Pizza on the Park. She had previously appeared as guest star with Morley and Law for several Jermyn Street cabaret performances as well as with Law's Piccadilly Dance Orchestra, most memorably for a Coward centenary concert at the Queen Elizabeth Hall in 1999, where she had regaled the audience with anecdotes about her work with Coward during the 1940s (and sang "her" Nightingale song).

== Personal life and death ==
She was married to Lieutenant-Commander David Birkin, DSC RNVR, until his death in 1991. The couple had three children.

They bought the oldest house in Old Church Street, Chelsea, which was once a pub, "a few steps from the Chelsea Arts Club", in 1974, and Campbell lived there until her death in 2004.

Campbell died in London on 6 June 2004, aged 88. After her death, her name was commemorated on the actresses' dressing-room door at the Jermyn Street Theatre.

In March 2023, she was one of a number of notable women with a connection to Grantham honoured by South Kesteven District Council.

== Theatre ==
- 'Guest' in The Last of Mrs. Cheyney, Theatre Royal, Grantham (Easter 1935) followed by a season of repertory
- Season of repertory, Opera House, Coventry (May 1935), followed by a further season at Theatre Royal, Brighton (1936)
- London debut as Anna in Anthony and Anna, People's Palace (April 1937)
- Natasha Malakoff in Bulldog Drummond Hits Out, People's Palace (July 1937) and Savoy Theatre (December 1937)
- Shakespeare and Shaw season, Festival Theatre, Cambridge (1938)
- Irene in Idiot's Delight, touring with Vic Oliver (July–December 1938)
- Leading roles with Liverpool Playhouse Company (1939–40)
- New Faces Revue, Comedy Theatre (April 1940, and again March 1941), "making a hit with the song A Nightingale Sang in Berkeley Square."
- Lola Malo in Lady Behave, His Majesty's Theatre (July 1941)
- Phyllis Tree in Ducks and Drakes, Apollo Theatre (November 1941)
- Marthe de Brancovis in The Watch on the Rhine Aldwych Theatre (April 1942)
- Touring with Noêl Coward (September 1942 – March 1943), creating the roles of Joanna in Present Laughter and Ethel in This Happy Breed, also playing Elvira in Blithe Spirit, "as well as appearing with Noël in twice-weekly troop concerts".
- Play Parade: alternate nights in Present Laughter and This Happy Breed, Theatre Royal Haymarket (April 1943)
- Elvira in Blithe Spirit, Duchess Theatre (July 1943)
- Mirandolina in The Mistress of the Inn, Arts Theatre (August 1944)
- Diana Flynn in Another Love Story, Phoenix Theatre, (December 1944)
- Lydia in Call Home the Heart, touring (1946)
- Joanna in Portrait of Hickory, Embassy Theatre (April 1948)
- Martha Shale in This Is Where We Came In, touring (1948)
- Princess Louise in Royal Highness, Lyric, Hammersmith (April 1949)
- Miranda Frayle in Relative Values, Savoy Theatre (November 1951)
- Joanna in Book of the Month, Cambridge Theatre, (April 1956)
- Sheila Broadbent in The Reluctant Debutante, Cambridge Theatre (April 1956)
- Helen in A Sparrow Falls in the double-bill Double Yoke, St Martin's Theatre (February 1960)
- Hermione Hushabye in Heartbreak House, Oxford Playhouse (October 1961) and Wyndham's Theatre (November 1961)
- Lorette Heller in Domino, touring (February 1963)
- Lady Slingsby-Craddock in Alan Ayckbourn's Mr Whatnot, New Arts (August 1964)
- Mrs Clandon in You Never Can Tell, Theatre Royal Haymarket (January 1966)
- Christine Mannon in Mourning Becomes Electra, Arts (June 1967), Balbek and Edinburgh Festival (1968)
- Sheila in Relatively Speaking, Duke of York's Theatre (September 1967)
- Judith Bliss in Hay Fever, Cambridge Theatre Company, touring (May 1971)
- Death on Demand, touring (Autumn 1972)
- Lady Touchwood in The Double Dealer, Bristol Old Vic, Hong Kong Arts Festival (February 1973)
- Jennifer in My Son's Father, touring (May 1974)
- Linda Loman in Death of a Salesman, Oxford Playhouse (October 1975)
- Beth in Le Weekend, Bristol Old Vic (May 1976)
- Bron in The Old Country, Theatre Royal Windsor (March 1978)
- Mrs Higgins in Pygmalion, Young Vic, (January 1981)
- Duchess of York in Richard II, Young Vic (February 1981)
- Grand Duchess Charles in The Sleeping Prince, Chichester (August 1983) and Theatre Royal Haymarket (November 1983)
- Lady Bracknell in The Importance (Wilde musical adaptation), Ambassadors Theatre (May 1984)
- Madame Vaneska in Noël Coward's Star Quality, Richmond Theatre Gala (March 1989)
- Lucy Willow in Bless the Bride, King's Head Theatre (June 1999)
- The Jermyn Street Revue, Jermyn Street Theatre (May 2000)
- Marcel's Grandmother in Remembrance of Things Past, National, Cottesloe (November 2000)
- Where Are The Songs We Sung?, King's Head Theatre (December 2002) and Jermyn Street Theatre (2003)

Plays by Judy Campbell:

- Sing Cuckoo, Whitehall Theatre (10 December 1950)
- The Bright One, Winter Garden Theatre (10 December 1958)

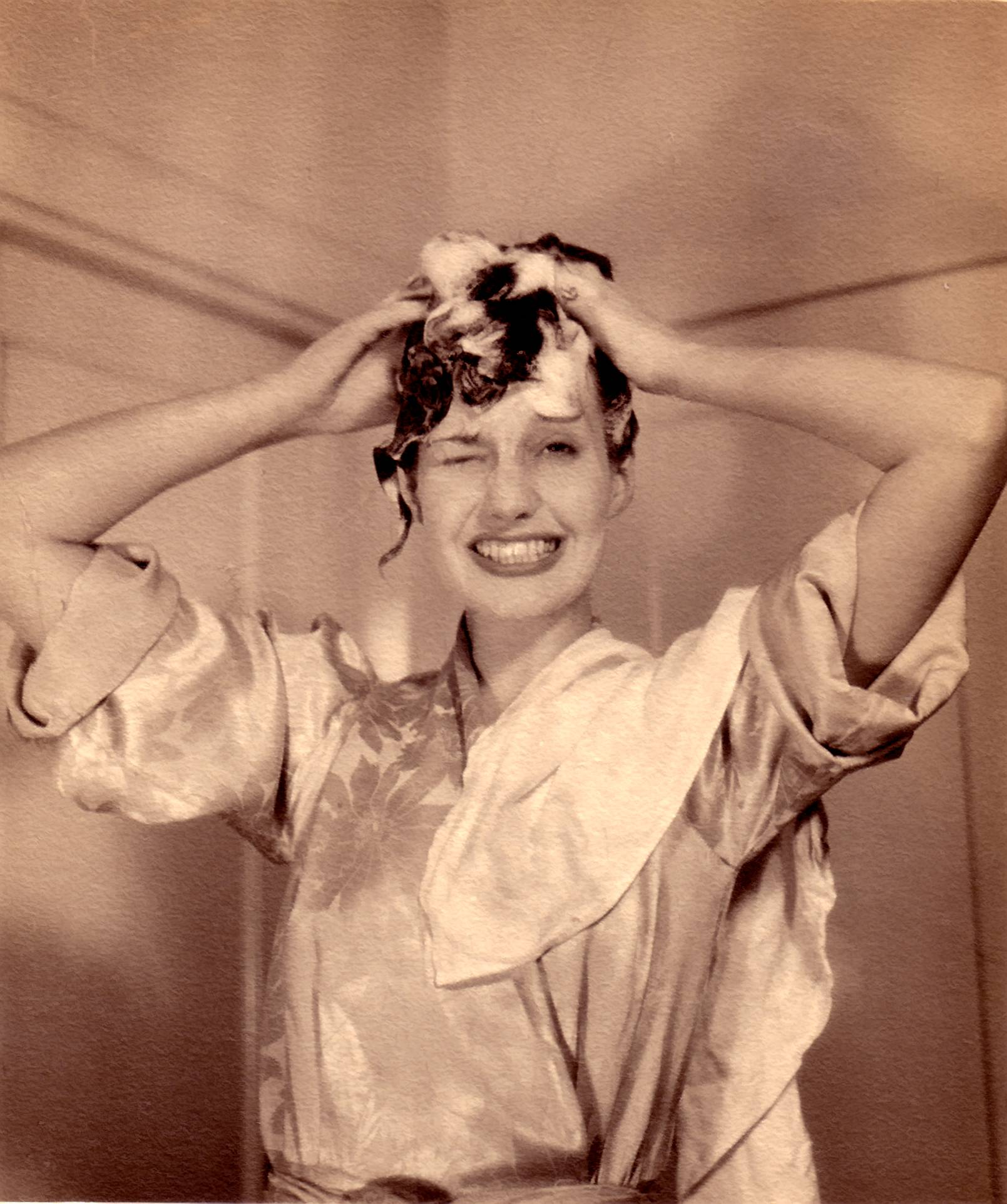
Campbell in 1945

== Selected filmography ==
=== Films ===
- Convoy (1940) – Lucy Armitage
- Saloon Bar (1940) – Doris
- East of Piccadilly (1941) – Penny Sutton
- Breach of Promise (1942) – Pamela Lawrence
- The World Owes Me a Living (1945) – Moira Barrett
- Green for Danger (1947) – Sister Bates
- Bonnie Prince Charlie (1948) – Clementina Walkinshaw
- There's a Girl in My Soup (1970) – Lady Heather
- Mr. Forbush and the Penguins (1971) – Mrs. Forbush
- Sredni Vashtar (1981) – Aunt Augusta
- Kung-Fu Master (1988) – La mère
- Future Force (1989) – COPS officer

=== Television and TV films ===
- The Tamer Tamed (1956) – Katharina
- Amphitryon 38
- Don't Listen Ladies (1963)
- Anna Karenina (1985) – Countess Vronsky
- Inspector Morse (1987) – Mrs. Rawlinson
- The Cater Street Hangman (1998) – Grandmama
- The Forsyte Saga (Granada, 2002) – Aunt Ann

== Sources ==
- "Obituary: Judy Campbell". The Daily Telegraph. 9 June 2004.
- Judy Campbell's CV in Who's Who in the Theatre, 17th Edition (Vol 1), editor Ian Herbert, Gale Research (1981); ISBN 0-8103-0235-7
- Noël Coward's second volume of autobiography, Future Indefinite, William Heinemann (1954)
- John Thaxter's review of Where Are The Songs We Sung?, What's on in London, published 18 December 2002 (this and other reviews archived in Theatre Record 2002)
