= Di doo dah =

Studio album by Jane Birkin
- Released: 1973
- Studio: Phonogram (London, UK); Studio des Dames, Paris (vocals)
- Genre: Chanson, soft rock, symphonic rock, symphonic pop
- Length: 30:29
- Label: Fontana
- Producer: Alain Hortu

Jane Birkin chronology
Jane Birkin/Serge Gainsbourg (1969)	Di doo dah (1973)	Lolita Go Home (1975)

Di doo dah is the debut solo album by Jane Birkin, released in 1973 on Fontana Records. Subsequent reissues in 2001 and 2010 (on Light In The Attic Records) included two bonus tracks from the 1972 7" single "La Décadanse" by Birkin and Serge Gainsbourg.

== Track listing ==
Words and music by Serge Gainsbourg, except "Encore lui", "Leur plaisir sans moi", "La cible qui bouge" and "C'est la vie qui veut ça" by Serge Gainsbourg and Jean-Claude Vannier

1. "Di doo dah" (3:35)
2. "Help camionneur!" (2:48)
3. "Encore lui" (2:26)
4. "Puisque je te le dis" (2:35)
5. "Les Capotes anglaises" (2:13)
6. "Leur plaisir sans moi" (1:43)
7. "Mon amour baiser" (2:33)
8. "Banana Boat" (2:19)
9. "Kawasaki" (2:34)
10. "La Cible qui bouge" (3:10)
11. "La Baigneuse de Brighton" (2:16)
12. "C'est la vie qui veut ça" (2:17)
13. "La Décadanse" (5:20) (bonus track)
14. "Les Langues de chat" (2:17) (bonus track)

"Help camionneur!" uses the same melody as "My Green Heart" (Les Cœurs Verts O.S.T., 1966) and "Le canari est sur le balcon" (Je T'aime Moi Non Plus, 1969)

== Personnel ==
- Peter Olliff - music engineer
- Jean-Claude Charvier - arrangements, conductor, vocals engineer
- Sam Lévin - front cover photography
- Tony Frank - photography
