= Richard Birkin =

British lace manufacturer (1805–1870)

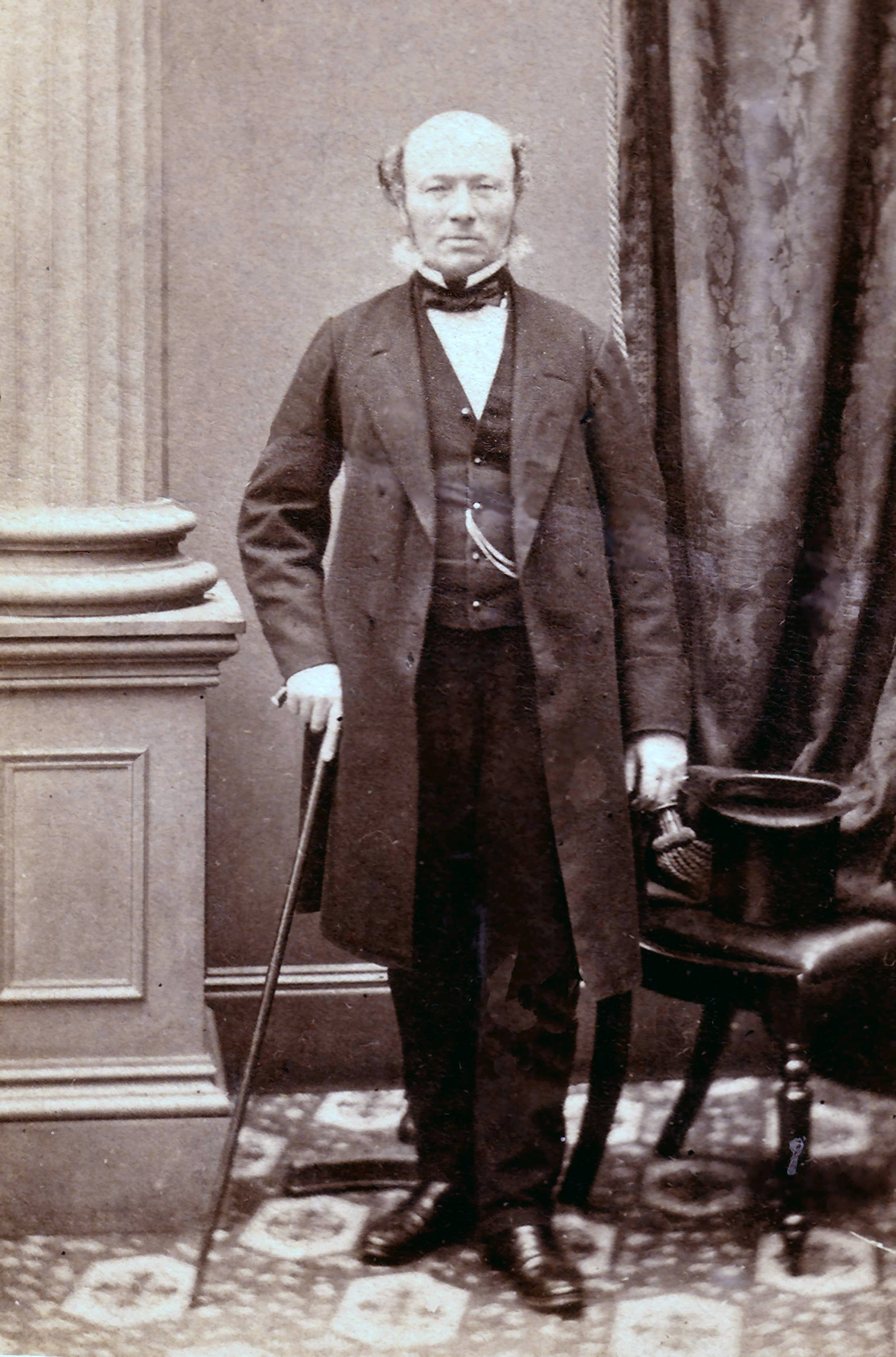
- Richard Birkin, taken from a daguerreotype, c. 1845
- Born: 6 July 1805; Belper, Derbyshire, England
- Died: 10 October 1870 (aged 65); Nottingham, England
- Occupation: Lace manufacturer
- Title: Lord Mayor of Nottingham
- Term: 1849/50, 1855/56, and 1861/63
- Board member of: Midland Railway Company
- Children: 2, including Thomas

Richard Birkin (6 July 1805 – 10 October 1870) was a British lace manufacturer.

== Early life ==
Richard Birkin was born in Belper, Derbyshire, on 6 July 1805, the eldest son of Richard Birkin, a calico handloom weaver, and started working in Strutt's Mill aged 7.

== Career ==
In 1824, Birkin formed a partnership with Thomas Biddle in Hyson Green, having worked for him for two years. By 1832, they had 50 employees, including Birkin's parents and two sisters.

In 1850, his sons Richard and Thomas joined the partnership.

In 1855, he had built the four-storey Birkin Building, a grade II listed warehouse in Nottingham's Broadway, by Garland & Holland, with Thomas Chambers Hine as the architect.

He retired in 1856.

== Personal life ==
Birkin was married and had two sons, Richard and Thomas.

He was a magistrate, and a director of the Midland Railway Company. He was Lord Mayor of Nottingham in 1849/50, 1855/56 and 1861/63. He bought Aspley Hall, Nottingham, for £60,000.

He died on 10 October 1870, at Aspley Hall.
