= Sredni Vashtar (film) =

Sredni Vashtar is a 1981 short film directed, written, and produced by Andrew Birkin. It is based on the short story of the same name written by Saki. It won the BAFTA award for Best Short Film, and was nominated for an Academy Award for Best Live Action Short Film.

== Cast ==
- Sacha Puttnam - Conradin (as Alexander Puttnam)
- Judy Campbell - Aunt Augusta
- Lila Kaye - Mrs. Woolridge
- Patty Hannock - Effie
- Gorden Kaye - Ogden
- Vernon Dobtcheff - Dr. Russell
- Allan Corduner - Mortimer
- Shona Morris - Vera
