= Jane Birkin =

British actress and singer (1946–2023)

Jane Birkin OBE
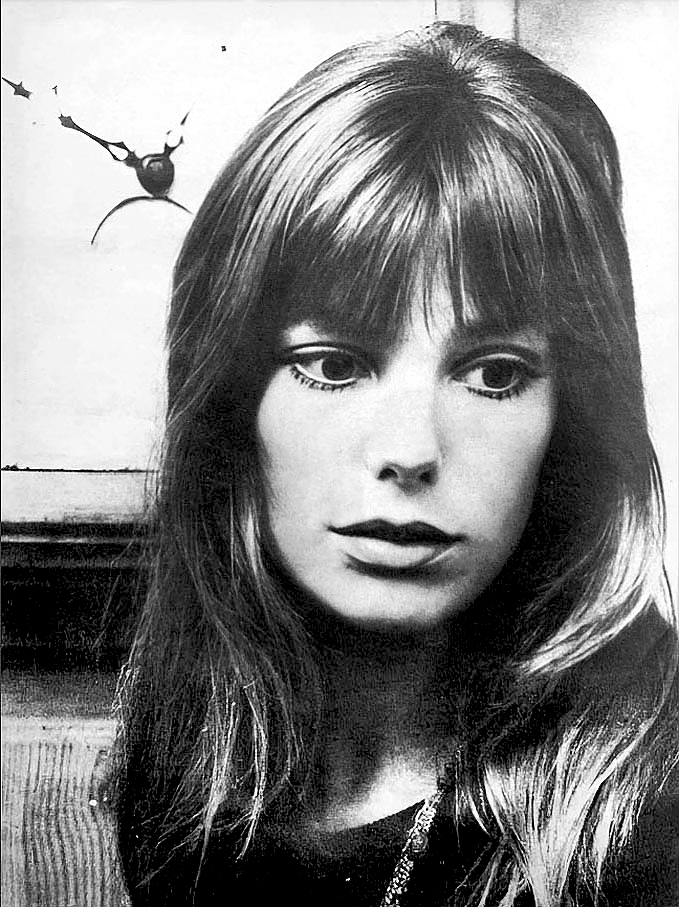
- Birkin in 1970
- Born: Jane Mallory Birkin; 14 December 1946; Marylebone, London, England
- Died: 16 July 2023 (aged 76); Paris, France
- Resting place: Montparnasse Cemetery, Paris
- Citizenship: United Kingdom; France
- Education: Upper Chine School, Isle of Wight
- Occupations: Singer; actress
- Years active: 1965–2023
- Spouse: John Barry (m. 1965; div. 1969)
- Partners: Serge Gainsbourg (1968–1980); Jacques Doillon (1980–1993)
- Children: Kate Barry; Charlotte Gainsbourg; Lou Doillon
- Mother: Judy Campbell
- Relatives: Andrew Birkin (brother); David Birkin (nephew); Anno Birkin (nephew)

Jane Mallory Birkin (/ˈbɜːrkɪn/ BUR-kin; 14 December 1946 – 16 July 2023) was an Anglo-French actress and singer. She had a prolific career as an actress, mostly in French cinema.

A native of London, Birkin began her career as an actress, appearing in minor roles in Michelangelo Antonioni's Blowup (1966) and Kaleidoscope (1966). In 1968 she met Serge Gainsbourg while co-starring with him in Slogan, which marked the beginning of a years-long working and personal relationship. The duo released a debut album, Jane Birkin/Serge Gainsbourg, in 1969, and Birkin appeared in the film Je t'aime moi non plus in 1976 under Gainsbourg's direction. She mostly worked in France, where she had become a major star, and occasionally appeared in English-language films such as the Agatha Christie adaptations Death on the Nile (1978) and Evil Under the Sun (1982), as well as James Ivory's A Soldier's Daughter Never Cries (1998).

Birkin lived mainly in France from the late 1960s onward, acquiring French citizenship. She was the mother of photographer Kate Barry with her first husband John Barry; of actress and singer Charlotte Gainsbourg with Serge Gainsbourg; and of musician Lou Doillon with Jacques Doillon. She lent her name to the Hermès Birkin handbag. After separating from Gainsbourg in 1980, Birkin continued to work both as an actress and a singer, appearing in various independent films and recording numerous solo albums. In 2016, she starred in the Academy Award-nominated short film La femme et le TGV, which she said would be her final film role.

== Early life ==
Jane Mallory Birkin was born on 14 December 1946, in Marylebone, London. Her father, Lt. Cdr. David Leslie Birkin (1914–1991), grandson of Sir Thomas Birkin, 1st Baronet and a member of the wealthy Birkin family, was a Royal Navy lieutenant commander and World War II spy who had worked with the French Resistance. His first cousin was Freda Dudley Ward, a mistress of Edward VIII while he was Prince of Wales. Through her father, Birkin was a first-cousin-once-removed of film director Carol Reed, to whom Birkin turned for advice about becoming an actress when she was a teenager, and a second cousin of Reed's nephew, actor Oliver Reed. Reed told her it all depended on if the camera loved her. Her mother, Judy Campbell, was an actress best known for her work on stage, whose family was acquainted with the family of Margaret Thatcher while living in Grantham. She was Noël Coward's muse and "A Nightingale Sang in Berkeley Square" was written for her. Birkin's elder brother is screenwriter and director Andrew Birkin.

Birkin was raised in Chelsea and described herself as a "shy English girl". She said that she was bullied for her looks; "I suffered a lot because of my physique, especially at boarding school. The others said I was half boy, half girl. I had no breasts, not even a developing bosom. It was horrible." She said she wanted to be as pretty as Jean Shrimpton, calling herself a "bad version" of her. Her middle name, "Mallory", was invented by her mother; it was partly inspired by the name of Arthurian author Sir Thomas Malory.

Birkin attended Miss Ironside's School in Kensington and Upper Chine School on the Isle of Wight. In 2021, she said she had started taking sleeping pills at 16 and never stopped. At the age of 17 she met composer John Barry, whom she married in 1965 and with whom she had her first daughter, Kate, in 1967. After Barry left for the United States, the couple divorced in 1968 and Birkin returned to live with her family in London. She began auditioning for film and television roles in Britain and in Los Angeles.

== Career ==
=== Early acting credits ===
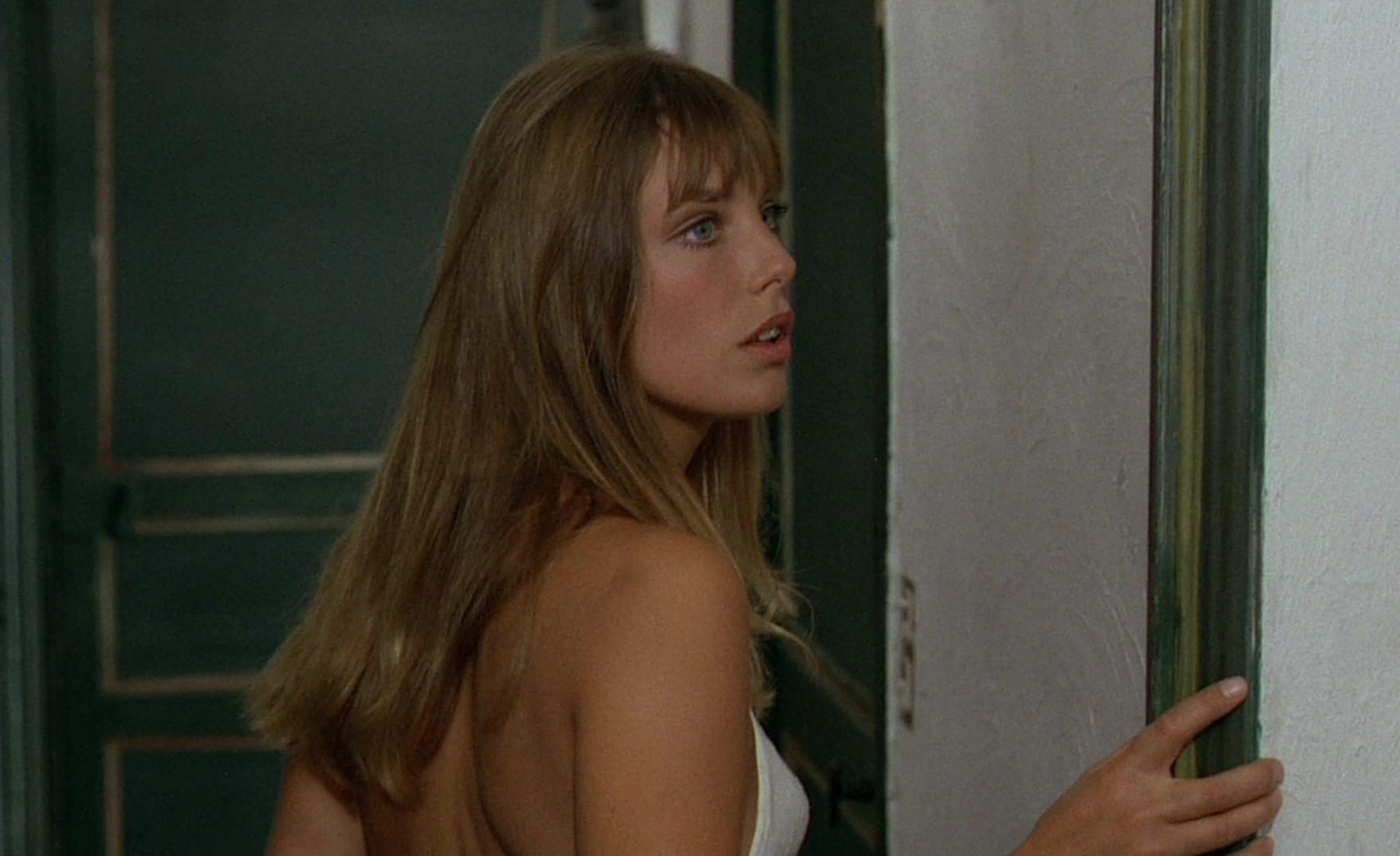
Birkin in La Piscine, 1969

Birkin emerged in the Swinging London scene of the 1960s, appearing in an uncredited part in The Knack ...and How to Get It (1965). In 1965 she also appeared in a musical, Passion Flower Hotel, for which John Barry wrote the music. Barry, aged 30, proposed to 17-year old Birkin but her father forbade it as she was still a minor. They married when she was 18.

In 1965 she had her first film role in Richard Lester's The Knack. She had a small role in Michelangelo Antonioni's Blowup (1966) with Vanessa Redgrave and Sarah Miles. The movie gained notoriety because of Birkin's nude scene, which she later said she did because Barry had told her she would not have the courage to show up naked on set. Birkin also said that on the day of her audition, she had no idea who Antonioni was. She had a more substantial role in the counterculture era film Kaleidoscope (1966) and a starring role as a fantasy-like model in Joe Massot's cult psychedelic swinging London film Wonderwall (1968).

Birkin met Serge Gainsbourg when she auditioned for the lead female role in the French film Slogan in which he was starring (1969). Although she did not speak French she won the role, co-starring alongside Gainsbourg, and she performed with him on the film's theme song, "La Chanson de Slogan", the first of many collaborations between the two. After filming Slogan, Birkin relocated to France permanently. She had a role in the French thriller La Piscine (1969) and said that the movie had enabled her to stay in France: "The film saved me and enabled me to stay in France. I just finished Slogan and was due to go back to England." Though her heavy English accent did prevent her from getting some roles, it turned out to be an asset in her career, as French audiences found it charming when she spoke French. She later stated: "Without my accent, I would have had a different career."

=== Collaborations with Serge Gainsbourg and other work ===
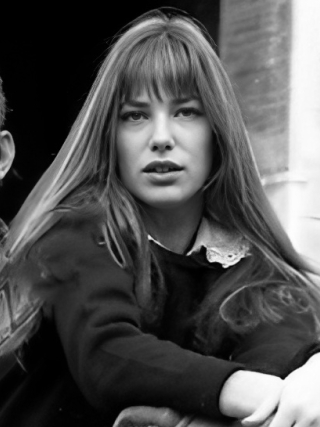
Birkin in 1976

Birkin and Barry divorced in 1969 and Birkin moved in with Gainsbourg in the Rue de Verneuil in Paris. Their relationship was volatile; on one occasion after a quarrel she threw herself into the Seine. In 1969 she appeared with Gainsbourg in two films, Les Chemins de Katmandou and Cannabis, and by herself in Jacques Deray's psychological thriller La Piscine, which starred Romy Schneider and Alain Delon. Birkin sang backing vocals on two tracks of Gainsbourg's album l'Histoire de Melody Nelson and her portrait appeared on the album cover.

In 1969, Gainsbourg and Birkin released the duet "Je t'aime... moi non plus" ("I love you ... me neither"). Gainsbourg had originally written the song for Brigitte Bardot and Birkin said it was "jealousy" that drove her to sing it. Shortly after making the recording, Birkin and Gainsbourg went for dinner at the Hotel des Beaux Arts in Paris and without saying anything, Gainsbourg put the record on the record player. Birkin recalled that all of a sudden, all the couples around them stopped talking with their knives and forks frozen in mid-air. Gainsbourg said, "I think we've got a hit record". The song caused a scandal for its sexual explicitness and was banned by radio stations in Italy, Spain and the United Kingdom. In Italy, the head of their record label was jailed for offending public morality.

[It is] very flattering to have the most beautiful songs, probably, in the French language written for [you]. [But] how much talent did I really have? Perhaps not that much.

— Birkin reflecting on her working relationship with Gainsbourg, 2013

"Je t'aime" made UK chart history when on 4 October 1969 and the following week on 11 October, the song was at two different chart positions, despite being the same song, the same artists, and the same recorded version, the only difference being that they were on different record labels. It was originally released on the Fontana label, but because of the controversy, Fontana withdrew the record, which was then released on the Major Minor label. Fontana singles were still in the shops, along with the Major Minor release, and on 4 October 1969 the Major Minor release was at number three and the Fontana single at number 16. At that time it was the biggest-selling single ever for a completely foreign-language record.

Birkin appeared on Gainsbourg's 1971 album Histoire de Melody Nelson, portraying the Lolita-like protagonist in song and on the cover. Reflecting on being a muse and collaborator of Gainsbourg's, Birkin commented: "[It is] very flattering to have the most beautiful songs, probably, in the French language written for one. [But] how much talent did I really have? Perhaps not that much." During the 1970s she released three albums, all mainly written by Gainsbourg: Di doo dah (1973), Lolita Go Home (1975) and Ex fan des sixties (1978).

She took a break from acting in 1971–1972 after her daughter Charlotte was born, and returned in 1973 as Brigitte Bardot's lover in Roger Vadim's Don Juan, or If Don Juan Were a Woman. She called Bardot "fabulously beautiful", saying: "I observed Bardot in the tiniest detail to find a flaw in her. Her mouth, her nose, her skin, her hair... She was fabulously beautiful." The same year, she had a supporting role in the horror film Dark Places with Christopher Lee and Joan Collins. She made five films in 1975, including Claude Zidi's box-office hit The Wild Goose Chase (La course à l'échalote) and Gainsbourg's first film as a director, Je t'aime moi non plus, which created a stir for its frank examination of sexual ambiguity, and was banned in the United Kingdom by the British Board of Film Classification. For this performance, she was nominated for a Best Actress César Award. Further albums followed, including the well-received Ex-fan des sixties, and more films, among them John Guillermin's Death on the Nile, in which she appeared opposite Peter Ustinov, Bette Davis, Mia Farrow and Maggie Smith. In 1978, Birkin modeled in trade advertisements for Lee Cooper jeans.

By 1980, Birkin was becoming disillusioned with the "hard-drinking, domineering" Gainsbourg. She left him and bought a house in the 16th arrondissement Paris, where she lived for the next 15 years. They remained on good terms and shared custody of their daughter. Birkin began a relationship with film-maker Jacques Doillon after they met on the set of his film La fille prodigue and a daughter, Lou, was born in 1982. She later appeared in his film La Pirate and Jacques Rivette's L'Amour par Terre.

=== Later performances and recordings ===
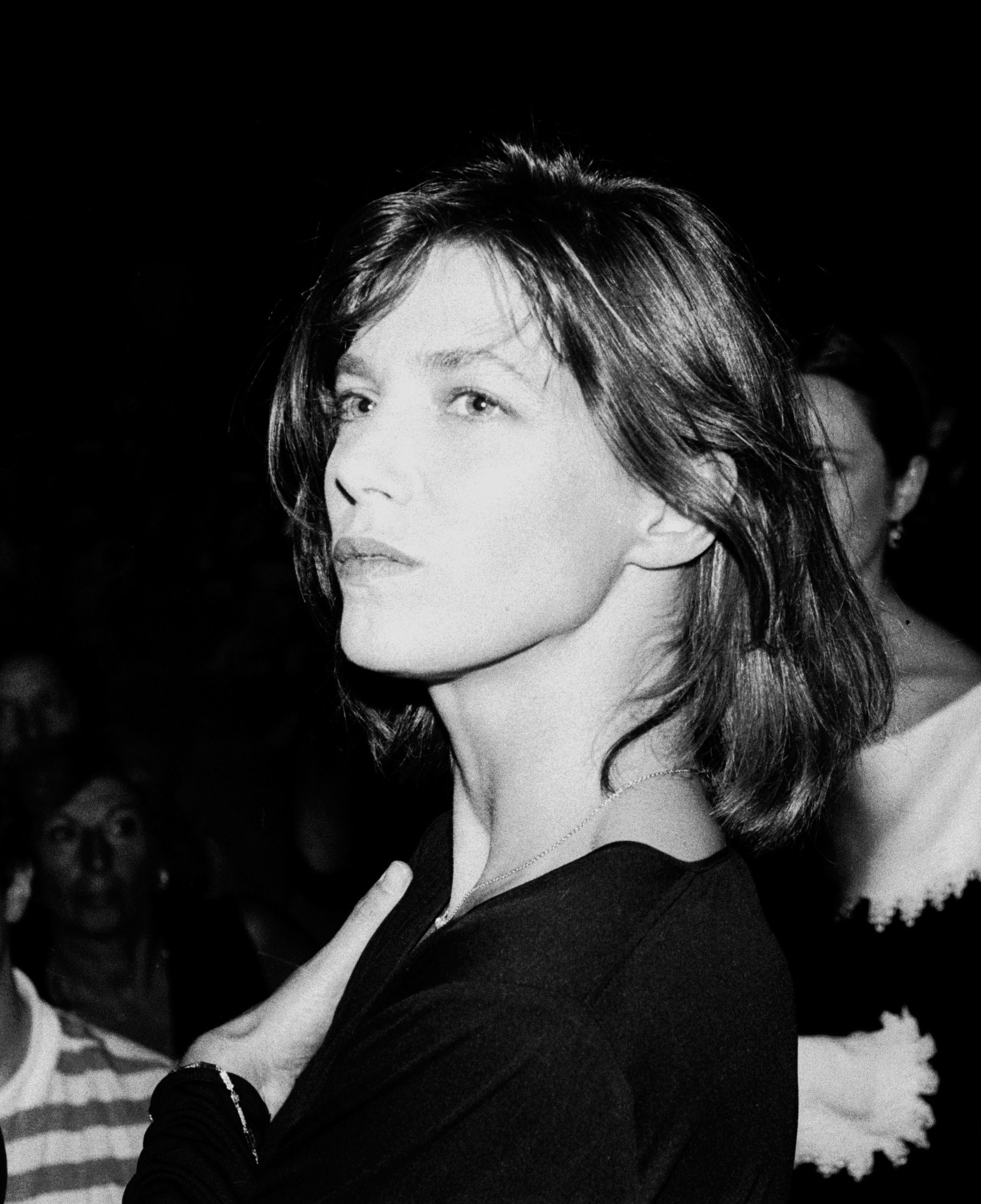
Birkin in 1985

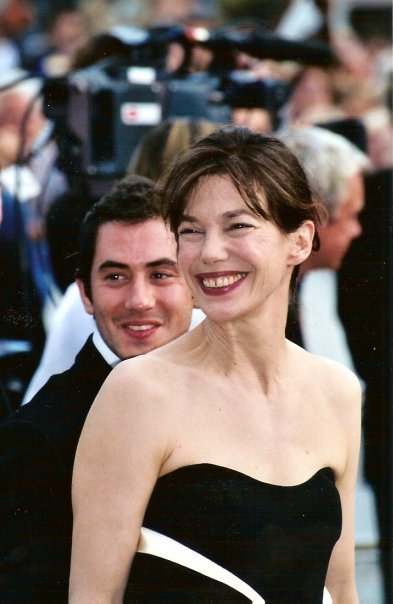
Birkin at the 2001 Cannes Film Festival

Birkin renewed her professional partnership with Gainsbourg, who had continued to write music for her after their breakup and recorded several albums with him, from Baby Alone in Babylone (1983), their first collaboration after their separation in 1980, to Amours des feintes (1990), the last he wrote before his death from a heart attack in March 1991. Birkin said in 2011 that Gainsbourg had been someone who "drank a vast amount. It started out being funny and then it got monotonous, (but) our friendship went on until his dying day."

Of Baby Alone in Babylone Birkin has said: "This was the album of the break-up when everything changed. All of a sudden, Serge got me to sing of his wounds and his feminine side. It was very unsettling to sing about the wounds that you have triggered." While recording the album, she sang as high as she could and said she had become "tired of singing as the little girl who excites gentlemen in trains". She also chose "Les Dessous chics" as "a portrait of Serge." She said: "It represents the modesty of feelings, made up outrageously in blood red. Les Dessous chics means keeping one's true feelings deep inside, as fragile as a silk stocking." Lost Song (1987) was also written by Gainsbourg.

Birkin starred in two films directed by Jacques Doillon: as Anne in La fille prodigue (The Prodigal Daughter, 1981) and as Alma in La pirate (1984, nominated for a César Award). She said The Prodigal Daughter (1981) was the first time her performance had been well received and "It touched [her] deeply to be taken seriously". Before working with Doillon she did not know about his work and said: "No one had ever offered me a part like that or asked me to have a nervous breakdown". She cited this film as her favorite, saying: "Piccoli and I were really good. If I die, I would like the film to be shown on television, even at midnight." When it was screened at Cannes it caused a scandal, which led to an invitation for Birkin from Patrice Chéreau to star on stage in La Fausse suivante by Marivaux at Nanterre. Recalling her experience on the stage, she said: "That was my first stage experience, which finally gave me the courage to sing at the Bataclan."

She worked with director Herbert Vesely on Egon Schiele Exzess und Bestrafung in 1980, appearing as the mistress of Austrian artist Egon Schiele, played by Mathieu Carrière. She appeared in the Agatha Christie films Death on the Nile (1978) and Evil Under the Sun (1982). Jacques Rivette collaborated with her in Love on the Ground (1983) and La Belle Noiseuse (1991, nominated Césars best supporting actress). In 1985, she co-starred with John Gielgud in Leave All Fair (1985). She won Female Artist of the Year in the 1992 Victoires de la Musique.

In 1995 Birkin played one of the lead roles in the Euripides tragedy The Trojan Women at the National Theatre in London. She appeared in Merchant Ivory's A Soldier's Daughter Never Cries (1998) (which also used her song "Di Doo Dah") and in Merci Docteur Rey (2002). The end title song for Le Divorce (2003) featured her singing "L'Anamour", composed by Gainsbourg. In 2006, she played the title role in Elektra, directed by Philippe Calvario in France.

Birkin recorded the song "Beauty" on French producer Hector Zazou's album Strong Currents (2003). The album brought together a number of well-known soloists and featured her alongside Laurie Anderson, Irene Grandi and Melanie Gabriel, among others. On this album Birkin and Melanie Gabriel covered songs by Nina Hynes. Birkin undertook world tours in which she performed Gainsbourg's songs and recorded more albums, including Lolita Go Home, Rendez-vous (2004), an album of duets with, among others, Francoise Hardy and Bryan Ferry, Fictions (2006) and Enfants d'hiver (2008).

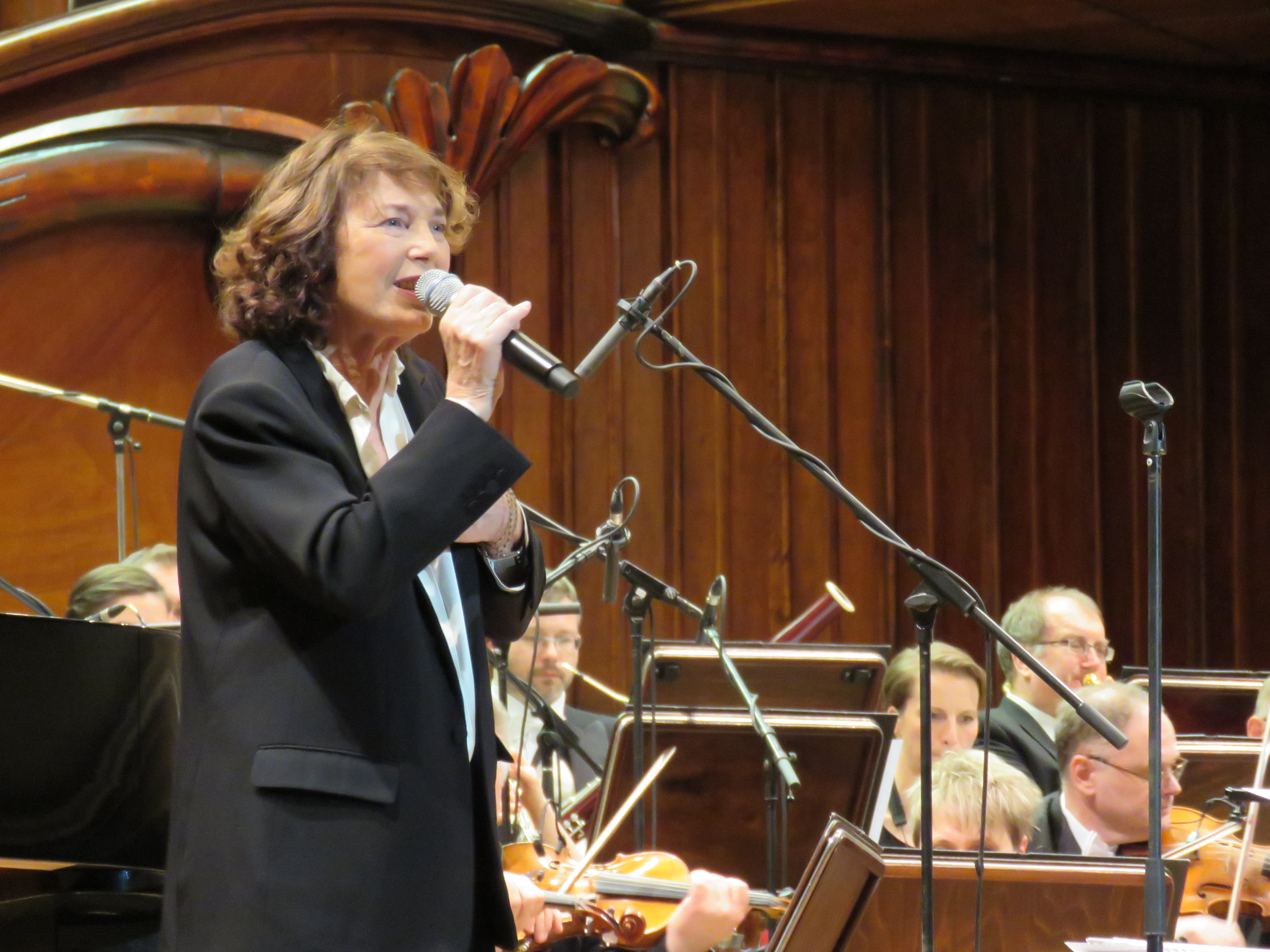
Birkin performing in Warsaw in 2017

The cover art of Have You Fed the Fish? (2002) by singer-songwriter Badly Drawn Boy featured her image. The album included backing vocals by her daughter, Charlotte Gainsbourg. In 2006 Birkin recorded and released the album Fictions, and in 2010, recorded a duet, "Marie," with Brazilian singer Sérgio Dias, which appeared on We Are the Lilies, an album by Dias and French band Tahiti Boy and the Palmtree Family featured contributions from Iggy Pop and others.

In 2016 Birkin appeared in an advertising campaign for Yves Saint Laurent shot by Hedi Slimane which featured various female musicians, including Marianne Faithfull, Courtney Love, and Joni Mitchell. The same year, she had the lead role in La femme et le TGV, a short film directed by Swiss filmmaker Timo von Gunten. The film was nominated for an Academy Award for Best Live Action Short Film. In a 2017 interview, Birkin stated that La femme et le TGV would be her final acting performance and that she had no plans to return to acting.

On 24 March 2017, Birkin released Birkin/Gainsbourg: Le Symphonique, a collection of songs Gainsbourg had written for her during and after their relationship, reworked with full orchestral arrangements. In September 2017, she performed live in Brussels to promote the album.

== Personal life ==
On 16 October 1965, 18-year-old Birkin married British composer and conductor John Barry, 13 years her senior, in a private ceremony at Chelsea Register Office, London. They met in 1964 when Barry cast Birkin in his musical Passion Flower Hotel. Their daughter was photographer Kate Barry (1967–2013). Barry "turned out to be a cold and unfaithful husband" and Birkin wrote in her diary, aged 19, "The feeling of being unwanted, undesired and unloved is beginning to strangle me". Their marriage ended in 1968. She said she was insecure during the relationship and "couldn't believe that this sophisticated, talented genius chose [her] and not any of the other girls." She did not want him to see her with her "tiny, piggy eyes" so she would sleep with an eye pencil under her pillow and put it on if he woke up in the night. He eventually went to the United States and left Birkin with their daughter in England.

Birkin had a romantic and creative relationship with French musician Serge Gainsbourg, 18 years her senior, whom she met on the set of Slogan in 1968. They were together for 12 years but never married, despite rumours and misreporting to the contrary. She eventually became a French citizen.

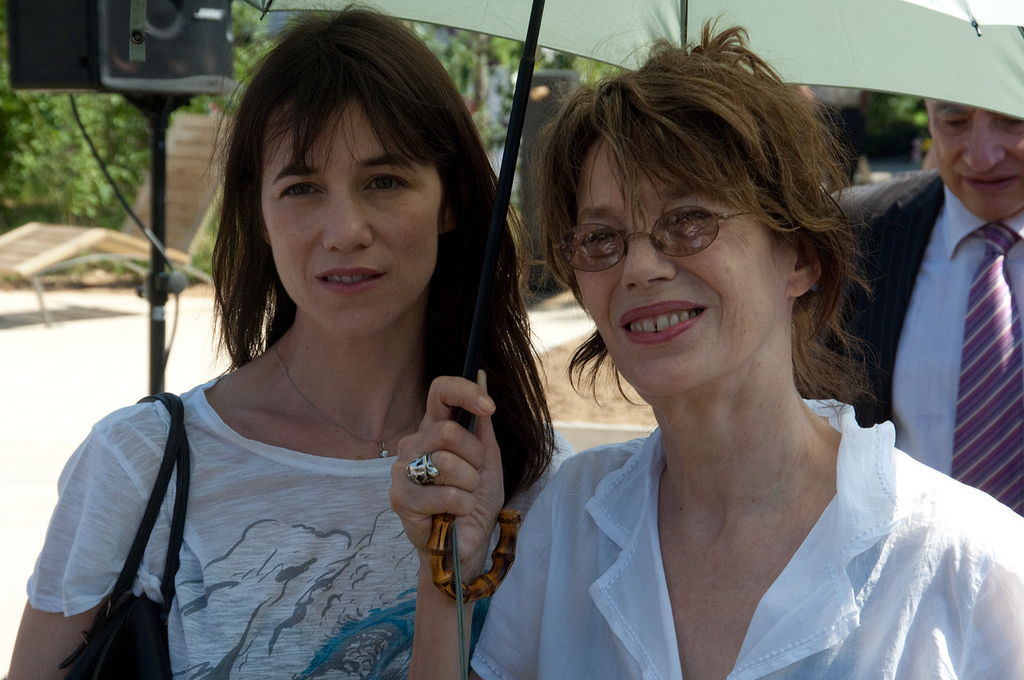
Birkin with her second daughter Charlotte Gainsbourg in 2010

In 1971, Birkin and Gainsbourg had a daughter, actress and singer Charlotte Gainsbourg. The couple separated in 1980, a result of his alcoholism and violence. She described him as "a very difficult man to live with", and said that during recording sessions he would scream at her and hit her with a ruler if she could not sing a part. She took credit for helping him to develop his style later in life, saying: "It's all about me, he listened to me a lot."

On 4 September 1982, she gave birth to her third daughter, Lou Doillon, from her relationship with director Jacques Doillon. She said: "Meeting Jacques was a real turning point in my career. In my private life, after I left Serge, Jacques and I lived together for thirteen years, and had Lou." She said she was surprised and happy to find out that Doillon was not "an old man". They separated in 1993. The Observer reported in 2007 that Doillon "could not compete with her grief for Gainsbourg" (who died in 1991), and that she had lived alone since their separation. Birkin said that Doillon lost interest in casting her in his movies, and she felt "pain for Jacques going off with all these young girls making all these films all the time". Later, Birkin had a relationship with French writer Olivier Rolin.

Birkin became a political activist, and joined protest marches through the streets of Paris against racism and in defence of illegal immigrants. She also supported Palestinian rights, Amnesty International and the fight against AIDS. In 2001 she received an OBE award at Buckingham Palace in London. In 2004 she was awarded France's Ordre national du Mérite.

In 2002, she was diagnosed with leukemia and underwent rounds of treatment. Birkin often spent time with her six grandchildren. Her daughter, Kate Barry, died in December 2013 after falling from her own fourth floor Paris apartment in what was suspected to be a suicide.

Birkin mainly resided in Paris from the late 1960s onward. She was described as "a fixture of the Saint-Germain-des-Prés neighbourhood on the Left Bank". In 2020, recalling 1970s Paris, she said: "it was a time of great innocence, and I don't think social problems were as they are today." On 6 September 2021, it was reported that Birkin was doing well after having a stroke.

=== Death ===
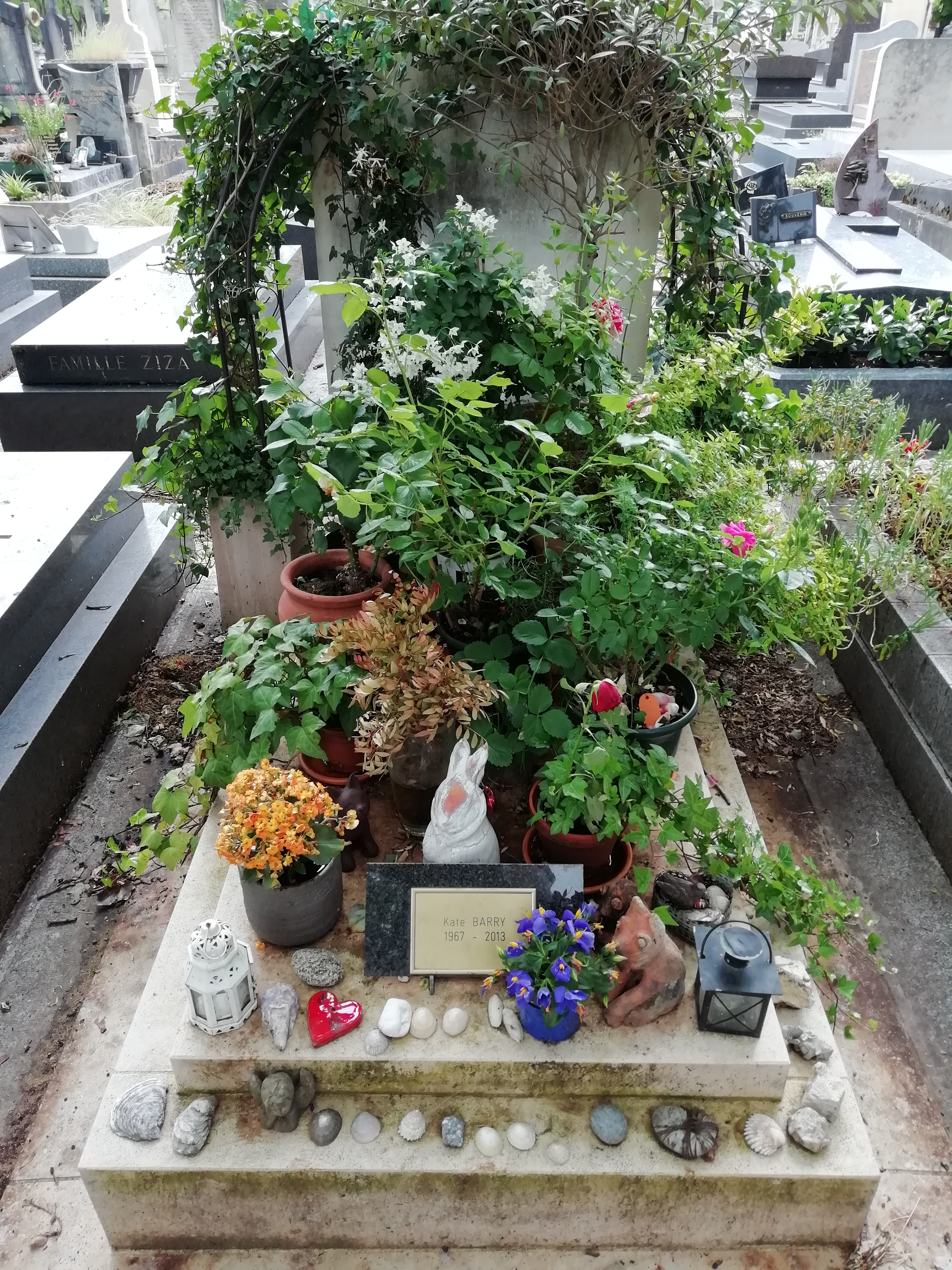
The grave of Kate Barry and Jane Birkin in Cimetière Montparnasse in Paris

On 16 July 2023, Birkin was found dead at home in Paris. She was 76. No cause of death was disclosed. The premiere of the documentary Jane by Charlotte, about Birkin's relationship with her daughter Charlotte, on 8 July 2021, was one of her last public appearances. Her funeral took place at the Church of Saint-Roch in the 1st arrondissement of Paris on the morning of 24 July. After the funeral, her remains were cremated at the crematorium of Père Lachaise Cemetery and her ashes were interred at Montparnasse Cemetery, in the grave of her daughter, Kate Barry, in the same cemetery where Gainsbourg was buried.

Many fans gathered to watch the ceremony on a large screen outside of the church. France's First Lady Brigitte Macron and Minister of Culture Rima Abdul Malak, Catherine Deneuve and her daughter Chiara Mastroianni; Vanessa Paradis; Maïwenn; Sandrine Kiberlain; Carole Bouquet; Charlotte Rampling and Anthony Vaccarello were among those who attended.

=== Philanthropy ===
Birkin's humanitarian interests led her to work with Amnesty International on immigrant welfare and the HIV/AIDS epidemic. Countries she visited included Bosnia, Rwanda and Israel.

=== Political views and activism ===
As a child, Birkin demonstrated in the streets of London against capital punishment. In the 1970s, she campaigned for the right to abortion and appeared at the Bobigny trial in support of four women accused of having helped the high school student Marie-Claire Chevalier to have an abortion following a rape.

Birkin participated in nationwide protests denouncing the qualification of far-right candidate, Jean-Marie Le Pen. In 2017, she performed at a free concert at the Place de la République organised in opposition to Le Pen in the 2017 presidential election.

Birkin denounced the French government's policy towards illegal immigrants in 2010. The same year, she protested outside the residence of the Minister of Immigration, Éric Besson. She also announced that she was sponsoring a young Congolese who had requested political asylum. In 2015, she marched in Paris in support of refugees.

In September 2018, following the resignation of French environment minister Nicolas Hulot, Birkin was one of the 200 artists and scientists who signed an open letter published on the front page of the daily Le Monde titled "The Greatest Challenge in the History of Mankind", which urged politicians to act "firmly and immediately" in fighting climate change and the "collapse of biodiversity".

In late 2022, Birkin, among other French women, cut her hair in support of Iranian women and girls who had been killed in protests at the death of Mahsa Amini after her arrest by Iranian morality police.

== Awards and honours ==
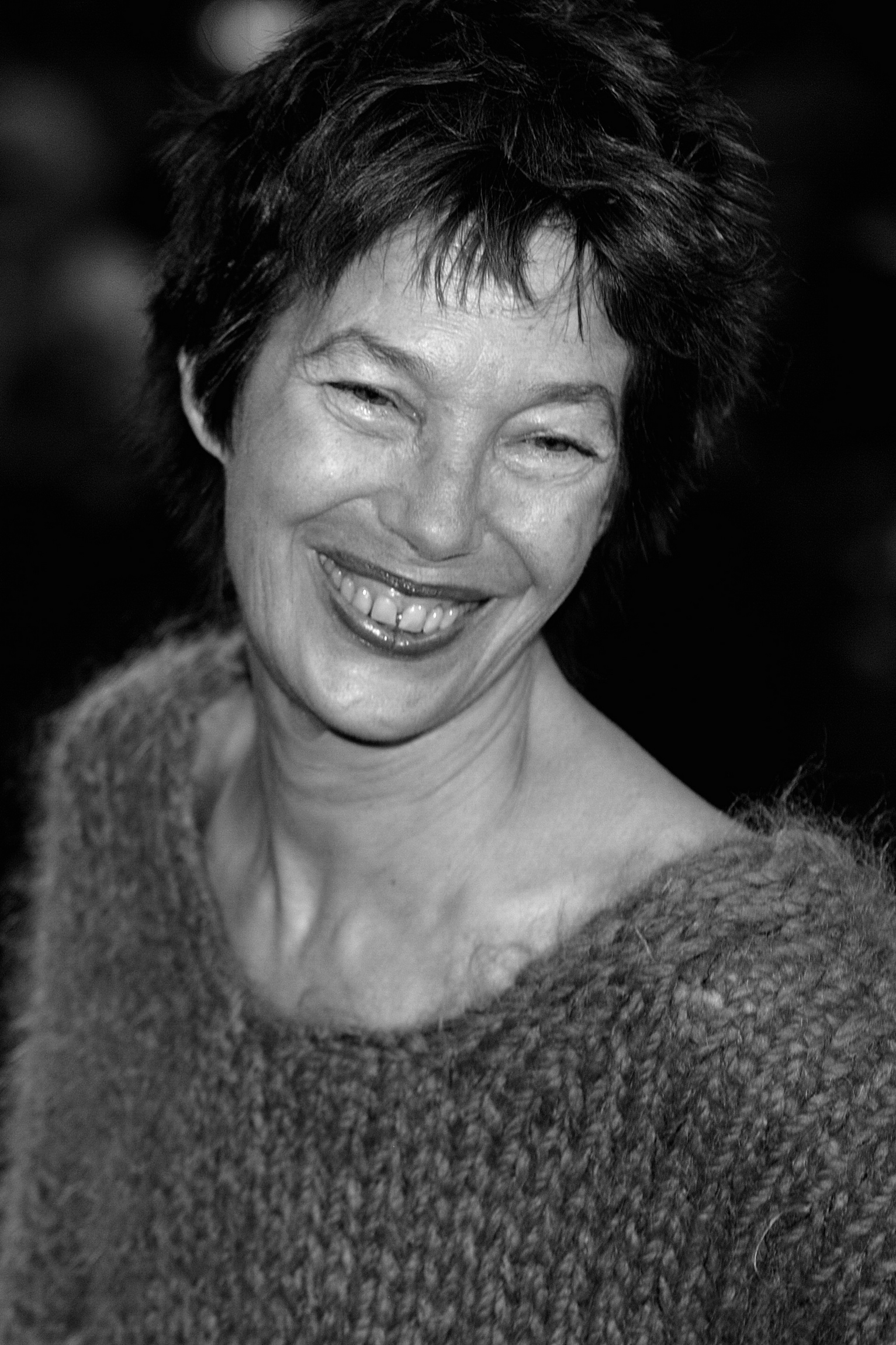
Birkin at the 2009 Venice Film Festival

Birkin won the "Best Actress" award at the 1985 Orleans Film Festival for Leave All Fair. The jury of the 1985 Venice Film Festival recognised Birkin's performance in Dust as amongst the best of the year. They decided not to award a best actress prize because all of the actresses they judged to have made the best performances were in films that won major awards. Dust won the Silver Lion prize.

In the diplomatic and overseas list of the 2001 Birthday Honours, Birkin was appointed an Officer of the Order of the British Empire "for services to acting and UK-French cultural relations". She received the Order from the Prince of Wales in April 2002.

In 2013, she and her daughter, Lou Doillon, were appointed to the Ordre des Arts et des Lettres as Chevaliers. In 2022, she was raised to the highest rank in the order, Commandeur. She was also awarded the French Ordre National du Mérite in 2004 and 2015.

In 2018, she was awarded the Order of the Rising Sun in the Spring Conferment for her efforts in promoting cultural exchanges between Japan and France.

== In popular culture ==
=== Birkin basket ===
Birkin was described as having carried a hand-woven straw basket from Castro Marim in Algarve, Portugal, everywhere she went, from the market, to nightclubs, to formal events until her partner Jacques Doillon intentionally ran over it with his car in the early 1980s.

=== Birkin bag ===
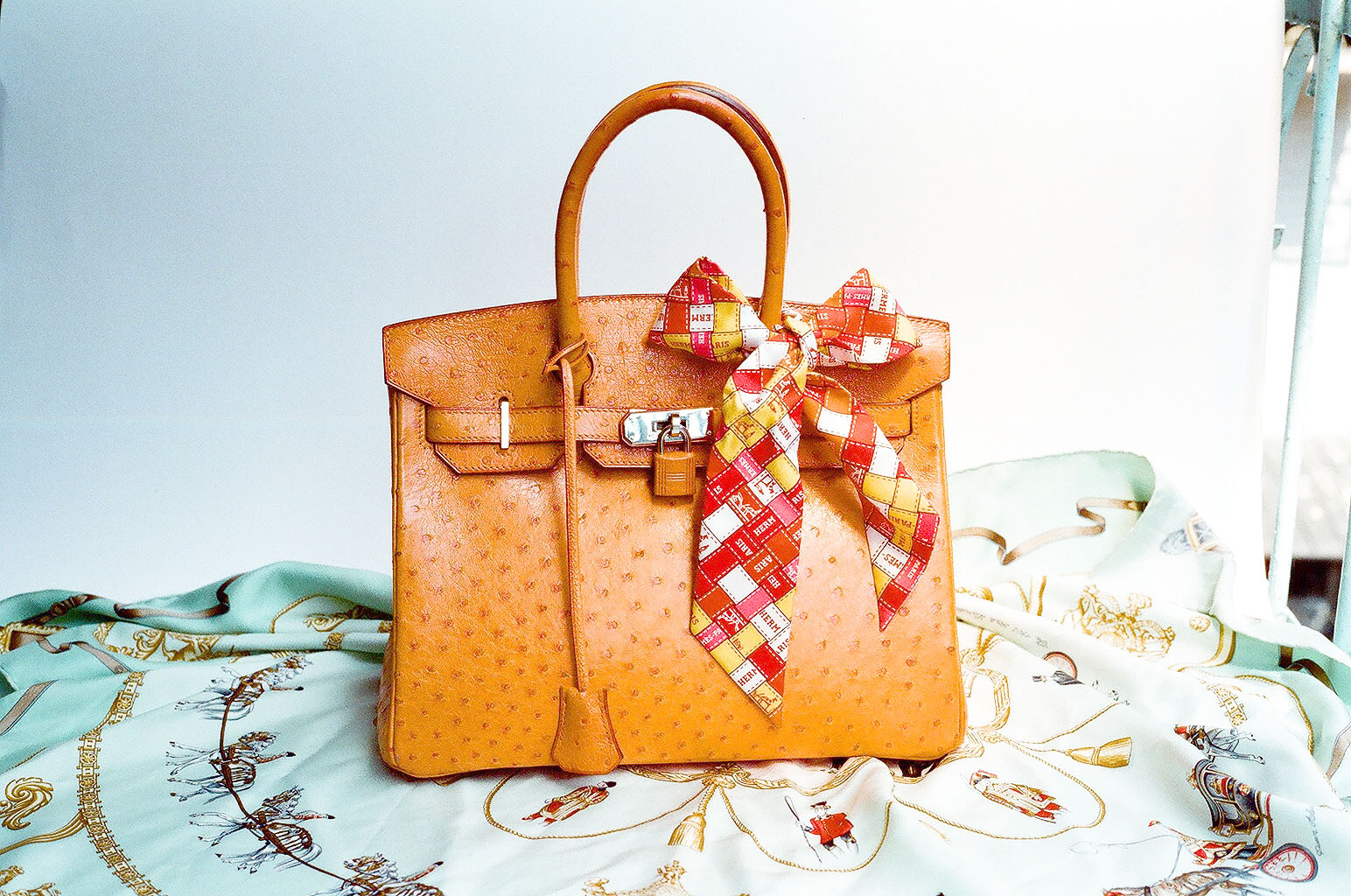
Hermès ostrich Birkin bag

In 1983, Hermès chief executive Jean-Louis Dumas was seated next to Birkin on a flight from Paris to London. Birkin had placed her straw basket in the overhead compartment of her seat and the contents fell out onto the floor, leaving her scrambling to recover them. Birkin told Dumas that it had been difficult to find a leather weekend bag she liked. She sketched a design for her ideal bag for Dumas and said it should have pockets. In 1984 Dumas created a black supple leather bag for her, which he called the "Birkin bag". She only owned one of the bags at a time, though she owned several over the course of her life: "What's the use of having a second one?" she said laughingly. "You only need one and that busts your arm; they're bloody heavy. I'm going to have an operation for tendinitis in the shoulder." Birkin continued to use the bag and ultimately owned five.

Over the years the Birkin bag became a status symbol, with prices ranging from US$10,000 to $500,000. In July 2025 one of Birkin's original five bags was sold in a 10-minute auction in Paris for 8.6 million euros (£7.4 million) to a private collector in Japan. The expected top price had been 2 million euros. The bag's condition was described as "faded and scuffed" and well-used, with scratches, holes, and residue from Birkin's ownership.

In 2015, Birkin wrote a public letter to Hermès requesting that her name be removed from the bag, stating she wanted the company to "debaptise the Birkin Croco until better practices in line with international norms can be put in place", referring to the cruel methods used to acquire skins for the crocodile variant of the bags. Hermès announced soon afterwards that it had satisfied Birkin with new reassurances.

=== Song: "Jane Birkin" ===
Four months after Birkin's death, singer-songwriter Mika released the single "Jane Birkin" from his first French language album, Que ta tête fleurisse toujours ("May Your Head Always Bloom"). Mika said the song, a tribute to Birkin, was about "being yourself, expressing yourself, being honest, being poetic, being daring, daring to be daring, while remaining poetic and artistic.”

=== Passerelle Jane Birkin ===
On 13 December 2025, the "passerelle des Douanes", the oldest bridge crossing the Canal Saint-Martin in the 10th arrondissement of Paris was renamed to "passerelle Jane Birkin". Her daughters Charlotte Gainsbourg and Lou Doillon attended the renaming ceremony.

== Discography ==
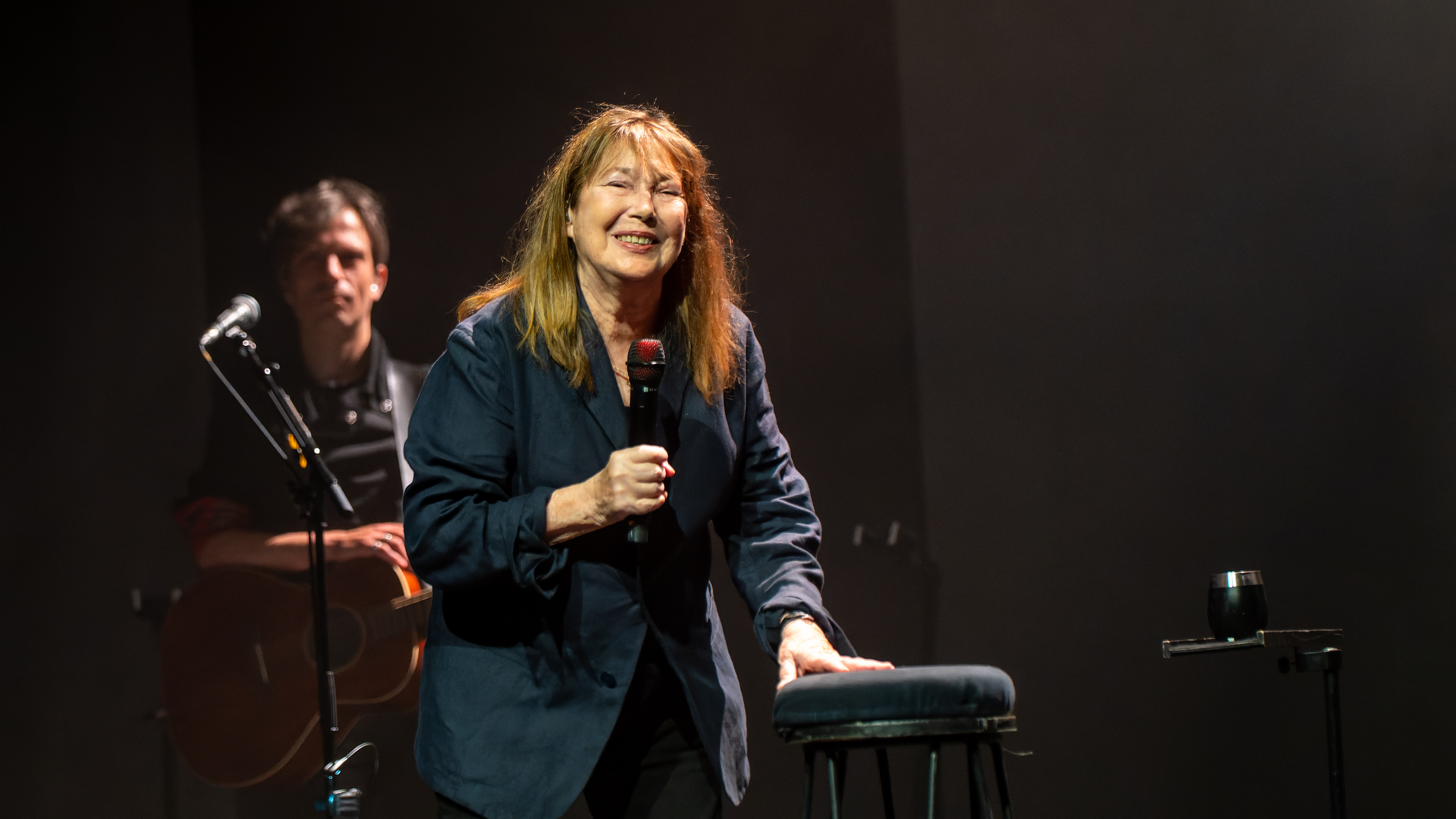
Birkin onstage in 2022

Studio albums

- Jane Birkin/Serge Gainsbourg (1969; with Serge Gainsbourg)
- Di doo dah (1973)
- Lolita Go Home (1975)
- Ex fan des sixties (1978)
- Baby Alone in Babylone (1983)
- Lost Song (1987)
- Amours des feintes (1990)
- Versions Jane (1996)
- À la légère (1999)
- Rendez-vous (2004)
- Fictions (2006)
- Enfants d'Hiver (2008)
- Oh! Pardon tu dormais... (2020)

Live albums

- Jane Birkin au Bataclan (1987)
- Intégral au Casino de Paris (1992)
- Intégral à l'Olympia (1996)
- Arabesque (2002)
- Au palace (live) (2009)
- Jane Birkin Sings Serge Gainsbourg via Japan (2012)

== Filmography ==
=== Film ===
Year	Title	Role	Notes
1965	The Knack ...and How to Get It	Girl on a motorbike	Uncredited
1966	The Idol	A blonde	Uncredited
1966	Kaleidoscope	Exquisite Thing	
1966	Blowup	The Blonde	
1968	Wonderwall	Penny Lane	
1969	La Piscine	Penelope	
1969	Les Chemins de Katmandou	Jane	
1969	Slogan	Evelyne	
1970	Too Small Ticky	Christine Mars / Christine Devone	
1970	Cannabis	Jane Swenson	Also known as: French Intrigue
1970	May Morning	Flora Finlake	Also known as: Alba Pagana
1971	Devetnaest djevojaka i jedan mornar	Milja	
1971	Romance of a Horsethief	Naomi	
1972	Trop jolies pour être honnêtes	Christine	
1973	Seven Deaths in the Cat's Eye	Corringa	
1973	Don Juan, or If Don Juan Were a Woman	Clara	
1973	Dark Places	Alta	
1973	Private Screening	Kate / Hélène	
1974	Le Mouton enragé	Marie-Paule	
1974	How to Do Well When You are a Jerk and a Crybaby	Jane	
1974	Serious as Pleasure	Ariane Berg	
1974	Lucky Pierre	Jackie Logan	Also known as: I'm Losing My Temper
1975	The Wild Goose Chase	Janet	
1975	Catherine et Compagnie	Catherine	
1975	7 morts sur ordonnance	Jane Berg	
1976	Burnt by a Scalding Passion	Virginia Vismara	
1976	Je t'aime moi non plus	Johnny	Nominated – César Award for Best Actress
1977	L'Animal	Female film star	
1978	Death on the Nile	Louise Bourget	
1979	Au bout du bout du banc	Peggy	
1979	Melancoly Baby	Olga	
1979	La miel	Inés	
1980	Egon Schiele – Excess and Punishment	Wally Neuzil	
1981	The Prodigal Daughter	Anne	
1981	Rends-moi la clé!	Catherine	
1982	Evil Under the Sun	Christine Redfern	
1982	Nestor Burma, Shock Detective	Hélène Chatelain	
1983	Circulez y a rien à voir!	Hélène Duvernet	
1983	L'ami de Vincent	Marie-Pierre	
1983	Love on the Ground	Emily	
1984	Le garde du corps	Barbara Penning	
1984	The Pirate	Alma	Nominated – César Award for Best Actress
1985	Dust	Magda	
1985	Between the Devil and the Deep Blue Sea	Nikos' former love	Voice role
1985	Beethoven's Nephew	Johanna	
1985	Leave All Fair	Katherine Mansfield	
1986	La Femme de ma vie	Laura	
1987	Kung-Fu Master	Mary–Jane	
1987	Keep Your Right Up	Fun-loving woman	
1987	Comedy!	Her	
1988	Jane B. par Agnès V.	Herself / Calamity Jane / Claude Jade / Joan of Arc	
1990	Daddy Nostalgie	Caroline	
1991	La Belle Noiseuse	Liz	Nominated – César Award for Best Supporting Actress
1995	One Hundred and One Nights	Madame Radin	
1997	Same Old Song	Jane	
1998	A Soldier's Daughter Never Cries	Mrs. Fortescue	
1999	The Last September	Francie Montmorency	
2001	A Hell of a Day	Jane	
2002	Merci Docteur Rey	Pénélope	
2003	The Very Merry Widows	Renée	
2006	Boxes	Anna	Herself
2009	36 Views from the Pic Saint-Loup	Kate	
2010	Thelma, Louise et Chantal	Nelly	
2012	Twice Born	Psychologist	
2013	Nobody's Daughter Haewon	Herself	
2013	Quai d'Orsay	Molly Hutchinson	
2016	Whoever Was Using This Bed	The Caller	Short film
2016	La Femme et le TGV	Elise	Short film
2020	Paolo Conte Via von me		
2021	Jane by Charlotte	Herself	

=== Television ===
Year	Title	Role	Notes
1965	Armchair Mystery Theatre	Anthea Langridge	Episode: "That Finishing Touch"
1967–68	Armchair Theatre	Babs / Judy	Episodes: "Recount"; "Poor Cherry"
1974	Bons baisers de Tarzan	Jeanne	Television film
1985	La fausse suivante	La Comtesse	Television film
1988	Médecins des hommes	Joy	Episode: "Mer de Chine: Le pays pour mémoire"
1990	L'ex-femme de ma vie	Aurélie	Television film
1991	Red Fox	Violet Harrison	Miniseries
2000	Cinderella	Mab	Television film
2006	Les aventuriers des mers du Sud	Fanny Stevenson	Television film
2011–13	Les saisons meurtrières	Lili Rousseau	Miniseries. Episodes: "Hiver rouge" and "Bleu catacombes"

== See also ==
- Birkin bag
- Serge Gainsbourg discography
