= Amours des feintes =

Studio album by Jane Birkin
- Released: September 1990
- Recorded: Garage Studio, Woldingham, Surrey; Studio Marcadet, Paris
- Label: Philips
- Producer: Philippe Lerichomme

Jane Birkin chronology
Jane Birkin au Bataclan (1987)	Amours des feintes (1990)	Integral au Casino de Paris (1992)

Amours des feintes is an album by Jane Birkin. The album was released in 1990 and was the last original album of songs written by Serge Gainsbourg. This duo was described by Karim Demigneux as "a cabbage-headed man and an Englishwoman on the continent", adding that "when it comes to French song, there's almost nothing better".

On the cover of the album, there is a portrait of Birkin. Gainsbourg made it while he was in an emotional state of mind, and that's why there are stains on the drawing because of the breaking of the pen.

== Track listing ==
All lyrics and music by Serge Gainsbourg

1. Et quand bien même (4:16)
2. Des ils et des elles (2:48)
3. Litanie en lituanie (3:20)
4. L'Impression du déja-vu (3:55)
5. Asphalte (3:44)
6. Tombée des nues (3:06)
7. Un amour peut en cacher un autre (3:18)
8. 32 Fahrenheit (3:23)
9. Love Fifteen (3:10)
10. Amours des feintes (4:29)

== Personnel ==
- Jane Birkin - vocals
- Alan Parker - guitar, arranger
- Andy Pask - bass
- Barry Morgan - drums
- Graham Todd - keyboards
- Frank Ricotti - percussion
- Bob Saker - backing vocals
- Tony Burrows - backing vocals

Painting by Serge Gainsbourg - Artwork by Pearl Cholley and Philippe Huart
