= Sir Thomas Birkin, 1st Baronet =

British lace manufacturer (1831–1922)

Sir Thomas Birkin Bt JP DL
- Born: Thomas Isaac Birkin; 15 February 1831
- Died: 16 January 1922 (aged 90)
- Resting place: Wilford Hill Cemetery, West Bridgford, Nottingham
- Occupation: Lace manufacturer
- Board member of: Great Northern Railway
- Spouse: Harriet Tebbutt (m. 1856)
- Children: 9
- Parent: Richard Birkin
- Relatives: Freda Dudley Ward (granddaughter)

Sir Thomas Isaac Birkin, 1st Baronet JP DL (15 February 1831 – 16 January 1922) was a British lace manufacturer, living in Nottingham.

== Early life ==
He was born on 15 February 1831, the second son of Richard Birkin (1805–1870), who founded the family lace-making business.

== Career ==
After his father retired in 1856, his sons Richard Jr and Thomas took over, until Richard Jr retired in 1862, and Thomas was left in sole charge.

By 1898, the business had been split into two companies, Birkin and Co (fancy lace), and T. I. Birkin and Co (lace curtains), both headquartered at Broadway, Nottingham. They had expanded internationally, with large factories in Saxony and Chester, Pennsylvania, US.

Birkin was a magistrate, and a Deputy Lieutenant of Nottinghamshire, of which he was the High Sheriff in 1892. He was a director of the Great Northern Railway.

== Personal life ==
He married Harriet Tebbutt (1835–1921), on 9 October 1856, and they had nine children:

- Sir Thomas Stanley Birkin, 2nd Baronet (1857–1931)
- Sir Alexander Russell Birkin, 4th Baronet (1861–1942)
- Lt-Col Richard Leslie Birkin (1863–1936)
- Harriet Maud Birkin (1864–1951)
- Colonel Charles Wilfred Birkin (1865–1932); married American Claire Lloyd Howe. One of their daughters was English socialite Freda Dudley Ward, who was the mistress of the Prince of Wales prior to his meeting Wallis Simpson.
- Hilda Mary Birkin (1868–1926)
- Major Philip Austen Birkin (1869–1951)
- Major Harry Laurence Birkin (1872–1951); married Olive Russell (1882–1960). Grandfather of Jane Birkin and David Birkin. Great-grandfather of Kate Barry, Charlotte Gainsbourg and Lou Doillon.
- Ethel Lillian Birkin (1874–1972)

He died on 16 January 1922, and is buried in the grade II listed Birkin Mausoleum, a small classical temple built in 1921 of Portland stone in Wilford Hill Cemetery, West Bridgford, Nottingham.

Baronetage of the United Kingdom
New creation	Baronet (of Ruddington Grange); 1905–1922	Succeeded by Thomas Birkin
