= Ex fan des sixties =

Studio album by Jane Birkin
- Released: February 1978
- Recorded: August 1977
- Studio: Phonogram (London, UK)
- Label: Fontana
- Producer: Philippe Lerichomme

Jane Birkin chronology
Lolita Go Home (1975)	Ex fan des sixties (1978)	Baby Alone in Babylone (1983)

Ex-fan des sixties is an album by Jane Birkin. The album was released in 1978. All songs on the album were written by Serge Gainsbourg and produced by Philippe Lerichomme. "Dépressive" was inspired by "Sonate n°8, opus 13" by Ludwig van Beethoven. Birkin has said that she had difficulties recording the album and that they had to stop recording and start again six months later.

== Track listing ==
All tracks are written by Serge Gainsbourg.

No.	Title	Length
1.	"Ex-fan des sixties"	3:00
2.	"Apocalypstick"	2:35
3.	"Exercice en forme de Z"	2:30
4.	"Mélodie interdite"	3:10
5.	"L'Aquoiboniste"	2:18
6.	"Vie et résurrection d'un amour passion"	3:07
7.	"Nicotine"	2:30
8.	"Rocking Chair"	2:12
9.	"Dépressive"	3:40
10.	"Le Velour des vierges"	2:59
11.	"Classée X"	2:07
12.	"Mélo mélo"	2:45

2001 reissue edition bonus track
No.	Title	Length
13.	"Ballade de Johnny-Jane"	2:43
14.	"Raccrochez c'est une horreur" (with Serge Gainsbourg)	3:14
15.	"Yesterday Yes A Day (Bande originale du film Madame Claude)"	2:59
Total length:		42:00

== Personnel ==
- Jane Birkin - vocals
- Brian Odgers - bass
- Dougie Wright - drums
- Jim Lawless - percussion
- Alan Hawkshaw - arrangements, conductor

Technical

- Peter Olliff - engineer
- Serge Gainsbourg - artwork
- André Berg - photography
