= Baby Alone in Babylone =

Studio album by Jane Birkin
- Released: October 1983
- Recorded: August 1983
- Studio: Studio Continental, London
- Length: 27:57
- Label: Philips
- Producer: Philippe Lerichomme

Jane Birkin chronology
Ex fan des sixties (1978)	Baby Alone in Babylone (1983)	Lost song (1987)

Baby Alone in Babylone is an album by Jane Birkin. The album was released in 1983 and was the first collaboration between Birkin and Serge Gainsbourg since their split. Michelle de Rouville was credited for the photography.

== Track listing ==
All tracks written by Serge Gainsbourg

1. "Baby Lou"
2. "Fuir le bonheur de peur qu'il ne se sauve"
3. "Partie perdue"
4. "Norma Jean Baker"
5. "Haine pour aime"
6. "Overseas Telegram"
7. "Con c'est con ces consequences"
8. "En rire de peur d'être obligée d'en pleurer"
9. "Rupture au miroir"
10. "Les Dessous Chics"
11. "Baby Alone in Babylone"
- "Baby Lou": words by Serge Gainsbourg, music by Alain Chamfort and Michel Pelay. This song had previously appeared on Chamfort's 1977 album Rock'n Rose.
- "Baby alone in Babylone": words by Serge Gainsbourg, music based on the 3rd movement of the 3rd symphony by Johannes Brahms

== Personnel ==
- Jane Birkin - vocals
- Alan Parker - guitar
- Brian Odgers - bass
- Dougie Wright - drums
- Alan Hawkshaw - keyboards, arrangements, conductor
- Jim Lawless - percussion

Technical

- Philippe Lerichomme - producer
- Dick Plant, Dominique Blanc-Francard - engineer
- Michelle de Rouville - photography
