= Kung Fu Master (film) =

1988 film

- Film poster
- Directed by: Agnès Varda
- Written by: Jane Birkin; Agnès Varda
- Starring: Jane Birkin; Mathieu Demy
- Cinematography: Pierre-Laurent Chénieux
- Edited by: Marie-Josée Audiard
- Distributed by: Capital Cinéma
- Release date: 9 March 1988
- Running time: 80 minutes
- Country: France
- Language: French

Kung Fu Master (stylised as Kung-fu Master!, also known as Le petit amour in France) is a 1988 French drama film directed by Agnès Varda. It was selected to compete for the Golden Bear at the 38th Berlin International Film Festival.

== Plot ==
Mary-Jane (Jane Birkin) comes across Julien (Mathieu Demy) during a party her teenage daughter Lucy (Charlotte Gainsbourg, Birkin's actual daughter) throws at their home. Julien has drunk too much and Mary-Jane induces vomiting to help him feel better. Intrigued by him, she goes to visit Lucy at school to find out if she can see him again and almost hits him with her car. On the pretext of seeing if he is alright, Mary-Jane takes Julien to a café where he plays his favourite arcade game, Kung Fu Master. Intrigued by Julien and knowing she wants to see him again, Mary-Jane goes searching for other places with the game. Before she can think of a different reason to see Julien however, he comes to her home and they spend the day together shopping. Julien kisses Mary-Jane's hand at the end of the day.

At school, Julien and Lucy must work together on a project. Since he is so eager to work on the project, she thinks that he has a crush on her.

Mary-Jane and Julien continue to think of ways to be near one another. When Mary-Jane overhears Lucy talking about Julien missing school, she visits his home to give him his homework and allows him to fondle her breast. He later invites her out to celebrate with him and takes her to a hotel where he kisses her. Mary-Jane resists, but later slaps him after he begins smoking in the elevator and runs away from him.

While working on a project with Lucy, Julien learns that she is going to England with her family over the upcoming holidays. Julien manages to convince Lucy to invite him along. On Easter, while she is hiding eggs, Mary-Jane is surprised by Julien. The two end up kissing and are found by Lucy who is horrified by the fact that her mother is kissing a 14 year old boy. After telling her mother what has happened, Mary-Jane is encouraged by her to take Julien and her youngest daughter Lou to a remote island where the family owns a home to try and play out their flirtation. On the island, the two of them declare their love for one another and enjoy a close relationship. At the end of their time on the island, Mary-Jane worries that she will lose Julien and he will forget about her, but he promises to love her forever.

After their return from the island, Julien's mother threatens to press charges while Mary-Jane loses custody of Lucy. Mary-Jane never hears from him again.

Meanwhile at an arcade, Julien finally wins the Kung Fu Master game. He asks an arcade employee to call Mary-Jane and tell her that he has won, but the employee gives up after he calls and Lou answers the phone. Later at his new school when other boys ask if he has ever had a girlfriend, he speaks disparagingly of Mary-Jane, saying she was just a bored housewife he once slept with.

== Cast ==
- Jane Birkin as Mary-Jane
- Mathieu Demy as Julien
- Charlotte Gainsbourg as Lucy
- Lou Doillon as Lou
- Gary Chekchak as a young man
- Cyril Houplain as a young man
- Frank Laurent as a young man
- Aurélien Hermant as Un jeune
- Jérémie Luntz as a young man
- Thomas Bensaïd as a young man
- Pénélope Pourriat a young woman
- Ninon Vinsonneau a young woman
- Bégonia Leis as a young woman
- Eva Simonet as the friend
- Judy Campbell as the mother
- David Birkin as the father

== Production ==
Birkin conceived the film while Agnès Varda was filming her for the documentary Jane B. par Agnès V. Most of the cast were taken from Birkin and Varda's family, with Birkin's real life daughters and parents playing her daughters and parents in the film. Charlotte Gainsbourg later admitted to disliking both the filming of Jane B. par Agnès V. and Kung Fu Master as Varda and her film crew remained camped in her home for a year in order to complete the projects.

== Reception and release ==
In 2015, both Kung Fu Master and Jane B. par Agnès V. were acquired for U.S. distribution by Cinelicious Pics. The films enjoyed a brief theatrical re-release before being streamed on the movie streaming service Fandor. Varda expressed frustration at the film's limited release saying "I can get the Palme d'Or, but I can't get exhibition, so it's a contradiction."
