= Boxes (film) =

- Promotional poster
- Directed by: Jane Birkin
- Written by: Jane Birkin
- Produced by: Emmanuel Giraud
- Starring: Geraldine Chaplin; Michel Piccoli; Jane Birkin; Natacha Régnier; Lou Doillon; Adèle Exarchopoulos; John Hurt; Maurice Bénichou; Tchéky Karyo
- Cinematography: François Catonné
- Edited by: Marie-Josée Audiard
- Music by: Frank Eulry
- Release dates: 21 May 2007 (Cannes); 6 June 2007 (France)
- Running time: 95 min
- Country: France
- Languages: French; English

Boxes (French: Les Boites) is a 2007 French film and the directorial debut of Jane Birkin. Birkin also stars alongside Geraldine Chaplin and Michel Piccoli. The film is based on Birkin's own family life, chronicling three marriages and the three children she bore from these marriages. The title alludes to the way in which she compartmentalises these relationships and stages of her life. The film was nominated for the Grand Prix at the Bratislava International Film Festival. The film premiered in the Un Certain Regard portion of the 2007 Cannes Film Festival on 21 May. It was released in France on 6 June 2007.

== Plot ==
In Brittany, a middle-aged woman, Anna lives in a rambling home with her sometime dead father (Piccoli), her opinionated mother (Chaplin) and the memories of her three grown-up daughters. As Anna struggles with her mid-life crisis, the possessions and photographs in the home begin to spark her memories of childhood and earlier adulthood.

In particular the memories evoked are of her three husbands and the children she bore with them. Her first marriage to Fanny's English father (Hurt) failed and as a consequence, Fanny (Régnier) barely knows him. Fanny's half-sister is Camille (Doillon), who Anna had with Camille's now dead father, Max (Benichou). There is also her third husband, Jean (Karyo), with whom she had Lilly (Exarchopoulos), but he left to pursue affairs.

== Cast ==
- Geraldine Chaplin as Mother
- Michel Piccoli as Father
- Jane Birkin as Anna
- Natacha Régnier as Fanny
- Lou Doillon as Camille
- John Hurt as Fanny's father
- Maurice Bénichou as Max
- Tchéky Karyo as Jean
- Adèle Exarchopoulos as Lilli
- Annie Girardot as Joséphine

== Production ==
Birkin wrote the script for Boxes in 1995, shortly after her father's death. The film was shot in Birkin's own family home in Landéda. Birkin offered the main role of Anna to Chaplin, but Chaplin turned this down, feeling that as the role was written for a 45-year-old woman, she would be better suited to the role of Anna's mother.

== Reception ==
Le Figaro praised the "worrying, unpredictable and touching sincerity" of the film. Michèle Levieux of L'Humanité said that the film was so well written, it deserved to be adapted for the stage.
