= Lolita Go Home =

Studio album by Jane Birkin
- Released: September 1975
- Label: Fontana
- Producer: Philippe Lerichomme

Jane Birkin chronology
| Di doo dah (1973) | Lolita Go Home (1975) | Ex fan des sixties (1978) |

Lolita Go Home is an album by Jane Birkin, released in 1975. Jean-Pierre Sabar arranged the music for the album. About half of the songs were written by composer Serge Gainsbourg with lyrics by Philippe Labro. Their song "Rien pour rien" uses the same melody as Gainsbourg's "Le Cadavre Exquis" (1975). The other half of the album consists of Birkin performing standards from the Great American Songbook.

While the album was largely ignored upon its release, it achieved a cult following among Birkin's fans. The album was included in a 2023 compilation set of Birkin's complete works by the Universal Music Group. Rock & Folk critic Pierre Mikaïloff stated that Birkin weirdly seems more uncomfortable singing in English than she does in French on this album.

== Track listing ==
Music by Serge Gainsbourg, words by Philippe Labro; except where indicated

1. "Lolita Go Home" (3:08)
2. "What Is This Thing Called Love?" (words and music: Cole Porter) - (2:28)
3. "Bebe Song" (2:41)
4. "Where or When" (music: Richard Rodgers; words: Lorenz Hart) - (3:20)
5. "Si ça peut te consoler" (3:01)
6. "Love for Sale" (words and music: Cole Porter) - (3:41)
7. "Just Me and You" (2:45)
8. "La Fille aux claquettes" (words and music: Serge Gainsbourg) - (2:34)
9. "Rien pour rien" (3:06)
10. "French Graffiti" (2:44)
11. "There's a Small Hotel" (music: Richard Rodgers; words: Lorenz Hart) - (3:05)

== Personnel ==
- Jane Birkin - vocals
- Jean-Pierre Sabar - arrangements, conductor
- Jean-Claude Charvier - engineer
- Stephen Sahakian - assistant engineer
- Francis Giacobetti - photography
