= David Birkin =

British artist

- Born: David Tristan Birkin; 21 November 1977 (age 48)
- Education: University of Oxford (BA); University College London (MA); Goldsmiths College London (PhD)
- Occupation: Artist
- Father: Andrew Birkin
- Relatives: Anno Birkin (half-brother); Judy Campbell (grandmother); Jane Birkin (aunt); Charlotte Gainsbourg (cousin); Kate Barry (cousin); Lou Doillon (cousin)
- Website: www.davidbirkin.net

David Tristan Birkin (born 21 November 1977) is a British artist working with photography and performance art. He is a Senior Lecturer at London College of Communication, University of the Arts London. Birkin is the co-founder of Visible Justice, a research platform for artists, activists, writers, journalists, photographers, filmmakers, and human rights lawyers working at the intersection of visual culture and social justice. He has also worked as a motion picture and theatre actor.

== Education ==
Birkin studied human sciences and anthropology at Oxford University (1996–1999). He completed an MA at the Slade School of Fine Art (2009–2011) with a scholarship from the Arts and Humanities Research Council. He is currently a PhD candidate in the Department of Visual Cultures at Goldsmiths College, University of London. He is a Visiting Fellow in Art History at the University of Cambridge.

Birkin was a fellow of the Art and Law Program in New York (2011–2012) and the Independent Study Program at the Whitney Museum of American Art (2012–2013). He was an artist-in-residence at Yaddo in 2013, the MacDowell Colony in 2015, Lower Manhattan Cultural Council's studios on Governors Island in 2016, and the Camargo Foundation in 2020.

== Career ==
=== Photography ===
Much of Birkin's work relates to war. Projects have included a collaboration with the courtroom sketch artist at the Guantanamo military commissions; a digital photographic transcription of identification numbers from the Iraq War civilian casualties database; a photo archive image from Kabul traced to Renaissance lapis lazuli mines in Afghanistan; an extract of CIA legalese in skywriting above Manhattan; and a plane circling the Statue of Liberty's torch towing a banner that read "The Shadow of a Doubt".

Birkin has published photo-essays and articles in Frieze, Cabinet, Creative Time Reports, Ibraaz, Disegno, The Harvard Advocate, and the American Civil Liberties Union blog, on subjects ranging from a legally protected species of iguana roaming freely at Guantanamo Bay detention camp to Marilyn Monroe's 1945 photoshoot at an army drone factory in California.

In 2010 his performance photographs won him the €25,000 Sovereign Art Prize at the Barbican Centre in London.

His show "Mouths at the Invisible Event" at The Mosaic Rooms in London in 2015 was described by Hyperallergic as "a methodical examination of the language, aesthetics, and ethos of modern warfare [that] ultimately makes the emotional reality and Kafkaesque lunacy of such a system hit home".

=== Film and theatre ===
Birkin has also worked as an actor in film, television and theatre. He appeared in two episodes of Star Trek: The Next Generation: in the 1990 episode "Family" as René Picard, Captain Jean-Luc Picard's nephew; and the 1992 episode "Rascals", as a young Jean-Luc Picard. His film credits have included roles in The Return of the Musketeers (1989, as Louis XIV), Impromptu (1991), Les Misérables (1998), All the Queen's Men (2001), Charlotte Gray (2001), and Sylvia (2003). In 2010 he appeared in Ourhouse by Nathaniel Mellors.
