= This Is Where We Came In =

1990 children's play by Alan Ayckbourn

- Original language: English
- Written by: Alan Ayckbourn
- Characters: Great Aunt Repetitus; Uncle Erraticus; Uncle Oblivious; Fred; Nell; Bethany; Talitha; Jenkin; Albert; Kevin on Keyboards
- Subject: Storytelling, re-inventing fairy tales

Premiere
- Date: 4/11 August 1990
- Place: Stephen Joseph Theatre (Westwood site), Scarborough
- Official website

This Is Where We Came In is a 1990 children's play by British playwright Alan Ayckbourn. It is about three storytellers, Great Aunt Repetitus, Uncle Erraticus, Uncle Oblivious, who trap six players in twisted re-interpretations of fairy tales. It was originally presented as a two-parter shown on Saturday mornings, where the plays could be seen out of order, but the two parts were put together and made into a single event in Christmas 1991.

This Is Where We Came In is a chronicle of a group of misfits who have fallen victim to their story-teller overlord's fierce control.
