= Kate Barry (photographer) =

English photographer (1967–2013)

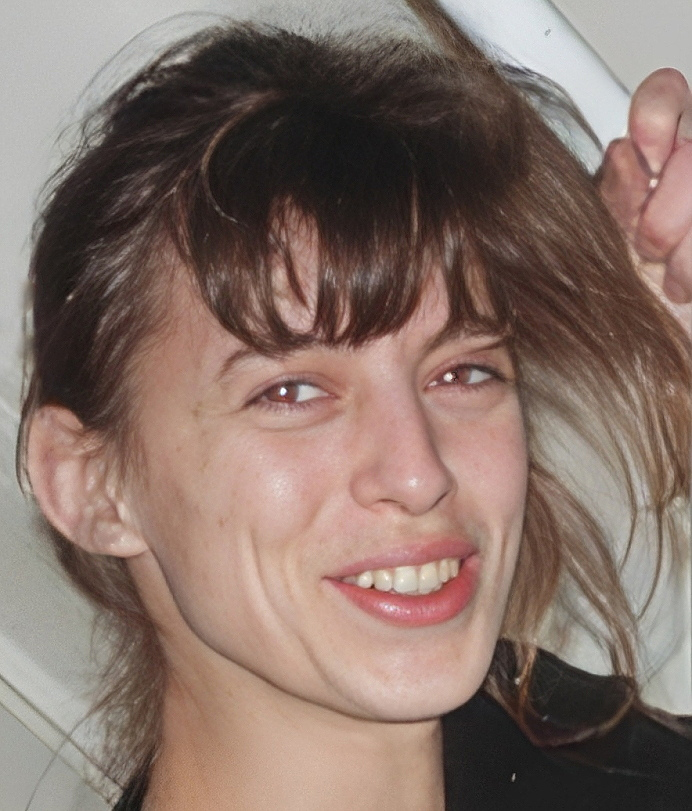
- Barry in 1992
- Born: Kate Prendergast; 8 April 1967; London, England
- Died: 11 December 2013 (aged 46); Paris, France
- Partner: Pascal Huon de Kermadec
- Children: 1
- Parents: John Barry (father); Jane Birkin (mother)
- Relatives: Charlotte Gainsbourg (half-sister); Lou Doillon (half-sister); Judy Campbell (grandmother); Andrew Birkin (uncle); David Birkin (cousin); Anno Birkin (cousin)

Kate Barry (8 April 1967 – 11 December 2013) was a British fashion photographer, who worked for Vogue and The Sunday Times Magazine.

== Life ==
Barry was the daughter of British actress and singer Jane Birkin and the composer John Barry, whose birth surname was Prendergast. Her maternal grandmother was the actress Judy Campbell and her uncle was the director Andrew Birkin. She moved from England to France as a child, and was raised by her mother and her mother's partner Serge Gainsbourg. She was estranged from her birth father until after her mother and Gainsbourg split up in 1980.

Barry had two half-sisters on her mother's side, French actress and singer Charlotte Gainsbourg and actress and singer Lou Doillon. She had two half-sisters on her father's side, Suzy and Sian and a half-brother, Jon-Patrick. In 1987, she gave birth to her only child, a son named Roman de Kermadec, with her partner, Pascal Huon de Kermadec.

== Career ==
Barry was known for her intimate photographs of famous people. She worked frequently with her mother and sisters, and was also responsible for the album cover of Carla Bruni’s debut album Quelqu'un m'a dit.

In 2012, Barry released a book, Dinard: Essai d'autobiographie immobilière, in collaboration with journalist Jean Rolin.

== Death ==
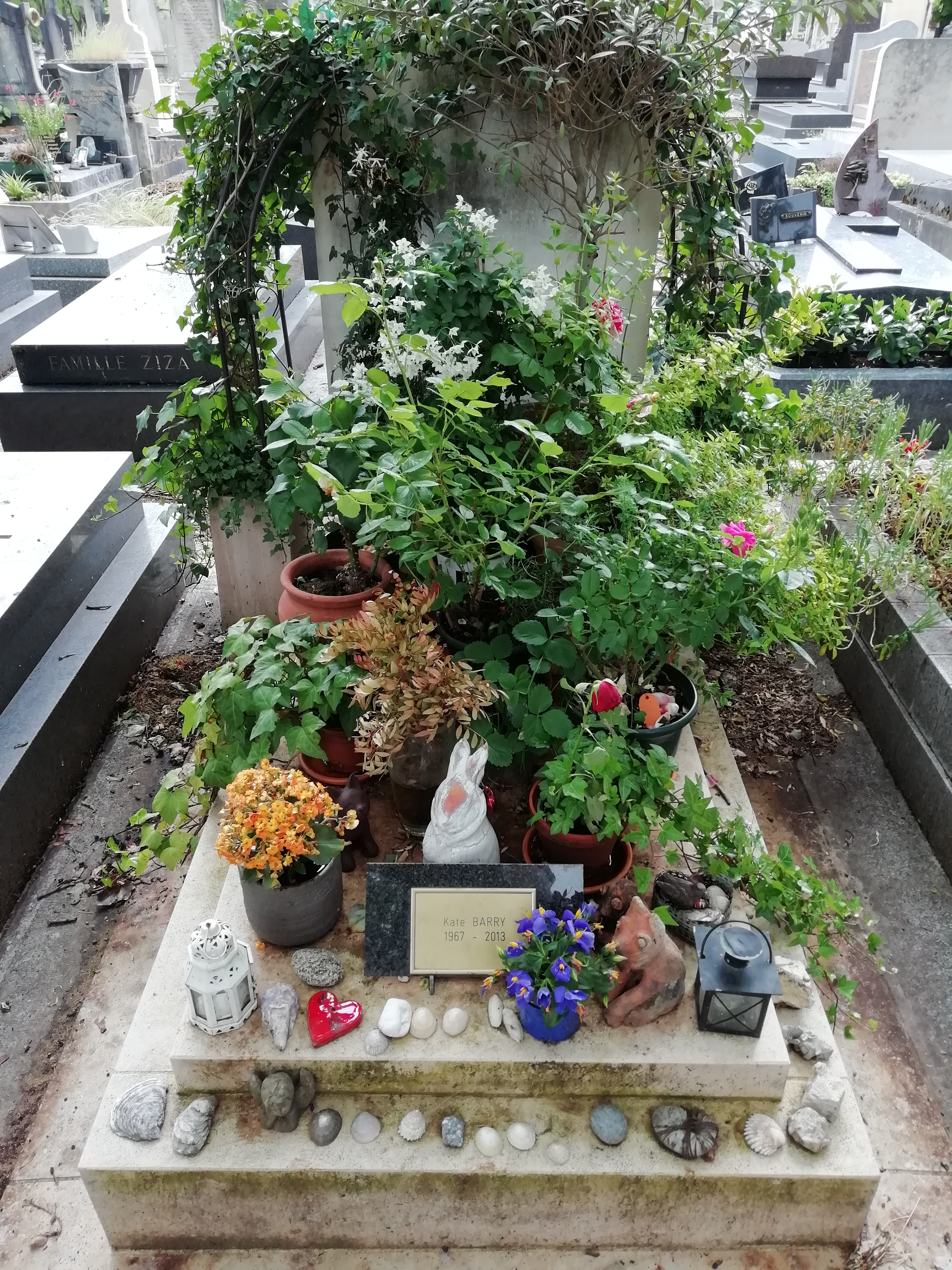
The grave of Kate Barry and Jane Birkin in Cimetière Montparnasse in Paris

Barry was addicted to drugs and alcohol from her teens. In the early 1990s, she founded the charity Aide et Prévention des Toxicodépendances par l’Entraide (APTE) to help drug addicts recover via therapy, which successfully kept her clean for years.

On 11 December 2013, Barry died as a result of a fall from her fourth-floor apartment in the 16th arrondissement of Paris, in what was assumed to be a suicide. Her half-sister Charlotte Gainsbourg later disputed the reports of suicide, saying, "I want to believe it's an accident" but admitting that it was impossible to know whether Barry's death was accidental or a deliberate act. Barry is buried in Paris.
