= Lou Doillon =

French actress and singer (born 1982)

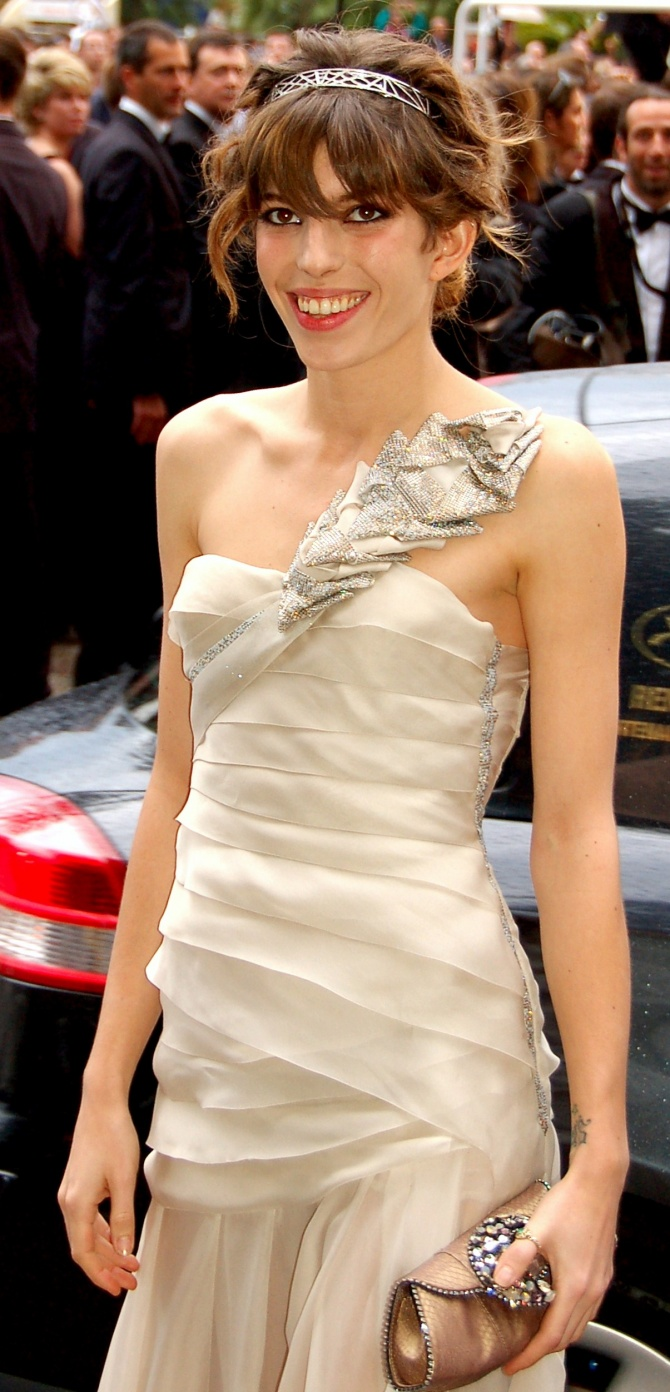
- Doillon in 2008
- Born: 4 September 1982 (age 44); Neuilly-sur-Seine, France
- Occupations: Actress; singer; model
- Years active: 1987–present
- Children: 2
- Parents: Jacques Doillon (father); Jane Birkin (mother)
- Relatives: Kate Barry (maternal half-sister); Charlotte Gainsbourg (maternal half-sister); Lola Doillon (paternal half-sister); Judy Campbell (grandmother); Andrew Birkin (uncle); David Birkin (cousin); Anno Birkin (cousin)

Lou Doillon (French: [lu dwajɔ̃]; born 4 September 1982) is a French-British singer and actress. She is the daughter of French director Jacques Doillon and English actress and singer Jane Birkin.

Doillon started her career as a model during her teenage years and later transitioned into acting and music. In the late 1990s and into the 2000s, she appeared in several French films for which she received recognition for her performances, credits that include Bad Company (1999) and Gigola (2010).

In addition to her acting career, Doillon has pursued a music career, releasing her debut album Places in 2012 to critical acclaim and commercial success. Her music blends elements of folk and indie rock.

== Early life and education ==
Doillon was born on 4 September 1982 in Neuilly-sur-Seine, France. She is the daughter of French writer/director Jacques Doillon and English actress/singer Jane Birkin. She has six brothers and sisters: Kate Barry and Charlotte Gainsbourg on her mother's side, and Lola Doillon, Lili Doillon, Lina Doillon and Lazare Doillon on her father's side. Doillon spent her school years between France and Saint Barthélemy until the age of 15, when she dropped out to become a full-time actress.

== Career ==
=== Film and TV ===
Doillon started acting at age five, starring in Kung Fu Master directed by Agnès Varda. She has since worked with directors including Jean Pierre Améris, Jacques Doillon, Guillaume Canet, Abel Ferrara and Maïwenn.

=== Modelling ===
Doillon started modelling at the age of 16, becoming the ambassador of Givenchy. She has since been the "face" of Vanessa Bruno, Eres, Mango, H&M, Miu Miu, JBrand, Barney's, Gap, Maje and Chloé. She was featured alongside Sophia Loren and Penélope Cruz in the Pirelli Calendar. Doillon has worked with photographers Inez and Vinoodh, Mario Sorrenti, Mario Testino, Terry Richardson, Bruce Webber, Paolo Reversi, Corinne Day, Mert and Marcus, Ryan McGinley and Glen Lunchford. She has collaborated with Lee Cooper and La Redoute as a creative consultant and designer for six collections.

=== Theatre ===
Doillon, alongside director Michel Didym, created a show based on letters written by French authors and singers (Louis-Ferdinand Celine, Marcel Proust and Édith Piaf), and monologues. She toured French-speaking theatres throughout Europe by herself for over two years.

In 2010, Doillon started working with director Arthur Nauzyciel on Samuel Beckett's one sentence monologue "L'Image" in the National Theatre of Orléans. Alongside dancer Damien Jalet and conceptual musician Meelice, they performed throughout France and in New York for the Crossing the Line Festival. In 2017, for the National Theatre of Rennes, Doillon performed "L'Image" directed by Nauzyciel for a week.

Doillon has also collaborated on various performances (Paroles d'Exil/Musique Interdite with the French National Orchestra, Calamity Jane with singer/ musician John Mitchell and as a reader for many French-literature festivals).

=== Art ===
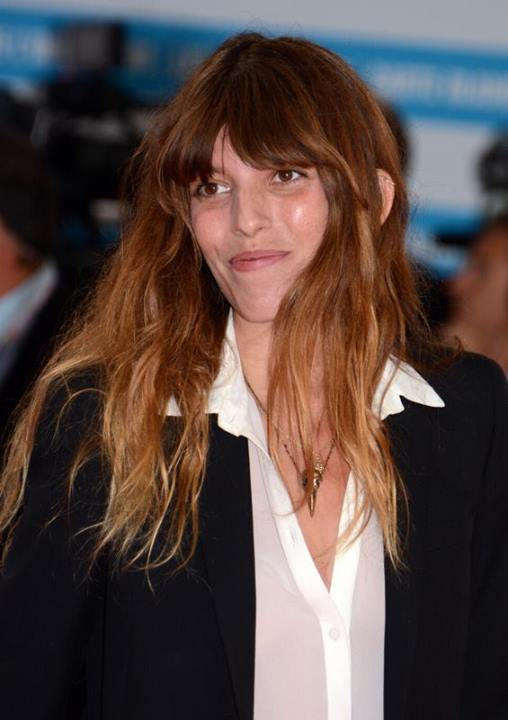
Doillon in 2013

Doillon has been drawing since she was 10 and has often included her drawings in her other crafts (the vinyl edition of her album in 2016 and most of her merchandise on tour is drawn by her). She has been keeping a drawn and written diary since the age of 12. She works with an extra fine Sailor Pen on Sennelier paper or Moleskine diaries.

In September 2017, Doillon released a book, including 80 ink and pencil drawings alongside diary drawings, with Astier de Villatte. The release was followed by an exhibit of the original drawings at La maison Molière in Paris. She has also, for the brand Astier de Villatte, collaborated on a project of 18 different types of hand-backed ceramic mugs and 15 unique pieces, presented and sold in Tokyo during the launch of the collaboration in November 2017 with creative duo Benoit Astier de Villatte and Ivan Pericoli.

=== Music ===
Doillon's love for music was enkindled by her father: "When my parents split, I discovered with Jacques, his taste for eclectic and a strange form of radicalness in music. He would say: 'sit down, shut up and listen to the music' while playing records from Chet Baker, Billie Holiday, Siouxsie and the Banshees, Patti Smith and Nick Drake."

She often quotes Bob Dylan and Leonard Cohen, and mentions Lhasa, Lead Belly, Fiona Apple, Cat Power, Nina Simone, Tim Buckley and Bobbie Gentry as her influences.

Doillon recorded with many musicians in New York and Paris during the 2000s before starting a solo career in 2010. Her genre has been described as haunted folk, and her voice has been described as "equal parts Marianne Faithfull, Nina Simone, Anohni and Joanna Newsom." She writes her songs on Canadian Guild guitars (D55) or the piano and performs on an Eko electric guitar.

==== Places ====
In 2012, Doillon signed her first recording deal for three albums with Barclay (Universal Music France). Her first EP I.C.U came out in June and was produced by Étienne Daho and mixed by Philippe Zdar from the band Cassius.

Doillon's first album was recorded in France over a 15 day period in the Studio La Seine with French musicians François Poggio, Marcello Guliani, Alexis Anérilles and Philippe Entressangle. Her debut album Places reached number three on the French charts. It also reached number one on Canadian iTunes, number two on French iTunes and was released through Verve in the US and decca in the UK. The artwork for the cover was done by Inez and Vinoodh. Doillon was on the cover of influential magazines Magic, Telerama and Les Inrockuptibles. The first single, "I.C.U", was followed by a video directed by Antoine Carlier, reconstituting her wanderings through Paris. Then came "Questions and Answers" directed by Gaetan Chataigner while Doillon was on tour and "Devil or Angel" directed by Christophe Acker in Scotland.

In October 2012, Doillon started her first tour at French rock club La Flèche d'Or and played France, Belgium, Germany, Switzerland, Canada and England. This tour also played at Paris's Le Trianon venue. On 8 February 2013, during the Victoires de la musique ceremony (French equivalent of the Grammy's) at the Zenith of Paris, she was awarded Best Female Performer of the Year, competing alongside prestigious artists such as Françoise Hardy and Celine Dion. It was the first time a newcomer English-speaking performer won in that category. Doillon toured for the rest of 2013, including many festivals (Eurockéennes de Belfort, Francofolies de la Rochelle and Osheaga festival).

==== Lay Low ====
In January 2015, Doillon started recording and co-producing, alongside Timber Timbre frontman Taylor Kirk, her second album in Canada. She recorded in the Montreal mythical studio Hotel2Tango, over a period of a month, with fellow band members of Timber Timbre. She completed the recording between Studio la Seine in Paris and RAK Studios in London. Lay Low was mixed by Nick Launey and Adam Greenspan in Los Angeles in April. The album came out on 9 October, preceded by the first single "Where to Start", which was featured in Jean-Marc Vallée's' movie Demolition (starring Naomi Watts and Jake Gyllenhaal) soundtrack. Doillon was nominated for best rock album of the year at Les Victoires de la musique. The album received critical acclaim in France, Belgium, England, Canada and the US and was released through Verve in the US and decca in the UK. The front cover for the album is a selfie shot by Doillon in bed, and inner pictures were shot during the recording in Canada by French photographer Zelie Noreda.

In 2016, Doillon started a world tour, performing in the US, Canada, Japan, Australia, Korea, Germany, Poland, England and France. She performed on Jools Holland, alongside Iggy Pop and Graham Nash. As a final touch to her world tour, she performed two sold out concerts in La Flèche D'or, named Kitchen Acoustic and Lou Doillon and Friends (performed with fellow musicians Woodkid and Keren Ann).

==== Live ====
Doillon's band includes François Poggio on the guitar, Nicolas Subrechicot on keys, Pierre Lavandon on bass and Franck M'Bouéké on the drums.

In May 2016, Doillon was chosen by John Cale to perform "Femme Fatale" during his tribute show to the Velvet Underground at the Philharmonie de Paris, alongside Mark Lanegan, Saul Williams, Animal Collective, Étienne Daho and The Libertines.

In 2017, Doillon participated in the homage to Leonard Cohen at the MAC, alongside Jarvis Cocker, Chilly Gonzales and Half Moon Run, producing a cover of "Famous Blue Raincoat".

On 3 October 2017, for the 3 Ring Circus with John Grant and Richard Hawley, Doillon performed three acoustic sets by herself at three different venues. On 6 October 2017, she repeated this performance in Sheffield, with Hawley and James Dean Bradfield.

=== Other media ===
In "Pigalle", Doillon serves as the narrator of an audio walking tour of the Paris neighborhood, Quartier Pigalle, a work created by Soundwalk.

== Personal life ==
In 2002, at the age of 19, she gave birth to her son, whom she had with the musician Thomas-John Mitchell. Marlowe is named after Christopher Marlowe. She gave birth to another boy in 2022, whose father is the illustrator Stéphane Manel.

== Partial filmography ==
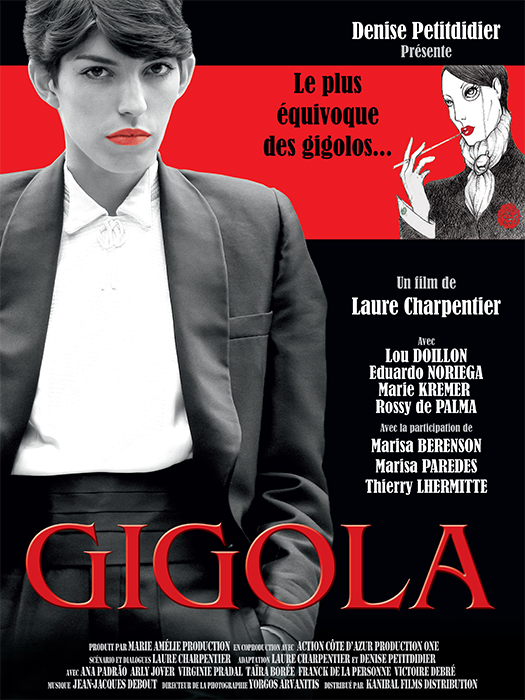
Doillon on the cover of 2010's Gigola

=== Films ===
- Kung-Fu Master (1988) – directed by Agnès Varda
- Trop (peu) d'amour (1998) – directed by Jacques Doillon
- Mauvaises fréquentations (1999) – directed by Jean-Pierre Améris
- Mamirolle (2000) – directed by Brigitte Coscas
- Carrément à l'ouest (2001) – directed by Jacques Doillon
- Embrassez qui vous voudrez (2002) – directed by Michel Blanc
- Blanche (2002) – directed by Bernie Bonvoisin
- Saint Ange (2004) – directed by Pascal Laugier
- La Vida perra de Juanita Narboni (2005) – of Farida Benlyazid
- Sisters (2006) – directed by Douglas Buck
- Go Go Tales (2007) – directed by Abel Ferrara
- Boxes (2007) – directed by Jane Birkin and starring Birkin, Geraldine Chaplin, Michel Piccoli and Natacha Régnier
- Bazar (2009) – directed by Patricia Plattner and starring Bernadette Lafont
- Gigola (2010) – directed by Laure Charpentier
- Naked in London (2011) – directed by Mark Tierney
- Polisse (2011) – directed by Maïwenn
- Un enfant de toi (2012) – directed by Jacques Doillon
- Quasi a Casa (2024) - directed by Carolina Pavone

=== Television ===
- Scénarios sur la drogue (2000) – directed by Guillaume Canet and Jean-Christophe Pagnac (episode "Avalanche")
- Nana (2001) – directed by Édouard Molinaro
- The Private Life of Samuel Pepys (2003) – directed by Oliver Parker
- Gossip Girl (2010) – directed by Mark Piznarski and starring Doillon as herself

== Discography ==
=== Albums ===
Year	Album	Peak positions					Certification
Year	Album	BEL (FL)	BEL (WA)	FRA	CAN	SWI	Certification
2012	Places	101	5	3	7	22	SNEP: Platinum
2015	Lay Low	118	3	3	—	6	SNEP: Gold
2019	Soliloquy	—	18	25	—	12	

=== Singles ===
Year	Album	Peak positions	Album
Year	Album	FRA	Album
2012	"I.C.U"	57	Places
2012	"Defiant"	125	Places
2012	"Devil or Angel"	69	Places
2015	"Where to Start"	40	Lay Low
