= Serge Gainsbourg discography =

The discography of French singer-songwriter Serge Gainsbourg consists of 16 studio albums, 4 live albums, 1 compilation album, 80 singles and EPS, and several soundtrack albums.

== Albums ==
=== Studio albums ===
Year	Album	Chart	Sales	Certifications
Year	Album	FR	Sales	Certifications
1958	Du chant à la une	137		
1959	N° 2	–		
1961	L'Étonnant Serge Gainsbourg	–		
1962	Serge Gainsbourg N° 4	–		
1963	Gainsbourg Confidentiel	–		
1964	Gainsbourg Percussions	–		
1968	Initials B.B.	–		
1969	Jane Birkin/Serge Gainsbourg	4		
1971	Histoire de Melody Nelson	56		
1973	Vu de l'extérieur	–		
1975	Rock around the bunker	5		
1976	L'Homme à tête de chou	85		SNEP: Gold
1979	Aux armes et cætera	1	FRA: 650,000	SNEP: Platinum
1981	Mauvaises nouvelles des étoiles	47		SNEP: Gold
1984	Love on the Beat	3		SNEP: Platinum
1987	You're Under Arrest	2		SNEP: Platinum

=== Live albums ===
- 1980: Enregistrement public au Théâtre Le Palace (re-released in 2006 as Gainsbourg... et cætera – Enregistrement public au Théâtre Le Palace in an expanded edition)
- 1986: Gainsbourg Live (Casino de Paris)
- 1989: Le Zénith de Gainsbourg
- 2001: 1963 Théâtre des Capucines

=== Compilation albums ===
- 1968: Bonnie & Clyde (with Brigitte Bardot)
- 2021: L'Album de sa vie (100 titles) (Peak FR: #19, BEL (Wa): #89)

=== Selected film scores ===
- 1964: How Do You Like My Sister?
- 1967: Anna
- 1968: Le Pacha
- 1969: Slogan
- 1970: Cannabis (instrumental)
- 1970: La Horse
- 1976: Je t'aime moi non plus – Ballade de Johnny-Jane (instrumental)
- 1977: Madame Claude (instrumental)
- 1977: Goodbye Emmanuelle (instrumental)
- 1980: Je vous aime (only three pieces sung by Gainsbourg, including one sung with Catherine Deneuve; one song performed by Gérard Depardieu)
- 1986: Putain de film ! – B.O.F. Tenue de soirée

=== Editions ===
- De Gainsbourg à Gainsbarre (1989, 1994, Philips)

A 207-track survey of Gainsbourg's career from 1959 to 1981 on nine CDs, issued both separately and in a box: Vol. 1 – Le Poinçonneur Des Lilas, 1959-1960; Vol. 2 – La Javanaise, 1961-1963; Vol. 3 – Couleur Café, 1963-1964; Vol. 4 – Initials B.B., 1966-1968; Vol. 5 – Je T'Aime Moi Non Plus, 1969-1971; Vol. 6 – Je Suis Venu Te Dire Que Je M'en Vais, 1973-1975; Vol. 7 – L'Homme à Tête de Chou, 1975-1981; Vol. 8 – Aux Armes et Cætera, 1979-1981; and Vol. 9 – Anna, 1967–1980. A two-CD highlights collection, also called De Gainsbourg à Gainsbarre, was culled from this edition in 1990. The box was reissued in 1994 with two more discs containing the later albums Love on the Beat (1984) and You're Under Arrest (1987).

- Gainsbourg Forever (2001, Mercury)

An 18-CD box issued to mark the tenth anniversary of Gainsbourg's death containing each of his sixteen studio albums and the EP Essais Pour Signature (1958) in its original format (one per CD), plus a disc of rarities, Inédits, Les Archives 1958-1981. A separate 3-CD box, Le Cinéma de Serge Gainsbourg: Musiques de Films 1959–1990 (2001, Mercury) covered his film music.

- Serge Gainsbourg Intégrale (2011, Philips)

A 20-CD, 271-track box issued to mark the twentieth anniversary of Gainsbourg's death. The first sixteen discs contain his studio albums and related tracks. They are followed by a disc of singles, a disc of television and radio recordings, and two discs of film music.

=== Albums written for other artists ===
- 1973: Di doo dah – Jane Birkin
- 1975: Lolita Go Home – Jane Birkin (about half of the album)
- 1977: Rock'n rose – Alain Chamfort
- 1978: Ex fan des sixties – Jane Birkin
- 1980: Guerre et pets – Jacques Dutronc (about two-thirds of the album)
- 1981: Amour année zéro – Alain Chamfort
- 1981: Souviens-toi de m'oublier – Catherine Deneuve
- 1982: Play blessures – Alain Bashung
- 1983: Isabelle Adjani (or Pull marine) – Isabelle Adjani
- 1983: Baby Alone in Babylone – Jane Birkin
- 1986: Charlotte for Ever – Charlotte Gainsbourg
- 1987: Lost Song – Jane Birkin
- 1989: Made in China – Bambou
- 1990: Amours des feintes – Jane Birkin
- 1990: Variations sur le même t'aime – Vanessa Paradis
- Furthermore, several albums by Jane Birkin released after Gainsbourg's death were devoted to Gainsbourg material, including Versions Jane (1996), Arabesque (2002) and Birkin/Gainsbourg : Le Symphonique (2017). Additionally, most Jane Birkin live albums feature almost entirely or entirely Gainsbourg material.

=== Selected tribute albums and posthumous releases ===
- 1995: Intoxicated Man (tribute album by Mick Harvey)
- 1995: Gainsbourgsion! (tribute album by April March)
- 1997: Pink Elephants (tribute album by Mick Harvey)
- 1997: Great Jewish Music: Serge Gainsbourg (tribute album)
- 1997: Comic Strip (collection of songs recorded between 1966 and 1969)
- 2001: I Love Serge: Electronicagainsbourg (remix album)
- 2005: Monsieur Gainsbourg Revisited (tribute album)
- 2008: Classé X (compilation)
- 2008: Gainsbourg Gainbegiratuz (tribute)
- 2011: Best of Gainsbourg: Comme Un Boomerang (compilation)
- 2016: Delirium Tremens (tribute album by Mick Harvey)
- 2017: Intoxicated Women (tribute album by Mick Harvey)
- 2020 Serge Vie Heroique (tribute tape by Serge Nikos)

== Singles and EPs ==
The majority of his EPs (represented in italics) were also released as 7-inch promo jukebox singles.

Year	Single	Peak chart positions							
Year	Single	AUT	BE (WA)	FRA	NL	NOR	SUI	UK	US
1958	Le Poinçonneur des Lilas	–	–	–	–	–	–	–	–
1959	La Jambe de bois (Friedland)	–	–	–	–	–	–	–	–
1959	Le Claqueur de doigts	–	–	–	–	–	–	–	–
1959	L'Anthracite	–	–	–	–	–	–	–	–
1960	L'Eau à la bouche	–	49	–	–	–	–	–	–
1960	Les Loups dans la bergerie	–	–	–	–	–	–	–	–
1960	Romantique 60	–	–	–	–	–	–	–	–
1961	La Chanson de Prévert	–	–	–	–	–	–	–	–
1961	Les Oubliettes	–	–	–	–	–	–	–	–
1962	Les Goémons	–	–	–	–	–	–	–	–
1963	Vilaine fille, mauvais garçon	–	– (Note: "La Javanaise" on the B-side of the EP charted at number 38 in Belgium and when re-released in 2011, charted at number 87 in France)	–	–	–	–	–	–
1963	Strip-tease	–	–	–	–	–	–	–	–
1964	Comment trouvez-vous ma sœur ?	–	–	–	–	–	–	–	–
1964	Chez les yé-yé	–	–	–	–	–	–	–	–
1964	Couleur Café	–	–	–	–	–	–	–	–
1966	Qui est "In", Qui est "Out"	–	47	–	–	–	–	–	–
1967	Vidocq	–	–	–	–	–	–	–	–
1967	Anna	–	–	–	–	–	–	–	–
1967	Toutes folles de lui	–	–	–	–	–	–	–	–
1967	Comic Strip	–	45	–	–	–	–	–	–
1967	L'Horizon	–	–	–	–	–	–	–	–
1968	"Bonnie and Clyde" (with Brigitte Bardot) (Note: Also released as an EP)	–	18	–	–	–	–	–	–
1968	"Manon 70"	–	–	–	–	–	–	–	–
1968	"Requiem pour un con"	–	–	49 (Note: Chart position in 2010)	–	–	–	–	–
1968	"Ce sacré grand-père"	–	–	–	–	–	–	–	–
1968	"Initials B.B."	–	42	93 (Note: Chart position in 2011)	–	–	–	–	–
1968	Mister Freedom	–	–	80 (Note: Chart position in 2009)	–	–	–	–	–
1968	"L'anamour"	–	–	–	–	–	–	–	–
1969	"Élisa"	–	–	–	–	–	–	–	–
1969	"Je t'aime... moi non plus" (with Jane Birkin)	1	2	3	2	1	1	1	58
1969	"La Chanson de Slogan" (with Jane Birkin)	–	–	–	–	–	–	–	–
1969	"La Horse"	–	–	94	–	–	–	–	–
1970	"Un petit garçon appelé Charlie Brown"	–	–	–	–	–	–	–	–
1970	"Cannabis"	–	–	–	–	–	–	–	–
1971	"Ballade de Melody Nelson"	–	–	29	–	–	–	–	–
1972	"La Décadanse" (with Jane Birkin)	–	13	47	–	–	–	–	–
1972	"Sex-Shop"	–	–	–	–	–	–	–	–
1972	"Moogy-Woogy"	–	–	–	–	–	–	–	–
1973	"Je suis venu te dire que je m'en vais"	–	35	73	–	–	–	–	–
1974	"Je t'aime... moi non plus" (re-release)	–	–	–	4	–	–	31	–
1975	"Rock Around the Bunker"	–	47	–	–	–	–	–	–
1975	"L'Ami Caouette"	–	31	–	–	–	–	–	–
1976	"Marilou sous la neige"	–	50	–	–	–	–	–	–
1976	"Ballade de Johnny-Jane"	–	–	–	–	–	–	–	–
1977	"Madame Claude"	–	–	–	–	–	–	–	–
1977	"My Lady Héroïne"	–	47	–	–	–	–	–	–
1977	"Good Bye Emmanuelle"	–	–	–	–	–	–	–	–
1977	"Chanson du chevalier blanc"	–	–	–	–	–	–	–	–
1978	"Sea, Sex and Sun"	–	–	–	–	–	–	–	–
1979	"Des laids, des laids" / "Aux armes et cætera"	–	–	–	–	–	–	–	–
1979	"Vieille Canaille"	–	–	–	–	–	–	–	–
1980	"Harley Davidson"	–	–	–	–	–	–	–	–
1980	"Requiem pour un twister"	–	–	–	–	–	–	–	–
1980	"Dieu fumeur de Havanes" (with Catherine Deneuve)	–	–	8	–	–	–	–	–
1981	"Souviens-toi de m'oublier" (with Catherine Deneuve)	–	–	–	–	–	–	–	–
1981	"Le Physique et le figuré"	–	–	–	–	–	–	–	–
1981	"Ecce Homo"	–	–	–	–	–	–	–	–
1982	"Bana Basadi Balalo"	–	–	–	–	–	–	–	–
1984	"Love on the Beat"	–	–	–	–	–	–	–	–
1985	"Lemon Incest" (with Charlotte Gainsbourg)	–	–	2	–	–	–	–	–
1985	"No Comment"	–	–	–	–	–	–	–	–
1986	"Vieille Canaille" (with Eddy Mitchell)	–	–	17	–	–	–	–	–
1986	"Je t'aime... moi non plus" (with Brigitte Bardot)	–	–	–	–	–	–	–	–
1986	"Charlotte Forever" (with Charlotte Gainsbourg)	–	–	–	–	–	–	–	–
1987	"You're Under Arrest"	–	–	47	–	–	–	–	–
1988	"Aux enfants de la chance"	–	–	35	–	–	–	–	–
1988	"Mon Légionnaire"	–	–	–	–	–	–	–	–
1989	"Hey Man Amen" (Live)	–	–	–	–	–	–	–	–
1989	"Couleur Café" (Live)	–	–	–	–	–	–	–	–
1990	"Stan the Flasher"	–	–	–	–	–	–	–	–
1991	"Requiem Pour un Con" (Remix 91)	–	–	8	–	–	–	–	–
1995	"Élisa" (re-release)	–	–	36	–	–	–	–	–
2000	"Je t'aime" (The Mixes)	–	–	–	–	–	–	–	–
2003	"Lola Rastaquouère"	–	–	–	–	–	–	–	–
2003	Marilou Reggae	–	–	–	–	–	–	–	–
2003	"Aux Armes!" (featuring Big Youth)	–	–	–	–	–	–	–	–
2010	"Les Cœurs Verts"	–	–	–	–	–	–	–	–
2010	Le Jardinier d'Argenteuil	–	–	–	–	–	–	–	–
2010	Si j'étais un espion	–	–	–	–	–	–	–	–
2011	"Comme un boomerang"	–	– (Note: "Comme un boomerang" did not chart on the Ultratop 50, but did reach #11 on the Ultratip chart)	40	–	–	–	–	–
2017	"Équateur"	–	–	–	–	–	–	–	–
2020	À la Maison de la Radio	–	–	–	–	–	–	–	–

=== Singles written for other artists ===
- "Laisse tomber les filles" (1964) – France Gall
- "N’écoute pas les idoles" (1964) – France Gall
- "Les Incorruptibles" (1965) – Petula Clark
- "La Gadoue" (1965) – Petula Clark
- "Poupée de cire, poupée de son" (1965) – France Gall
- "Attends ou va-t'en" (1965) – France Gall
- "Nous ne sommes pas des anges" (1965) – France Gall
- "Baby Pop" (1966) – France Gall
- "Les Sucettes" (1966) – France Gall
- "Les Papillons Noirs" (1966) – Michèle Arnaud
- "Harley Davidson" – Brigitte Bardot
- "Teenie Weenie Boppie" (1967) – France Gall
- "Ne dis rien" (1967) – Anna Karina
- "Comment te dire adieu?" (1968) – Françoise Hardy (lyrics)
- "Betty Jane Rose" (1978) – Bijou
- "Joujou à la casse" (1979) – Alain Chamfort
- "Manureva" (1979) – Alain Chamfort
- "Amour Puissance Six" (1989) – Viktor Lazlo
- "Dis-lui toi que je t'aime" (1990) – Vanessa Paradis
- "White and Black Blues" (1990) – Joëlle Ursull (lyrics by Gainsbourg)
