= Enregistrement public au Théâtre Le Palace =

Live album by Serge Gainsbourg
- Released: 1980
- Recorded: December 28, 1979
- Venue: Théâtre Le Palace, 8 rue du Faubourg, Montmartre, Paris 9è, France
- Genre: Reggae, dub poetry, chanson
- Language: French
- Label: Universal
- Producer: Bruno Blum

Serge Gainsbourg chronology
Aux armes et cætera (1979)	Enregistrement public au Théâtre Le Palace (1980)	Mauvaises nouvelles des étoiles (1981)

Alternative cover
- Cover art of 1987 CD reissue.

Alternative cover
- Cover art of complete 2006 reissue.

Enregistrement public au Théâtre Le Palace, also known as Gainsbourg…et Caetera, is the first live album by Serge Gainsbourg, released in 1980. It was reissued in 1987 on CD, but with half the tracks removed. In 2006, a new release titled Gainsbourg... et cætera - Enregistrement public au Théâtre Le Palace featured the complete concert for the first time. The album exhibits his then reggae-influenced style.

Pitchfork noted about it in its review, "The album is less about Gainsbourg’s insouciance than Collins’ spectral keyboards and Sticky Thompson’s meticulous percussion."

== Track listing ==
All tracks composed by Serge Gainsbourg; except where noted.

=== Original album ===
==== A-Side ====
1. "Drifter" (Dennis Walks, Harry Mudie) - 3:45
2. "Relax Baby Be Cool" - 3:52
3. "Marilou Reggae Dub" - 5:02
4. "Daisy Temple" - 4:34

==== B-Side ====
1. "Brigade des Stups" - 4:04
2. "Elle est si" (Jacques Dutronc, Gainsbourg) - 1:15
3. "Aux armes et cætera" (lyrics: Rouget de Lisle; music: Gainsbourg) - 3:51
4. "Pas long feu" - 4:06
5. "Les Locataires" - 4:26

==== C-Side ====
1. "Docteur Jekyll et Monsieur Hyde" - 3:38
2. "Harley Davidson" - 4:57
3. "Javanaise Remake" - 4:20
4. "Des laids des laids" - 3:48
5. "Vieille canaille (You Rascal You)" (lyrics: Jacques Plante; music: Sam Theard) - 3:17

==== D-Side ====
1. "Présentation des musiciens" - 2:00
2. "Bonnie and Clyde" - 4:32
3. "Lola rastaquouère" - 4:16
4. "Aux armes et cætera" - 4:20

=== CD re-release ===
1. "Vieille canaille" - 3:46
2. "Bonnie and Clyde" - 4:41
3. "Docteur Jekyll et Monsieur Hyde" - 3:34
4. "Aux armes et cætera" - 4:33
5. "Brigade des Stups" - 4:17
6. "Harley Davidson" - 5:08
7. "Lola rastaquouère" - 4:24
8. "Javanaise Remake" - 4:23
9. "Des laids des laids" - 3:54
10. "Pas long feu" - 5:03

=== 2006 version ===
==== Disc 1 ====
1. "Ouverture"
2. "Drifter"
3. "Relax Baby Be Cool"
4. "Marilou Reggae Dub"
5. "Daisy Temple"
6. "Brigade des Stups"
7. "Elle est si"
8. "Aux armes et cætera"
9. "Pas long feu"
10. "J'aime bien les noirs" (interview)

==== Disc 2 ====
1. "Docteur Jekyll et Monsieur Hyde"
2. "Harley Davidson"
3. "Javanaise Remake"
4. "Des laids des laids"
5. "Les Locataires"
6. "Présentation des musiciens"
7. "Bonnie and Clyde"
8. "Vieille canaille"
9. "Relax Baby Be Cool" (Instrumental)
10. "Lola rastaquouère"
11. "Bis"
12. "Lola rastaquouère" (Previously Unreleased)
13. "Aux armes et cætera" (Previously Unreleased)
14. "Final"
15. "La Marseillaise" (interview)

== Personnel ==
- Serge Gainsbourg - vocals
- Robbie Shakespeare - bass
- Lowell "Sly" Dunbar - drums
- Kay Williams, Michelle Jackson, Candy McKenzie - chorus
- Michael "Mao" Chung - guitar
- Radcliffe "Dougie" Bryan - rhythm guitar
- Ansel Collins - keyboards
- Uziah "Sticky" Thompson - percussion

Technical

- Paul Scemama - recording
- Geoffrey Chung - mixing
- Jacques Aubert - front cover photography
