= Great Jewish Music: Serge Gainsbourg =

Compilation album by Various Artists
- Released: 1997
- Genre: Avant-garde, pop, rock, electronic
- Length: 76:38
- Label: Tzadik
- Producer: John Zorn

Professional ratings
Review scores
Source	Rating
Allmusic	link

Great Jewish Music: Serge Gainsbourg is a tribute album featuring the music of French singer/songwriter Serge Gainsbourg. Executive-produced by John Zorn, it was released on Tzadik Records in 1997 as part of their series on "Radical Jewish Culture".

== Track listing ==
1. "Les Amours Perdues" – Elysian Fields – 3:28
2. "Ford Mustang" – Mike Patton – 2:40
3. "Bonnie and Clyde" – Wayne Horvitz and Robin Holcomb – 5:08
4. "La-Bas C'est Naturel" – Cyro Baptista – 5:30
5. "69 Année Erotique" – Kramer – 4:16
6. "Pauvre Lola" – Ikue Mori – 2:49
7. "Ballade de Melody Nelson" – Fred Frith – 2:04
8. "Les sucettes" – JON – 2:44
9. "L'Homme A La Tête De Chou" – Ruins – 3:18
10. "Ce Mortel Ennui" – Anthony Coleman – 4:10
11. "Un Poison Violent, C'est Ca L'Amour" – Eszter Balint – 5:05
12. "Initials B.B." – David Shea – 3:48
13. "Sous Le Soleil Exactement" – Eyvind Kang – 3:44
14. "Couleur Café" – Steve Beresford – 3:07
15. "Le Chanson De Slogan" – Blonde Redhead – 3:46
16. "Contact" – John Zorn – 2:20
17. "Je t'aime... moi non plus" – Cibo Matto – 4:20
18. "Intoxicated Man" – Medeski Martin & Wood – 3:31
19. "Comic Strip" – Shelley Hirsch – 1:58
20. "Requiem Pour Un Con" – Franz Treichler – 4:59
21. "Black Trombone" – Marc Ribot – 3:45

== Personnel ==
"Les Amours Perdues"

- Oren Bloedow – Guitar, bass, drums
- Ed Pastorini – Keyboards
- Jamie Candiloro – Mixing
- Jennifer Charles – Vocals

"Ford Mustang"

- Mike Johnson – Engineering
- Mike Patton – Vocals, Music

"Bonnie And Clyde"

- Wayne Horvitz – Music
- Tucker Martine – Mixing
- Reggie Watts – Vocals
- Robin Holcomb – Vocals

"La-Bas C'est Naturel"

- Cyro Baptista – Percussion
- Olivier Glissant – Vocals, Accordion

"69 Année Erotique"

- Tess – Backing vocals
- Kramer – Vocals, music

"Pauvre Lola"

- Ikue Mori – Drum programming
- Mark Roule – Engineering
- Marc Ribot – Guitar
- Haena Kim – Vocals

"The Ballad Of Melody Nelson"

- Fred Frith – Vocals, music

"Les Sucettes"

- JON – Vocals, Harmonium

"L'Homme A La Tête De Chou"

- Sasaki Hisashi – Bass
- Tatsuya Yoshida – Vocals, drums

"Ce Mortel Ennui"

- Yael Bitton – Backing vocals
- Doug Wieselman – Clarinet
- Joe Johnson – Engineering
- Michael Attias – Baritone saxophone
- Anthony Coleman – Vocals, piano

"Un Poison Violent, C'est Ca L'Amour"

- Roberto Rodríguez – Drums
- Eddie Sperry – Engineering
- Marc Ribot – Guitar, backing vocals
- JD Foster – Producer, bass, organ
- Eszter Balint – Vocals

"Initials B.B."

- Kurt Ralske – Engineering
- David Shea – Music
- Tiziana Shea – Vocals

"Sous Le Soleil Exactement"

- Eyvind Kang – Music
- Michelle Amar – Vocals

"Couleur Café"

- Steve Beresford – Vocals, Music

"Le Chanson De Slogan"

- Simone Pace – Drums
- Guy Picciotto – Engineering
- Amadeo Pace – Guitar
- Kazu Makino – Vocals

"Contact"

- John Zorn – Vocals

"Je T'Aime, Moi Non Plus"

- Sean Lennon – Bass, guitar, vocals
- Timo Ellis – Drums, vocals
- Yuka Honda – Keyboards
- Miho Hatori – Vocals

"Intoxicated Man"

- Chris Wood – Bass
- Billy Martin – Drums
- John Medeski – Organ, vocals

"Comic Strip"

- Shelley Hirsch – Vocals

"Requiem Pour Un Con"

- Tronte – Music, vocals
- Franz Treichler – Music, vocals

"Black Trombone"

- Eddie Sperry – Engineering
- Marc Ribot – Guitar, vocals

== Credits ==
- Ikue Mori – Artwork
- Serge Gainsbourg – Music
- John Zorn – Producer
- Allan Tucker – Mastering

== Sources ==
- tzadik.com
- discogs.com
