= Comic strip (disambiguation) =

A comic strip is a sequence of drawings that tells a story.

Comic strip may also refer to:

- "Comic Strip" (song), a 1968 song by Serge Gainsbourg and Madeline Bell
- The Comic Strip, a group of British comedians
  - The Comic Strip Presents, usually referred to as just The Comic Strip, a television show featuring the eponymous group of British comedians
- The Comic Strip (TV series), a 1987–1988 American animated series
- Comic Strip Live, a comedy showcase club in New York City
