= Gainsbourg Live =

Live album by Serge Gainsbourg
- Released: 1986
- Recorded: 3–5 October 1985
- Venue: Casino de Paris, Paris, France
- Genre: New wave, chanson
- Language: French
- Label: Philips Records
- Producer: Philippe Lerichomme

Serge Gainsbourg chronology
Love on the Beat (1984)	Gainsbourg Live (1986)	You're Under Arrest (1987)

Gainsbourg Live is the second live album by Serge Gainsbourg, released in 1986, featuring an autumn 1985 concert at the Casino de Paris.

== Track listing ==
1. "Love on the Beat" - 9:57
2. "Initials B.B." - 3:00
3. "Harley Davidson" - 2:46
4. "Sorry Angel" - 4:36
5. "Nazi Rock" - 4:31
6. "Ballade de Johnny Jane" - 2:55
7. "Bonnie and Clyde" - 5:00
8. "Vieille canaille" - 2:55
9. "I'm the Boy" - 6:21
10. "Dépression au-dessus du jardin" - 2:22
11. "Lemon Incest (abstract)" - 1:14
12. "Mickey maousse" - 1:07
13. "My Lady Héroïne" - 3:09
14. "Je suis venu te dire que je m'en vais" - 3:21
15. "L'Eau à la bouche" - 3:03
16. "Lola rastaquouère" - 3:28
17. "Marilou sous la neige" - 3:11
18. "Harley David Son of a Bitch" - 5:33
19. "La Javanaise" - 2:50
20. "Love on the Beat" (Encore) (Bonus track on LP and cassette versions)

== Personnel ==
- Serge Gainsbourg - vocals
- Billy Rush - guitar, conductor of orchestra
- John K (John Kumnick) - bass
- Gary Georgett - keyboards
- Tony "Thunder" Smith - drums
- Stan Harrison - saxophone
- George Simms, Steve Simms - backing vocals
