= Aux armes et cætera (album) =

Aux Armes et Cætera

Studio album by Serge Gainsbourg
- Released: 13 March 1979
- Recorded: January 12–24, 1979
- Studio: Dynamic Sounds Studio, Kingston, Jamaica
- Genre: Reggae, dub poetry
- Length: 32:55
- Language: French
- Label: Universal
- Producer: Philippe Lerichomme

Serge Gainsbourg chronology
L'Homme à tête de chou (1976)	Aux Armes et Cætera (1979)	Enregistrement public au Théâtre Le Palace (1980)

Alternative cover
- Cover of Collector's Edition

Aux Armes et cætera is the thirteenth studio album by Serge Gainsbourg, released in the early spring of 1979. It was recorded in Kingston, Jamaica, with some of the island's best reggae musicians at the time as well as members of the I Threes, Bob Marley's backup chorus which includes Rita Marley. Further expanded by new mixes, dubs and Jamaican versions released in 2003 and 2015, the album is considered by many as one of his masterpieces. The French edition of Rolling Stone magazine named this album the 50th greatest French rock album (out of 100). The recording marked the first time a white singer had recorded a full reggae-influenced album in Jamaica, following previous single-song recordings from Paul Simon ("Mother and Child Reunion", 1972) and Peter Tosh and Mick Jagger ("(You Gotta Walk And) Don't Look Back", 1978). By 1991, it sold 650,000 copies in France.

== Reception ==
With the exception of his 1969 international hit duet with Jane Birkin "Je t'aime... moi non plus" (where Birkin's erotic voice had turned the song into a novelty success), Serge Gainsbourg was then only a cult figure having mainly met success through versions of his songs recorded by other artists, including Brigitte Bardot, Juliette Gréco, Honor Blackman, Jane Birkin, France Gall, and Petula Clark. The album sold over one million copies in 1979, turning him into a major sensation in France, Belgium and French-speaking Switzerland.

Aux armes et cætera is one of the first appearances of reggae in French music, though Gainsbourg's own "Marilou Reggae" came earlier; it was included on his 1976 album, L'Homme à tête de chou, which had been recorded in London with non-reggae musicians. "Marilou Reggae" is also included in Aux armes et cætera, in a different arrangement with an extra verse, and renamed to "Marilou Reggae Dub".

The title track is a reggae adaptation of "La Marseillaise", the French national anthem. Soon after the song's first appearance on television on April 1, 1979 (a controversial appearance followed as the recording was perceived by some as an insult to the French Republic), it became a big success. Gainsbourg received death threats upon release of his cover of the French national anthem. One journalist, Michel Droit of Le Figaro, criticized the song, writing that Gainsbourg was feeding antisemitism by "trying to make money with the national anthem". Deeply hurt, in turn the singer published a striking reply. Other critics did not like that the original text was truncated, half of the chorus line (including the most military-oriented section of the song) being edited out.

In 1981, Gainsbourg purchased the original manuscript of "La Marseillaise" at an auction, which was signed by the composer, Claude Joseph Rouget de Lisle. He then showed critics that his version was, in fact, closer to the original than any other recorded version as the manuscript clearly shows the words "Aux armes et cætera..." for the chorus as Rouget de Lisle did not bother writing the full chorus each time, preferring to shorten it with the word etc.

Two other singles were taken from the album: "Vieille canaille" (a French version of "You Rascal You" written in the 1920s by Sam Theard) and Gainsbourg's own "Lola Rastaquouère". A short European tour featuring the Jamaican group The Revolutionaries (see line-up below) but not the I-Three followed in December 1979, culminating in a series of shows in Paris. At a show in Strasbourg, outraged paratroopers showed up in the concert hall and the show was cancelled. Serge Gainsbourg nevertheless came onstage on his own and courageously sang the regular national anthem, stating that he gave "La Marseillaise its original revolutionary meaning back". The soldiers then sang along with him in a military salute posture. The event was shown on TV news, causing more controversy and sarcasm — and boosting album sales. The Paris shows at Le Palace were recorded by Philippe Lerichomme, mixed by Bruno Blum and engineer Thierry Bertomeu and issued as a double CD, Gainsbourg et cætera in 2006.

With the same musicians and backing vocalists, Serge Gainsbourg recorded a reggae follow-up studio album in 1981, Mauvaises nouvelles des étoiles. In 2003 that album was also given the "dub style" treatment (see "new mixes" below) by Bruno Blum and Soljie Hamilton.

== New mixes ==
In 2003, Aux Armes et Cætera was re-released in a Bruno Blum–produced deluxe double-CD version including new "dub style" mixes of the vocal tracks, including some previously unreleased recordings. Disc 2 features dub versions of most tracks and Jamaican artists' versions/adaptations of all songs. An English rendition of "Lola Rastaquouère" sung by producer Bruno Blum is also included on the album, as well as a newly recorded version of "Marilou Reggae" (using the "L'Homme à Tête de Chou" vocal) featuring drummer Leroy "Horsemouth" Wallace, bass player Flabba Holt and Blum on guitar. Jamaican versions include Lone Ranger, Big Youth, Buffalo Bill, Lisa Dainjah, King Stitt and Brady. All tracks were mixed by veteran Jamaican sound engineer Soljie Hamilton. Serge Gainsbourg's other two reggae albums were also newly mixed by producer Bruno Blum with engineers Soljie Hamilton and Thierry Bertomeu.

Both Aux Armes et Cætera and Mauvaises Nouvelles des Étoiles were also released on vinyl in 2003 (two albums named Versions Serge), as well as their dubs (two albums named Versions Dub), and Jamaican vocalists versions (two albums named Versions DJ). In addition, a four-track 10" vinyl record featuring four mixes of the newly recorded version of "Marilou Reggae" was issued. Two limited-edition vinyl singles were also pressed in Jamaica: "Aux Armes Et Cætera" plus a dub titled "version" that is not available anywhere else, as well as Big Youth's "Aux Armes!" plus dub.

== Serge Gainsbourg & the Revolutionaries ==
In June 2015, Aux armes et cætera as well as both other Serge Gainsbourg reggae albums (Mauvaises nouvelles des étoiles and a live album), all featuring The Revolutionaries with Sly & Robbie, were reissued by the Mercury label in a Bruno Blum–produced, triple CD, "Super DeLuxe", 10" book set. The book text was written by Bruno Blum and features original producer Philippe Lerichomme photographs. Called Serge Gainsbourg & the Revolutionaries, it includes several previously unreleased mixes and versions, such as "Javanaise Remake" with the 1964 original version-styled "sham-dam sham-dam" backing vocals added in 2002. Other previously unreleased versions include "Brigade des Stups", as well as alternate vocal takes of "Marilou Reggae Dub", "Vieille Canaille" (Sam Theard's "You Rascal You") and an incomplete "Lola Rastaquouère". Previously unreleased recordings from the other two albums are also included, making this set the definitive, complete Gainsbourg reggae sessions set.

== Gainsbourg in Dub ==
In June 2015, at the same time as Serge Gainsbourg & the Revolutionaries, 54 fine dubs (all but one were previously unreleased and cannot be found on the 2003 sets) were issued by the Mercury label in a Bruno Blum–produced, triple CD, "Super DeLuxe", 10" book set named Gainsbourg in Dub. All dubs were mixed in Jamaica by Blum and Jamaican dub master Soljie Hamilton, except for seventeen tracks taken from the live album, all of which were mixed by Blum and Marcadet Studio engineer Bryan Pachaud in France. The book text was written by Bruno Blum and features his photographs as well as original producer Philippe Lerichomme's. Nineteen of them are dub mixes of Aux armes et cætera songs.

A dub named "Je ne dub plus, moi aussi" revealed the existence of an Aux armes et cætera album outtake, but only snippets of Gainsbourg's vocals can be heard on it, as well as a chorus sung by Juliette Tourret. Named "Je ne t'aime plus, moi aussi", the full vocal version of this song has not yet surfaced. Apparently the song was refused by the Gainsbourg estate because of X-rated lyrics, creating a bit of an intrigue as unheard Gainsbourg musical creations are very much sought after by fans — especially when controversial. According to French journalist and Gainsbourg friend Gérard Bar-David (his wife was the singer's press agent for years), who recorded Gainsbourg's vocals months after the music track was recorded, the vocals were added to the music by Bruno Blum on the Sly & Robbie backing track because they fitted the unfinished song title like a glove. The vocals were actually taken from a Gainsbourg-directed video creation featuring an unrestrained Gainsbourg talking about women and filmed by Bar-David's team. The video has not surfaced either.

== Track listing ==
All tracks are written by Serge Gainsbourg, except where noted.

Original edition
No.	Title	Writer(s)	Length
1.	"Javanaise Remake"		3:05
2.	"Aux armes et cætera"	Serge Gainsbourg (music), Claude Joseph Rouget de Lisle (lyrics)	3:05
3.	"Les Locataires"		2:09
4.	"Des laids des laids"		2:36
5.	"Brigade Des Stups"		1:57
6.	"Vieille Canaille (You Rascal You)"	Sam Theard (music), Jacques Plante (lyrics)	3:02
7.	"Lola Rastaquouère"		3:40
8.	"Relax Baby Be Cool"		2:30
9.	"Daisy Temple"		3:53
10.	"Eau et gaz à tous les étages"		0:37
11.	"Pas long feu"		2:33
12.	"Marilou Reggae Dub"		3:48

== Personnel ==
Credits adapted from liner notes.

Musicians

- Serge Gainsbourg – vocals, arrangement
- The I Threes (Marcia Griffiths, Rita Marley, Judy Mowatt) – backing vocals
- Robbie Shakespeare – bass, arrangement
- Sly Dunbar – drums, arrangement
- Michael "Mao" Chung – guitar, acoustic piano
- Radcliffe "Dougie" Bryan – rhythm guitar
- Ansel Collins – Hammond organ
- Uziah "Sticky" Thompson – percussion
- Robbie "Tights" Lyn – Fender piano

Technical

- Geoffrey Chung – engineer
- Philip Ziadie – assistant engineer
- Lord Snowdon – cover photography

"Special thanks to: Chris Blackwell • Denise Mills • Tom Hayes • Diane Ellis"

== Charts ==
Chart	Peak position
French Albums (SNEP)	29
