= Roger Steffens =

American actor, author, lecturer, editor, reggae archivist, photographer, producer

- Born: June 17, 1942 (age 84); New York, New York, United States
- Known for: Author, actor, archivist, radio personality

Roger Steffens (born June 17, 1942) is an American actor, author, lecturer, editor, reggae archivist, photographer, and producer. Seven rooms of his home in Los Angeles house reggae archives, which include the world's largest collection of Bob Marley material. Based on these archives Steffens lectures internationally with a multi-media presentation called The Life of Bob Marley, at venues like the Smithsonian, the Library of Congress and the Rock and Roll Hall of Fame. His radio career began in New York City in 1961, and he co-hosted Reggae Beat on KCRW in Los Angeles and was syndicated on 130 stations worldwide in the 1980s.

== Early life and education ==
Steffens was born in Brooklyn, New York and raised in Westwood, New Jersey. He graduated in 1960 from Bergen Catholic High School, where he had competed in public speaking competition. He was the New Jersey State Oratory Champion in the American Legion National Oratory Contest and won a scholarship to Rutgers. He took a Drama Scholarship to Iona College, and also studied acting at Carnegie Tech and the American Academy of Dramatic Arts. He was the honor graduate of the National Defense Information School after being drafted in 1967.

== Music industry employment ==
Steffens was National Promotions Director at Island Records in 1982/83, in charge of all reggae and African music promotions including Bob Marley Confrontation, King Sunny Ade Juju Music and Synchro System, Gregory Isaacs Night Nurse, Black Uhuru, and Michael Smith.

He worked in National Reggae Promotions at Elektra Records in 1982, for Steel Pulse's True Democracy and Sunsplash '81: Tribute to Bob Marley. He worked in National Reggae Promotions at EMI-America in 1985/86, for the first two Ziggy Marley and the Melody Makers albums. He worked in National Reggae Promotions at Slash Records in 1986, for Burning Spear's People of the World.

== Photography ==
Steffens served in Vietnam and spent a year in Morocco before visiting Jamaica for the first time in 1976. He has a large collection of photographs covering his Vietnam service and Jamaican musicians, including many slides which were digitized and released via Instagram in 2013, on a site called "thefamilyacid."

In early 2015 he published his first collection of photographs, The Family Acid. "The Family Acid presents his often transcendent vision and life as a psychedelic pioneer on the order of Timothy Leary and Hunter S. Thompson beginning with his work in Vietnam and moving through his ever revolving circle of friends and characters made up of Rastas, beatniks, musicians, artists, gonzo journalists, his family, and himself. The portraits, scenes, and freewheeling experimentation with the medium of photography coalesce into a body of work that both parallels and defines the countercultural ethos of Steffens' generation."

== Acting and narrating ==
Steffens has been involved with a large amount of acting and narration work, both credited and uncredited. He provided narration in The Flight of the Gossamer Condor and the television documentary Dear America: Letters Home from Vietnam, and he portrayed Ben Veelchez in Dean Quixote, Daniel Golan in the 1999 film Deterrence, and a radio technician in Rollercoaster. In addition, Steffens has been involved with many other films and television shows in an uncredited role, including Forrest Gump, Ghosts of Mississippi, CHiPS, Fernwood Tonight and Empty Nest.

== Radio ==
Steffens co-hosted Reggae Beat on KCRW from 1979 to 1987, and Reggae Beat International from 1983 to 1987, which was syndicated internationally to 130 stations.

He served as a syndicated weekly contributor from 1993 to 1997 for Planet Reggae on the radio station Groove Radio 103 in Los Angeles. Steffens also worked on several other radio shows, including Offbeat: The Roger Steffens Show (Host, 1987–89), Sound of the Sixties (Host, 1984–1986), Morning Goes Makossa (co-host, 1980–84), Future Forward (ethnic music commentator, 1985–86), and Poetry For People Who Hate Poetry (1983, 1987).

Steffens was named "Most Popular Reggae DJ in the World" by Martin's International Awards in Chicago, 1985, and "One of the Forty Who Matter in L.A." by the Los Angeles Reader.

== Music anthologies ==
Steffens has contributed to many music anthologies as a writer and photographer. With his French partner Bruno Blum he produced the ten-CD series The Complete Bob Marley & the Wailers 1967 to 1972. Released between 1998 and 2003, this 220-track series included over a hundred rare Bob Marley & the Wailers recordings, including Selassie Is the Chapel, and many of them previously unreleased, such as Rock to the Rock. He also produced several reissues of Coxsone Dodd-produced early Bob Marley recordings for Heartbeat Records.

== Audio books ==
Steffens was a reader for the audiobooks Bill Gates' Business @ the Speed of Thought (Time Warner) for which he was nominated for an Audie award, The Man From St. Petersburg (Warner Audio), Big Two Hearted River: The Short Stories of Ernest Hemingway (North Star), and Mother Earth Father Sky (North Star). He won an Audie for his work on "Battlefield Earth," and also provided the corporate voice (all wrap-arounds) for Time Warner Audio Books from 1996 until 2003.

== Stage ==
Steffens' stage experience includes work with the Pittsburgh Playhouse, Milwaukee Repertory Theater, Berkeley Repertory Theatre, and his one-man show, Poetry for People Who Hate Poetry, which was performed to more than two million people from 1966 to 1976, and was used as the basis of the 1968/69 TV series Armed Forces Vietnam Network.

== Interviewee, advisor or content provider ==
Steffens has been interviewed and served as an advisor on many television programs, including American Masters three times (on the subjects of Rebel Music, James Brown, and Waldo Salt), VH1's Behind the Music four times (for the subjects Bob Marley, Peter Tosh, Alan Freed, and 1970), VH1 Confidential: Tosh & Marley, VH1 Ultimate Albums: Bob Marely's Legend, Stand And Be Counted, The Voice on Channel Four, and Soul Britainia on the BBC.

== Publications ==
=== Author or coauthor ===
- Bob Marley: Spirit Dancer
- Bob Marley and The Wailers: The Definitive Discography (first place award for Best Research in Folk, Ethnic or World Music from the Association of Recorded Sound Collections, 2006)
- The World of Reggae featuring Bob Marley: Treasures from Roger Steffens' Reggae Archives (2001)
- One Love: Life with Bob Marley and the Wailers (2003)
- Roger Steffens and Peter Simon's Reggae Scrapbook (winner, ForeWord Magazine Silver Medal for Best Music Book of 2007)
- Bob Marley and the Golden Age of Reggae
- So Much Things to Say: The Oral History of Bob Marley (2017)
- Soul Revolution: Bob Marley and the Wailers, 1967-1972 (2024)

=== Contributing writer ===
- A Magio do Reggae, São Paulo: Martin Claret, 1997
- "Bob Marley: Rasta Warrior" in Chanting Down Babylon: The Rastafari Reader, Temple University Press, 1998
- Dictionnaire des chansons de Bob Marley, Paris: Tournon, 2005
- "Reggae in the Seventies" in Rolling Stone's The Seventies
- Introduction to Bob Marley Reader (DaCapo, 2004);
- "Nine Meditations on Jimi and Nam" in The Ultimate Hendrix, NYC: Macmillan
- Bob Marley: The Complete Annotated Bibliography with Joe Jurgensen, Haras, Prospect, 2009
- and dozens more in several languages

=== Photography ===
- The Family Acid. 2015. ISBN 978-0984978175.
- "The Family Acid Jamaica" "
- The Family Acid California."

=== Contributing photographer ===
- Jamaica, Lonely Planet Guide Book, 2000
- Couleur Reggae, Paris: Tana, 2001
- Sur la Route avec Bob Marley, Mark Miller, Scali, France, 2007
- and scores more

== Recordings ==
- Miriam Makeba: The Sangoma Interview with Roger Steffens, Warner
- World Music Sampler writer/narrator, Warner/Reprise/Sire
- David Byrne: Rei Momo: Words and Music, interviewer, Sire
- Occupy Los Angeles: Narration & Continuity, Reel Intellect/Good Feel
