= You're Under Arrest (Serge Gainsbourg album) =

Studio album by Serge Gainsbourg
- Released: November 2, 1987
- Recorded: 1987
- Studio: Dangerous Music, New Jersey; vocals - Studio Digital Service, Paris
- Genre: New wave; funk
- Length: 38:49
- Language: French, English
- Label: Philips
- Producer: Billy Rush; Philippe Lerichomme

Serge Gainsbourg chronology
Gainsbourg Live (1986)	You're Under Arrest (1987)	Le Zénith de Gainsbourg (1989)

You're Under Arrest is the sixteenth and final studio album by French singer-songwriter Serge Gainsbourg. The album was released in 1987 through Philips Records. It was produced by Philippe Lerichomme and the American guitarist Billy Rush, who collaborated with Gainsbourg on his previous album, Love on the Beat (1984).

Retaining the new wave influences found on Love on the Beat, the album consists of "funk tunes" and introduces hip hop elements to Gainsbourg's music, inspired by acts such as Chic and Grandmaster Flash and the Furious Five. The album also features a cover version of "Gloomy Sunday", a song composed by Hungarian pianist Rezső Seress, and "Mon légionnaire", a French song popularized by Édith Piaf.

== Music and lyrics ==
The album is a concept album, which describes the story of an unnamed narrator with a very young drug-addicted girl called Samantha. The story is set in New York, and starts with the narrator getting arrested while looking for Samantha in the Bronx, where she is looking for a dealer; he then describes various aspects of their relationship. "Gloomy Sunday" illustrates the state of gloom caused to the narrator by Samantha's drug-induced absences; "Aux enfants de la chance" (whose title comes from the name of a bar in which Gainsbourg's father used to sing) advises young people not to touch drugs. From this point on the relationship degrades, and in "Dispatch Box" the narrator leaves Samantha whose fate is left unknown. As for the narrator, he joins the French Foreign Legion out of despair, but the story ends on an uplifting note as he falls in love with a fellow Légionnaire (although he is also abandoned after one night of love).

Musically, the songs on the album were described as "overly slick funk tunes that border on both new wave and rap." The lyrics of the songs are mostly written in French, English, or "Franglais". The title track, "You're Under Arrest", features rapped backing vocals and references English synthpop group Bronski Beat. The track "Five Easy Pisseuses" thematically deals with sexuality, and features a tenor saxophone solo performed by Stan Harrison. In contrast to the melancholic nature of the original song, Gainsbourg's "jazzy Caribbean-kissed version" of "Gloomy Sunday" was described as a "lounge-y love song". The cover version of "Mon légionnaire" also takes inspirations from the disco genre and features a synthesizer programming work over Gainsbourg's "gravelly" vocal delivery.

== Critical reception ==
Professional ratings
Review scores
Source	Rating
AllMusic	3/5 stars

Thom Jurek of AllMusic commented, "The album seems to leave the subtle ironies of Gainsbourg's demented lyrics behind – which is too bad because this record is a step up lyrically from Love on the Beat." Nevertheless, he also wrote: "this is a record of solid material that misses (if only just) because of Billy Rush's heavy hand. No matter though, because the Gainsbourg faithful will have to have it anyway."

== Track listing ==
All tracks are written by Serge Gainsbourg, except where noted.

No.	Title	Writer(s)	Length
1.	"You're Under Arrest"		4:13
2.	"Five Easy Pisseuses"		3:28
3.	"Baille Baille Samantha"		3:24
4.	"Suck Baby Suck"		3:46
5.	"Gloomy Sunday"	music: Rezső Seress; lyrics: Sam M. Lewis; arranged by Gainsbourg	3:44
6.	"Aux enfants de la chance"		4:07
7.	"Shotgun"		4:01
8.	"Glass Securit"		3:38
9.	"Dispatch Box"		2:53
10.	"Mon légionnaire"	lyrics: Raymond Asso; music: Marguerite Monnot; arranged by Gainsbourg	5:35

== Personnel ==
Credits adapted from liner notes.

Musicians

- Serge Gainsbourg – vocals, piano, synthesizers, arranger
- Billy Rush – guitar, production
- John K. (John Kumnick) – bass guitar
- Tony "Thunder" Smith – drums
- Brenda White King – backing vocals
- Curtis King, Jr. – backing vocals
- Gary Georgett – piano, synthesizers
- Stan Harrison – saxophone

Technical

- Philippe Lerichomme – production
- Dominique Blanc-Francard – engineering
- André Perriat – mastering
- Huart/Cholley, Serge Gainsbourg – graphics
- Gilles Cappé – photography
