= Show (Brigitte Bardot album) =

Studio album by Brigitte Bardot
- Released: 1968
- Genre: Pop
- Length: 35:13
- Label: Disc'AZ

Brigitte Bardot chronology
Bonnie and Clyde (1968)	Show (1968)

Show is the fourth and final studio album by the French singer and actress Brigitte Bardot, released in 1968 by Disc'AZ. The album served as the soundtrack to a television special produced by Bardot herself. It contains 15 tracks in total, including five instrumentals. The vocal selections explore a variety of styles, from gentle ballads to psychedelic pop arrangements. Notably, several songs on the album have accompanying video clips, a practice that resembled early music videos.

== Background and release ==
Prior to the album's release, the AZ label issued a four-track extended play (EP) featuring original songs by Rivière and Bourgeois, all of which would later appear on Show. The lead track was titled "Oh Qu'il est Vilain". L. P. Braconnot from Brazilian newspaper Tribuna da Imprensa rated the EP three out of five stars. Around the same time, one of the tracks, "Harley Davidson", was released as a single and generated international attention. An English-language version was reportedly planned by Tony Rivers for release on MCA Records.

In 1969, Record World reported that the Argentine label Producciones Fermata issued a localized edition of the album titled Brigitte Bardot y su show. The magazine praised the contributions of composer Francis Lai, renowned for his work on A Man and a Woman.

== Singles ==
The single "Harley Davidson" / "Contact" entered the Belgian Ultratop 50 Singles Chart (Wallonia) on 30 December 1967, debuting at number 39. It spent a total of 11 weeks on the chart, with its final appearance on 9 March 1968, at number 48. Its peak was No. 16, where it stayed for one week. The single received a three-out-of-five-star rating from the Brazilian newspaper Tribuna da Imprensa. Sérgio Nona of Diário de Pernambuco stated that the single featured excellent accompaniment by Michel Colombier and his orchestra. He then offered a critical observation, noting that Bardot's singing is not particularly remarkable, but the songs are always enjoyable, as is the case with "Contact".

The single "Ay que viva la sangria" debuted at number 30 on 13 September 1969 in the Dutch Charts. However, it exited the chart the next week, marking a one-week stay with no further climb.

== Critical reception ==
Professional ratings
Review scores
Source	Rating
AllMusic	3/5 stars

According to critic Zac Johnson, Show stands out among Brigitte Bardot's musical releases for its eccentric and theatrical nature. He highlights the album's mix of groovy go-go tracks like "Harley Davidson" and "Contact", alongside the sultry ballad "Mister Sun", which he associates with Bardot's charm. Johnson acknowledges that while Bardot was never expected to be an operatic vocalist, her recordings, particularly on this album, are fun, humorous, and offer a distinctly entertaining pop experience, especially for fans of obscure French pop music from the 1960s.

Sérgio Nona of Diário de Pernambuco commented that Bardot's voice is not particularly strong and her performances are unremarkable, but highlighted the album's interesting musical selection. He singled out "Oh qu'il est vilain", "Paris", "Je reviendrai", "On demenage", "David B.", "Contact", "Harley Davidson" and "Marseillaise generique" as standout tracks.

== Track listing ==
Side 1
No.	Title	Writer(s)	Length
1.	"Harley Davidson"	Serge Gainsbourg	2:30
2.	"Marseillaise générique"	Francis Lai (Orchestre)	2:10
3.	"Mister Sun"	Jean-Max Rivière, Gérard Bourgeois	3:12
4.	"Ay que viva la sangria"	Jean-Max Rivière, Gérard Bourgeois	2:30
5.	"Ce n'est pas vrai"	Jean-Max Rivière, Gérard Bourgeois	1:38
6.	"Gang gang"	Jean-Max Rivière, Gérard Bourgeois	2:30
7.	"Saint-Tropez"	Francis Lai (Orchestre)	1:10
8.	"Port Grimaud"	Francis Lai (Orchestre)	3:00

Side 2
No.	Title	Writer(s)	Length
1.	"Oh qu'il est vilain"	Jean-Max Rivière, Gérard Bourgeois	2:25
2.	"Paris"	Francis Lai (Orchestre)	1:35
3.	"Je reviendrai toujours vers toi"	Jean-Max Rivière, Gérard Bourgeois	2:23
4.	"On déménage"	Jean-Max Rivière, Gérard Bourgeois	2:03
5.	"Le diable est anglais"	Jean-Max Rivière, Gérard Bourgeois	2:40
6.	"David B."	Francis Lai (Orchestre)	1:10
7.	"Contact"	Serge Gainsbourg	2:17
Total length:			35:13

== Personnel ==
Credits adapted from the liner notes of Show.

- Arrangements:
  - Charles Blackwell (tracks A3, A6, B3, B4),
  - Christian Gaubert (tracks A2, A7, A8, B2, B6),
  - Michel Colombier (tracks A1, B7),
  - Paul Piot (tracks A4, A5, B1, B5).
- Composer, writers:
  - Francis Lai (tracks A2, A7, A8, B2, B6),
  - Jean-Max Rivière (tracks A3 to A6, B1, B3 to B5),
  - Serge Gainsbourg (tracks A1, B7)
- Photo (front side): Sam Levin – Gamma
- Photos (back side): B. Hermann
