= You Rascal You =

Song
- Published: 1929
- Songwriter: Sam Theard

"You Rascal You" is an American song written by Sam Theard in 1929, and legally titled "I'll Be Glad When You're Dead". The lyrics take the form of threats and complaints leveled against a man who has repaid the singer's hospitality and kindness by running off with the singer's wife.

Popular versions of the song were released by The Mills Brothers (No. 3 Pop, 1932), Red Nichols & His Five Pennies (No. 17 Pop, 1931), Cab Calloway (No. 17 Pop, 1931) and Louis Armstrong (No. 13, 1931).

It has also been recorded by Clarence Willams, Sidney Bechet, Fats Waller, Tampa Red, Louis Jordan, Jimmie Noone, Champion Jack Dupree, Louis Prima, Fats Domino, John Fogerty, Dr. John, Henry "Rufe" Johnson, Ingrid Michaelson, Taj Mahal, The Jazz Passengers and Hanni El Khatib, whose version was used in a television advertisement for the movie The Imposter and for the Netflix limited series Death by Lightning.

Theard made a follow-up song in 1930 titled "I Done Caught That Rascal Now".

== French version ==
The song was adapted into French under the title "Vieille canaille" in 1951 by Jacques Plante for Jacques Hélian and his orchestra, with Jean Marco as singer. Serge Gainsbourg covered it in 1979 in a reggae version on his album Aux armes et cætera. He also recorded it as a duet with Eddy Mitchell on the latter's album Eddy Paris Mitchell in 1986, and as a single that sold 75,000 copies.
