= Harley Davidson (song) =

1967 single by Brigitte Bardot

Single by Brigitte Bardot

from the album Show
- B-side: "Contact"
- Released: 1967
- Label: Disc'AZ
- Songwriter: Serge Gainsbourg

Audio
- "Harley Davidson" on YouTube

"Harley Davidson" is a 1967 song by Brigitte Bardot. It was written by Serge Gainsbourg.

== Music and lyrics ==
Rolling Stone describes the song as a "sixties rock & roll number about all the things that made sixties rock & roll great – motorcycles, good sex, and living fast and dying young".

The lyrics "echo the imagery of Bonnie and Clyde, James Dean, and Marlon Brando". Delta FM calls the song "an ode to freedom and female liberation".

== Writing and recording ==
The song was written by Gainsbourg during his short affair with Bardot. According to the Swiss 24 heures, those were extremely prolific "inspired days and sleepless nights" for Gainsbourg, when he wrote several cult songs including this one.

Gainsbourg recalled in a 1972 interview to Paris Match: "I suggested we listen to 'Harley Davidson'. At her place, we were like two cats, observing each other, almost in confrontation. We were overwhelmed by utter shyness and riddled with stage fright." He continued: "When she sang 'Que m'importe de mourir en Harley Davidson' ('What do I care about dying on a Harley-Davidson'), those words hit me like a ton of bricks; they were incredibly sensual. On the night of the recording, our lives merged into a continuous current that nothing could divide. The flash was blinding, and our passion was magnificent.

== Music video ==
In the music video, broadcast in December 1967 as part of Brigitte Bardot's TV special, she mounted a Harley-Davidson bike while dressed in a leather tunic. She also wore Roger Vivier thigh-high boots. As the result, the model, called "Belle Vivier" and characterized by its slanted heel, was propelled to iconic status.

== Reception ==
The French TV station BFM TV, the French radio station Delta FM, and the Swiss daily newspaper 24 heures included the song in their top lists of "Brigitte Bardot's best cult hits".

== Covers ==
"Harley Davidson"

Single by Serge Gainsbourg

from the album Enregistrement public au Théâtre Le Palace
- B-side: "Docteur Jekyll et Monsieur Hyde"
- Released: 1980
- Label: Philips
- Songwriter: Serge Gainsbourg

Serge Gainsbourg covered the song live. He included it on his first two live albums, Enregistrement public au Théâtre Le Palace (1980)—also releasing the album cut as a single (c/w "Docteur Jekyll et Monsieur Hyde")—and Serge Gainsbourg Live (1986).

== Charts ==
Chart (1967)	Peak position
Belgium (Ultratop 50 Wallonia)	16
