= Initials B.B. (song) =

- 1968 French single cover

Single by Serge Gainsbourg

from the album Initials B.B.
- Released: June 1968
- Recorded: May 1968
- Studio: Chappell Studios, London
- Genre: Chanson, baroque pop
- Length: 3:36
- Label: Phillips
- Songwriter: Serge Gainsbourg

Initials B.B. is a 1968 song by Serge Gainsbourg. It was the opening single of his album Initials B.B. and is about French actress and sex symbol Brigitte Bardot, who was so famous at the time that her initials were enough to know whom people referred to. Gainsbourg once had an affair with her and this was his way of expressing how he felt about it.

== Song ==
The song is a poetic evocation of Gainsbourg's relationship with Bardot in 1967. The song quotes from the first movement of Antonin Dvorak's Ninth Symphony, better known as From the New World and lyrically quotes from Edgar Allan Poe's The Raven in its opening lines. The song also mentions the book L'Amour monstre by Louis Pauwels, which was recommended to Gainsbourg by Bardot. It was recorded between February and April 1968.

== Music video ==
A music video was made, featuring various clips of Bardot during photo shoots and recording sessions.

== In popular culture ==
The song was once used for a TV commercial of the perfume Shalimar by Guerlain.

English singer and songwriter Charli XCX named it as one of her five favourite songs of all time in 2013

== Cover versions ==
Mick Harvey covered it on his album Intoxicated Man (1995) as the final track on that record.

In 2012 it was also covered by Therion on their album Les Fleurs du Mal. They also made a controversial video clip for it, where women dressed in military uniform march and show their bare breasts.

In 2022, it was released as a single by Boz Boorer and James Maker on Fabrique Records.
