= 1963 Théâtre des Capucines =

Live album by Serge Gainsbourg
- Released: 2001
- Recorded: October 1963
- Venue: Théâtre des Capucines, Paris, France
- Genre: chanson
- Language: French
- Label: Universal Records
- Producer: Claude Dejacques

Serge Gainsbourg chronology
Le Zénith de Gainsbourg (1989)	1963 Théâtre des Capucines (2001)

1963 Théâtre des Capucines is the fourth live album by Serge Gainsbourg (the first recorded chronologically), released in 2001, featuring a 1963 concert at the Théâtre des Capucines, Paris. It features the same type of minimalist jazz arrangement as his 1963 album, Gainsbourg Confidentiel; the 2001 re-release of which actually featured this album in its entirety as bonus tracks.

== Track listing ==
1. "Présentation de Serge Gainsbourg" - 0:26
2. "Les Femmes des uns sous les corps des autres" - 2:26
3. "Intoxicated Man" - 1:45
4. "La Recette de l'amour fou" - 1:50
5. "Ce mortel ennui" - 2:12
6. "La Javanaise" - 2:22
7. "Maxim's" - 1:26
8. "Negative Blues" - 1:47
9. "L'Amour à la papa" - 2:16
10. "Dieu, que les hommes sont méchantes" - 1:57
11. "Personne" - 2:56

== Personnel ==
- Claude Dejacques - artistic production
- Serge Gainsbourg - vocals
- Elek Bacsik - electric guitar
- Michel Gaudry - double bass
