= Le Zénith de Gainsbourg =

Live album by Serge Gainsbourg
- Released: 1989
- Recorded: 23–25 March 1988
- Venue: Zénith de Paris, Paris, France
- Genre: chanson
- Length: 71:23
- Language: French
- Label: Philips Records
- Producer: Philippe Lerichomme, Billy Rush

Serge Gainsbourg chronology
You're Under Arrest (1987)	Le Zénith de Gainsbourg (1989)	1963 Théâtre des Capucines (2009)

Le Zénith de Gainsbourg is the third live album by Serge Gainsbourg, released in 1989, featuring a March 1988 concert at the Zénith de Paris. It was the last album released in Gainsbourg's lifetime.

== Track listing ==
1. "You're Under Arrest"
2. "Qui est "in" qui est "out"
3. "Five Easy pisseuses"
4. "Hey Man Amen"
5. "L'Homme à tête de chou"
6. "Manon"
7. "Valse de Melody"
8. "Dispatch Box"
9. "Harley David Son of a Bitch"
10. "You You You but not You"
11. "Seigneur et saigneur"
12. "Bonnie and Clyde"
13. "Gloomy Sunday"
14. "Couleur café"
15. "Aux armes et cætera"
16. "Aux enfants de la chance"
17. "Les Dessous chics"
18. "Mon légionnaire"

== Personnel ==
- Serge Gainsbourg - vocals
- Billy Rush - guitar, musical director
- John K (John Kumnick) - bass
- Gary Georgett - keyboards
- Tony "Thunder" Smith - drums
- Stan Harrison - saxophone
- Curtis King Jr., Denis Collins - backing vocals

== Charts ==
Chart performance for Le Zénith de Gainsbourg
Chart (2021)	Peak position
Belgian Albums (Ultratop Wallonia)	30
French Albums (SNEP)	84

== Certifications ==
Region	Certification	Certified units/sales
France (SNEP)	2× Platinum	40,000^{*}
^{*} Sales figures based on certification alone.
