= Mauvaises nouvelles des étoiles =

Studio album by Serge Gainsbourg
- Released: 17 November 1981
- Recorded: 21–27 September 1981
- Studio: Compass Point, New Providence, Bahamas
- Genre: Reggae, dub poetry
- Length: 37:07
- Language: French
- Label: Mercury, Universal
- Producer: Philippe Lerichomme

Serge Gainsbourg chronology
Enregistrement public au Théâtre Le Palace (1980)	Mauvaises nouvelles des étoiles (1981)	Love on the Beat (1984)

Mauvaises nouvelles des étoiles (Bad news from the stars) is the fourteenth studio album by French singer-songwriter Serge Gainsbourg. It was released through Mercury Records and Universal Music Group on 17 November 1981. Produced by Philippe Lerichomme, the album musically follows the reggae style of its predecessor, Aux Armes et Caetera (1979).

== Critical reception ==
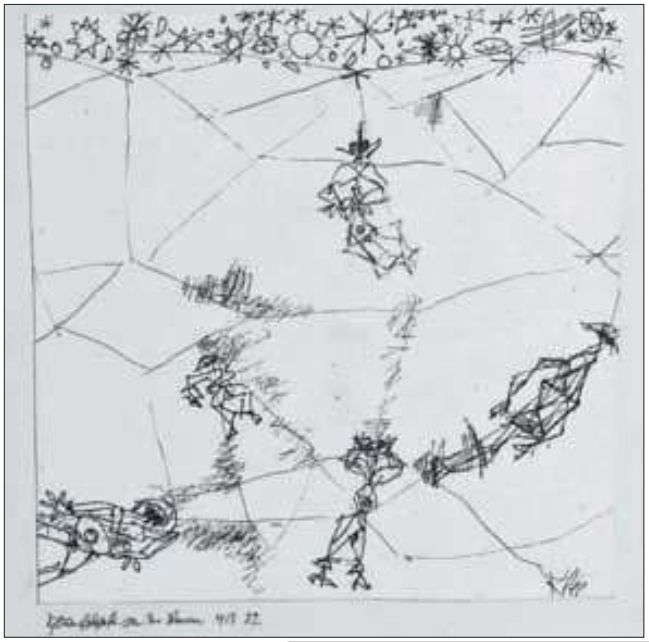
Schlimme Botschaft von den Sternen (Bad news from the stars), Paul Klee's drawing that inspired the title of the album.

Professional ratings
Review scores
Source	Rating
AllMusic	2.5/5 stars

John Bush of AllMusic gave the album a mixed review, stating: "The breezy melodies of his prime material from the '60s and '70s are unfortunately missing." He also further added: "Though the sound and production is up to Gainsbourg's usual high standards, the songs are much weaker than expected. With little to anchor it except the players and Gainsbourg's seedy vocal delivery, Mauvaises Nouvelles des Etoiles simply floats away."

== Track listing ==
All tracks are written by Serge Gainsbourg.

No.	Title	Length
1.	"Overseas Telegram"	3:36
2.	"Ecce homo"	3:20
3.	"Mickey maousse"	2:32
4.	"Juif et Dieu"	3:13
5.	"Shush Shush Charlotte"	2:46
6.	"Toi mourir"	2:05
7.	"La Nostalgie camarade"	3:23
8.	"Bana basadi balalo"	3:03
9.	"Evguénie Sokolov"	2:53
10.	"Negusa nagast"	3:05
11.	"Strike"	2:59
12.	"Bad News from the Stars"	1:26

== Personnel ==
Credits adapted from liner notes.

- Serge Gainsbourg – vocals, arrangements
- The I Threes (from Bob Marley and the Wailers : Marcia Griffiths, Rita Marley, Judy Mowatt) – backing vocals
- Robbie Shakespeare – bass guitar
- Sly Dunbar – drums
- Mikey "Mao" Chung – lead guitar
- Radcliffe "Dougie" Bryan – rhythm guitar
- Ansel Collins – organ, acoustic piano
- Uziah "Sticky" Thompson – percussion

Technical

- Steven Stanley – recording, mixing
- Lord Snowdon – photography

== Charts ==
Chart	Peak position
French Albums (SNEP)	47

== Certifications and sales ==
Region	Certification	Certified units/sales
France (SNEP)	Gold	100,000^{*}
^{*} Sales figures based on certification alone.
