= Bruno Blum =

French musician (born 1960)

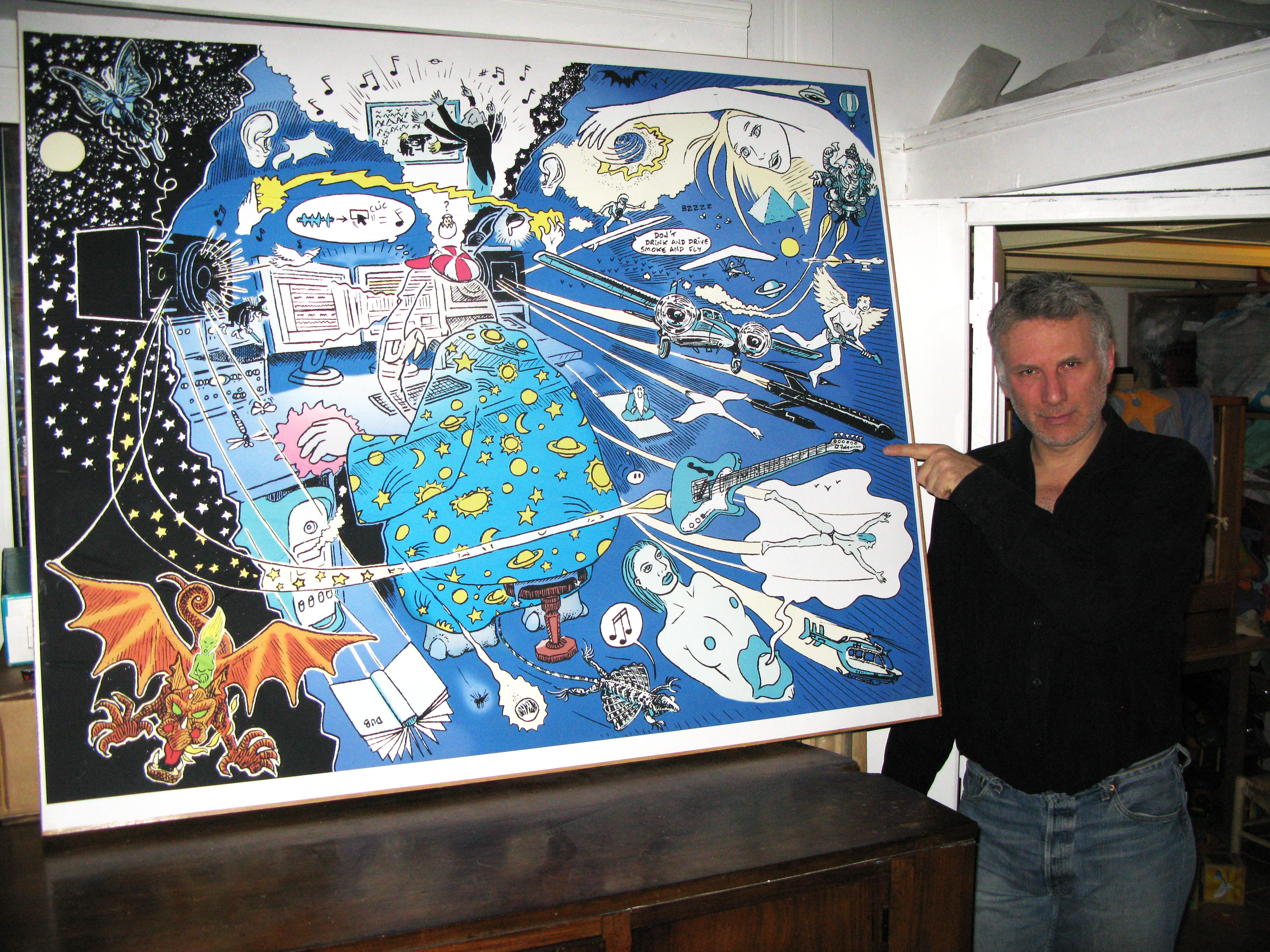
- Bruno Blum shows his Don't Drink and Drive, Smoke and Fly artwork picturing a sound engineer mixing dub music. Click to enlarge.

Background information
- Also known as: Doc Reggae
- Born: October 4, 1957 (age 69)
- Origin: Paris, France
- Genres: French chanson, reggae, rock, blues, dub
- Occupations: Singer, guitarist, songwriter, music producer, musicologist, cartoonist, painter, photographer, writer, speaker, vegan activist
- Instruments: Guitar, vocals, bass guitar
- Years active: 1977–present
- Labels: Human Race, Rastafari, Ménilmontant International, Out Here, etc.
- Website: www.docreggae.com

Bruno Blum (born October 4, 1957, Vichy, France) is a French singer songwriter, guitar player, music producer and musicologist sometimes nicknamed "Doc Reggae". He is mostly known for his work in the reggae, Caribbean music, rock music and African musics fields, and also works as a cartoon and comic book artist, illustrator, visual artist, photographer, video director, writer, journalist, music historian, interpreter and speaker.

== An eclectic character ==
On the back cover of his extensive Electric Dandy Lou Reed biography, his publisher introduced him in the following words: "A musician and producer, illustrator and speaker, and a legendary music journalist for Best Magazine, Bruno Blum lived in London during the reggae-punk years." Originally renowned as the enfant terrible of French rock critics based in London in 1977–1982, Bruno Blum started out in teenage punk group Private Vices in London in 1977–81. He gradually embodied an adventurer-musician globe-trotter figure, a free-spirited, astute lyric writer and a remarkable guitar player, as well as a historian of English-speaking popular music, photographer and skilled graphic artist. A fully bilingual (English-French) vegan and ecologist, he has lived without drugs or alcohol for over twenty years. In the "Human Race" CD booklet, a Blum production, noted American reggae historian Roger Steffens described him as "a virtuosic polymath" and concluded: "An artist, producer, director, archivist, musician as well as author of and contributor to dozens of books [including 'Jamaïque, sur la piste du reggae,' where Blum tells his own account of his musical adventures in Jamaica], Doc Reggae stands supreme among France's reggae chroniclers in his perceptive observations and the impressive variety of his accomplishments, not the least of which can be found on the album you now hold."

=== Musician ===
As a teenage bass player with Private Vices he was part of the late 1970s London punk movement and was later the first French musician to record and release dub music, as well as afrobeat. He has released several French songs albums (including the classic reggae album Nuage d'Éthiopie) in a wide variety of styles. "Viens Fumer un P'tit Joint à la Maison," a reggae pastiche of the drinking hit song "Viens Boire un P'tit Coup à la Maison" obtained over four million views on YouTube. His versions of Bob Marley's "War" also adapted in French as "Guerre," was another couple of hits. A Blum-produced version of "War" featuring a duet between Haile Selassie and Bob Marley reached number one in British magazine Black Echoes charts in April 1998 and remains an enduring reggae classic. Blum is known, among other things, for his work with the press-acclaimed Asmara All Stars and on Serge Gainsbourg's two studio reggae albums, which he has produced new mixes of, as well as dub and deejay versions in 2003. He also produced a definitive mix of Serge Gainsbourg's Gainsbourg Et Cætera Palace live album in 2006. In 2015 two "Super DeLuxe" triple CD sets were released in the form of books: Gainsbourg and the Revolutionaries (Gainsbourg's three reggae albums in the Blum mixes form, including 8 previously unreleased tracks) and Gainsbourg in Dub, which contains 50 previously unreleased dubs. As a producer he mixed eight Bob Marley & The Wailers tracks included on the Freedom Time album. He also released his own dub work, much of it done in Jamaica, on his Sophisticated Love album by Dub De Luxe. First and foremost a singer-songwriter in the French tradition, Blum also performs steadily with his rock/soul/blues and reggae bands as a singer and lead guitar player.

His work often includes a touch of humor, and his art complements his Jamaica, Nigeria and USA-inspired music. Influenced by the electric, genuine analog sound and militant spirit of the 1970s, his wide array of works melt into a coherent whole, where different styles are approached in true eclectic fashion. Alternatively playing blues, dub (which he often mixes himself on analog sound boards), rock, jazz, afrobeat, reggae, etc. His French ("Guerre") and English versions of Bob Marley's "War" recorded with the Wailers gave him some international exposure and recognition.

He also created Human Race Records, a vinyl record label in Jamaica. According to Roger Steffens in the Human Race anthology booklet notes, he is an "independent polymath thriving on passion" and always funded his own recordings, which put forward his individual, idiosyncratic lyric style.

He occasionally records "updated" pastiches of well-known songs in both English and French, including I Feel-Like-I'm-A-Fixin'-To-Die Rag, the Viens fumer un p'tit joint à la maison hit and satirical songs such as "Ça Bouge (sur la place Rouge)". His own French songs output often displays puzzling double-entendre lyrics. In 2015, he formed Cabaret Végane, the first all-vegan group, releasing an album of mostly original songs the following year and playing several shows in Paris, singing with female singer Joy Gross, who stars in 'Clémentine est végane,' a hit music video on Facebook; (also in English as 'Clementine Is a Vegan'). Following the demise of the record industry, Bruno Blum was also one of the first French musicians to release most of his output on brunoblum.bandcamp.com, where most of his recordings can be heard.

=== Writer, musicologist ===
Besides his extensive work as a lyric writer, Blum has completed a master's degree in music, musicology, creation and society and speaks worldwide on the history of reggae music, African musics and other rock and blues culture-related subjects as well as veganism. His reggae lectures come with his reggae photography exhibition. In 2013 he was awarded a Prix Coup de Cœur de l'Académie Charles Cros for his 3CD set and booklet for Jamaica Folk, Trance, Possession - Roots of Rastafari 1939–1961, and in 2021 a Prix Coup de Cœur Musiques du Monde de l'Académie Charles Cros for his Les Musiques des Caraïbes set.

Written in a lively style, several of his books on music history give him an authority status in the French-speaking world. These include Lou Reed, Bob Marley and John Lennon biographies, best-seller Le Reggae, a fully illustrated Jamaican travel journal autobiography and a major contribution to best-selling Le Dictionnaire du Rock. His bilingual English-French documented music reissues (he runs three series of documented CD box sets for Frémeaux & Associés for which he wrote substantial, informative ethnomusicologic booklets) have become scholar references. Major Bob Marley & the Wailers reissues with U.S. partner Roger Steffens have also given him some international recognition. He is often working as an interpreter, has published many translations and texts in English, including English versions of his many Frémeaux & Associés booklets, translated six books including Bruce Conforth's award-winning Robert Johnson biography and has also directed several documentaries for television. In addition, Blum has moved on and published two substantial surveys on societal issues: his book Shit! Tout Sur Le Cannabis includes an autobiographical chapter and the 2016 De Viandard à Végane is written in the form of an autobiography depicting his growing awareness of veganism through his musical career. Perhaps his most important effort in the musicology field is the book Les Musiques des Caraïbes, which extensively depicts the history of each Caribbean island's original music before the 1960s 'big mix.' Each chapter of the book is based on a CD box set booklet originally released by Frémeaux & Associés and later extended for the book purpose, which allows the reader to listen to each chapter's contents. Forewords by Roger Steffens and French ex-Minister of Justice of Guyane origin Christiane Taubira complement this major undertaking.

=== Illustrator, cartoonist, artist, photographer, filmmaker ===
Blum has published many cartoons, illustrations and comic strips in several of his books, in U.K. comic books and newspapers as well as a long list of French magazines, including Best, Actuel, L'Environnement Magazine, Panda Magazine and Hara-Kiri. Perhaps his most significant work as a graphic artist is his 150-page Rock And Roll Comics album, a collection of his early comic strips, featuring a popular Motörhead story, done at a time when he played in a London punk rock group and was the London correspondent of French rock magazine Best. This "autobio-graphic novel" includes time period fiction stories, previously unpublished art and also features a substantial chapter of his rock photography.

A prolific artist, besides photography, illustration and comic strips, he has also always produced graphic work meant to be exhibited. He often draws a blurry line between plastic arts and comic strip, as in the "Don't Drink and Drive, Smoke and Fly" series (see picture above) where the story jumps out of the pages to become a series of pictures, before going back to its initial, former frame. He has also published illustrated travel books and many satiric cartoons.

As a reporter photographer he has accumulated archives published in several of his books alongside his illustrations. His photo exhibition "Jamaica on the Reggae Tracks" has been shown all over France since 2008. His 2007 book of the same name, Jamaïque sur la piste du reggae features a mix of his photographs, narrative and art. Blum is one of the few photographers who managed to take pictures of nearly all of the British new wave groups, including Buzzcocks, Sex Pistols, the Clash, and many US artists such as Iggy Pop, the Heartbreakers, Johnny Thunders, Devo, David Johansen and Patti Smith as well as several lesser-known groups, as shown in his Fils de Punk photo exhibition premiered at Stereolux in Nantes (France) in March–April 2017. In 2017, he publish an illustrated travel book, Carnets exceptionnels de mes voyages. He has also directed Tenor Saw's classic Ring the Alarm reggae video as well as other videos, and worked as a journalist/director for Tracks, an Arte TV channel show about music culture. His artwork can be seen in the video of his song "Papa Legba," which was directed by Pascal Le Gras (best known for his cover artwork for British post-punk group the Fall). The hit video Clémentine est végane (English version: Clementine Is a Vegan) features some of his art, as well as Le Gras', Mandryka and street artist Invader. He also published several independent animal rights cartoon books.

== Biography ==
=== Early life ===
A Spirou magazine reader and André Franquin (Spirou, Marsupilami, Gaston Lagaffe) fan, the song Les Élucubrations d'Antoine was a revelation for him at an early age. When advertising was permitted on French television from October 1, 1968, his parents of humble origins Nicole and Tony Blum started producing advertising films. Their success was immediate. Their company, named FBI (Falby Blum International) had already produced several films by young director Jean-Jacques Annaud when they were awarded the Palme d'Or at the Cannes Advertising Film Festival in 1971 for Annaud's Crackers Belin film. The company had opened offices in five countries as Tony Blum moved to Toronto in Canada, where his son joined him during the 1974 and 1975 summers. Aged fifteen, he was already bilingual after several stays in the UK, USA and Canada. His father produced the first feature film by Jérôme Savary Le boucher, la star et l'orpheline (1975). Bruno Blum got to meet and know his parents' colleagues and friends, including directors Jean-Jacques Annaud, Ridley Scott and actors such as Pierre Desproges and Jerry Lewis, but he was not interested in advertising. A dedicated comic strip reader, as early as twelve he was the founder of several amateur college comic magazines with his classmates. After an encounter with Asterix author René Goscinny, he created a magazine named Klaus in the Paris art school Les Arts Appliqués where he studied comic book art with Georges Pichard, Jacques Lob and Yves Got. In 1974–1975, the very young editor gathered a team of talented artists that would all become professionals, including Bernar, Fernand Zacot, Klaus, Jean Teulé and classmate Jean-Marie Blanche, son of the famous French comedian and humorist Francis Blanche, an inspiration to both friends. Failing all studies, Blum was evicted out of three colleges, including two art schools. Self-taught from then on, he would build teams following the same pattern, being the prime mover in many of his future projects.

=== Move to London ===
Following two convictions for record theft, and as his parents' company was going bankrupt, causing them to lose almost everything, in 1976-1977 the drifting teenager moved to London to study animation film with Oscar Grillo (who directed an animation film for Linda and Paul McCartney) and keenly attended rock clubs. In 1977–1978 he lived in North London's Stamford Hill Jamaican neighbourhood where he discovered reggae sound systems and dub music. He also made the earliest known recording of a then unknown band, the Police, with a hand stereo recorder at London's Roxy Club on March 3, 1977. Going through straits, he stayed in London squats, sharing houses with punk rock musicians including Private Vices and the Electric Chairs. A precocious, gifted person, he had already formed a rock group when he started writing for glossy magazine Best, a popular rock monthly for which he was London correspondent from 1977 to 1981 as chronicler, reporter, illustrator and photographer. He would then work for years with a small team comprising Christian Lebrun, Francis Dordor and Patrick Eudeline, travelling (and recording) to the UK, USA and Jamaica as a reporter. His successful In the City column, in which he published accounts of the very influential British music scene of the time, was written in lively, vivid gonzo style and left its mark on the French youth. He met several reggae artists, including Linton Kwesi Johnson, Steel Pulse, Peter Tosh, Toots and the Maytals, Bob Marley and widely contributed to promoting reggae music among the French youth with his stories in popular Best Magazine. He also interviewed rock artists, including Nico, Lou Reed, John Cale, Wilko Johnson, Johnny Thunders and the Heartbreakers, the Clash, the Sex Pistols, the Rolling Stones, Paul McCartney, Lenny Kravitz, the Stranglers, Fela Kuti and many more. By 1978, he had become a daily contributor as London correspondent and chronicler to nationwide French radio station Europe 1's Monde de la Musique show hosted by Pierre Lescure. He was recording and touring the UK in 1978-1979 with British punk group Private Vices, which he founded in 1977 with Christophe Ruhn. He was to be the first French journalist to write about the Pretenders, Devo, Linton Kwesi Johnson, Madness, Motörhead and the then-unknown Stray Cats, which he put up in his London squat as they first arrived from New York City. He also drew their original logo (as seen on the original Runaway Boys single cover), and drummer Slim Jim Phantom's tattoo showing a drum set bearing his name. His Rock and Roll Comics book is a testimony of his rock artwork and photographs from this London phase. In 1979–1981 he had a love affair with the late Saskia Cohen-Tanugi, who appeared in the James Bond film Never Say Never Again with Sean Connery and later became a noted theater director and writer.

=== 1980s ===
Blum was a militant ecologist since the age of fourteen, and after discussing the matter with Pretenders singer Chrissie Hynde, he went vegetarian like her, a theme he would later sing about in his songs "Clementine Is a Vegan" and "Les Andouilles" and write much about in his animalist, 2016 autobiography De Viandard à végane.

Blum then became a DJ at the London Marquee Club as an occasional replacement for his girlfriend, DJ Mandy Hermitage. Initially published in Best, his fiction comic strip Rock Commando staging Motörhead was published in New Music News in London, then issued by the band as a comic book in the UK. He then created the Nutty Boys comic book for pop group Madness, drawing their biopic in issue #1. Blum came back to live in Paris after a busking episode in Nice in the summer of 1982 with Nice-born photographer Youri Lenquette on second guitar. In 1983 he formed Les Amours, a six-piece vocal group which recorded and toured in 1984. In 1984-85 Blum begun a side career as fashion model, posing for several advertising pictures, including for France Inter radio. Still writing for Best in the 1980s, for a time he contributed to the Les Enfants du Rock rock TV show with Antoine de Caunes as a reporter and published cartoons in the magazines Rigolo, Best and Zoulou, an Actuel magazine offshoot.

In 1985, as seen in several TV shows, including Michel Drucker's, he was featured live in Catherine Ferry's rock backing band produced by French pop star Daniel Balavoine. Blum then recorded a few demos of his compositions in 1986 with a five-piece version of Les Amours not including the vocal group. After dealing with some personal problems reported in his Cultures Cannabis book, he has since abstained from using any legal (alcohol, tobacco) or illegal drug. In 1989 he recorded with some of Ziggy Marley's musicians in Kingston, Jamaica where he pressed his "Des Couleurs" vinyl single. In late 1989, he recorded and released Ça Bouge (Sur la Place Rouge) in Paris, coinciding with the fall of the Berlin Wall. His first album Bruno Blum (1989) assembled these various recordings. He became the first French musician to have played, produced and released a dub record. A video of his rock song L'Histoire de ma Guitare taken from the album was broadcast several times on M6 television in France.

=== 1990s ===
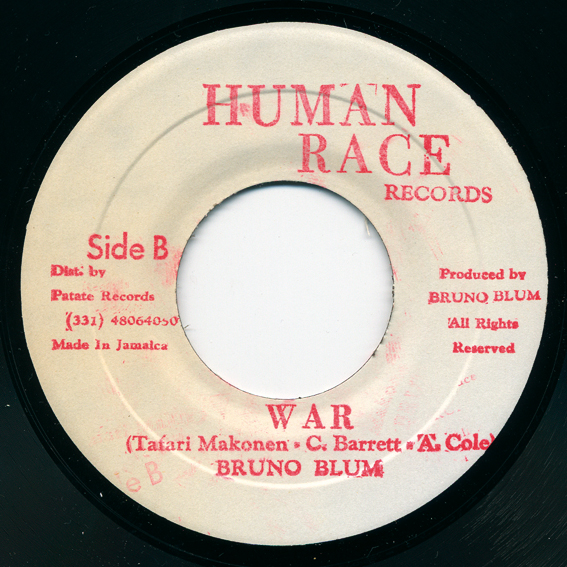
A 1997 record pressed on Bruno Blum's Jamaican label Human Race Records.

In 1990 Bruno Blum played onstage with Willy DeVille and joined Bo Diddley live at Le Casino de Paris. A noted singer and guitar player, in 1990–1994 he led a rock cover band featuring John Weeks and other American musicians named the Sexy Frogs, with whom he recorded the original "J'aime les blondes" as well as various original songs. In 1994 he was the editor of a Best special reggae issue for which he interviewed Lee "Scratch" Perry, among others. In 1995 with the help of Patrick Zerbib and Léon Mercadet he then edited a special Bob Marley issue for one-shot new magazine Radio Nova Collector that was soon to become Nova Magazine. Blum persuaded Chris Blackwell to let him include a CD featuring Bob Marley's "Punky Reggae Party" and a rare dub of "Is This Love" entitled "Is This Dub" in the issue. He drew several album covers and published artwork in Backstage, Actuel (Kronik le Kritik), Best (Scud le Rok Kritik Sourd), Hara Kiri Hebdo (weekly comic strips on vegetarian culture), L'Environnement Magazine, Panda Magazine, hosted a short, daily radio show on Radio Nova and directed the documentary film Get Up, Stand Up – L'Histoire du Reggae produced by Jean-François Bizot for the Canal + channel. Jamaican producer Clement Dodd produced two of his original songs at Studio One in Kingston, Jamaica. As Dodd aka Coxsone saw Blum's Best of Reggae special issue, he nicknamed him "Doc Reggae", which has stuck since.

In partnership with American specialist Roger Steffens he conceived and produced a series of ten Bob Marley & the Wailers albums that include around a hundred rare or previously unreleased recordings (he also mixed eight of them), time period photographs and much previously unheard of 1967–1972 information. In 1997–2003 Blum revived the original Danny Sims-owned JAD American label in Paris at this occasion, and successfully released the albums in several countries.

Doc Reggae then created the Jamaican label Human Race Records and its European incarnation Rastafari Records, through which he released several reggae vinyl singles featuring the voices of Haile Selassie I, Marcus Garvey, Big Youth, King Stitt, Buffalo Bill and Doc Reggae himself, also playing the guitar on all tracks. A version of Bob Marley's "War" was recorded using the voice of the lyrics' creator himself, Haile Selassie I and surviving members of the Wailers. A vinyl single featuring Bob Marley and Haile Selassie I reached the #1 spot in the April 1998 of British magazine Echoes charts. The War Album was then recorded featuring Big Youth and Buffalo Bill. He also co-wrote, played on and produced several tracks sung by model/French song/jazz singer Annabelle Mouloudji in 1999.

In Jamaica he directed videos for Tenor Saw's Ring the Alarm and Buffalo Bill's Perfect Woman, as well as several TV reports for the Tracks show broadcast on the Arte channel. After the demise of Best in 1995 he joined competitor Rock & Folk magazine until 1999, then gave up all journalism work, excepting for a few stories published in Les Inrockuptibles, which he left in 2002.

=== 2000s ===
Pierre Astier published his first book, the comprehensive biography Lou Reed – Electric Dandy at Le Serpent à Plumes. A rock and reggae specialist, Blum was to publish a further twenty books, including some successful ones, among which:

- Le Reggae
- Bob Marley, le Reggae et les Rastas as well as his travel chronicles, fully illustrated with his photographs and artwork Jamaïque, sur la Piste du Reggae where he tells the story of his Jamaican adventures. He also co-signed three editions of Le Dictionnaire du Rock as a main contributor with Michka Assayas.
- De Viandard à Végane, his autobiography.

Still performing live through the decade, after the 2001 The War Album recorded with the Wailers, where he can be heard playing the guitar and voicing two tracks, he is noted as a producer and lyric writer on his second solo album Nuage d'Éthiopie, also in 2001. Released on his own De Luxe label, this reggae album includes the single "Si Je Reste" (adapted in French from the Clash's "Should I Stay or Should I Go"), a duet with Annabelle Mouloudji. Nuage d'Éthiopie gets good reviews. To Yves Bigot " French reggae has found its songwriter ". Backed by the Wailers on "Avis aux Amateurs", he put to music the letter in which Arthur Rimbaud breaks the news on his mother that he will remain in Africa. Going against the grain of fashionable electronic music, he forwards in a 1970s-influenced style where lyrics and skilled electric instruments players are pivotal. He refers to Boris Vian, Alain Bashung, Linton Kwesi Johnson, Jacques Dutronc (he has recorded a parody of Dutronc's "Et moi, et moi, et moi") and Serge Gainsbourg of whom he recorded a version of "L'Appareil à Sous" (originally recorded by Brigitte Bardot) – and soon an English version of "Lola Rastaquouère".

Bruno Blum's second album Nuage d'Éthiopie, 2001

Think Different, his third album of original compositions, was recorded in a wide array of styles and released in 2002 (featuring duets with Annabelle Mouloudji and John Hostetter), followed by Welikom 2 Lay-Gh-Us ! recorded in Lagos (Nigeria) with a 20-piece band from Fela Kuti's group, and released by BMG, which also reissued his Bob Marley 1967–1972 twelve-album series. JAD Records suddenly signed a distribution deal with Universal, and BMG was compelled to retrieve the entire JAD stock from the shops. The JAD delivery included two previously unreleased Peter Tosh albums, a Buffalo Bill album as well as Amala & Blum's Welikom 2 Lay-Gh-Us ! album which, although just released, was also retrieved from the shops by mistake (as it had nothing to do with JAD Records) in spite of getting daily airplay on José Artur's Pop Club show on France Inter. Nevertheless, Blum remains the first French musician to release an afrobeat album – deleted shortly after its release, it only reached about a hundred journalists.

In 2003 Universal Music released two double Serge Gainsbourg CD albums, Aux Armes Et Cætera and Mauvaises Nouvelles des Étoiles in a new 1970s style Kingston mix produced by Bruno Blum, featuring veteran Jamaican sound engineer Soljie Hamilton. Also included on the album are dub and deejay versions (including Lisa Dainjah, King Stitt, Lone Ranger and Big Youth). The two press-acclaimed albums unveil several previously unreleased recordings, among which the Gainsbourg composition "Ecce Homo Et Cætera". Blum also voices one track himself, an English rendition of "Lola Rastaquouère", and plays guitar on his new arrangement of "Marilou Reggae", recorded with Leroy "Horsemouth" Wallace on drums and Flabba Holt on bass.

After contributing to slam shows in his Ménilmontant neighborhood, he records slammer Nada's Live at the Olympic Café (2001) album. He also supplies artwork for the CD cover as well as the follow-up Ultrash, which he produces and plays on as Nada recites his lyrics over newly recorded instrumental versions of Velvet Underground songs. Two other ex-members of Best magazine's team participate to the album : Gilles Riberolles and Patrick Eudeline, who contributes with several short songs on Ultrash.

Gainsbourg... Et Cætera, a new Blum-produced mix (Thierry Bertomeu, engineer) of the poorly mixed, original Serge Gainsbourg live album Enregistrement Public au Théâtre Le Palace is released in 2006. This double CD includes five previously unreleased versions and an interview with Serge Gainsbourg.

Blum kept performing live with Dub De Luxe as well as, from 2006 in an American group playing classic 1930s/1960s R&B covers sometimes featuring pianist Gilbert Shelton, the well-known Fabulous Furry Freak Brothers comic book artist. Blum also produces an album by Shelton.

In 2006 he was invited to play a series of shows in Asmara, Eritrea by the French Ambassador in Eritrea. It is his first of a series of trips that would lead to producing an anthology album of the best Eritrean singers (released in 2010).

In June 2007, the publication of his book Culture Cannabis led Bruno Blum to an hour-long clash with Professor Jean Costentin live on national radio France Inter. In 2008 he obtains a Master in musicology in Paris and publishes Le Rap Est Né en Jamaïque (Rap Was Born in Jamaica) in 2009. He also produced the Harry Belafonte - Calypso, Mento & Folk 1954–1957 anthology. Still performing onstage, he MCs dances as deejay and selecter, and speaks regularly in conferences around his country and abroad. In 2009 as he was one of the main writers in Best Magazine he creates the Facebook group Best, le mensuel du rock. This internet site would eventually lead to Blum directing an anthology book of Best's best stories.

=== 2010s ===
In the summer of 2010 a major Emma Lavigne exhibition on punk rock visual aesthetics and photographs at the Rencontres d'Arles showed his collection of rare original punk records. At this occasion he spoke on punk musical aesthetics from 1930s jazz to 1940s–1970s rock music. In September, Doc Reggae performed at the Trois Baudets in Paris. For the first time, he offered a multimedia event where his paintings, artwork, comics trips as well as his Jamaïque sur la Piste du Reggae photo exhibition and video footage were shown before his own reggae show.

In 2008–2009 he produced the Asmara All Stars Eritrea's Got Soul (released in 2010) album in Eritrea, also playing on several songs. The album gathers some of the best musicians and singers from eight ethnic groups, including Dehab Faytinga, Sara Teklesenbet, Mahmoud Ahmed Amr, Temasgen Yared, Ibrahim Goret and Adam Faid Amr. The album gets a warm welcome in the press as well as the radio: "If you like the Ethiopian soul-funk sound of the early 1970s, you should find much to enjoy in this contemporary take on it. Eritrea is Ethiopia's neighbour and many of the country's musicians actually contributed to those classic recordings. The main difference with this contemporary project is the influence of Jamaican reggae. But the dub elements fold perfectly into the sinuous Ethiopian grooves – as our own Dub Colossus have already demonstrated. Vibrant, heady and sensuous stuff" (The Independent, London, October 2010). Two album release party shows, including one in the Opera House, take place in Asmara in October 2010.

In November 2010 Volume 1 of Best of Best, an anthology of rock magazine Best to which he was a major contributor, was published. The 320 pages book was conceived, coordinated and edited by Blum with the support of the original team including Sacha Reins, Patrick Eudeline and Francis Dordor, who wrote a tribute to the late editor Christian Lebrun. As part of the Festival des Cultures Juives de Paris in June 2011 he spoke on the theme "Bob Marley, culture Rastafari et Judaïsme" in the Paris 4 Town Hall. In 2011 Bruno Blum also translated Kim Gottlieb-Walker's Bob Marley and the Golden Age of Reggae photo book (published in France as Bob Marley, un portrait inédit en photos) to which director Cameron Crowe contributed.

An anthology of his Jamaican record label Human Race was released in late 2011. Essentially recorded in Jamaica, the double roots reggae CD Human Race includes The War Album with a bonus track, and features the voices of Haile Selassie I, Marcus Garvey, Gandhi, Nelson Mandela as well as Big Youth, Spectacular, Buffalo Bill, King Stitt, Brady, Annabelle Mouloudji, Joseph Cotton, Lady Manuella, Bruno Blum and several previously unreleased tracks. Illustrated by several photographs and original artwork by Blum, the CD booklet is written by renowned U.S. reggae historian Roger Steffens.

Unveiling much information and rare original music, he also edited the following Caribbean music anthologies: Jamaica, Mento 1951–1958, Bahamas, Goombay 1951–1959, Trinidad, Calypso 1939–1959 and Calypso, Jamaica - Rhythm and Blues 1956–1961, Voodoo in America - Blues Jazz Rhythm and Blues Calypso 1926–1961, Bermuda - Gombey and Calypso 1953–1960 for which he writes sizeable, standard reference booklets. In 2011 he designs and draws both ten-CD Anthologie des musiques de danse du monde (Dance Music Masters) box sets covers as well as each of the twenty album covers they contain. Five of his documented anthologies albums were co-published by national museums of France: Great Black Music Roots 1927–1962 and Jamaica - Folk Trance Possession 1939–1961, the latter being awarded the Académie Charles Cros' World Music Coup de Cœur in 2014. Slavery in America - Redemption Songs 1914–1972 includes a foreword by French Minister of Justice Christiane Taubira, author of a law compelling the French educational system to include the memory of slavery in school programs. Haiti - Vodou - Ritual Music From the First Black Republic - Folk, Trance, Possession 1937–1962 and Beat Generation 1936–1962 followed.

His contribution to the Frémeaux & Associés label also delivered several rock albums, including Elvis Presley & the American Music Heritage - 1954–1956 containing both Elvis' versions as well as all of the original versions of the songs he recorded; The Indispensable Bo Diddley 1955–1960 and many others. His Caribbean series are perhaps his most significant reissue work, documenting and making available to the public rare foundation recordings of most Caribbean islands including the Virgin Islands, Jamaica, Trinidad, Bermuda, Bahamas, Cuba, Dominican Republic, Haiti, etc.

As more audio and ethnomusicologic analysis contributions to CD Box sets for major, national museums exhibitions took place (including Beat Generation at Centre Pompidou and The Color Line at Musée du Quai Branly, both in 2016), Blum was granted a foreword by Paul McCartney for his 2016 book De Viandard à Végane. He also played several shows with his new vegan group Cabaret Végane formed in 2015, featuring young female singer Gojy Gojy, who stars in the Clémentine est végane video, to which artists Mandryka, Pascal Le Gras and Invader (artist) contributed. An English version of the song was also issued. Both were successful on Facebook.

In 2017 Bruno Blum ran for MP in the French General Elections (for the Parti Animaliste) and obtained 1,36% of the votes in the Paris district of Le Marais. In January until March 2018, his three-CD collection devoted to the history of avant-garde music in the twentieth century created an opportunity for the Frémeaux Gallery to put together an exhibition about avant-garde visual arts, as well as a conference by Blum on the topic. Blum translated three books that year: Roger Steffens' definitive Bob Marley biography, Norman Mailer's Hipster, street artist Invader's Invasion Los Angeles for which he also wrote a four-page introduction. He contributed to several of his fellow artist friend Invader's books in the following decade. His instrumental dub album Sophisticated Love partly recorded and mixed in Jamaica was issued in 2019.

=== 2020s ===
Blum also translated bluesman Robert Johnson's award-winning biography Up Jumped the Devil in 2020. He published two vegan humor, cartoon books, showing once again an ability to deal with entirely different subjects. On a different note, his major history book of 2021 Les Musiques des Caraïbes echoes his fine African-American cults-inspired Culte album, which was recorded in several African countries, Yemen, Jamaica and France. A Caribbean music anthology also entitled Les Musiques des Caraïbes was awarded a Prix de l'Académie Charles Cros in 2021. A new album entitled Le Cœur à gauche, le fric à droite (partially recorded in Jamaica on the Marilou Reggae sessions with Horsemouth Wallace and Flabba Holt) was released on bandcamp.com. It includes music recorded with Coxsone Dodd, Flabba Holt, Sticky, Chico Chin and Horsemouth Wallace, The Wailers and Sly & Robbie in Jamaica, and Manu Dibango's musicians in Cameroon as well as some French musicians in Paris. The covid crisis inspired Blum to publish a humorous cartoon book in which he condemns a totalitarian, downward slide that has also led him to move to the countryside in the South West of France where he formed an acoustic trio, Bruno Blum et ses Amis (upright bass and percussion, acoustic guitar) playing his own French songs. In 2023 Blum was sued by the French Hunters National Federation president Willy Schraen for a caricature published in his satirical cartoon book Humour Végane Extrémiste, resulting in a trial won by the artist. A new CD Les Moustiques contains a hilarious, light song about mosquitoes. Following Soul Revolution, a major Bob Marley biography covering the 1967-1972 period they reissued together, co-authored by world-renowned specialists Roger Steffens and Leroy Jodie Pierson, in 2025 his 500-page book Caraïbes/États-Unis – du Calypso au Ska" and the pertaining CD box set of the same name obtained plenty media attention. They show the round trip influences between the much overlooked Caribbean music and the USA. A twenty-episode, erudite podcast Le rap est né aux Caraïbes was broadcast by France Télévisions radio station La Première Musique in 2025. An autobiographical essay, Rock In The City tells the story of his early years playing music and meeting such stars as Mick Jagger, Paul McCartney, Lou Reed, Fela Kuti, John Lydon, The Clash, Keith Richard and many more. A hilarious, well-written 'gonzo styled' book, it received much appreciation.

Blum also exhibited his fine art at a major Abbaye de Chancelade exhibition with 55 other artists in September 2026. He keeps recording and performing regularly in the South West of France.

== Discography ==
=== Albums ===
- Bruno Blum (New Rose, 1990)
- Sexy Frogs: Sexy Frogs (Ménilmontant International, 1993)
- Nuage d'Éthiopie (Culture Press, 2001)
- Think Différent (Culture Press, 2002)
- Amala & Blum: Welikom 2 Lay-Gh-Us! (55/BMG, 2003, bandcamp.com)
- Cabaret Végane (Ménilmontant International, 2016)
- Rock n Roll Deluxe (Ménilmontant International, 2017)
- Culte (Ménilmontant International, 2017)
- Dub De Luxe: Sophisticated Love (Ménilmontant International, 2019)
- Le cœur à gauche, le fric à droite (Ménilmontant International, 2023)

(all albums can be listened to on brunoblum.bandcamp.com )

=== Singles ===
- With Private Vices (in 1979): Total Control/Paris 84 (45 rpm single, Shattered! Records)
- Bruno Blum: Des Couleurs (vinyl, Black Records, Jamaica, 1989)
- Bruno Blum: Ça bouge (sur la place Rouge) (vinyl, New Rose Records, France, 1989)
- Bruno Blum: L'histoire de ma guitare (vinyl, New Rose Records, France, 1990)
- Bruno Blum: Et moi et moi etc. (CD, Pense à Moi/EMI Music France, 1997)
- Bruno Blum: War (Human Race Records, Jamaica, 1997)
- Bruno Blum & Dub De Luxe: Si je reste (CD, Scalen, France, 1999)
- Bruno Blum: Should I Stay or Should I Go (vinyl, DeLuxe Records, Jamaica, 2002)
- Bruno Blum: Zazie et le zazou (feat. King Stitt) (vinyl, Human Race Records, Jamaica, 2002)
- Doc Reggae: Guerre [feat. The Wailers) (vinyl, Rastafari Records/Patate, EEC, 2008)
- Bruno Blum et ses Amis: Les Moustiques (CD, Cat Records, 2024)

=== Compilations ===
- With Les Manches (in 1982): These Boots Are Made for Walking on the Week End à Nice album (Black and White 1983)
- With Les Amours (in 1984): La Tentation (elle est dans ton cœur) (adapted from Lou Reed's Temptation Inside Your Heart) on the Romances 85 album (Romances 1985)
- With the Wailers (in 1996): "War" and "Guerre" on "The War Album" (Rastafari 2001), a Human Race (Jamaica 1997) 45 rpm single, and a Rastafari (Europe 2009) 45 rpm single.
- With Dub De Luxe (in 2003): Viens fumer un p'tit joint on the Libérez Marie-Jeanne, Tolérance Double Zéro Volume III album (Productions Spéciales, 2003)
- With the Revolutionaries (in 2002): Lola rastaquouère (English Version) on the Serge Gainsbourg : Aux Armes et Cætera - Dub Style album (Mercury, 2003)

=== Production ===
- Annabelle Mouloudji: La Bombe Glacée (brunoblum.bandcamp.com), 1999
- The War Album featuring the voices of Haile Selassie I, Bob Marley, the Wailers, Big Youth, Buffalo Bill and Bruno Blum (Rastafari Records, 2001; brunoblum.bandcamp.com)
- King Stitt: Zoot Suit Hipster (vinyl single, Human Race 2002)
- Big Youth/Spectacular and the voice of Marcus Garvey: Marcus Garvey (12-inch 4-track single, Human Race, 2002; brunoblum.bandcamp.com)
- Bob Marley and The Wailers: Freedom Time (mix of 1968 recordings and booklet notes, JAD 2003)
- Serge Gainsbourg : Dub Style (promo CD album, Mercury, 2003)
- Serge Gainsbourg : Aux Armes Et Cætera (Mercury, 2003)
- Serge Gainsbourg : Mauvaises Nouvelles Des Étoiles (Mercury, 2003)
- Nada: À l'Olympic (live recording, Ménilmontant International, 2003)
- Nada: Ultrash (Ménilmontant International, 2004)
- Serge Gainsbourg : Gainsbourg... et Cætera: Enregistrement Public au Théatre Le Palace (Mercury, 2006)
- Joseph Cotton: Conflicts (vinyl single Rastafari, 2008)
- Haile Selassie I, Bob Marley, the Wailers, Big Youth, Doc Reggae, Buffalo Bill : War (vinyl 10", Rastafari, 2010; brunoblum.bandcamp.com)
- Spectacular, Big Youth and the voice of Marcus Garvey : Marcus Garvey (vinyl 10", Rastafari, 2010; brunoblum.bandcamp.com)
- The Asmara All Stars: Eritrea's Got Soul (Out Here, 2010)
- Human Race featuring the voices of Haile Selassie I, Marcus Garvey, Gandhi, Nelson Mandela, Big Youth, Spectacular, Buffalo Bill, King Stitt, Brady, Annabelle Mouloudji, Joseph Cotton, Lady Manuella and Bruno Blum (double CD Rastafari/Patch Work, 2011)
- Yaoundé All Stars : Cameroon's Got Soul (bbrunoblum.bandcamp.com, 2011)
- Gainsbourg and the Revolutionaries (Mercury, 2015) (3-CD Super DeLuxe edition)
- Gainsbourg in Dub (Mercury, 2015) (3-CD Super DeLuxe edition, includes photographs and drawings by Bruno Blum)
- Dub De Luxe: Sophisticated Love (brunoblum.bandcamp.com, 2019) (Jamaican roots reggae dub)

== Bibliography ==
=== Books ===
Aside from his songs, booklet notes, writings for Best, Rock & Folk, Les Inrockuptibles, Actuel, Hara-Kiri, Nova Magazine, Bruno Blum has published several books, often illustrated by his own artwork and photographs:

In French:

- Le Reggae (Librio 2000. Revised, augmented and illustrated edition: Le Castor Astral 2010, 2021)
- Lou Reed - Electric Dandy (Biography. Le Serpent à Plumes 2001. Updated and illustrated edition with photos by Bob Gruen: Hors Collection 2008. Final, complete edition: Le Castor Astral 2014. Czech edition: Volvox Globator 2014)
- Couleurs reggae (photo portfolio, Tana 2001)
- Bob Marley, le reggae et les rastas (Hors Collection 2004. Revised edition, augmented with a discography, foreword by Tiken Jah Fakoly: Hors Collection 2010)
- Le Ragga (Hors Collection 2005)
- John Lennon (Biography. Hors Collection 2006)
- Punk, Sex Pistols, Clash et l'explosion punk (Hors Collection 2007)
- Cultures Cannabis (Scali 2007)
- Jamaïque, sur la piste du reggae (Scali 2007) (narrative, photos and travel drawings)
- De l'art de savoir chanter, danser et jouer la bamboula comme un éminent musicien africain (Scali 2007) (A guide and essay on African music)
- Les 100 plus grands tubes du reggae à télécharger (Fedjaine 2008)
- Le Rap est né en Jamaïque (Le Castor Astral 2009)
- Reggae Vinyls (Stéphane Bachès 2012, a collection of mostly Jamaican vinyl record sleeves. Éditions du Layeur 2017: new edition, twice as big as the first one)
- Shit! Tout sur le cannabis (First 2013)
- Serge Gainsbourg : Gainsbourg and the Revolutionaries (Super DeLuxe 10" book, 3 CDs, Mercury, 2015)
- Serge Gainsbourg : Gainsbourg in Dub (Super DeLuxe 10" book, 3 CDs, Mercury, 2015)
- De Viandard à végane (Mama Éditions 2016, with a foreword by Paul McCartney)
- Jimmy Cliff - The Harder They Come (Éditions GM 2017, includes 160 previously unpublished pictures and a DVD of the original film)
- Les Musiques des Caraïbes [tome 1 "du vaudou au calypso"] (Le Castor Astral 2021, with forewords by Roger Steffens and Christiane Taubira)
- Bob Marley & The Wailers 1967-1962 - Soul Revolution - La discographie discographique par les historiens du reggae (Frémeaux et Associés, 2024) co-written by Roger Steffens and Leroy Jodie Pierson.
- Caraïbes/États-Unis - du calypso au ska (Frémeaux et Associés/Musée du Quai Branly-Jacques Chirac, 2025) Foreword by Christiane Taubira.
- Rock in the city (Dandelion, 2026) Foreword by Bernard Loupias.

In Czech:

- Lou Reed - Electric Dandy (Biography. Czech edition: Volvox Globator 2014)

Most of Bruno Blum's books are illustrated by some of his artwork and/or photographs.

=== As an artist and script writer ===
- Motörhead - Rock Commando (Motörhead, 1980) [Comic book, UK, with Klaus. Second edition as part of the Super Deluxe edition of Motörhead's album Ace of Spades (BMG 2020).
- Madness - Nutty Boys Comix #1 (Madness, 1981) [Comic book, UK, with Spike and Dave Mitchell]
- Manga Comix n° 1 : Radasse la Grosse Pouffiasse (Ménilmontant International, 2015) [Adult comic book, art & scenario]
- Manga Comix n° 2 : Humour Végane Intégriste Bête et Méchant (Ménilmontant International, 2015) [Art & scenario]
- Carnets exceptionnels de mes voyages (Magellan 2017) (travel book illustrations and text)
- Rock and roll comics (Tartamudo 2019) (autobiographic novel and fiction)
- Humour végane extrémiste (À Base de Plantes 2021, bruno-blum.com) (cartoons and comics)
- Mort aux antivax (À Base De Plantes 2022, bruno-blum.com) (cartoons and comics)
- La Bible des Khmers verts herbivores (À Base de Plantes 2022, bruno-blum.com)
- À Base de Plantes #0 - Chassons les chasseurs (À Base de Plantes 2023, bruno-blum.com)(texts, cartoons and comics)
- À Base de Plantes #1 - Abattons les abattoirs (À Base de Plantes 2023, bruno-blum.com)(texts, cartoons and comics)
- À Base de Plantes #2 - Mort au matador (À Base de Plantes 2024, bruno-blum.com)(texts, cartoons and comics)
- À Base de Plantes #3 - Sabotez une chasse à courre (À Base de Plantes 2024, bruno-blum.com)(texts, cartoons and comics)
- À Base de Plantes #4 - Paul Watson est libre ! (À Base de Plantes 2025, bruno-blum.com) (texts, cartoons and comics)
- Des nouvelles de Dordogne - Anthologie de nouvelles (Littérature, Art et Culture en Périgord - LAC Éditions)(20 illustrations)

=== Contributions as an artist ===
- L'Abécédaire de rien de ce §#ç&%$ de monde du « rock » (Autour du Livre 2007) by Pascal Samain [illustrations].
- Too Much Class... Dogs, l'histoire (La Belle Saison, 2013) by Catherine Laboubée [includes a comic book story by Blum].
- Mystère Monk (Robert Laffont 2022) by Franck Médioni [includes a double page artwork portrait of Thelonious Monk]
- Des nouvelles de Dordogne (Littérature, Art et Culture en Périgord LAC Éditions)(20 illustrations)

=== Translations ===
- Sur la route avec Bob Marley, un chevalier blanc à Babylone by Mark Miller (Bob Marley's stage manager in 1978–1980)(Scali 2007. Revised, augmented and illustrated edition: Le Castor Astral 2010). Introduction, translation, iconography, Marley biography and various added texts by Bruno Blum.
- Bob Marley l'Africain (Scali 2008) by Adebayo Ojo, introduction and translation by Bruno Blum.
- Bob Marley, un portrait inédit en photos (Hors Collection 2011) by Kim Gottlieb-Walker, Jeff Walker, Roger Steffens and Cameron Crowe.
- Hipsters (Castor Astral 2017) by Norman Mailer, introduction, translation and illustrations by Bruno Blum.
- So Much Things to Say - L'histoire orale de Bob Marley (Robert Laffont 2018) by Roger Steffens. Translation and footnotes. Foreword by Linton Kwesi Johnson.
- Et le diable a surgi - la vraie vie de Robert Johnson (Castor Astral 2020) by Bruce Conforth and Gayle Dean Wardlow. Foreword and two illustrations also by Bruno Blum.
- Rencontres avec des musiciens remarquables - The Seekers (Castor Astral, 2022) by John Densmore.

=== Contributions ===
In French:

- Seventies Graffiti (1993), special issue of Best, le mensuel du rock.
- Best of Blues (1994), special issue of Best, le mensuel du rock.
- Best of Reggae (1994), special issue of Best, le mensuel du rock, edited by Bruno Blum, with contributions by Florent Droguet, Mehdi Boukhelf, Christian Eudeline, Patrick Eudeline, Blaise Ndjehoya, Jean-Pierre Boutellier, Pascale Geoffrois, Awal Mohamadou, Hélène Lee, Steve Barrow and Roger Steffens.
- Le Siècle rebelle, dictionnaire de la contestation au XXe siècle (Larousse 1999) edited by Emmanuel de Waresquiel.
- Nova Collector, a special issue magazine devoted to Bob Marley, edited by Bruno Blum, with contributions by Léon Mercadet (the magazine included a CD of Punky Reggae Party and the previously unreleased Is This Dub).
- Le Dictionnaire du rock (Robert Laffont 2000) (contribution: 14% of the texts, edited by Michka Assayas)
- Exodus - L'histoire du retour des Rastafariens en Éthiopie (by Giulia Bonacci, Scali 2008)
- Rock Critics (Don Quichotte, 2010).
- Best of Best, tome 1, 1968–1979 (Le Castor Astral, 2010), an anthology of Best, le mensuel du rock. Conception, coordination and editing: Bruno Blum
- Le Nouveau dictionnaire du rock (Robert Laffont 2014) (contribution: 14% of the texts, edited by Michka Assayas)
- Gilles Verlant (Lamiroy 2019)
- Invader in Conversation With Hans Ulrich Obrist by Invader (artist) (French and English, Heni, 2024), rewriting and footnotes (French text).

In English:

- Rebel Music (Genesis Publications, Guildford, Surrey, UK, 2004) by Kate Simon.
- Invasion Los Angeles by Invader (artist) (Control P Editions, 2018), introduction and English version.
- Invader in Conversation With Hans Ulrich Obrist by Invader (artist) (French and English, Heni, 2024), rewriting and footnotes (French section).
- Les Mots de la musique, 222 musiciens du XXe siècle par 222 écrivains under the supervision of Franck Médioni (Fayard, 2024).

=== CD booklets ===
Nearly all of the following albums were also produced by Bruno Blum, as new productions or as reissues.

- The Very Best of Jamaica (Trojan 1990)
- The Stray Cats Best Of 20/20 (Arista BMG 1993)
- Omar Pene Intégration africaine (Syllart 1996)
- Woya L'Indispensable (Syllart 1996)
- Original Stalag 17-18 and 19 (Techniques 1985-Virgin France 1998)
- Buffalo Bill Ghetto Youth Unite (Music Room-Culture Press 2001)
- The Asmara All Stars – Eritrea's Got Soul (Out Here, 2010) [in English]
- Bill Haley Live in Paris 14-15 Octobre 1958 (Frémeaux & Associés 2017)

In both English and French: The Complete Bob Marley & the Wailers 1967–1972 series in partnership with Leroy Jodie Pierson and Roger Steffens:

- Bob Marley & the Wailers, Rock to the Rock (Jad-Pense à Moi 1997)
- Bob Marley & the Wailers, Selassie Is the Chapel (Jad-Pense à Moi 1997)
- Bob Marley & the Wailers, The Best of the Wailers (Jad-Pense à Moi 1997)
- Bob Marley & the Wailers, Soul Rebels (Jad-Pense à Moi 1997)
- Bob Marley & the Wailers, Soul Revolution Part II (Jad-Pense à Moi 1997)
- Bob Marley & the Wailers, More Axe (Jad-Pense à Moi 1997)
- Bob Marley & the Wailers, Keep on Skanking (Jad-Pense à Moi 1998)
- Bob Marley & the Wailers, Satisfy my Soul Jah Jah (Jad-Pense à Moi 1998)
- Bob Marley & the Wailers, Freedom Time (Jad-55 2002)
- Bob Marley & the Wailers, Soul Adventurer (Jad-55 2002)
- Bob Marley & the Wailers, Jungle Dub (Jad 2002)
- Bill Haley Live in Paris 14–15 Octobre 1958 (Frémeaux & Associés 2017)

Please make a note that most of the extensive Frémeaux & Associés CD booklets listed below (both in English and French) are available online on the Frémeaux & Associés site.

Caribbean series:

- Dance Music Masters: Calypso (Frémeaux et Associés 2011)
- Harry Belafonte, Calypso, Mento & Folk 1956–1957 (Frémeaux et Associés 2009)
- Jamaica - Roots of Rastafari, Mystic Music from Jamaica - Folk, Trance, Possession 1939–1961 (Frémeaux & Associés/Musée du Quai Branly 2013) [awarded Prix de l'Académie Charles Cros "Coup de Cœur Musiques du Monde" 2013]
- Jamaica - Mento 1951–1958 (Frémeaux et Associés 2010)
- Jamaica - Rhythm & Blues 1956–1961 (Frémeaux et Associés 2012)
- Jamaica - Jazz 1931–1962 (Frémeaux et Associés 2016)
- Bahamas - Goombay 1951–1959 (Frémeaux et Associés 2011)
- Trinidad - Calypso 1939–1959 (Frémeaux et Associés 2011)
- Bermuda - Gombey & Calypso 1953–1960 (Frémeaux et Associés 2012)
- Virgin Islands - Quelbe & Calypso 1956–1960 (Frémeaux et Associés 2013)
- Dominican Republic - Merengue 1949–1962 (Frémeaux & Associés 2014)
- Haiti - Meringue & Konpa 1952–1962 (Frémeaux & Associés 2015)
- Haiti - Vodou - Ritual Music From the First Black Republic - Folk, Trance, Possession 1937–1962 (Frémeaux & Associés/Musée du Quai Branly 2016)
- Cuba - Jazz, Jam Sessions, Descargas 1956–1961 (Frémeaux & Associés 2018)
- Cuba - Son, The Afro-Cuban Founding Recordings 1926–1962 (Frémeaux & Associés 2019)
- Cuba - Santería, Folk, Trance, Possession, Mystic Music From Cuba 1939-1962 (Frémeaux & Associés/Musée du Quai Branly 2021)
- Les Musiques des Caraïbes, du vaudou au ska (Frémeaux & Associés 2021) [awarded Prix de l'Académie Charles Cros "Coup de Cœur Musiques du Monde" 2022]
- Puerto Rico - Plena, Bomba, Mambo, Guaracha, Pachanga 1940-1962 (Frémeaux & Associés 2022)
- Sélection de Bruno Blum - Caraïbes/États-Unis - du calypso au ska (Frémeaux et Associés/Musée du Quai Branly 2025)
- Cuba - Cha Cha Chá 1950-1962 (Frémeaux et Associés, 2026)

America series:

- Voodoo in America - Blues Jazz Rhythm and Blues Calypso 1926–1961 (Frémeaux et Associés 2012)
- Africa in America - Rock, Jazz & Calypso 1920–1962 (Frémeaux et Associés 2013)
- Slavery in America - Redemption Songs 1914–1972. Foreword by Minister of Justice Christiane Taubira (Frémeaux & Associés/Musée du Quai Branly 2014)
- Cuba in America 1939–1962 (Frémeaux & Associés 2016)
- Caribbean in America 1915–1962 (Frémeaux & Associés 2017)
- Road Songs - Car Tune Classics 1942–1962 (Frémeaux et Associés 2013)
- Elvis Presley & The American Music Heritage - 1954–1956 (Frémeaux et Associés 2012)
- Elvis Presley & The American Music Heritage vol. 2 - 1956–1958 (Frémeaux et Associés 2012)
- Electric Guitar Story 1935–1962 (Frémeaux & Associés 2014)
- Rock Instrumentals Story 1934–1962 (Frémeaux & Associés 2014)
- Race Records - Black Rock Music Forbidden on U.S. Radio 1942–1955 (Frémeaux & Associés 2015)
- Beat Generation - Hep Cats, Hipsters & Beatniks 1936–1962 (Frémeaux & Associés/Centre Pompidou 2016)
- The Color Line - African American artists and segregation 1916–1962 (Frémeaux & Associés/Musée du Quai Branly 2016)
- Klezmer - American Recordings 1909–1952 (Frémeaux & Associés 2021)

Roots series:

- Jamaica - USA - Roots of Ska - Rhythm & Blues Shuffle 1942–1962 (Frémeaux et Associés 2013)
- Roots of Punk Rock Music 1926–1962 (Frémeaux & Associés 2013)
- Great Black Music Roots 1927–1962 (Frémeaux & Associés/Cité de la Musique Paris 2014)
- Roots of Soul 1928–1962 (Frémeaux & Associés 2014)
- Roots of Funk 1947–1962 (Frémeaux & Associés 2015)
- New Orleans Roots of Soul 1941–1962 (Frémeaux & Associés 2016)
- Roots of Rap 1922–1973 (Frémeaux & Associés 2026)

Indispensable series:

- The Indispensable Bo Diddley 1955–1960 (3-CD set, Frémeaux et Associés 2012)
- The Indispensable Bo Diddley 1959–1962 (3-CD set, Frémeaux et Associés 2013)
- The Indispensable James Brown 1956–1961 (3-CD set, Frémeaux et Associés 2012)
- The Indispensable Gene Vincent 1956–1958 (3-CD set, Frémeaux et Associés 2013)
- The Indispensable Gene Vincent Vol. 2 1958–1962 (3-CD set, Frémeaux & Associés 2015)
- The Indispensable B.B. King 1949–1962 (3-CD set, Frémeaux & Associés 2013)
- The Indispensable Chuck Berry 1954–1961 (3-CD set, Frémeaux & Associés 2013)
- The Indispensable Eddie Cochran 1955–1960 (3-CD set, Frémeaux & Associés 2014)
- The Indispensable Roy Orbison 1956–1962 (2-CD set, Frémeaux & Associés 2014)
- The Indispensable Rockabilly 1951–1960 (3-CD set, Frémeaux & Associés 2014)
- The Indispensable Bill Haley 1948–1961 (3-CD set, Frémeaux & Associés 2015)
- The Indispensable Miriam Makeba 1955–1962 (3-CD set, Frémeaux & Associés 2015)
- The Indispensable Little Richard 1951–1962 (3-CD set, Frémeaux & Associés 2015)
- The Indispensable Joan Baez 1959–1962 (3-CD set, Frémeaux & Associés 2017)
- The Indispensable Fats Domino 1949–1962 (6-CD set, Frémeaux & Associés 2017)
- The Indispensable Jerry Lee Lewis 1956–1962 (3-CD set, Frémeaux & Associés 2018)
- The Indispensable Aretha Franklin, Intégrale 1956–1962 (2-CD set, Frémeaux & Associés 2018)
- The Indispensable Buddy Holly, 1955–1959 (3-CD set, Frémeaux & Associés 2020)
- The Indispensable Johnny Cash, 1954–1961 (3-CD set, Frémeaux & Associés 2021)
- The Indispensable Doo Wop, Vocal Groups 1934-1962 (3-CD set, Frémeaux & Associés 2024)
- The Indispensable Chet Atkins 1946-1956 (2 CD, Frémeaux & Associés 2025)
- The Indispensable Ernest Ranglin 1958-1962 (1 CD, Frémeaux & Associés 2026)

Twentieth Century series:

- Avant-Garde 1888–1970 (3-CD set, Frémeaux & Associés 2018)
- The Birth of British Rock 1948-1962 (3 CD set, Frémeaux & Associés 2022)
- The Birth of Surf Rock 1933-1962 (2-CD set, Frémeaux & Associés 2023)
- Chronological Dictionary of Rock 1945-1962 (4-CD set, Frémeaux & Associés 2024)

French/English booklet texts are online on the Frémeaux & Associés site.

- Serge Gainsbourg : Gainsbourg and the Revolutionaries (Super DeLuxe 10" book, 3 CDs, Mercury, 2015)
- Serge Gainsbourg : Gainsbourg in Dub (Super DeLuxe 10" book, 3 CDs, Mercury, 2015)

In partnership with Gilles Verlant (available in English editions):

- Serge Gainsbourg : Aux Armes et Cætera - Dub Style (Mercury, 2003)
- Serge Gainsbourg : Mauvaises Nouvelles Des Étoiles - Dub Style (Mercury, 2003)

In French:

- The Very Best of Jamaica (Trojan 1990)
- The Stray Cats Best Of 20/20 (Arista BMG 1993)
- Omar Pene Intégration africaine (Syllart 1996)
- Woya L'Indispensable (Syllart 1996)
- Buffalo Bill Ghetto Youth Unite (Music Room-Culture Press 2001)
- Bob Marley & the Wailers, Freedom Time (Jad 2002)
- Bob Marley & the Wailers, Soul Adventurer (Jad 2002)
- Bob Marley & the Wailers, Jungle Dub (Jad 2002)
- Bob Marley & the Wailers, Rebel (Jad 2003) (4 CD)
