= Initials B.B. =

Studio album by Serge Gainsbourg
- Released: June 1968
- Recorded: 1965–1968
- Studio: Fontana, London; Chappell, London; Hoche, Paris
- Genre: Orchestral pop
- Length: 31:05
- Label: Philips
- Producer: Claude Dejacques

Serge Gainsbourg chronology
Bonnie and Clyde (1968)	Initials B.B. (1968)	Jane Birkin/Serge Gainsbourg (1969)

Initials B.B. is a 1968 studio album by Serge Gainsbourg. It was originally released by Philips Records.

== Critical reception ==
Professional ratings
Review scores
Source	Rating
AllMusic	4/5 stars

In 2010, the French edition of Rolling Stone named it the 14th greatest French rock album. In 2017, Pitchfork placed it at number 117 on the "200 Best Albums of the 1960s" list. In 2019, Happy Mag named it "racy and effortlessly cool."

== Track listing ==
All tracks are written by Serge Gainsbourg.

No.	Title	Length
1.	"Initials B.B."	3:36
2.	"Comic Strip"	2:13
3.	"Bloody Jack"	2:11
4.	"Docteur Jekyll et Monsieur Hyde" (Dr Jekyll and Mr Hyde)	1:56
5.	"Torrey Canyon"	2:43
6.	"Shu Ba Du Ba Loo Ba"	2:08
7.	"Ford Mustang"	2:41
8.	"Bonnie and Clyde" (with Brigitte Bardot)	4:19
9.	"Black and White" (Noir et blanc)	2:10
10.	"Qui est in qui est out" (Who's "In" Who's "Out")	2:14
11.	"Hold Up"	2:20
12.	"Marilu"	2:34

Notes

"Docteur Jekyll et Monsieur Hyde", "Shu Ba Du Ba Loo Ba", "Qui est in qui est out" and "Marilu" recorded at Fontana Studios, London in December 1965. Originally released on EP Qui Est, In Qui Est, Out released in January 1966.
"Comic Strip", "Torrey Canyon" and "Hold Up" recorded at Chappell Studios, London in June 1967. Originally released on EP Mr. Gainsbourg released on July 8, 1967.
"Bonnie and Clyde" recorded at Hoche Studios, Paris on December 11 and 12, 1967. Originally released on EP Bonnie and Clyde released on January 2, 1968.
"Initials B.B.", "Bloody Jack", "Ford Mustang" and "Black and White" recorded at Chappell Studios, London in May 1968. Originally released on EP Initials BB released in May 1968.

== Personnel ==
Credits adapted from liner notes.

- Serge Gainsbourg – vocals
- Brigitte Bardot – vocals (8)
- Arthur Greenslade and his Orchestra – arrangement, orchestral direction (1, 3, 4, 6, 7, 9, 10, 12)
- David Whitaker – arrangement, orchestral direction (2, 5, 11)
- Michel Colombier and his Orchestra – arrangement, orchestral direction (8)
- Claude Dejacques – artistic production
- André Decamp – cover illustration

== Charts ==
Chart	Peak position
French Albums (SNEP)	181
