= Tony Thunder Smith =

American drummer

Tony "Thunder" Smith
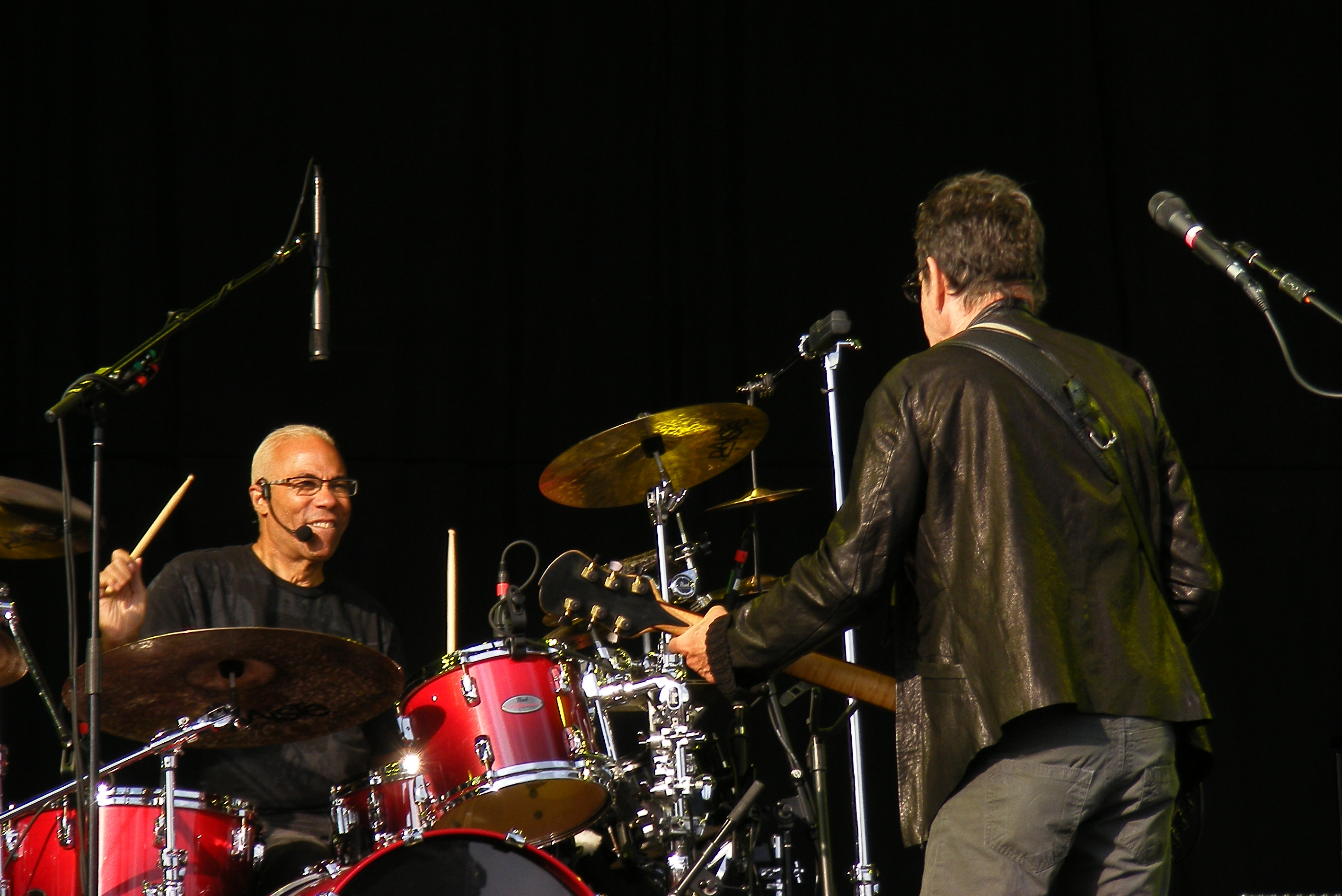
- Tony "Thunder" Smith (on drums) with Lou Reed

Background information
- Genres: Rock music, jazz fusion
- Occupations: Musician, record producer
- Instrument: Drums
- Website: tonythundersmith.com

Tony "Thunder" Smith is an American drummer best known as a member of the Lou Reed backing band. He was former member of Jan Hammer Group with whom he recorded the album Jeff Beck with the Jan Hammer Group Live, and was the drummer for French music icon Serge Gainsbourg in the eighties, and many others.

== Discography ==
- 1971 - Papa John Creach (Papa John Creach)
- 1973 - Welcome (Santana)
- 1976 - Oh Yeah? (Jan Hammer Group)
- 1977 - Melodies (Jan Hammer Group)
- 1977 - Jeff Beck with the Jan Hammer Group Live (Jan Hammer Group with Jeff Beck)
- 1978 - Black Sheep (Jan Hammer Group)
- 1978 - Electric Guitarist (John McLaughlin)
- 1979 - Electric Dreams (John McLaughlin with The One Truth Band)
- 1985 - Gainsbourg Live (Casino de Paris) (Serge Gainsbourg)
- 1986 - Charlotte for Ever (Charlotte Gainsbourg)
- 1987 - You're Under Arrest (Serge Gainsbourg)
- 1989 - Le Zénith de Gainsbourg (Serge Gainsbourg)
- 1994 - Mann to Mann (The Mann Brothers)
- 1994 - Bad Boys of the Arctic (Gary Lucas)
- 1994 - Voyage of Dreams (Jephte Guillaume & the Tet Kale Orchestra album) (Jephte Guillaume)
- 1996 - Set the Twilight Reeling (Lou Reed)
- 1998 - Perfect Night: Live in London (Lou Reed)
- 2000 - Ecstasy (Lou Reed)
- 2003 - The Raven (Lou Reed)
- 2005 - Live at the BPC (Tony "Thunder" Smith)
- 2008 - Berlin: Live at St. Ann's Warehouse (Lou Reed)
- 2011 - Cloud Maintenance (Kevin Hearn)
