= Love on the Beat =

Studio album by Serge Gainsbourg
- Released: 2 October 1984
- Recorded: June 1984
- Studio: House of Music, West Orange, New Jersey
- Genre: New wave; electronic
- Length: 37:10
- Label: Philips; Mercury (Universal Music Group)
- Producer: Billy Rush; Philippe Lerichomme

Serge Gainsbourg chronology
Mauvaises nouvelles des étoiles (1981)	Love on the Beat (1984)	Gainsbourg Live (1986)

Love on the Beat is the fifteenth studio album by French singer and songwriter Serge Gainsbourg. On this album, Gainsbourg used American musicians to achieve a funk-heavy rock sound. The album was controversial due to its very sexual lyrical content, with homosexuality and prostitution as the subject matters on many of the tracks. Perhaps the most controversial was "Lemon Incest", which was set to Frédéric Chopin's Étude No. 3 and sung as a duet with his then-13-year-old daughter Charlotte Gainsbourg.

== Critical reception ==
Professional ratings
Review scores
Source	Rating
AllMusic	3/5 stars

The French edition of Rolling Stone magazine named this album the 63rd greatest French rock album (out of 100).

== Track listing ==
All tracks are written by Serge Gainsbourg, except where noted

No.	Title	Writer(s)	Length
1.	"Love on the Beat"		8:04
2.	"Sorry Angel"		3:57
3.	"Hmm Hmm Hmm"		2:50
4.	"Kiss Me Hardy"		4:25
5.	"No Comment"		5:08
6.	"I'm the Boy"		4:28
7.	"Harley David Son of a Bitch"		3:01
8.	"Lemon Incest"	music inspired by Frédéric Chopin; arranged by Gainsbourg	5:12

== Personnel ==
Credits adapted from liner notes.

Musicians

- Serge Gainsbourg – vocals, synthesizer, arrangement
- Billy Rush – bass guitar, guitar, production, drum programming
- Larry Fast – synthesizer, synthesizer programming
- Stan Harrison – saxophone
- George Simms – backing vocals
- Steve Simms – backing vocals
- Charlotte Gainsbourg – vocals (on "Lemon Incest")

Technical

- John Rollo – recording engineering
- Nelson Ayres – engineering assistance
- Larry Alexander – mixing
- Jean Marie Guérin – mastering
- Jean-Pierre Haie – remastering
- Jean Ber – photography
- William Klein – photography
- Claude Delorme – photography
- Jacques Aubert – photography
- Philippe Lerichomme – production

== Charts ==
2022 chart performance for Love on the Beat
Chart (2022)	Peak position
Belgian Albums (Ultratop Wallonia)	119
