= Jane Birkin/Serge Gainsbourg =

Studio album by Jane Birkin and Serge Gainsbourg
- Released: June 1969
- Recorded: 1968
- Studio: Fontana, London; Chappell, London; La Gaieté, Paris
- Genre: Orchestral pop
- Length: 31:18
- Label: Fontana
- Producer: Jean-Claude Desmarty

Serge Gainsbourg chronology
Initials B.B. (1968)	Jane Birkin/Serge Gainsbourg (1969)	Histoire de Melody Nelson (1971)

Jane Birkin chronology
Jane Birkin/Serge Gainsbourg (1969)	Di doo dah (1973)

Jane Birkin/Serge Gainsbourg (also known as Je t'aime... moi non plus) is a 1969 collaborative studio album by Serge Gainsbourg and Jane Birkin. It was originally released by Fontana Records. It includes "Je t'aime... moi non plus", which reached number 1 on the UK Singles Chart.

The song "Jane B" is an adaptation of Frédéric Chopin's Fourth Prelude from Opus. 28 in E minor. The music was arranged by Arthur Greenslade.

== Critical reception ==
Professional ratings
Review scores
Source	Rating
AllMusic	4.5/5 stars
Pitchfork	8.8/10
PopMatters	8/10 stars

The album has received critical acclaim. D.M. Edwards of PopMatters stated: "The arrangements by Arthur Greenslade are excellent and there are plenty of glimpses of the experimentation which would be a feature of Gainsbourg's music," further describing the album as "sophisticated, timeless pop music."

In 2017, Pitchfork placed it at number 44 on the "200 Best Albums of the 1960s" list. Writing for Pitchfork, Cameron Cook called it "a love letter read out loud by its recipient: Every note and lyric is meant to highlight a certain aspect of Birkin's persona though Gainsbourg's lens, from her breathless delivery of every line to her heavily accented, coquettish French."

== Track listing ==
All tracks are written by Serge Gainsbourg.

No.	Title	Vocals	Length
1.	"Je t'aime... moi non plus"	Serge Gainsbourg, Jane Birkin	4:23
2.	"L'Anamour"	Serge Gainsbourg	2:17
3.	"Orang-outan"	Jane Birkin	2:28
4.	"Sous le soleil exactement"	Serge Gainsbourg	2:52
5.	"18-39"	Jane Birkin	2:39
6.	"69 Année érotique"	Serge Gainsbourg, Jane Birkin	3:21
7.	"Jane B"	Jane Birkin	3:09
8.	"Elisa"	Serge Gainsbourg	2:31
9.	"Le canari est sur le balcon"	Jane Birkin	2:20
10.	"Les sucettes"	Serge Gainsbourg	2:37
11.	"Manon"	Serge Gainsbourg	2:41

Reissue edition bonus track
No.	Title	Vocals	Length
12.	"La Chanson de slogan"	Serge Gainsbourg, Jane Birkin	2:53

== Personnel ==
Credits adapted from liner notes.

- Serge Gainsbourg – vocals
- Jane Birkin – vocals
- Arthur Greenslade – arrangement, orchestral direction
- Jean-Claude Desmarty – artistic production
- Jean D'Hughes – photography

== Charts ==
Chart	Peak position
French Albums (SNEP)	128
United States (Billboard 200)	196
