= Sam Theard =

American singer, songwriter, actor, and comedian

Background information
- Also known as: Lovin' Sam from Down in 'Bam, Lovin' Sam Theard, Spo-Dee-O-Dee, Sam Tarpley
- Born: Samuel F. Theard; October 10, 1904; New Orleans, Louisiana, U.S.
- Died: December 7, 1982 (aged 78) Los Angeles
- Occupations: Singer, songwriter, comedian
- Years active: 1920s–1970s

Samuel F. Theard (October 10, 1904 – December 7, 1982) was an American singer, songwriter, actor and comedian. He performed under the names Lovin' Sam F. Theard, Spo-Dee-O-Dee and others.

== Biography ==
Theard was born in New Orleans, Louisiana. He started working with a circus in 1923, and began performing in theatres and nightclubs. His first recordings, as Lovin' Sam from Down in 'Bam, accompanied by Tampa Red and Cow Cow Davenport, date from 1929, when he recorded one of his best-known songs, "(I'll Be Glad When You're Dead) You Rascal You," for Brunswick Records. The song was covered by several artists.

He recorded for Brunswick from 1929 to 1931. In 1930, he also recorded for the Gennett label as Sam Tarpley, and for Decca in 1934 (backed by pianist Albert Ammons). In 1936, again for Decca, he recorded "New Rubbing on That Darned Old Thing," which would later be recorded by Grateful Dead as "The Rub." In 1937, he recorded "Spo-Dee-O-Dee" for Vocalion, and a watered-down version for Decca in 1940. His last recording as Lovin' Sam was for the Bluebird label in 1938.

Using the name Spo-Dee-O-Dee, Theard performed as a comedian at the Apollo Theater in Harlem during the 1930s and 1940s, and also recorded under that name in 1941. Another well-known song, cowritten in 1942 with Louis Jordan but credited to Jordan's wife Fleecie Moore, was "Let the Good Times Roll", which became a hit several years later when Louis Jordan and His Tympany Five recorded it in 1946, one of many Theard compositions recorded by Jordan. Theard would later appear in Jordan's film Caldonia.

Along with Rudy Toombs, Theard wrote "Hard Ridin' Mama," which was recorded by Wynonie Harris in 1947. He also sang on records recorded by Tiny Parham and trumpeter Hot Lips Page, possibly on Page's "The Egg or the Hen" (1949), a song that Theard may also have cowritten. In 1950, he cowrote, and recorded with Hal Singer for Mercury Records, "Rock Around the Clock." The song was different from, but partly inspired, the later song recorded by Bill Haley. Theard cowrote several other songs, including "I've Been Around" with Henry Glover and, with pianist Teddy Brannon, "If You See My Baby," recorded by Count Basie in 1950. "Stormy Night Blues", cowritten with Henry Glover and Teddy Brannon, was recorded by Wynonie Harris in 1950. The following year, Eddie "Cleanhead" Vinson recorded "Home Boy," cowritten with Brannon and Roy Eldridge, who also recorded another Heard-Brannon composition, "Baby, What's the Matter with You?"

In the last decade of his life, Theard appeared in episodes of several television shows, including Sanford and Son and Little House on the Prairie. He died at St. Vincent Medical Center in Los Angeles in 1982 at the age of 78 from complications from a stroke.
