= Bonnie and Clyde (Serge Gainsbourg and Brigitte Bardot song) =

1968 song by Serge Gainsbourg

- 1968 Fontana Records single cover

Single by Brigitte Bardot and Serge Gainsbourg

from the album Bonnie and Clyde
- Released: January 1968
- Recorded: December 1967
- Studio: Studio Hoche, Paris
- Length: 4:10
- Label: Fontana/Phillips
- Songwriter: Serge Gainsbourg
- Producer: Claude Dejacques

Music video
- "Bonnie and Clyde" (French TV, 1968) on YouTube

"Bonnie and Clyde" is a 1968 French-language song written by Serge Gainsbourg, and performed by Gainsbourg and Brigitte Bardot. The song tells the story of the outlaw couple Bonnie and Clyde. It is based on an English language poem written by Bonnie Parker herself a few weeks before she and Clyde Barrow were shot, titled "The Trail's End". The French song was released on two albums in 1968: Gainsbourg's album Initials B.B., and Gainsbourg and Bardot's album Bonnie and Clyde.

== Cover versions ==
- American alternative rock band Luna covered the song for their 1995 album Penthouse, featuring vocals from Lætitia Sadier.
- Serge Gainsbourg's son Lulu recorded a cover with Scarlett Johansson for his album From Gainsbourg to Lulu (2011).
- Freedom Fry covered it for their EP Outlaws (2012).
- American alt-country/chamber pop/folk-rock band The Walkabouts covered the song as bonus track for their 1999 album Trail of Stars.

== Usage in other media ==
The song featured in the 2018 film A Simple Favor, starring Blake Lively and Anna Kendrick

The song plays in Oliver Assayas's Irma Vep as diegetic sound.

The song also featured in Season 6, Episode 4 of the American television series Mad Men.

The third installment of the Rush Hour franchise features the song.

The guitar riff was sampled by Renegade Soundwave for their 1994 eponymous single, looped to provide the main melody.
