= Bonnie and Clyde (Serge Gainsbourg and Brigitte Bardot album) =

Compilation album by Serge Gainsbourg and Brigitte Bardot
- Released: 1968
- Genre: French pop; French rock
- Length: 30:12
- Label: Fontana

Serge Gainsbourg chronology
Gainsbourg Percussions (1964)	Bonnie and Clyde (1968)	Initials B.B. (1968)

Brigitte Bardot chronology
B.B. (1964)	Bonnie and Clyde (1968)	Show (1968)

Bonnie and Clyde is a compilation album by Serge Gainsbourg and Brigitte Bardot. It was originally released by Fontana Records in 1968.

== Critical reception ==
Professional ratings
Review scores
Source	Rating
AllMusic	3.5/5 stars

In 2013, Spin included it on the "Top 100 Alternative Albums of the 1960s" list.

== Track listing ==
No.	Title	Writer(s)	Length
1.	"Bonnie and Clyde"	Serge Gainsbourg	4:19
2.	"Bubble Gum"	Serge Gainsbourg	1:48
3.	"Comic Strip"	Serge Gainsbourg	2:14
4.	"Un jour comme un autre"	Gérard Bourgeois, Jean-Max Rivière	2:23
5.	"Pauvre Lola"	Serge Gainsbourg	2:24
6.	"L'Eau à la bouche"	Serge Gainsbourg, Alain Goraguer	2:33
7.	"La Javanaise"	Serge Gainsbourg	2:31
8.	"La Madrague"	Gérard Bourgeois, Jean-Max Rivière	2:36
9.	"Intoxicated Man"	Serge Gainsbourg	2:40
10.	"Everybody Loves My Baby"	Jack Palmer, Spencer Williams	2:14
11.	"Baudelaire"	Serge Gainsbourg, Charles Baudelaire	2:30
12.	"Docteur Jekyll et Monsieur Hyde"	Serge Gainsbourg	2:00

== Personnel ==
Credits adapted from liner notes.

- Serge Gainsbourg – vocals (1, 3, 5, 6, 7, 9, 11, 12)
- Brigitte Bardot – vocals (1, 2, 4, 8, 10)
- Michel Colombier – orchestration (1)
- Alain Goraguer – orchestration (2, 4, 5, 6, 9, 11)
- David Whitaker – arrangement (3), direction (3)
- Harry Robinson – orchestration (7)
- Claude Bolling – orchestration (8, 10)
- Arthur Greenslade – direction (12)

== Charts ==
Chart	Peak position
US Billboard 200	12
