= Evelyn Adams =

Evelyn Adams may refer to:

- Evelyn Adams (lottery winner), American lottery winner
- Evelyn Adams (baseball) (1923–1999), shortstop in the All-American Girls Professional Baseball League
- Evelyn Adams (rower) (born 1950), Australian rower
- Eva Kotchever (1891–1943), Polish-Jewish émigré librarian and writer who published short stories as Evelyn Adams
