= Carone =

Carone is a surname. It may refer to the following notable people:

- Jim Carone (born 1981), American college baseball coach
- Juan Carlos Carone (1942–2025), Argentine footballer
- Mauricio Claver-Carone (born 1975), American political advocate
- Nicolas Carone (1917–2010), American artist
- Patricia Carone (born 1943), American politician
- Pierdavide Carone (born 1988), Italian singer-songwriter
- Walter Carone (1920–1982), Italian-French photographer
