= L'Homme à tête de chou =

Studio album by Serge Gainsbourg
- Released: 18 November 1976
- Recorded: August 16–21; September 14, 1976
- Studio: Mercury Studios, London; Paris
- Genre: French rock, art rock, spoken word
- Length: 31:24
- Label: Philips
- Producer: Philippe Lerichomme

Serge Gainsbourg chronology
Rock Around the Bunker (1975)	L'Homme à tête de chou (1976)	Aux armes et cætera (1979)

L’Homme à tête de chou is a concept album by Serge Gainsbourg, released on Philips Records in 1976.

== Concept ==
L'Homme à tête de chou (1976) is a concept album by Serge Gainsbourg. Like its predecessors Histoire de Melody Nelson (1971), Vu de l'extérieur (1973) and Rock Around the Bunker (1975), the album received little attention when it was first issued.

"L’Homme à tête de chou" tells the story of a man in his forties falling in love with a rather free-minded shampoo girl. After the narrator meets the young woman at the barber shop where she works ("Chez Max coiffeur pour hommes"), he asks her out and they begin an affair ("Ma Lou Marilou"), her solo erotic games ("Variations sur Marilou"), and ultimately about Marilou's murder by the narrator, turned jealous lover after he saw her in bed with two rockers ("Meurtre à l’extincteur", "Marilou sous la neige"), and finally his decline into madness ("Lunatic Asylum").

"Ma Lou Marilou" is inspired by a section of the first movement of Piano Sonata No. 23 in F minor, Op. 57, known as the "Appassionata" composed by Ludwig van Beethoven.

The album was inspired by the sculpture by Claude Lalanne of a man with a cabbage for a head, which Gainsbourg had purchased and which appears on the sleeve. The album cover would later inspire the cover for British Group Pulp's album Different Class (1995).

== History ==
=== Music genre ===
"Marilou Reggae" is the singer's first attempt to make a reggae song, although it's a pop song. He revisited it on his 1979 album Aux armes et cætera.

=== Show Gainsbourg / Bashung / Gallotta / Clavaizolle ===
The choreographer Jean-Claude Gallotta created a contemporary dance show for Alain Bashung, with arrangements and additional music by Denis Clavaizolle. This project, initiated in 2008, was disrupted by the death of Bashung, who was to interpret the album on stage in a version slightly modified and completed by Denis Clavaizolle (to make it longer). Denis Clavaizolle tried in late 2008 to realize a satisfactory soundtrack during meetings and discussions with Bashung, with ambiances and sonorities inspired by The Doors, Mahler, and Captain Beefheart, to allow Gallotta to achieve the choreography project which he finally presented on 12 November 2008 at the MC2 in Grenoble.

About the album, Denis Clavaizolle conceptualized the additional music and the arrangements and orchestrations as a movie soundtrack evocating tension, jealousy, sex, madness, violence all along the ballet: "je pense qu'il faut envisager cet album comme un scénario, et créer dans la musique les sentiments que l'on ressent dans le texte" ("I think this album must be seen like a scenario, and the music must reflect the feelings expressed by the words").

The cover album by Alain Bashung was issued on 7 November 2011, on Barclay Records and became his first posthumous release.

== Critical reception ==
Professional ratings
Review scores
Source	Rating
AllMusic	4/5 stars
Mojo	5/5 stars

In 2010, the French edition of Rolling Stone magazine named this album the 28th greatest French rock album.

== Track listing ==
All tracks are written by Serge Gainsbourg.

No.	Title	Length
1.	"L'Homme à tête de chou"	2:59
2.	"Chez Max coiffeur pour hommes"	1:58
3.	"Marilou Reggae"	2:11
4.	"Transit à Marilou"	1:32
5.	"Flash Forward"	2:36
6.	"Aéroplanes"	2:36
7.	"Premiers symptômes"	1:14
8.	"Ma Lou Marilou"	2:41
9.	"Variations sur Marilou"	7:40
10.	"Meurtre à l'extincteur"	0:47
11.	"Marilou sous la neige"	2:23
12.	"Lunatic Asylum"	3:21

== Personnel ==
Credits adapted from liner notes.

- Serge Gainsbourg – Vocal, jew harp, arrangement
- Alan Hawkshaw – Keyboards, arrangement

== Charts ==
Chart	Peak position
French Albums (SNEP)	85

== Certifications and sales ==
Region	Certification	Certified units/sales
France (SNEP)	Gold	100,000^{*}
^{*} Sales figures based on certification alone.
