= Rock Around the Bunker =

Studio album by Serge Gainsbourg
- Released: January 1975
- Recorded: November – December 2, 1974
- Studio: Phonogram (London, UK)
- Genre: Rock; pop
- Label: Polygram International
- Producer: Alain Hortu

Serge Gainsbourg chronology
Vu de l'extérieur (1973)	Rock Around the Bunker (1975)	L'Homme à tête de chou (1976)

Professional ratings
Review scores
Source	Rating
AllMusic	4/5 stars

Rock Around the Bunker is a 1975 studio album by French singer and songwriter Serge Gainsbourg, containing songs which combined pseudo-1950s musical arrangements with lyrics relating to Nazi Germany and World War II and drawing from Gainsbourg's experiences as a Jewish child in occupied France.

== Track listing ==
All tracks are written by Serge Gainsbourg, except where noted.

No.	Title	Length
1.	"Nazi Rock"	3:10
2.	"Tata teutonne"	2:48
3.	"J'entends des voix off"	2:05
4.	"Eva"	3:13
5.	"Smoke Gets in Your Eyes" (Otto Harbach, Jerome Kern)	3:28
6.	"Zig zig avec toi"	3:39
7.	"Est-ce est-ce si bon ?"	3:16
8.	"Yellow Star"	1:40
9.	"Rock Around the Bunker"	3:25
10.	"S.S. in Uruguay"	2:16

== Personnel ==
Credits adapted from liner notes.

- Serge Gainsbourg – vocals, piano, guitar, arrangement
- Kay Garner – vocals
- Jean Hawker – vocals
- Jim Lawless – percussion
- Brian Odgers – bass
- Alan Parker – guitar
- Judd Proctor – guitar
- Clare Torry – vocals
- Dougie Wright – drums
- Alan Hawkshaw – piano, arrangement
