= Du chant à la une !... =

Studio album by Serge Gainsbourg
- Released: 3 September 1958
- Recorded: 10, 17 June; 1, 3 July 1958
- Studio: Studio Blanqui, Paris
- Genre: Jazz
- Length: 22:47
- Label: Philips
- Producer: Denis Bourgeois

Serge Gainsbourg chronology
| Du chant à la une !... (1958) | N° 2 (1959) |

Du chant à la une !... is the debut studio album by French musician Serge Gainsbourg, released in 1958. This was the debut album for Gainsbourg, released on a 10" vinyl. The album did not do well with critics at the time of its release. However, the album did win the grand prize from the L'Academie Charles Cross in 1959.

== Track listing ==
All tracks are written by Serge Gainsbourg, except where noted

| No. | Title | Writer(s) | Length |
|---|---|---|---|
| 1. | "Le Poinçonneur des lilas" | | 2:42 |
| 2. | "La Recette de l'amour fou" | | 1:56 |
| 3. | "Douze belles dans la peau" | | 1:54 |
| 4. | "Ce mortel ennui" | | 2:54 |
| 5. | "Ronsard 58" | music: Serge Gainsbourg; lyrics: Serge Barthélémy | 1:52 |
| 6. | "La Femme des uns sous le corps des autres" | | 2:59 |
| 7. | "L'Alcool" | | 3:56 |
| 8. | "Du jazz dans le ravin" | | 2:10 |
| 9. | "Charleston les déménageurs de piano" | | 2:24 |

== Personnel ==
Credits adapted from liner notes.

- Serge Gainsbourg – vocals
- Alain Goraguer and His Orchestre – orchestra
- Paul Rovère – double bass
- Christian Garros – drums
- Michel Hausser – vibraphone
- Alain Goraguer – arrangements, conductor, piano

Technical

- Walter Carone – photography

== Charts ==
| Chart | Peak position |
|---|---|
| French Albums (SNEP) | 137 |
