= Gainsbourg Confidentiel =

Studio album by Serge Gainsbourg
- Released: 7 January 1964
- Recorded: 12–14 November 1963
- Studio: Studio D.M.S., Paris
- Genre: Jazz
- Length: 26:24
- Label: Philips
- Producer: Claude Dejacques

Serge Gainsbourg chronology
Serge Gainsbourg N° 4 (1962)	Gainsbourg Confidentiel (1964)	Gainsbourg Percussions (1964)

Gainsbourg Confidentiel is the fifth studio album by French musician Serge Gainsbourg, released in 1964. It features a minimalistic approach to jazz, with only a double bass and an electric guitar.

== Track listing ==
All tracks are written by Serge Gainsbourg, except where noted.

No.	Title	Writer(s)	Length
1.	"Chez les yé-yé"		2:29
2.	"Sait-on jamais où va une femme quand elle vous quitte"		2:02
3.	"Le Talkie-walkie"		2:02
4.	"La Fille au rasoir"		1:43
5.	"La Saison des pluies" (original by Jackie Laurence)	lyrics: Serge Gainsbourg; music: Elek Bacsik	3:27
6.	"Elaeudanla Téitéia"		1:38
7.	"Scenic Railway"		2:32
8.	"Le Temps des yoyos"		2:35
9.	"Amour sans amour"		2:02
10.	"No, No, Thanks, No"		2:31
11.	"Maxim's"		1:49
12.	"Negative Blues"		1:34

== Personnel ==
Credits adapted from liner notes.

- Serge Gainsbourg – vocals
- Michel Gaudry – double bass
- Elek Bacsik – electric guitar

Technical

- Nicolas Treatt – photography
