= L'Étonnant Serge Gainsbourg =

Studio album by Serge Gainsbourg
- Released: 3 April 1961
- Recorded: 8, 10, 14 February 1961; 6, 9, 13, 16 March 1961
- Studio: Studio Blanqui, Paris
- Genre: Jazz; French pop
- Length: 24:55
- Label: Philips
- Producer: Jean-Yves Billet

Serge Gainsbourg chronology
N° 2 (1959)	L'Étonnant Serge Gainsbourg (1961)	Serge Gainsbourg N° 4 (1962)

L'Étonnant Serge Gainsbourg is the third studio album by French musician Serge Gainsbourg, released in 1961.

== Critical reception ==
Professional ratings
Review scores
Source	Rating
AllMusic	4/5 stars

Dean McFarlane of AllMusic gave the album 4 out of 5 stars, writing: "One of his most intoxicating amalgams of jazz and pop styles, L'Etonnant Serge Gainsbourg comes highly recommended to fans of '60s French pop."

== Track listing ==
All tracks are written by Serge Gainsbourg, except where noted

No.	Title	Writer(s)	Length
1.	"La Chanson de Prévert" (original by Michèle Arnaud)		3:01
2.	"En relisant ta lettre"		2:01
3.	"Le Rock de Nerval"	music: Serge Gainsbourg; lyrics: Gérard de Nerval	1:51
4.	"Les Oubliettes"		2:28
5.	"Chanson de Maglia"	music: Serge Gainsbourg; lyrics: Victor Hugo	2:05
6.	"Viva Villa"		3:23
7.	"Les Amours perdues" (original by Juliette Gréco)		2:57
8.	"Les femmes c'est du chinois"	lyrics: Serge Gainsbourg; music: Alain Goraguer	2:32
9.	"Personne"		2:44
10.	"Le Sonnet d'Arvers"	music: Serge Gainsbourg; lyrics: Alexis Félix Arvers	1:53

== Personnel ==
Credits adapted from liner notes.

- Serge Gainsbourg – vocals
- Paul Rovère – double bass
- Christian Garros – drums
- Alain Goraguer – piano, arrangements, conductor
- Alain Goraguer et Son Orchestre – orchestra
- Barthélémy Rosso – acoustic guitar on "La Chanson de Prévert"

Technical

- Jacques Plait – executive production
- Jacques Aubert – photography
