= Point Pleasant Beach, New Jersey =

Borough in Ocean County, New Jersey, US

- Borough
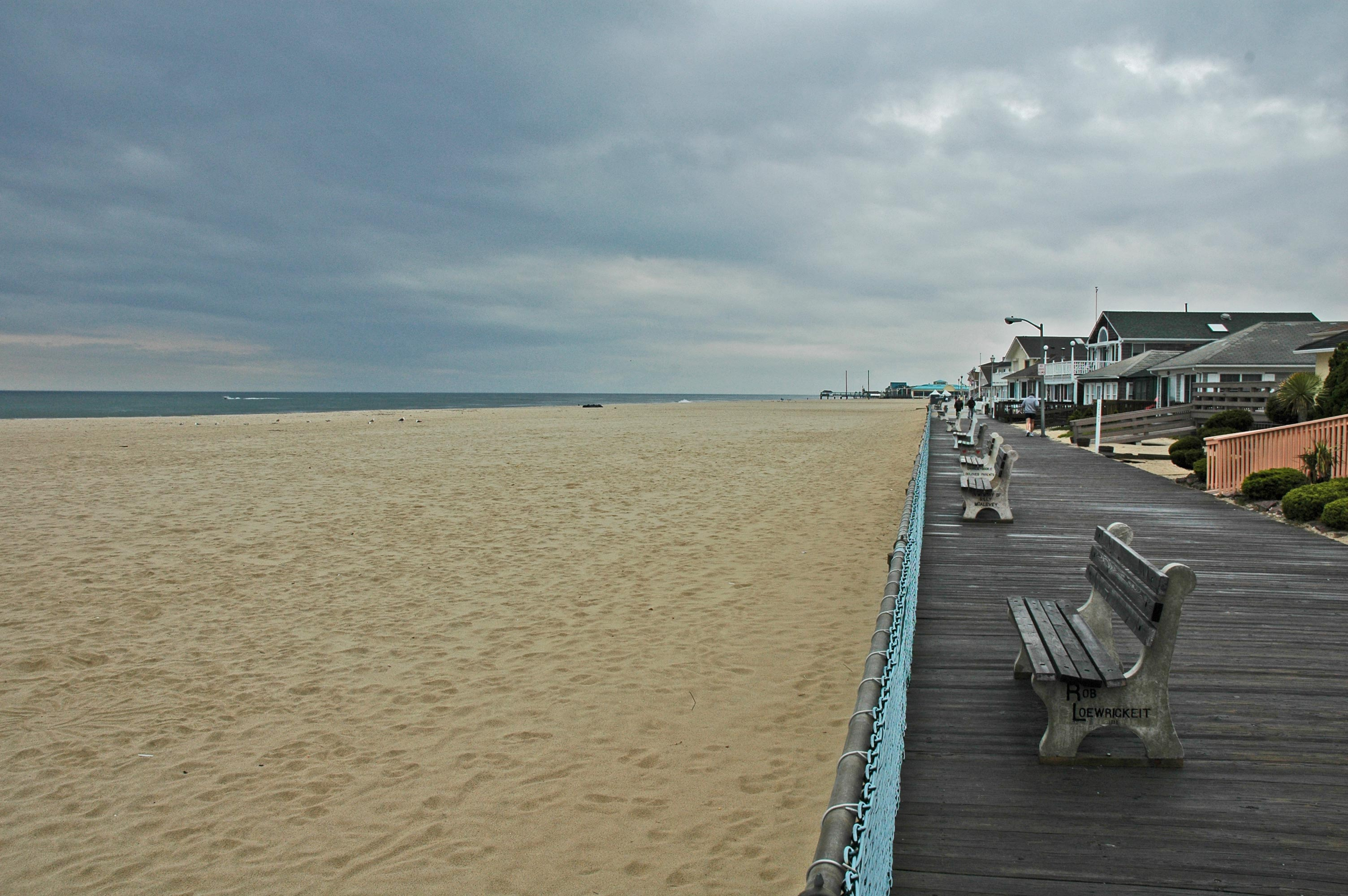
- The boardwalk fronting Point Pleasant Beach

- Seal

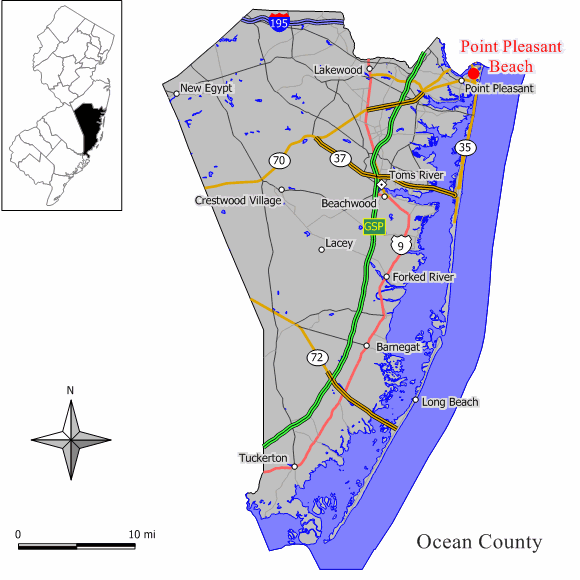
- Location of Point Pleasant Beach in Ocean County highlighted in red (right). Inset map: Location of Ocean County in New Jersey highlighted in black (left).

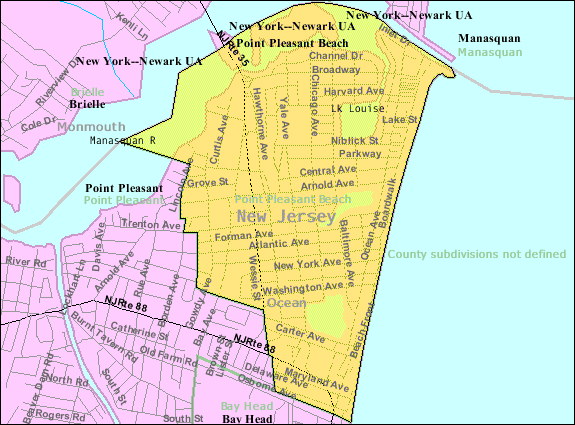
- Census Bureau map of Point Pleasant Beach, New Jersey

- Location in Ocean County Location in New Jersey Location in the United States
- Coordinates: 40.092566°N 74.045173°W
- Country: United States
- State: New Jersey
- County: Ocean
- Incorporated: May 18, 1886

Government
  - Type: Borough
  - Body: Borough Council
  - Mayor: Douglas Vitale (R, term ends December 31, 2027)
  - Administrator: Joseph A. Michigan
  - Municipal clerk: Eileen A. Farrell

Area
  - Total: 1.74 sq mi (4.51 km^{2})
  - Land: 1.42 sq mi (3.69 km^{2})
  - Water: 0.32 sq mi (0.82 km^{2}) 18.22%
  - Rank: 429th of 565 in state 19th of 33 in county
- Elevation: 7 ft (2.1 m)

Population (2020)
  - Total: 4,766
  - Estimate (2023): 4,897
  - Rank: 386th of 565 in state 15th of 33 in county
  - Density: 3,347.8/sq mi (1,292.6/km^{2})
  - Rank: 202nd of 565 in state 7th of 33 in county
- Time zone: UTC−05:00 (Eastern (EST))
  - Summer (DST): UTC−04:00 (Eastern (EDT))
- ZIP Code: 08742
- Area code: 732
- FIPS code: 3402959910
- GNIS feature ID: 885358
- Website: www.pointpleasantbeach.org

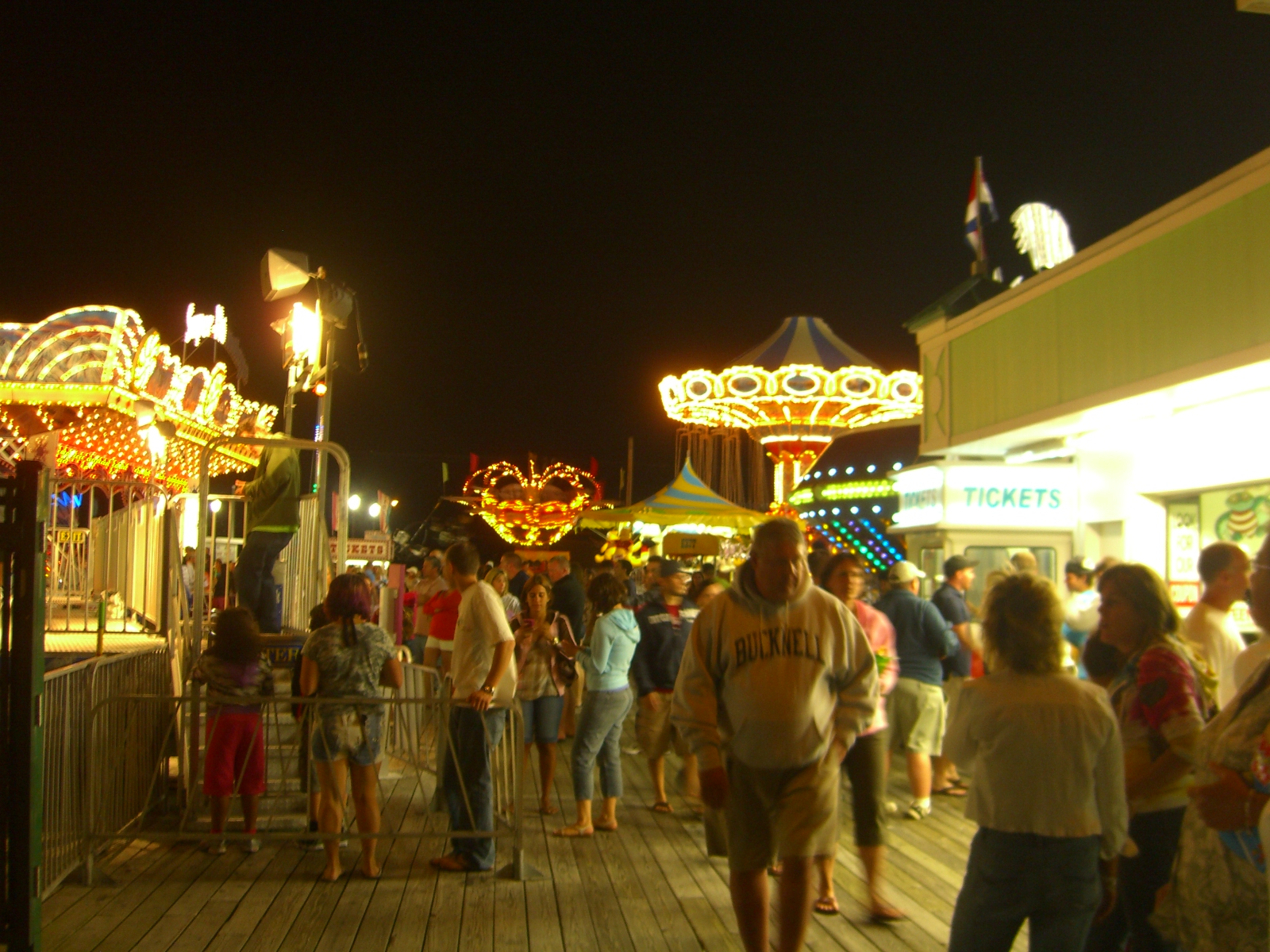
Nightlife at Jenkinson's Boardwalk

Point Pleasant Beach is a coastal borough situated on the Jersey Shore, and the northernmost community directly facing the Atlantic Ocean within Ocean County, in the U.S. state of New Jersey. It lies at the northern end of the Barnegat Peninsula, which serves as a barrier island separating Barnegat Bay from the open Atlantic Ocean. The borough's name is derived from its location.

As of the 2020 United States census, the borough's population was 4,766, an increase of 101 (+2.2%) from the 2010 census count of 4,665, which in turn reflected a decline of 649 (−12.2%) from the 5,314 counted in the 2000 census.

Point Pleasant Beach was incorporated as a borough by an act of the New Jersey Legislature on May 18, 1886, from portions of Brick Township, subject to the results of a referendum passed the previous day. Point Pleasant Beach lies immediately to the east of Point Pleasant, an entirely separate municipality within Ocean County.

The borough's boardwalk is approximately one mile long, spanning the coastline from the Manasquan Inlet at the north to New Jersey Avenue in the south. The central third of the boardwalk is largely amusement rides, the Jenkinson's Aquarium, the Jenkinson's Arcades, pizza joints, ice cream parlors, games-of-chance and miniature golf courses. There are fees of up to $10 per person age 12 or over to access the various beaches, as well as parking fees of up to $2.50 per hour or more.

The beach was ranked eighth-best in New Jersey in the "2008 Top 10 Beaches Contest" sponsored by the New Jersey Marine Sciences Consortium.

== History ==
The area that includes Point Pleasant Beach was first occupied by the Lenape Native Americans. On September 2, 1609, Henry Hudson and the crew of his ship, Half Moon, noticed the area on their way north to explore the Hudson River. Crew member Robert Juet noted in his journal, "This is a very good Land to fall with and a pleasant Land to see." The first European settlers were fisherman and farmers who first arrived in the 18th century. Summer tourism began in the early 19th century when Quaker Thomas Cook Jr. opened his farmhouse on the site of the current Antrim Elementary School to boarders, which began the trend that transformed the area into an oceanfront haven for visitors, a trend further established in the 1870 by Captain John Arnold, who built a roadway to the ocean, now known as Arnold Avenue. In 1875, he built the first bridge over the Manasquan River, linking the town to Brielle. He later convinced the Central Jersey Railroad to extend its service to Point Pleasant Beach, which it did beginning on July 3, 1880.

The Borough of Point Pleasant Beach was established on June 2, 1886.

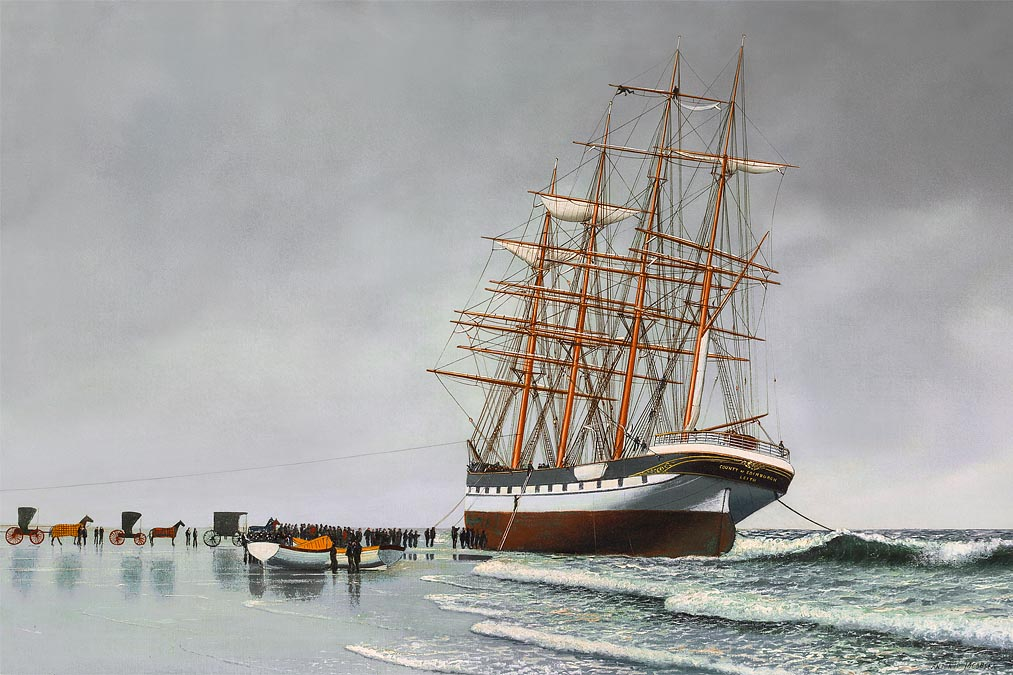
County of Edinburgh stranded on the beach, February 12–14, 1900

The 1870s was an era of major tourism expansion, driven by developers who subdivided old farms for vacation home lots. Captain Arnold devised Arnold City between Central and what was to become Arnold Avenue. In 1877, the Point Pleasant Land Company bought the old Forman Farm, 250 acres (1.0 km^{2}) on what is now Route 35 South, between Forman and Elizabeth Avenues and began selling lots. In 1878, it built the four-story, 200-guest Resort House, the largest building in town. It also began a horse-drawn trolley service to attract tourists. Other hotels were built before the turn-of-the-20th century, including the largest, the Leighton, as well as the Beacon, and Zimmerman's, though many of these, including the Resort House, burnt down, succumbed to changing tastes, or were dismantled for wood during World War II. Initially, visitors focused their attention on the Manasquan River, cedar groves and farmhouses, but their interest in the ocean led to development on the waterfront, beginning with the first beachfront pavilion on Atlantic Avenue in 1880. Ten years later, the first flimsy, portable boardwalk was built, but it washed away within two years.

The original amusement area was Clark's Landing, which opened on the Manasquan River in 1892. In 1897, the decision for privately owned beaches in Point Pleasant Beach was made when, as noted in the Council minutes of August 16, "Ownership of the Beach turned down by the Council because of the extreme cost to the Borough for maintenance." In 1915, the first permanent boardwalk was built between Philadelphia and Central Avenues, and eventually expanded along the entire length of Point Pleasant Beach, but shortened to its present length by a September 1938 hurricane that destroyed its southern portion. It evolved from a mere promenade for strolling to a more active amusement area, beginning with Charles Jenkinson's construction in the 1920s of Jenkinson's Pavilion and Swimming Pool. The boardwalk pavilion became the center of nightlife, featuring sophisticated dancing, well-known big bands, and occasional live nationally broadcast radio. Today it features a number of amusement rides, video arcades, and diverse cuisine, ranging from sausage sandwiches to sushi. Point Pleasant Beach hosts an annual Seafood Festival in September.

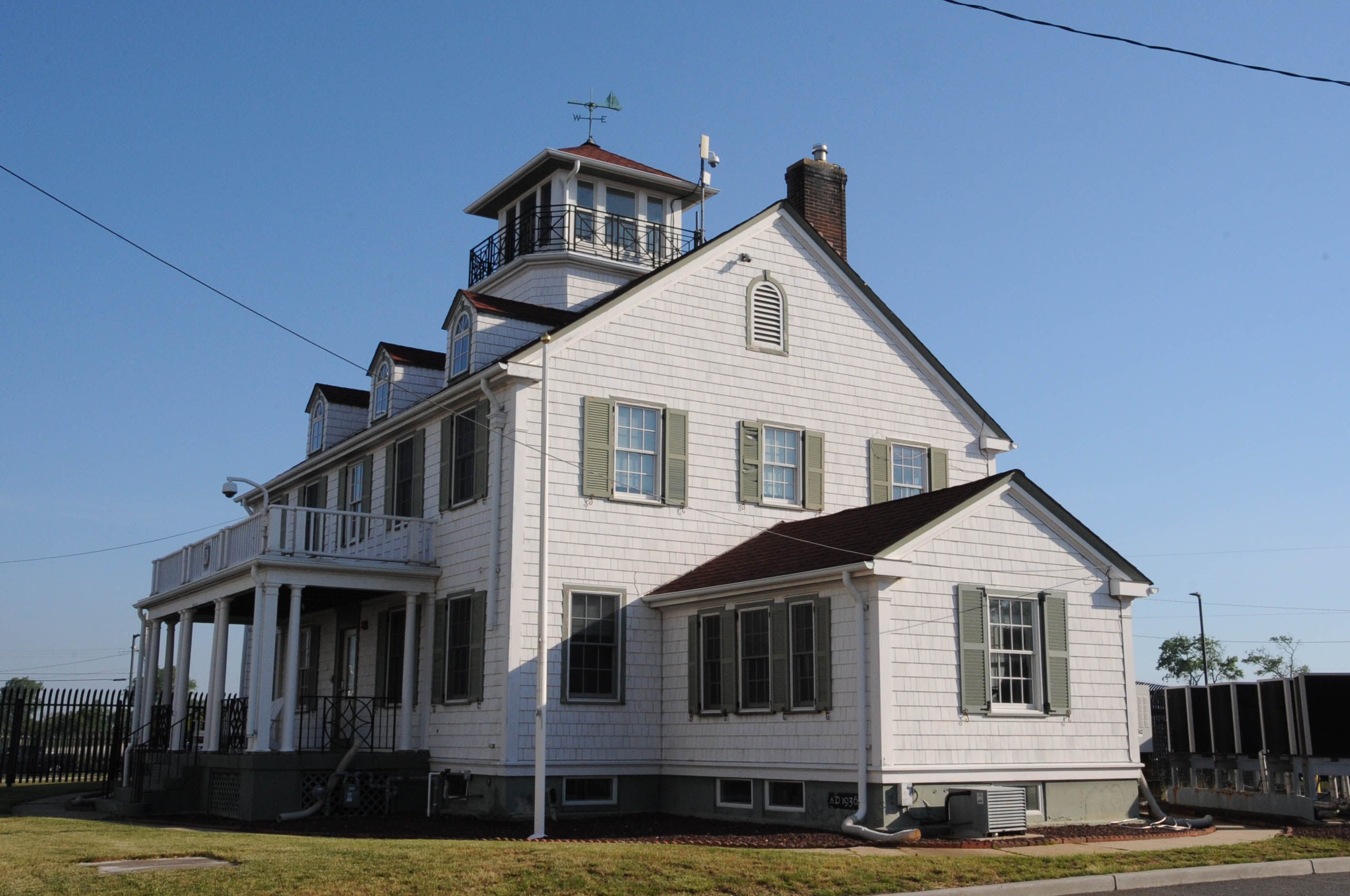
The old Coast Guard Station on Manasqan Inlet, built in 1936 and listed on the National Register of Historic Places

On February 12, 1900, the steel-hulled, Scottish barque, County of Edinburgh was blown ashore at high tide and became stranded. The event became national news when it was extensively reported in The New York Times, illustrated by a high quality photograph that became the resource for a famous painting by Antonio Jacobsen. The undamaged vessel was successfully re-floated on the spring tide of February 14 and continued on her voyage from Cape Town to New York.

In October 2012, Point Pleasant Beach and numerous other Jersey Shore communities, such as Seaside Heights and Long Beach Island, were devastated by Hurricane Sandy. Nearly 2,800 feet (850 m) of the borough's boardwalk was destroyed, with the cost of repairs estimated as up to $2 million.

After Hurricane Sandy a seawall was constructed to protect the area from future storms. In addition, the borough required residents who wished to rebuild their homes to elevate them on pilings above the height of Sandy's storm surge.

== Geography ==
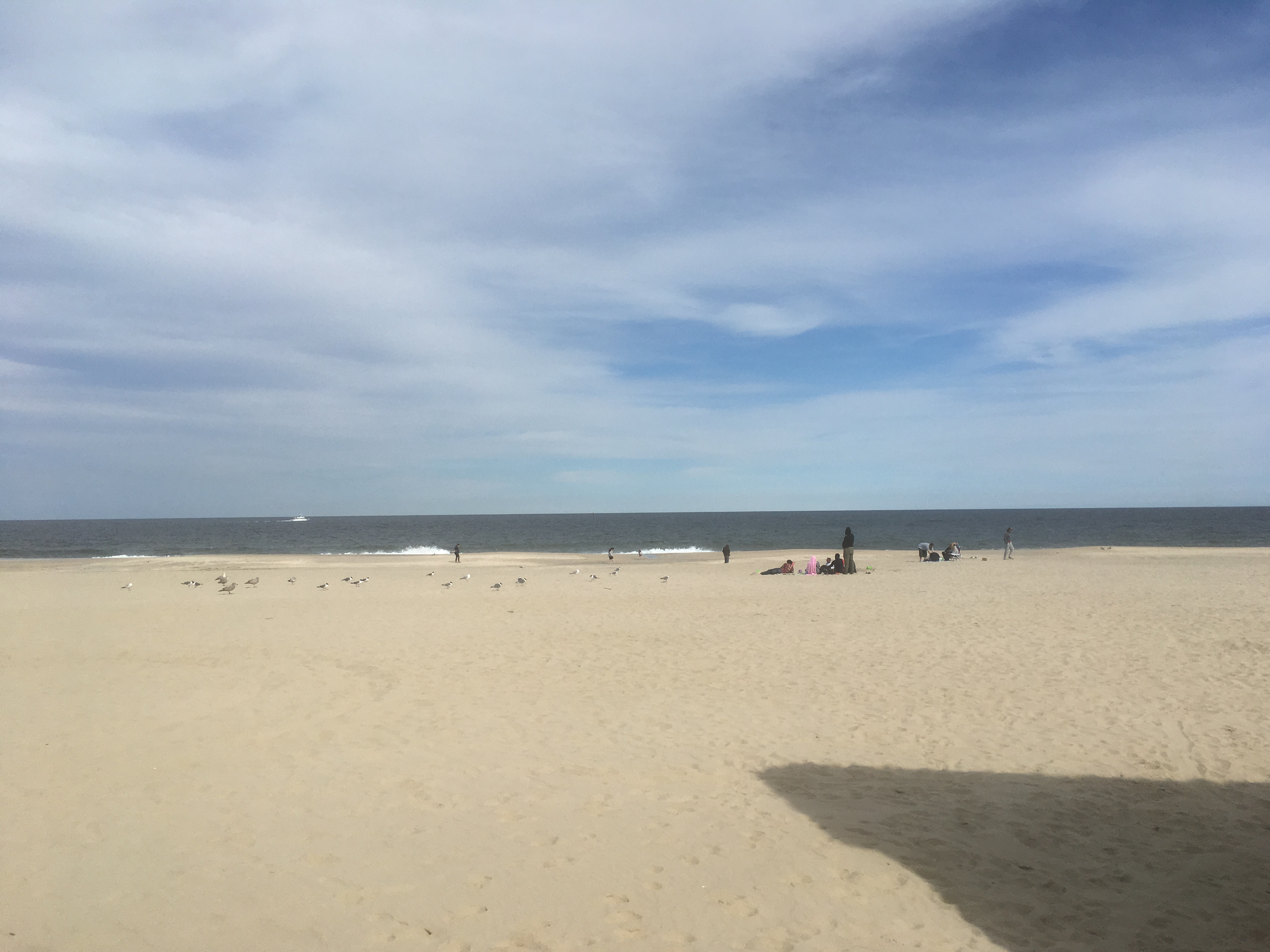
A view of the beach in Point Pleasant Beach

According to the United States Census Bureau, the borough had a total area of 1.74 square miles (4.50 km^{2}), including 1.42 square miles (3.68 km^{2}) of land and 0.32 square miles (0.82 km^{2}) of water (18.22%).

Unincorporated communities, localities and place names located partially or completely within the township include Clark's Landing, Lovelandtown and Sunshine Harbor.

The borough borders the municipalities of Bay Head and Point Pleasant in Ocean County; and both Brielle and Manasquan in Monmouth County.

== Demographics ==
Historical population
Census	Pop.	Note	%±
1900	746		—
1910	1,003		34.5%
1920	1,575		57.0%
1930	1,844		17.1%
1940	2,059		11.7%
1950	2,900		40.8%
1960	3,873		33.6%
1970	4,882		26.1%
1980	5,415		10.9%
1990	5,112		−5.6%
2000	5,314		4.0%
2010	4,665		−12.2%
2020	4,766		2.2%
2023 (est.)	4,897	▲	2.7%
Population sources: 1900–2000 1900–1920; 1900–1910 1910–1930 1940–2000; 2000 2010 2020

=== 2020 census ===
As of the 2020 census, Point Pleasant Beach had a population of 4,766. The median age was 50.2 years. 15.2% of residents were under the age of 18 and 21.6% of residents were 65 years of age or older. For every 100 females there were 106.6 males, and for every 100 females age 18 and over there were 104.8 males age 18 and over.

100.0% of residents lived in urban areas, while 0.0% lived in rural areas.

There were 2,045 households in Point Pleasant Beach, of which 20.8% had children under the age of 18 living in them. Of all households, 46.2% were married-couple households, 23.3% were households with a male householder and no spouse or partner present, and 24.8% were households with a female householder and no spouse or partner present. About 35.1% of all households were made up of individuals and 15.9% had someone living alone who was 65 years of age or older.

There were 3,397 housing units, of which 39.8% were vacant. The homeowner vacancy rate was 2.0% and the rental vacancy rate was 10.7%.

Racial composition as of the 2020 census
Race	Number	Percent
White	4,177	87.6%
Black or African American	28	0.6%
American Indian and Alaska Native	32	0.7%
Asian	57	1.2%
Native Hawaiian and Other Pacific Islander	1	0.0%
Some other race	198	4.2%
Two or more races	273	5.7%
Hispanic or Latino (of any race)	475	10.0%

=== 2010 census ===
The 2010 United States census counted 4,665 people, 1,985 households, and 1,122 families in the borough. The population density was 3,270.1 inhabitants per square mile (1,262.6/km^{2}). There were 3,373 housing units at an average density of 2,364.4 per square mile (912.9/km^{2}). The racial makeup was 92.35% (4,308) White, 0.84% (39) Black or African American, 0.15% (7) Native American, 0.84% (39) Asian, 0.02% (1) Pacific Islander, 4.52% (211) from other races, and 1.29% (60) from two or more races. Hispanic or Latino of any race were 9.02% (421) of the population.

Of the 1,985 households, 22.5% had children under the age of 18; 43.3% were married couples living together; 8.9% had a female householder with no husband present and 43.5% were non-families. Of all households, 36.0% were made up of individuals and 12.5% had someone living alone who was 65 years of age or older. The average household size was 2.30 and the average family size was 3.04.

18.9% of the population were under the age of 18, 7.2% from 18 to 24, 22.7% from 25 to 44, 33.6% from 45 to 64, and 17.5% who were 65 years of age or older. The median age was 45.7 years. For every 100 females, the population had 103.6 males. For every 100 females ages 18 and older there were 103.6 males.

The Census Bureau's 2006–2010 American Community Survey showed that (in 2010 inflation-adjusted dollars) median household income was $57,792 (with a margin of error of +/− $6,541) and the median family income was $65,402 (+/− $16,995). Males had a median income of $54,327 (+/− $12,359) versus $39,076 (+/− $6,800) for females. The per capita income for the borough was $39,250 (+/− $5,121). About 5.8% of families and 8.4% of the population were below the poverty line, including 21.0% of those under age 18 and 3.4% of those age 65 or over.

=== 2000 census ===
As of the 2000 United States census there were 5,314 people, 2,317 households, and 1,316 families residing in the borough. The population density was 3,696.0 inhabitants per square mile (1,427.0/km^{2}). There were 3,558 housing units at an average density of 2,474.7 per square mile (955.5/km^{2}). The racial makeup of the borough was 95.94% White, 0.53% African American, 0.34% Native American, 1.02% Asian, 0.02% Pacific Islander, 1.47% from other races, and 0.70% from two or more races. Hispanic or Latino of any race were 4.40% of the population.

There were 2,317 households, out of which 22.9% had children under the age of 18 living with them, 43.3% were married couples living together, 9.6% had a female householder with no husband present, and 43.2% were non-families. 36.3% of all households were made up of individuals, and 14.4% had someone living alone who was 65 years of age or older. The average household size was 2.25 and the average family size was 2.96.

In the borough the population was spread out, with 19.2% under the age of 18, 6.5% from 18 to 24, 28.6% from 25 to 44, 26.6% from 45 to 64, and 19.0% who were 65 years of age or older. The median age was 43 years. For every 100 females, there were 101.6 males. For every 100 females age 18 and over, there were 99.9 males.

The median income for a household in the borough was $51,105, and the median income for a family was $61,250. Males had a median income of $40,507 versus $37,500 for females. The per capita income for the borough was $27,853. About 5.0% of families and 6.1% of the population were below the poverty line, including 2.9% of those under age 18 and 6.8% of those age 65 or over.

== Government ==
=== Local government ===
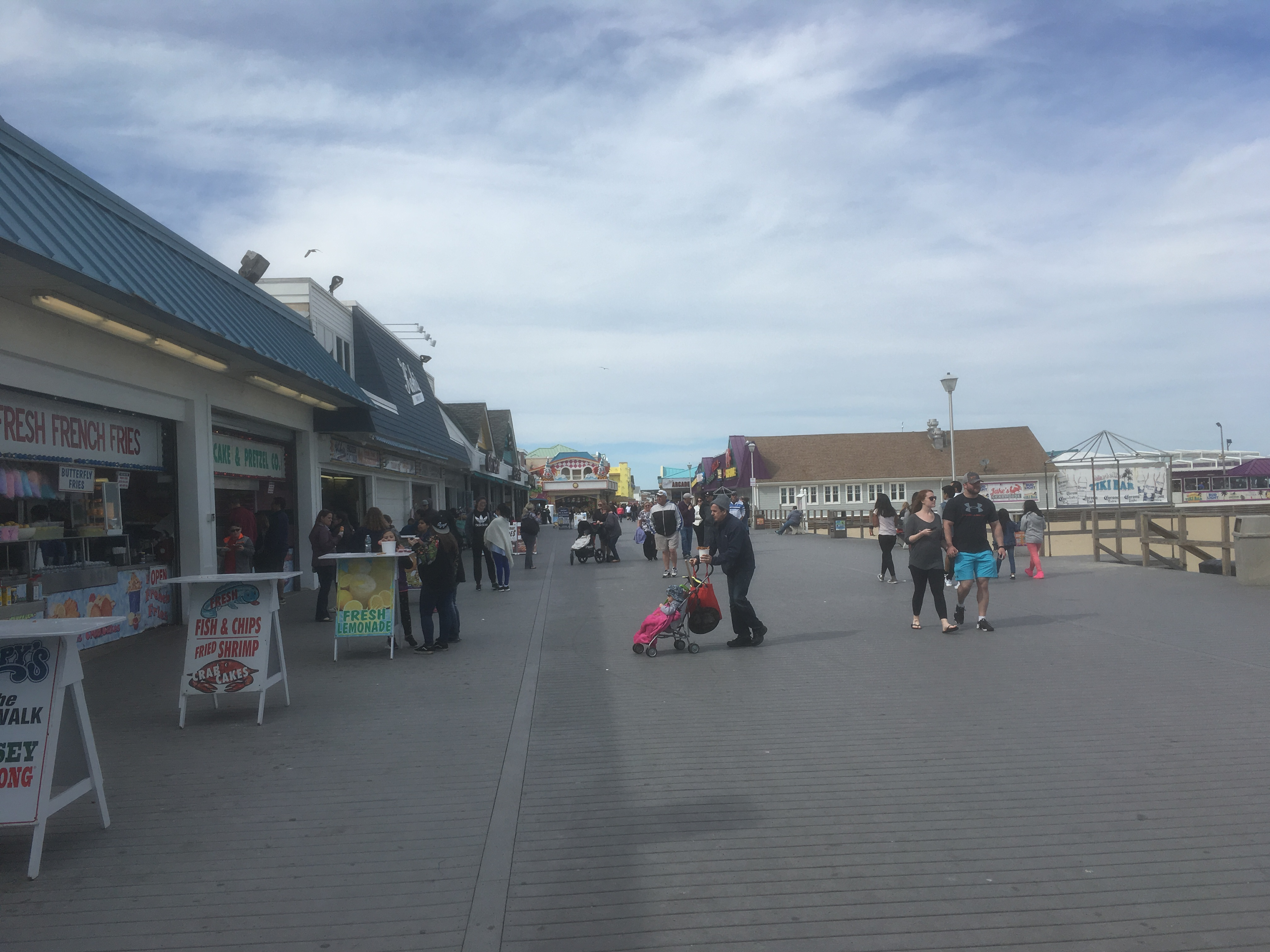
The Point Pleasant Beach boardwalk looking north

Point Pleasant Beach is governed under the borough form of New Jersey municipal government, one of 218 municipalities (of the 564) statewide, making it the most common form of government in New Jersey. The governing body is comprised of the mayor and the borough council, with all positions elected at-large on a partisan basis as part of the November general election. The mayor is elected directly by the voters to a four-year term of office. The borough council includes six members elected to serve three-year terms on a staggered basis, with two seats coming up for election each year in a three-year cycle. The borough form of government used by Point Pleasant Beach is a "weak mayor / strong council" government in which council members act as the legislative body with the mayor presiding at meetings and voting only in the event of a tie. The mayor can veto ordinances subject to an override by a two-thirds majority vote of the council. The mayor makes committee and liaison assignments for council members, and most appointments are made by the mayor with the advice and consent of the council.

As of 2026, the mayor of Point Pleasant Beach is Republican Doug Vitale, whose term of office ends December 31, 2027. Members of the Borough Council are Council President Caryn S. Byrnes (R, 2027), George "Andy" Cortes (R, 2027), Arthur Gant Sr. (R, 2026), Michael M. Ramos (R, 2027), Karen "Kitty" Stillufsen (R, 2028) and Douglas Vitale (R, 2027).

In February 2020, the borough council selected Caryn S. Byrnes to fill the seat expiring in December 2020 that became vacant following the resignation of Paul Kanitra to take office as mayor.

=== Federal, state and county representation ===
Point Pleasant Beach is located in the 4th Congressional District and is part of New Jersey's 10th state legislative district.

For the 119th United States Congress, New Jersey's 4th congressional district is represented by Chris Smith (R, Manchester Township). New Jersey is represented in the United States Senate by Democrats Cory Booker (Newark, term ends 2027) and Andy Kim (Moorestown, term ends 2031).

For the 2026–2027 session, the 10th legislative district of the New Jersey Legislature is represented in the State Senate by James W. Holzapfel (R, Toms River) and in the General Assembly by Paul Kanitra (R, Point Pleasant Beach) and Gregory P. McGuckin (R, Toms River).

Ocean County is governed by a Board of County Commissioners composed of five members who are elected on an at-large basis in partisan elections and serving staggered three-year terms of office, with either one or two seats coming up for election each year as part of the November general election. At an annual reorganization held in the beginning of January, the board chooses a director and a deputy director from among its members. As of 2025, Ocean County's Commissioners (with party affiliation, term-end year and residence) are:

John P. Kelly (R, 2025, Eagleswood Township), Virginia E. Haines (R, 2025, Toms River), Robert Arace (R, Manchester Township, 2027) Jennifer Bacchione (R, Berkeley Township, 2027) and Frank Sadeghi (R, 2026, Toms River).

Constitutional officers elected on a countywide basis are: Clerk Scott M. Colabella (R, 2025, Barnegat Light), Sheriff Michael G. Mastronardy (R, 2025; Toms River) and Surrogate Jeffrey Moran (R, 2028, Beachwood).

=== Politics ===
As of March 2011, there were a total of 3,385 registered voters in Point Pleasant Beach, of which 623 (18.4%) were registered as Democrats, 1,295 (38.3%) were registered as Republicans and 1,465 (43.3%) were registered as Unaffiliated. There were 2 voters registered as either Libertarians or Greens. Among the borough's 2010 Census population, 72.6% (vs. 63.2% in Ocean County) were registered to vote, including 89.5% of those ages 18 and over (vs. 82.6% countywide).

Gubernatorial election results for Point Pleasant Beach
Year	Republican		Democratic		Third party(ies)	
Year	No.	%	No.	%	No.	%
2025	1,500	61.83%	917	37.80%	9	0.37%
2021	1,485	68.21%	676	31.05%	16	0.73%
2017	1,047	61.92%	608	35.96%	36	2.13%
2013	1,332	74.54%	421	23.56%	34	1.90%
2009	1,280	65.95%	546	28.13%	115	5.92%
2005	1,120	56.74%	783	39.67%	71	3.60%

In the 2012 presidential election, Republican Mitt Romney received 60.1% of the vote (1,373 cast), ahead of Democrat Barack Obama with 39.0% (891 votes), and other candidates with 0.9% (20 votes), among the 2,299 ballots cast by the borough's 3,559 registered voters (15 ballots were spoiled), for a turnout of 64.6%. In the 2008 presidential election, Republican John McCain received 58.1% of the vote (1,486 cast), ahead of Democrat Barack Obama with 40.1% (1,026 votes) and other candidates with 1.3% (34 votes), among the 2,557 ballots cast by the borough's 3,533 registered voters, for a turnout of 72.4%. In the 2004 presidential election, Republican George W. Bush received 59.2% of the vote (1,561 ballots cast), outpolling Democrat John Kerry with 39.2% (1,035 votes) and other candidates with 0.9% (32 votes), among the 2,639 ballots cast by the borough's 3,647 registered voters, for a turnout percentage of 72.4.

Presidential Elections Results
Year	Republican	Democratic	Third Parties
2024	59.4% 1,845	38.8% 1,205	1.8% 53
2020	58.8% 1,829	39.2% 1,219	2.0% 40
2016	62.7% 1,582	33.9% 856	3.4% 87
2012	60.1% 1,373	39.0% 891	0.9% 20
2008	58.1% 1,486	40.1% 1,026	1.3% 34
2004	59.2% 1,691	39.2% 1,035	0.9% 32

In the 2013 gubernatorial election, Republican Chris Christie received 74.5% of the vote (1,332 cast), ahead of Democrat Barbara Buono with 23.6% (421 votes), and other candidates with 1.9% (34 votes), among the 1,843 ballots cast by the borough's 3,502 registered voters (56 ballots were spoiled), for a turnout of 52.6%. In the 2009 gubernatorial election, Republican Chris Christie received 65.1% of the vote (1,280 ballots cast), ahead of Democrat Jon Corzine with 27.8% (546 votes), Independent Chris Daggett with 5.3% (105 votes) and other candidates with 0.5% (10 votes), among the 1,966 ballots cast by the borough's 3,425 registered voters, yielding a 57.4% turnout.

United States Senate election results for Point Pleasant Beach1
Year	Republican		Democratic		Third party(ies)	
Year	No.	%	No.	%	No.	%
2024	1,758	61.23%	1,095	38.14%	18	0.63%
2018	1,390	62.95%	751	34.01%	67	3.03%
2012	1,267	59.46%	817	38.34%	47	2.21%
2006	1,004	58.85%	653	38.28%	49	2.87%

United States Senate election results for Point Pleasant Beach2
Year	Republican		Democratic		Third party(ies)	
Year	No.	%	No.	%	No.	%
2020	1,839	60.49%	1,142	37.57%	59	1.94%
2014	889	62.17%	520	36.36%	21	1.47%
2013	711	63.60%	398	35.60%	9	0.81%
2008	1,355	57.83%	937	39.99%	51	2.18%

== Education ==
The Point Pleasant Beach School District serves students in pre-kindergarten through twelfth grade. As of the 2023–24 school year, the district, comprised of two schools, had an enrollment of 646 students and 75.0 classroom teachers (on an FTE basis), for a student–teacher ratio of 8.6:1. Schools in the district (with 2023–24 enrollment data from the National Center for Education Statistics) are G. Harold Antrim Elementary School 310 students in grades PreK–8 and Point Pleasant Beach High School 326 students in grades 9–12.

In addition to the students of Point Pleasant Beach, the district also serves the students of Bay Head and Lavallette for grades 9–12 and those from Mantoloking for K–12, as part of sending/receiving relationships. Some outside students attend the district's schools on a tuition basis.

== Transportation ==
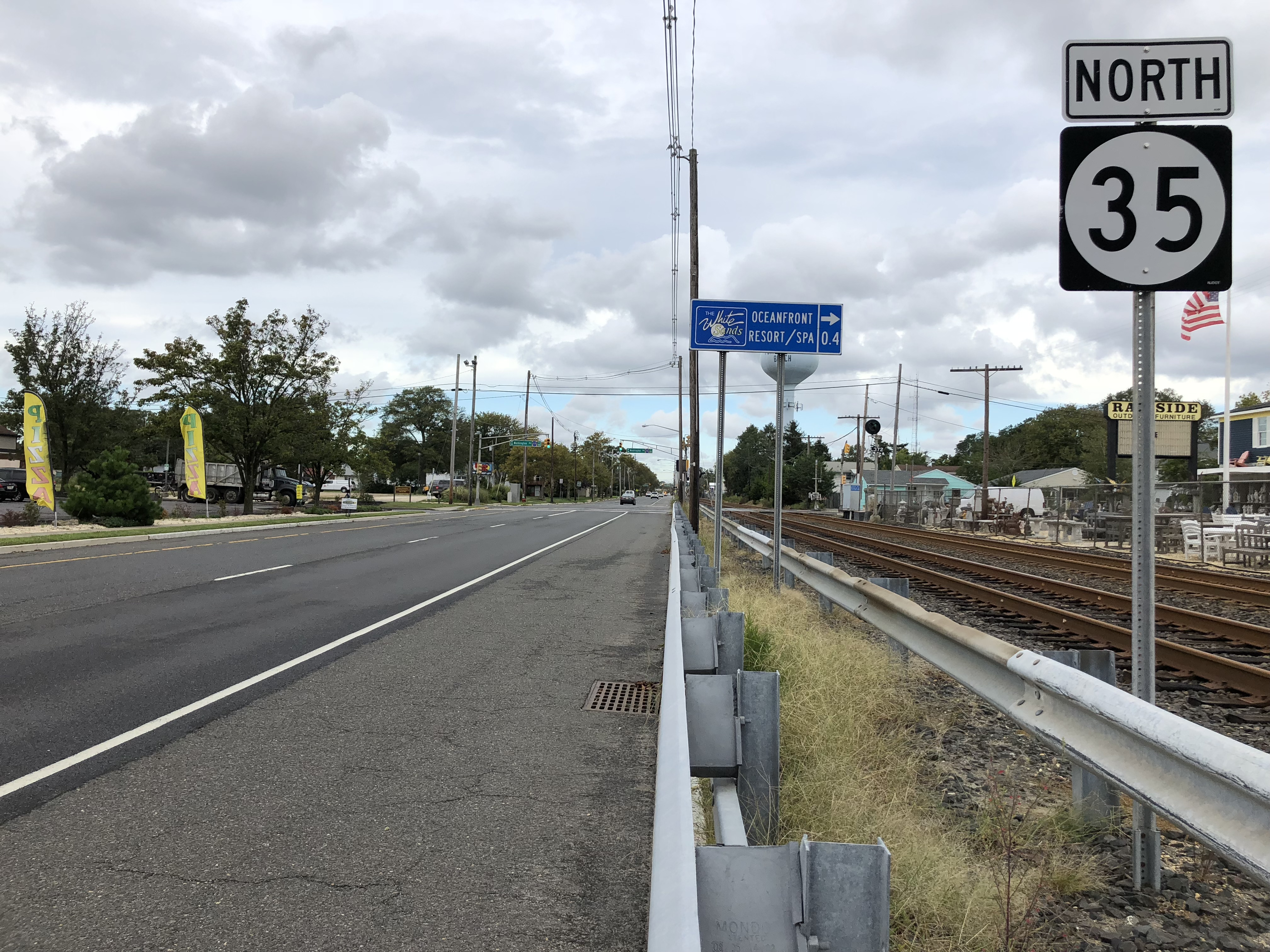
Route 35 northbound in Point Pleasant Beach

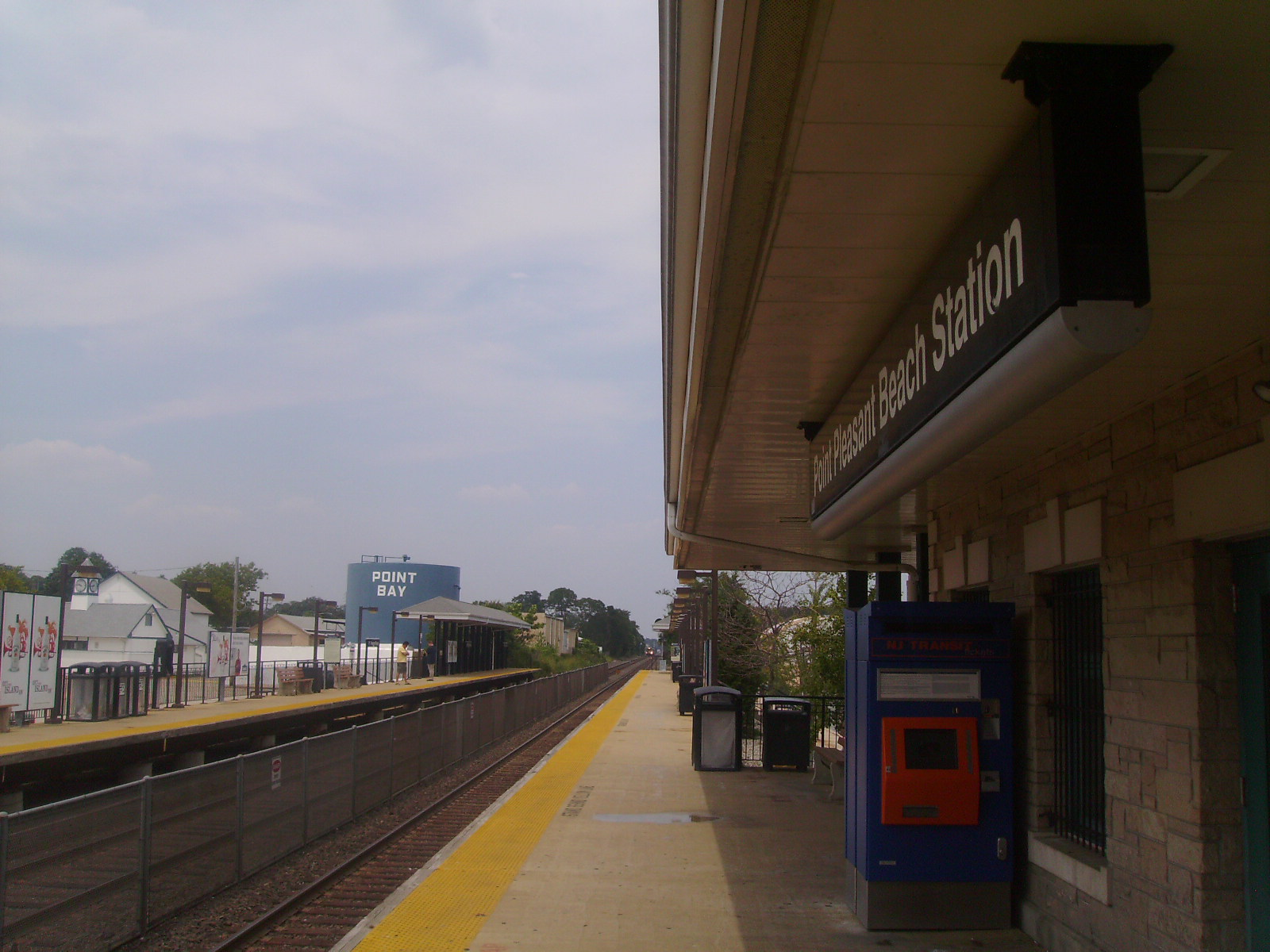
Point Pleasant Beach station, which is served by NJ Transit's North Jersey Coast Line

=== Roads and highways ===
As of May 2010, the borough had a total of 29.66 miles (47.73 km) of roadways, of which 18.50 miles (29.77 km) were maintained by the municipality, 7.86 miles (12.65 km) by Ocean County and 3.30 miles (5.31 km) by the New Jersey Department of Transportation.

Route 35 is the main highway serving Point Pleasant Beach. The highway traverses the borough north to south, connecting Point Pleasant Beach to Bay Head and Brielle. Route 88 has its eastern terminus at the intersection of Route 35 along the southwest edge of Point Pleasant Beach, from which point it heads west through Point Pleasant and onward to Lakewood.

=== Public transportation ===
NJ Transit trains stop at Point Pleasant Beach on Arnold Avenue with service on the North Jersey Coast Line north to Newark Penn Station, Hoboken Terminal, and New York Penn Station.

NJ Transit provides bus service between the borough and Philadelphia on the 317 route along with local service on the 830 route.

Ocean Ride local service is provided on the OC3A Brick—Point Pleasant and the OC4 Lakewood—Brick Link routes.

== In popular culture ==
Composer Edward Manukyan, who lived in Point Pleasant Beach briefly in 2002, wrote the song "Point Pleasant Beach" about the borough.

== Climate ==
According to the Köppen climate classification system, Point Pleasant Beach has a humid subtropical climate (Cfa). Cfa climates are characterized by all months having an average mean temperature above 32.0 °F (0.0 °C), at least four months with an average mean temperature at or above 50.0 °F (10.0 °C), at least one month with an average mean temperature at or above 71.6 °F (22.0 °C) and no significant precipitation difference between seasons. During the summer months at Point Pleasant Beach, a cooling afternoon sea breeze is present on most days, but episodes of extreme heat and humidity can occur with heat index values at or above 95.0 °F (35.0 °C). On average, the wettest month of the year is July which corresponds with the annual peak in thunderstorm activity. During the winter months, episodes of extreme cold and wind can occur with wind chill values below 0.0 °F (−17.8 °C). The plant hardiness zone at Point Pleasant Beach is 7a with an average annual extreme minimum air temperature of 3.7 °F (−15.7 °C). The average seasonal (November–April) snowfall total is between 18 and 24 inches (46 and 61 cm) and the average snowiest month is February which corresponds with the annual peak in nor'easter activity.

Climate data for Point Pleasant Beach, NJ (1981–2010 Averages)
Month	Jan	Feb	Mar	Apr	May	Jun	Jul	Aug	Sep	Oct	Nov	Dec	Year
Mean daily maximum °F (°C)	39.9 (4.4)	42.6 (5.9)	49.1 (9.5)	58.7 (14.8)	68.5 (20.3)	77.6 (25.3)	83.2 (28.4)	81.9 (27.7)	75.7 (24.3)	65.1 (18.4)	55.1 (12.8)	45.1 (7.3)	62.0 (16.7)
Daily mean °F (°C)	32.4 (0.2)	34.7 (1.5)	40.9 (4.9)	50.3 (10.2)	60.0 (15.6)	69.4 (20.8)	75.1 (23.9)	74.0 (23.3)	67.4 (19.7)	56.3 (13.5)	47.1 (8.4)	37.5 (3.1)	53.8 (12.1)
Mean daily minimum °F (°C)	24.9 (−3.9)	26.7 (−2.9)	32.7 (0.4)	41.9 (5.5)	51.5 (10.8)	61.2 (16.2)	67.0 (19.4)	66.0 (18.9)	59.0 (15.0)	47.3 (8.5)	39.0 (3.9)	30.0 (−1.1)	45.7 (7.6)
Average precipitation inches (mm)	3.66 (93)	3.12 (79)	4.19 (106)	4.00 (102)	3.45 (88)	3.65 (93)	4.72 (120)	4.44 (113)	3.44 (87)	3.74 (95)	4.05 (103)	4.04 (103)	46.50 (1,181)
Average relative humidity (%)	64.9	62.0	60.8	62.1	65.7	70.3	69.2	71.2	71.1	69.6	67.8	65.8	66.7
Average dew point °F (°C)	21.9 (−5.6)	23.0 (−5.0)	28.4 (−2.0)	37.8 (3.2)	48.5 (9.2)	59.3 (15.2)	64.3 (17.9)	64.1 (17.8)	57.7 (14.3)	46.5 (8.1)	37.0 (2.8)	27.1 (−2.7)	43.1 (6.2)
Source: PRISM

Climate data for Sandy Hook, NJ Ocean Water Temperature (26 N Point Pleasant Beach)
Month	Jan	Feb	Mar	Apr	May	Jun	Jul	Aug	Sep	Oct	Nov	Dec	Year
Daily mean °F (°C)	37 (3)	36 (2)	40 (4)	46 (8)	55 (13)	62 (17)	69 (21)	72 (22)	68 (20)	59 (15)	51 (11)	43 (6)	53 (12)
Source: NOAA

== Ecology ==
According to the A. W. Kuchler U.S. potential natural vegetation types, Point Pleasant Beach would have an Appalachian Oak (104) vegetation type with an Eastern Hardwood Forest (25) vegetation form.

== Notable people ==
People who were born in, residents of, or otherwise closely associated with Point Pleasant Beach include:

- Evelyn Adams, two-time winner of the New Jersey Lottery
- Jason Cairns retired American soccer forward who played professionally for the Cincinnati Riverhawks and the New Jersey Stallions
- Jim Carone (born 1981), head coach of the Wagner Seahawks baseball team
- Robert (born 1966) and Dean DeLeo (born 1961), bass guitarist and guitarist respectively, from the musical rock group Stone Temple Pilots, grew up in Point Pleasant Beach
- Matt Farrell (born 1996), basketball player
- Katelynn Flaherty (born 1996), former basketball player for the Michigan Wolverines, who is the school's all-time leading scorer in points, man or woman, with 2,776 career points
- Alfred M. Gray Jr. (born 1928), 29th Commandant of the Marine Corps
- Dickie Harris (born 1950), all-star defensive back who played for the Montreal Alouettes of the Canadian Football League
- James W. Holzapfel (born 1944), member of the New Jersey Senate
- Leonard Lomell (1920–2011), U.S. Army Ranger who played a pivotal role in destroying German gun emplacements on D-Day

Preceded by Manasquan	Beaches of New Jersey	Succeeded by Bay Head
