= Nᵒ 2 =

Studio album by Serge Gainsbourg
- Released: September 1959
- Recorded: 12, 14, 25, 27 and 29 May; 4 June 1959
- Studio: Studio Blanqui, Paris
- Genre: French pop, jazz
- Length: 20:39
- Label: Philips
- Producer: Jean-Yves Billet

Serge Gainsbourg chronology
Du chant à la une !... (1958)	Nᵒ 2 (1959)	L'Étonnant Serge Gainsbourg (1961)

Professional ratings
Review scores
Source	Rating
AllMusic	4/5 stars

Nᵒ 2 is the second studio album by French musician Serge Gainsbourg, released in 1959. It features Gainsbourg backed by the Alain Goraguer Orchestra. The album was not well received at the time of its release.

Music journalist and Gainsbourg biographer Sylvie Simmons described the album as "...mutant jazz-pop engaged in an unnatural act with chanson, French literature and Americana..."

The album cover is a reference to French author and musician Boris Vian. The cover of Lovage's 2001 debut album pays homage to the cover.

== Track listing ==
All tracks are written by Serge Gainsbourg, except where noted.

No.	Title	Writer(s)	Length
1.	"Le Claqueur de doigts"		3:07
2.	"La Nuit d'octobre"	music: Serge Gainsbourg; lyrics: Alfred de Musset	3:05
3.	"Adieu créature"		2:11
4.	"L'Anthracite"		2:32
5.	"Mambo miam miam"		2:35
6.	"Indifférente"	lyrics: Serge Gainsbourg; music: Alain Goraguer	2:17
7.	"Jeunes Femmes et Vieux Messieurs"		2:04
8.	"L'Amour à la papa" (original by Juliette Gréco)		2:48

== Personnel ==
Credits adapted from liner notes.

- Serge Gainsbourg – vocals
- Léo Petit – guitar
- Paul Rovère, Pierre Michelot – double bass
- Christian Garros – drums
- Alain Goraguer – piano, arrangements, conductor
- Alain Goraguer et Son Orchestre – orchestra
- Georges Grenu, Jo Hrasko, Marcel Hrasko, Pierre Gossez, William Boucaya – saxophone
- Fernand Verstraete, Fred Gérard, Maurice Thomas, Roger Guérin – trumpet
- André Paquinet, Charles Verstraete – trombone
- Gaby Vilain – bass trombone

Technical

- Denis Bourgeois – executive production
- Jacques Aubert – photography
