= Lydia Miladinovic =

Australian rower

Personal information
- Nationality: Australian
- Born: 1951

Sport
- Sport: Rowing
- Club: Sydney Women's Rowing Club

Achievements and titles
- National finals: Victoria Cup 1969; ULVA Trophy 1974 & 76

Lydia Miladinovic (born 1951), is an Australian pioneer representative rower. With Evelyn Adams she rowed in Australia's first international representative women's crew. A five-time Australian national champion, accomplished as both a sculler and sweep-oarswoman, Miladinovic made her sole international representative appearance for Australia at the 1974 World Rowing Championships.

== Club and state rowing ==
Miladinovic's senior club rowing was from the Sydney Women's Rowing Club at a time when there was nil integration and little co-operation with the nearby men's Sydney Rowing Club boatshed and clubhouse. When she took up Master's Rowing in the late 1980s she rowed in Glebe Rowing Club colours.

She began contesting national titles at Australian Rowing Championships from 1968 and took the silver medal in the Women's Senior Pair at the 1969 Australian Championships. She won the gold and a national championship title in a coxless pair with Tricia Hennesy in 1973, and then in the pair with Evelyn Adams in 1974. In 1975 she raced the coxless pair with Libby Hollingworth and then in 1977 in a SWRC coxed quad scull. They won a national title in 1977 and took the silver in a coxless quad in 1978.

Miladinovic was first honoured with New South Wales state selection in 1969 when she was picked to contest the Victoria Cup for lightweight women's fours at the annual Interstate Regatta within the Australian Rowing Championships. That crew was victorious. In 1974 she stroked to victory the NSW openweight women's four contesting the ULVA Trophy. She made another ULVA Trophy appearance for New South Wales in 1976 for a second placing.

== International representative rowing ==
In 1974 the NSW state championships were regarded as the unofficial selection trial for the 1974 World Rowing Championships. Miladonivic had won the national title in the pair in 1973 and then joined up with Adams to go back to back in 1974. They were selected to race at the 1974 World Championships in Lucerne which included the first ever world title events for women. They finished fourth in their heat, lest in their repechage but raced the B final for an overall eleventh-place finish.
