= Serge Gainsbourg N° 4 =

Studio album by Serge Gainsbourg
- Released: 23 May 1962
- Recorded: 14, 16, 20, 21, 28 March 1962; 3, 16 April 1962
- Studio: Studio Blanqui, Paris
- Genre: Jazz, French pop
- Length: 18:48
- Label: Philips
- Producer: Jacques Plait

Serge Gainsbourg chronology
| L'Étonnant Serge Gainsbourg (1961) | Serge Gainsbourg N° 4 (1962) | Gainsbourg Confidentiel (1963) |

Serge Gainsbourg N° 4 is the fourth studio album by French musician Serge Gainsbourg, released in 1962. It is his last to feature his original style blending chanson and jazz, with a more varied approach with Latino and rock and roll influences.

== Track listing ==
All tracks are written by Serge Gainsbourg, except where noted.

| No. | Title | Writer(s) | Length |
|---|---|---|---|
| 1. | "Les Goémons" (original by Catherine Sauvage) | | 2:37 |
| 2. | "Black Trombone" | | 2:26 |
| 3. | "Baudelaire" | music: Serge Gainsbourg; lyrics: Charles Baudelaire | 2:36 |
| 4. | "Intoxicated Man" | | 2:35 |
| 5. | "Quand tu t'y mets" | | 1:50 |
| 6. | "Les Cigarillos" | | 1:46 |
| 7. | "Requiem pour un twisteur" | | 2:38 |
| 8. | "Ce grand méchant vous" | music: Serge Gainsbourg; lyrics: Francis Claude, Serge Gainsbourg | 2:20 |

== Personnel ==
Credits adapted from liner notes.

- Serge Gainsbourg – vocals
- Paul Rovère – double bass
- Christian Garros – drums
- Alain Goraguer – piano, arrangements, conductor
- Alain Goraguer et Son Orchestre – orchestra

Technical

- Jacques Aubert – photography
