= Gainsbourg Percussions =

Studio album by Serge Gainsbourg
- Released: 26 October 1964
- Recorded: 5–9, 16 October 1964
- Studios: Studio Blanqui, Paris
- Genres: Jazz, Latin, African
- Length: 28:00
- Label: Philips
- Producer: Claude Dejacques

Serge Gainsbourg chronology
| Gainsbourg Confidentiel (1963) | Gainsbourg Percussions (1964) | Bonnie and Clyde (1968) |

Professional ratings
Review scores
| Source | Rating |
|---|---|
| AllMusic | 4/5 stars |
| Pitchfork | 8.2/10 |

Gainsbourg Percussions is the sixth studio album by French musician Serge Gainsbourg, released in 1964. Gainsbourg reinvents his style with Latin, African, and Cuban influences. It would be his last album before 1968.

== Track listing ==
All tracks are written by Serge Gainsbourg, except where noted.

| No. | Title | Writer(s) | Length |
|---|---|---|---|
| 1. | "Joanna" | Serge Gainsbourg, Babatunde Olatunji | 1:59 |
| 2. | "Là-bas c'est naturel" | | 2:28 |
| 3. | "Pauvre Lola" | Serge Gainsbourg, Miriam Makeba | 2:26 |
| 4. | "Quand mon 6,35 me fait les yeux doux" | | 1:50 |
| 5. | "Machins choses" | | 3:15 |
| 6. | "Les Sambassadeurs" | | 2:01 |
| 7. | "New York U.S.A." | Serge Gainsbourg, Babatunde Olatunji | 2:17 |
| 8. | "Couleur Café" | | 2:12 |
| 9. | "Marabout" | Serge Gainsbourg, Babatunde Olatunji | 2:08 |
| 10. | "Ces petits riens" | | 2:00 |
| 11. | "Tatoué Jérémie" | | 1:44 |
| 12. | "Coco and Co" | | 3:00 |

"Joanna" is an uncredited cover of Babatunde Olatunji's "Kiyakiya (Why Do You Run Away?)" from Drums of Passion LP (1959)
"New York U.S.A." is an uncredited cover of Babatunde Olatunji's "Akiwowo (Chant to the Trainman)" from Drums Of Passion (1959)
"Marabout" is an uncredited cover of Babatunde Olatunji's "Gin-Go-Lo-Ba (Drums of Passion)" from Drums Of Passion LP (1959)
"Pauvre Lola" contains an uncredited sample of Miriam Makeba's "Umqokozo (Children's Game Song About a New Red Dress)" from The Many Voices of Miriam Makeba LP (1962)

== Personnel ==
Credits adapted from liner notes.

Musicians

- Serge Gainsbourg – vocals
- Alain Goraguer – musical direction, arrangements, orchestra conductor, piano
- Christian Garros – drums
- André Arpino – drums
- Armand Molinetti – drums
- Michel Gaudry – double bass
- Michel Portal – tenor saxophone, soprano saxophone
- Eddy Louiss – organ
- France Gall – "laughs" (track 3, uncredited)
- Background vocals and percussions are by unidentified personnel

Technical

- Claude Dejacques – production
- Roger Roche – sound engineering
- Jacques Aubert – cover art
- Jean-Pierre Haie – remastering (remastered edition)
- Jean-Marie Guérin – remastering (remastered edition)
