= Vu de l'extérieur =

Studio album by Serge Gainsbourg
- Released: November 16, 1973
- Recorded: March–May 1973
- Studio: Phonogram (London, UK)
- Genre: Rock, pop
- Length: 28:29
- Label: Philips
- Producer: Peter Olliff

Serge Gainsbourg chronology
Histoire de Melody Nelson (1971)	Vu de l'extérieur (1973)	Rock Around the Bunker (1975)

Vu de l'extérieur is a studio album by French musician Serge Gainsbourg, released in 1973.

== Overview ==
1971's Histoire de Melody Nelson, a first-person concept album depicting the meeting and eventual seduction of doomed English teenager Melody Nelson, was Gainsbourg's first major success in the LP market and helped form his reputation as a controversial figure. Not one to shy away from controversy, Gainsbourg had formed the nucleus of what would become Vu de l'extérieur when he suffered a heart attack at the age of 45. By the time he was back to health, he resumed composing the songs for the new album, among them one of his biggest hits, "Je suis venu te dire que je m'en vais".

While not quite a concept album, especially when compared to other Gainsbourg albums such as Histoire de Melody Nelson, Rock Around the Bunker and L'Homme à tête de chou, certain thematic elements–such as scatology and childishness–do run through the album.

The album sold approximately 20,000 copies upon release in France.

== Track listing ==
All tracks are written by Serge Gainsbourg.

No.	Title	Length
1.	"Je suis venu te dire que je m'en vais"	3:23
2.	"Vu de l'extérieur"	3:40
3.	"Panpan cucul"	2:41
4.	"Par hasard et pas rasé"	2:28
5.	"Des vents des pets des poums"	2:55
6.	"Titicaca"	2:57
7.	"Pamela Popo"	2:24
8.	"La poupée qui fait"	3:01
9.	"L'Hippopodame"	1:45
10.	"Sensuelle et sans suite"	3:01

== Personnel ==
Credits adapted from liner notes.

- Serge Gainsbourg – arrangement
- Alan Parker – acoustic and lead guitar
- Judd Proctor – acoustic guitar
- Brian Odgers – bass guitar
- David Richmond – bass guitar
- Dougie Wright – drums
- Alan Hawkshaw – keyboards, electric piano, organ
- Chris Karan – percussion
