= The Sand and the Soldier =

1967 song by Serge Gainsbourg

The Sand and the Soldier (French: Le Sable et le Soldat) is a song composed and recorded in 1967 by the French singer Serge Gainsbourg.

Its official SACEM registration title is Le Sabre et le Soldat.

== History ==
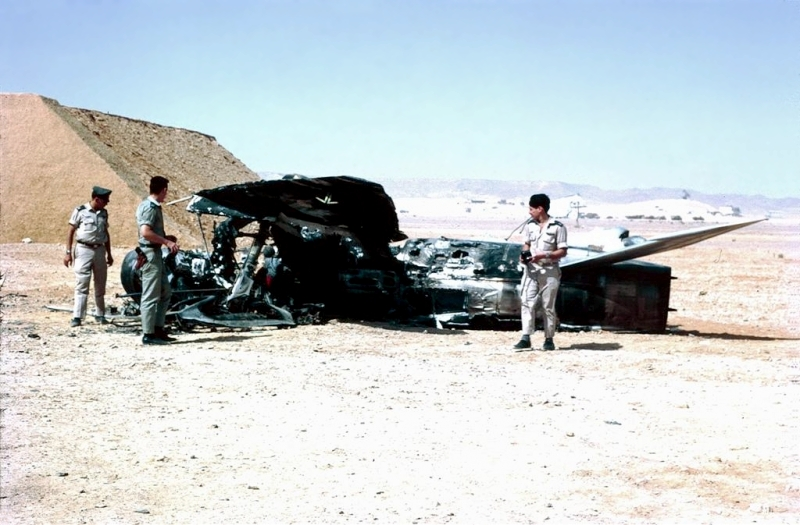
Israeli officers near a destroyed Egyptian MiG-21 at the Bir Gifgafa Airfield (June 1967).

In 1967, Avraham Scherman, cultural advisor to the Israeli Embassy in Paris, asked the then-little-known Serge Gainsbourg to compose a new military march intended to boost the morale of the IDF troops, on the eve of anticipated violent combat.

In early June 1967, Gainsbourg wrote the song in French and then translated it into Hebrew. During the night of June 6–7, he recorded a French-language demo version, lasting less than two minutes, accompanied by an electric organ. The Hebrew version was not recorded at the time.

The recording was sent via diplomatic pouch to Tel Aviv, arriving during the Six-Day War. After Israel's victory, the French version was broadcast on Kol Israel radio. The song remained archived and forgotten for the next 35 years.

In 2002, collector Jean-Gabriel Le Nouvel, who knew of its existence, conducted extensive research and eventually recovered the tape from the archives. The restored original version was then broadcast exclusively by RCJ radio in 2002. Subsequently, the Kol Record label produced and recorded the Hebrew adaptation, titled Al Holot Israel, performed by the IDF choir, named Leakat Magav.

== Theme ==
The lyrics, Zionist and militant in nature, sharply contrast with Gainsbourg's usual repertoire. They include numerous references to Jewish culture, such as David, Goliath...

Upon its first broadcast, the lyrics surprised many. The magazine Tribune juive wrote: "[…] And yet, Gainsbourg was not attached to Israel. In fact, he never set foot there. And when he spoke of his roots, he preferred to mention his parents’ Russia. Maybe in this song he confesses what he never dared say? [...] Nobody imagined Gainsbourg, although he never hid being Jewish — ‘I was born under a lucky… yellow star,’ he said — would have written such a committed song for the young State of Israel following the Six-Day War and the liberation of Jerusalem..."

During his lifetime, Gainsbourg spoke little of Israel, and often contradictorily. On 3 November 1982, during "A Day with Serge Gainsbourg" on France Culture hosted by Noël Simsolo, Gainsbourg said: "Fight for my Jewish origins? Why not, but I don't know where… I'm Ashkenazi, not an Israeli guy."

However, in a 1981 interview with Patrick Bouchitey on Carbone 14, Gainsbourg said he nearly went to Israel to get himself killed: "You really would have gone to fight? — Yes, if things turned bad… No, not to fight, to get killed! Yes, instinctively, because of my roots."
