= Jim Carone =

American baseball coach (born 1981)

Current position
- Title: Head coach
- Team: McDaniel
- Conference: Centennial
- Record: 0–0

Biographical details
- Born: April 13, 1981 (age 45); Point Pleasant Beach, New Jersey, U.S.

Playing career
- 2000–2003: Monmouth

Coaching career (HC unless noted)
- 2004: NJIT (assistant)
- 2005: Stevens Tech (assistant)
- 2006: Wagner (assistant)
- 2007–2008: Rider (assistant)
- 2009–2011: Villanova (assistant)
- 2012–2021: Wagner
- 2022–present: McDaniel

Head coaching record
- Overall: 207–266–1

Accomplishments and honors

Championships
- NEC regular season (2018)

Awards
- NEC Coach of the Year (2018)

Jim Carone (born April 13, 1981) is an American baseball coach, who is the current head baseball coach of the McDaniel Green Terror. He played college baseball at Monmouth. He has also been the head coach of the Wagner Seahawks (2012–2021).

Carone played at Monmouth University, registering among the nation's best in ERA in his junior season. He earned Northeast Conference Pitcher of the Year honors for his efforts that season, setting a program record for wins in a season with 10.

After ending his playing career, Carone served single seasons as an assistant coach at then-Division II NJIT, Division III Stevens Tech, and Wagner. He then served two seasons at Rider before three seasons as pitching coach at Villanova. He was hired as head coach at Wagner on January 30, 2012.

On May 24, 2021, Carone announced his resignation from Wagner.

== Head coaching record ==
Record table
Season	Team	Overall	Conference	Standing	Postseason
Wagner Seahawks (Northeast Conference) (2012–2021)
2012	Wagner	22–33	15–17	6th	
2013	Wagner	24–31	16–16	T–5th	
2014	Wagner	19–35	11–13	T–4th	
2015	Wagner	27–23–1	15–9	2nd	
2016	Wagner	19–33	13–19	6th	
2017	Wagner	22–28	13–12	3rd	
2018	Wagner	38–18	21–7	T–1st	
2019	Wagner	19–32	11–13	T-3rd	
2020	Wagner	6–8	0–0		Season canceled due to COVID-19
2021	Wagner	11–25	8–22	T-6th	
Wagner:		207–266–1	123–128		
Total:		207–266–1			
National champion Postseason invitational champion Conference regular season champion Conference regular season and conference tournament champion Division regular season champion Division regular season and conference tournament champion Conference tournament champion
