= Histoire de Melody Nelson =

Studio album by Serge Gainsbourg
- Released: 24 March 1971
- Recorded: 21 April 1970 – 4 February 1971
- Studios: Studio Marble Arch, London, UK; Studio des Dames, Paris, France
- Genres: French pop; avant-funk
- Length: 27:57
- Language: French
- Label: Philips
- Producer: Jean-Claude Desmarty

Serge Gainsbourg chronology
Jane Birkin/Serge Gainsbourg (1969)	Histoire de Melody Nelson (1971)	Vu de l'extérieur (1973)

Histoire de Melody Nelson (French: [istwaʁ də melɔdi nɛlsɔn]; "Story of Melody Nelson") is a 1971 concept album by the French singer and songwriter Serge Gainsbourg, arranged and co-written by Jean-Claude Vannier. Produced by Jean-Claude Desmarty, the album was released on March 24, 1971 through Philips Records. Its narrative follows an illicit romance which develops between the middle-aged narrator and fourteen-year-old girl Melody Nelson, portrayed on the album and its cover art by Gainsbourg's then-partner Jane Birkin.

Histoire de Melody Nelson is considered by many critics and fans to be Gainsbourg's most influential and accomplished work, as well as one of the greatest French-language albums in popular music history.

== Concept ==
At just under twenty-eight minutes, the short running time and the stylistic consistency and similarity throughout Histoire de Melody Nelson give it qualities more in line with an extended play or a single continuous suite. Its mix of funk-style electric guitar and bass guitar, Gainsbourg's spoken word and Sprechgesang vocal styles, and lush string and choral arrangements by arranger and co-writer Jean-Claude Vannier, have proven to be highly influential amongst later musical performers.

The cover photograph was shot by Tony Frank. It depicts Gainsbourg's partner Jane Birkin wearing a red wig, and with her jeans rolled down slightly to accommodate her early stage of pregnancy.

=== Plot ===
While driving his Rolls-Royce Silver Ghost, the album's unnamed narrator is distracted by the silver statue on his car's hood, loses control of the vehicle and collides with a young red-haired girl on a bicycle. The girl introduces herself as Melody Nelson ("Melody"). The narrator develops a romantic and sexual interest in Melody, who is revealed to be about fifteen years old ("Ballade de Melody Nelson"). He describes the happiness he experiences in her company ("Valse de Melody"), but questions her honesty about her inexperience in love and threatens her should she have lied to him ("Ah ! Melody"). A sexual encounter between the narrator and Melody in a discreet hotel is implied ("L’Hôtel particulier"). Afterwards, Melody boards a cargo plane to return to Sunderland, England, but an autopilot error causes it to crash, killing her ("En Melody"). The narrator laments Melody's death and, drawing a parallel with the cargo cults of Melanesia, hopes that another plane crash might bring her back ("Cargo culte").

== Release ==
After the release of the album, a music video was made for each song and released all together as Melody, a short musical.

On October 18, 2011, Mercury Records through Universal Music released the album with a second CD containing alternate takes of all seven tracks as well as instrumental and vocal versions of the excised track "Melody Lit Babar". A limited edition was also released that included a DVD which featured the original album remixed in Dolby Digital 5.1 surround sound and a 40-minute documentary on the making of the album which includes interviews with Jane Birkin, Jean-Claude Vannier, and others. This release also includes a full-color booklet of liner notes in both French and English.

== Critical reception ==
Professional ratings
Aggregate scores
Source	Rating
Metacritic	96/100
Review scores
Source	Rating
AllMusic	5/5 stars
The A.V. Club	A
Blender	4/5 stars
Paste	9.1/10
Pitchfork	10/10
PopMatters	10/10
Spin	8/10
Tiny Mix Tapes	5/5 stars
Uncut	4/5 stars
Under the Radar	9/10

Upon its release in 1971, Histoire de Melody Nelson received critical acclaim and praise. At Metacritic, which assigns a normalized rating out of 100 to reviews from critics, the album received an average score of 96, which indicates "universal acclaim", based on 9 reviews. Jason Ankeny of AllMusic described the album as "arguably [Gainsbourg's] most coherent and perfectly realized studio album...by turns fascinating and repellent, hilarious and grim, but never dull -- which, in Gainsbourg's world, would be the ultimate (and quite possibly the only) sin." Keith Phipps of The A.V. Club wrote "It’s a true album—its tale of innocence lost and unearned last chances wouldn’t work as well in any other medium." Tom Ewing of Pitchfork gave the album a perfect score, particularly praising the opening and closing tracks as depictions of "the black spaces of a man's interior." He also lauded the "originality" of the record, describing its sound as like "nothing else in rock." D.M. Edwards of PopMatters commented that "anyone with an interest in hearing a blueprint for trip hop or a master class in the depiction of desire in pop music, should be sure to listen to this mysterious, timeless, contradictory album."

=== Accolades ===
Publication	Country	Accolade	Year	Rank
Pitchfork	US	Top 100 Albums of the 1970s	2004	21
Rolling Stone France	France	The 100 Greatest French Rock Albums	2010	4

== Legacy ==
Histoire de Melody Nelson is regarded by many critics and fans to be Gainsbourg's magnum opus and his most influential release. While it became a pivotal album of the 1970s and was instrumental in the development of French rock and the trip hop movement of the 1990s, it has also influenced many musical artists outside France, including Jarvis Cocker of Pulp, Beck, Tricky, Broadcast, Barry Adamson of Magazine, David Holmes, Cibo Matto, Neil Hannon of the Divine Comedy, Stereolab, Michael Stipe of R.E.M., Portishead, The Last Shadow Puppets and Arctic Monkeys. Portishead based its musical style on the album's mixture of orchestrations with dusty drums, while Beck utilized the album's main theme heavily on his 2002 song "Paper Tiger", from the album Sea Change. French electronic music band Air was also influenced by the album. Faith No More and Mr. Bungle vocalist Mike Patton has also expressed his appreciation for the album and Gainsbourg's music, stating that he "was immediately awe-struck by the elegance, variety and detail of Serge's 'pop' forms...it made [me] think that [I] had a lot to learn".

The songs on Histoire de Melody Nelson have been covered and sampled by various artists of different genres. British rock band Placebo recorded a cover version of "The Ballad of Melody Nelson", which was released on a compilation of cover versions with their Sleeping with Ghosts album. Portishead also covered the song in French, collaborating with Jane Birkin. Mick Harvey of Nick Cave and the Bad Seeds also released a total of four Gainsbourg tribute albums, two in the 1990s, Intoxicated Man (1995) and Pink Elephants (1997), and two more nearly 20 years later, Delirium Tremens (2016) and Intoxicated Women (2017). He also joined the stage with frequent collaborator PJ Harvey in 1996 for performances of two Gainsbourg songs, "Bonnie and Clyde" and "Harley Davidson". Michael Stipe covered "L'hôtel particulier" under the name "L'Hotel" on a 2006 Gainsbourg tribute album, Monsieur Gainsbourg Revisited. Hip hop act De La Soul sampled "Ah! Melody" on their song, "Held Down" from AOI: Bionix (2001); and Portishead's remix of Massive Attack's 1995 song "Karmacoma" sampled the bassline of "Melody". French electronic music producer Mirwais sampled "Cargo Culte" on his album Production (2000). David Holmes used a sample of "Melody" on his track "Don't Die Just Yet", from his 1997 album Let's Get Killed (1997). Brazilian musician Rogério Skylab covered "Ah! Melody" for his 2009 album Skygirls. Brooklyn indie rock band Ava Luna covered the album in its entirety, both live at the 2016 Northside Festival, and then as a studio album in 2018.

=== Tributes ===
Jean-Claude Vannier performed the album live at London's Barbican on October 21, 2006 with guest vocalists Jarvis Cocker, Badly Drawn Boy, Brigitte Fontaine, The Bad Seeds’ Mick Harvey and the lead singer from Super Furry Animals, Gruff Rhys. Vannier performed the album in its entirety alongside his own solo album L'Enfant assassin des mouches. Publicity for the Barbican concert revealed that the musicians used for the album were Dougie Wright, Big Jim Sullivan, Herbie Flowers and Vic Flick who all joined Vannier for the concert. The BBC Concert Orchestra, the Crouch End Festival Chorus and a children’s string quintet were also part of the show.

On 22 and 23 October 2008, Jean-Claude Vannier performed the album live at the Cité de la Musique with guest vocalists Mathieu Amalric, Brigitte Fontaine, Brian Molko, Martina Topley-Bird, Daniel Darc, Clotilde Hesme, and Seaming To. Also performing were Herbie Flowers (bass), Claude Engel (guitar) and Pierre-Alain Dahan (drums). Vannier also performed his album L'Enfant Assassin Des Mouches. The Lamoureux Orchestra, the Yound Choir of Paris and a children's string quintet were also part of the show.

On 28 August 2011, Vannier participated in A Tribute to Serge Gainsbourg at the Hollywood Bowl in Hollywood, California. The artists that performed Gainsbourg's songs that evening included Beck, Sean Lennon and Charlotte Kemp Muhl, Mike Patton, Zola Jesus, Victoria Legrand of Beach House, Ed Droste of Grizzly Bear, and Serge's son Lulu Gainsbourg. The second half of the evening included a performance of the album with Vannier conducting. Each of the album's songs were performed by different combinations of the evening's artists, backed by the Hollywood Bowl Orchestra and the Cal State Fullerton chorale. American actor Joseph Gordon-Levitt also participated in the album's performance.

On 29 June 2026, the Israeli-French singer Keren Ann performed the complete album in the Tel Aviv Performing Arts Center with the pianist Shlomi Shaban, the Israeli Jerusalem Camerata orchestra, and the Bat Kol choir. Maariv music critic Or Bergman praised Keren Ann's choice not to "become Gainsbourg", but to deliver the vocals with her own personality.

== Track listing ==
All tracks are written by Serge Gainsbourg, except where noted.

Histoire de Melody Nelson track listing
No.	Title	Length
1.	"Melody"	7:32
2.	"Ballade de Melody Nelson" (Gainsbourg, Jean-Claude Vannier)	2:00
3.	"Valse de Melody"	1:31
4.	"Ah ! Melody" (Gainsbourg, Vannier)	1:47
5.	"L'Hôtel particulier"	4:05
6.	"En Melody" (Gainsbourg, Vannier)	3:25
7.	"Cargo culte"	7:37

== Personnel ==
Album personnel:

- Serge Gainsbourg – vocals, piano, guitar
- Alan Parker – guitar
- Vic Flick – lead guitar
- Big Jim Sullivan – rhythm guitar
- Dave Richmond – bass guitar
- Roger Coulam – keyboards
- Jean-Claude Vannier – orchestral arrangements, conductor
- Jane Birkin – vocals
- Dougie Wright – drums
- Jean-Luc Ponty – electric violin (6)
- Jean-Claude Charvier – recording
- Jean-Claude Desmarty – production

== Charts ==
Chart performance for Histoire de Melody Nelson
Chart	Peak position
Belgian Albums (Ultratop Wallonia)	199
French Albums (SNEP)	56
