= Evelyn Adams (lottery winner) =

American lottery winner

- Known for: Lottery winner

Evelyn Marie Adams was an American lottery winner. She won the New Jersey Lottery twice, in 1985 and 1986, for over $5.4 million combined (both prizes were paid in the form of mandatory annuities). However, she was a compulsive gambler, and lost large sums at Atlantic City casinos and through a string of unsuccessful business deals.

== Lottery wins ==
A clerk in a convenience store who was a resident of Point Pleasant Beach, New Jersey, Adams increased her weekly lottery spending from $25 to $100 per week over several years before she won two different multi-million jackpots in the span of four months – one for $3.9 million in October 1985 and the other for $1.4 million in February 1986, making her the first person in the history of the New Jersey Lottery to win multiple million-dollar jackpot prizes. Of the 22 states at the time with lotteries, none had had a two-time winner. The odds of winning the first jackpot were 1 in 3.2 million; the second, 1 in 5.2 million. Both jackpots were paid out on an annuity basis, with a total of $218,000 paid annually after 20% was deducted for taxes.

After winning her first prize, Adams paid off bills and set up a fund to pay college tuition for her daughter, in addition to buying a new car and giving gifts to those close to her. Having increased her weekly ticket purchases from $25 per week to $100 weekly after winning her first grand prize, Adams said that "I'm going to quit playing" having won twice. She had a sense that she "couldn't go anywhere without being recognized" and felt that she had lost her privacy. While some friends and family were happy for her and her new-found wealth, others resented it. She deferred plans to use her winnings to study music and eventually open a music store, instead buying – and later selling – the convenience store where she had worked. After giving away substantial portions of her winnings, Adams tried to choose more carefully among the many requests she had received, though even when the money was given to acquaintances in the form of a loan many recipients didn't feel any obligation to repay their debt.

By 2012, Adams had spent her winnings, having lost her money to gambling at the tables in Atlantic City casinos and a string of unsuccessful business deals.

In 2021, Adams died from an unknown illness at age 67.

== See also ==
- William Post (lottery winner)
- Jeffrey Dampier
- Jack Whittaker (lottery winner)
