= Evelyn Adams (rower) =

Australian rower

Personal information
- Nationality: Australian
- Born: 1950

Sport
- Sport: Rowing
- Club: Sydney Women's Rowing Club; Black Mountain Rowing Club

Achievements and titles
- National finals: Victoria Cup 1969-71,73,73,74; ULVA Trophy 1967,71,72,75,76; Nell Slatter Trophy 1977-79

Evelyn Adams (born 1950) née Gardiner and later Sommer, is an Australian pioneer representative rower. With Lydia Miladinovic she rowed in Australia's first international representative women's crew. A ten-time Australian national champion, accomplished as both a sculler and sweep-oarswoman, Adams' two World Rowing Championship appearances were made as a heavyweight whilst four of her Australian championship titles were achieved in the lightweight division. She represented at the 1974 World Rowing Championships and 1978 World Rowing Championships.

== Club and state rowing ==
An Abbottsford, Sydney local, Adams brought herself to rowing in 1965 when at one day at age 15 she enquired at the boatshed of the Sydney Women's Rowing Club. Her senior club rowing was from the Sydney Women's Rowing Club at a time when there was nil integration and little co-operation with the men's Sydney Rowing Club boatshed and clubhouse. After relocating to the ACT in 1986, Adams' rowing including her significant involvement in Masters competitions, has been from the Canberra's Black Mountain Rowing Club.

She began contesting national titles at Australian Rowing Championships from 1969. She won the gold and a national championship title in the junior scull in 1973, and in the coxless pair with Lydia Miladinovic in 1974. In 1975 she raced the coxless pair with Denise Phillips and in 1976 she raced as a lightweight, picking up silvers in both the junior scull and lightweight scull championship event. Her eligibility to race the junior scull in 1976 related to her inexperience as a sculler at that time rather than her age. In 1977 Adams raced in a coxed quad scull in SWRC colours. They won a national title in 1977 and took the silver in a coxless quad in 1978.

Adams was first honoured with New South Wales state selection in 1968 when she was picked to contest the ULVA Trophy for open-weight women's fours at the annual Interstate Regatta within the Australian Rowing Championships. She made further ULVA Trophy appearances for New South Wales in 1971, 1972, 1975 and 1976. Those NSW crews were victorious in 1967 and 1971 and took the silver in each other outing. In 1969, 1970, 1971, 1973 and 1974 she was also picked for New South to row in the women's lightweight four contesting the Victoria Cup at the Interstate Regatta. The 69, 71, 73 & 74 crews were victors, each time with Adams in the stroke seat. From 1977 to 1979 she was the New South Wales representative entrant to contest the Nell Slatter Trophy, the Interstate Championship in the women's open scull. She won those titles in 1977 and 1978.

== International representative rowing ==
In 1974 the NSW state championships were regarded as the unofficial selection trial for the 1974 World Rowing Championships. Adams had won interstate titles for NSW in lightweight fours in 1973 and 74 and paired up with Miladonovic to win the national title in the pair in 1974. They were selected to race at the 1974 World Championships in Lucerne which included the first ever world title events for women. They finished fourth in their heat, last in their repechage but raced the B final for an overall eleventh place regatta finish.

As the premier Australian sculler throughout 1977 and 1978 Adams was chosen to race the single scull at the 1978 World Rowing Championships on Lake Karapiro. She finished last in her heat, then qualified through the repechage to the B final where she finished last for an overall twelfth placing at the regatta.
