= Judd Proctor =

British jazz guitarist and session musician

Judd Proctor (né Procter; 2 January 1931 – 21 August 2020) was a British jazz guitarist and session musician.

== Biography ==
He was born in Doncaster, Yorkshire, in 1931, though some sources give different years. His birth surname was Procter (with an 'e'), but it was misspelled on early recordings and he later used the spelling with an 'o'. He played banjo in his youth, and joined a local trio, but switched to guitar when in his teens, and won a regional Melody Maker contest in a group, The Zetland Players. At the age of 18 he was conscripted into the Royal Air Force, based in Kent, where he met and was influenced by guitarist Ike Isaacs. After his military service ended, he worked in accountancy for British Rail, but soon left to join a dance band in Nottingham and became a professional musician.

After playing in various bands he joined Ray Ellington's quartet in 1955, and remained for six years. He appeared on many radio broadcasts including The Goon Show. In the early 1960s, he became a session musician, appearing on recordings by Cliff Richard, Helen Shapiro, The Springfields, Cilla Black, Serge Gainsbourg, Harry Nilsson and many others, including in later years the Benny Goodman Orchestra. He also made some instrumental recordings under his own name, including the 1961 single "Palamino" / "Nola", and a 1968 LP, Guitars Galore.

Proctor appeared on many television shows with stars such as Ella Fitzgerald, Sammy Davis Jr., and Victoria Wood, and on many film soundtracks. In the 1960s he toured with Stanley Black; in the 1970s and 1980s as a member of Don Lusher's orchestra; and later with the Bert Kaempfert Orchestra. His last and longest regular gig was providing incidental music for the TV comedy series Last of the Summer Wine.

He died in Market Deeping, Lincolnshire, in 2020 at the age of 89.
