= Serge Gainsbourg =

French musician and actor (1928–1991)

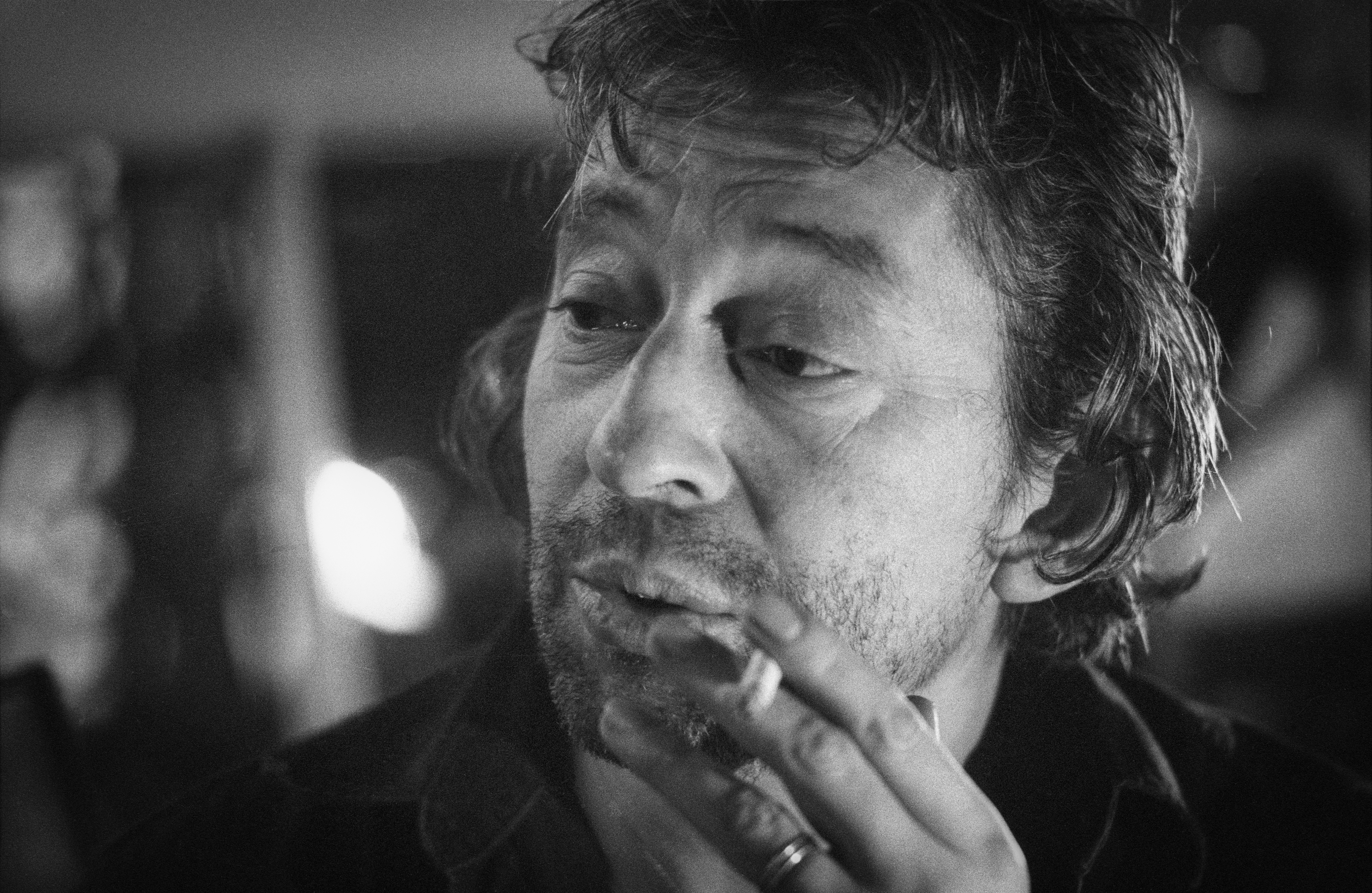
- Gainsbourg in 1981
- Born: Lucien Ginsburg; 2 April 1928; Paris, France
- Died: 2 March 1991 (aged 62); Paris, France
- Resting place: Montparnasse Cemetery, Paris
- Other names: Gainsbarre; Julien Gris; Julien Grix; L'homme à tête de chou
- Citizenship: French
- Education: Lycée Condorcet; ENMP
- Occupations: Singer; songwriter; actor; composer; director; author; poet
- Years active: 1957–1991
- Spouses: Elisabeth "Lize" Levitsky (m. 1951; div. 1957) Béatrice Pancrazzi (m. 1964; div. 1966)
- Partners: Jane Birkin (c. 1968; sep. 1980); Caroline Paulus (c. 1980)
- Children: 4, including Charlotte
- Awards: Victoire de la pochette de disques (Love on the Beat, 1985); Victoire de l'album (Love on the Beat, 1985); Victoire d'honneur (1990); César Award for Best Original Music (Élisa, 1996)
- Musical career
- Genres: French pop; rock; jazz
- Instruments: Vocals; piano; guitar
- Labels: Philips; Mercury; (Universal Music Group)

Serge Gainsbourg (French: [sɛʁʒ(ə) ɡɛ̃zbuʁ]; born Lucien Ginsburg; (Note: Ginsburg is sometimes spelled Ginzburg in the media, including print encyclopaedias and dictionaries. Ginsburg is however the spelling on Gainsbourg's grave; Lucien Ginsburg is the name by which Gainsbourg is referred to, as a performer, in the SACEM catalogue (along with Serge Gainsbourg as the author/composer/adaptor)) 2 April 1928 – 2 March 1991) was a French singer-songwriter, actor, composer, and director. Regarded as one of the most important figures in French pop, he was renowned for often provocative releases which caused uproar in France, dividing public opinion. His artistic output ranged from his early work in jazz, chanson, and yé-yé to later efforts in rock, zouk, funk, reggae, and electronica. Gainsbourg's varied musical style and individuality make him difficult to categorise, although his legacy has been firmly established and he is often regarded as one of the world's most influential popular musicians.

Gainsbourg wrote over 550 songs, which have been covered more than 1,000 times by diverse artists. His lyrical works incorporated wordplay, with humorous, bizarre, provocative, sexual, satirical or subversive overtones. Since his death from a second heart attack in 1991, Gainsbourg's music has reached legendary stature in France. While controversial in his lifetime, he has become one of France's best-loved public figures. He has also gained a cult following across the world with chart success in the United Kingdom and Belgium with "Je t'aime... moi non plus" and "Bonnie and Clyde", respectively.

== Biography ==
=== 1928–1956: Early years ===
Serge Gainsbourg was born in Paris on 2 April 1928, in the maternity ward of the Hôtel-Dieu de Paris on the Île de la Cité. He was the son of Russian Jewish émigrés, Joseph and Olga (Note: Short version: Olia, his mother's baptist name was Olga, as written on Gainsbourg's grave) Ginsburg.

Born Brucha Goda Besman (nicknamed Olia/Olga) in Feodosiya in 1894 to a Russian-Jewish family, Serge's mother was a mezzo-soprano singer. Serge's father Joseph was born in Constantinople in the Ottoman Empire of Ukrainian-Jewish descent in 1896. Originally interested in painting, he entered the Petrograd Conservatory and then the Moscow Conservatory to study music, becoming a classically trained pianist. He came to Crimea, where he met and married Olga in 1918. The couple fled Odessa for Paris via Georgia and then Istanbul in the years following the Russian Revolution. The couple arrived in Marseille in 1921, settling in Paris near Olga's brother, who worked for the Louis Dreyfus Bank. Joseph became a piano performer at bars, casinos, and cabarets, while Olga sang at the Conservatoire Rachmaninoff.

Serge and his twin sister Liliane had an elder brother Marcel, born in 1922, who died at sixteen months of pneumonia. They also had an older sister Jacqueline, born in 1926.

The family lived in the working-class districts of Paris, first at 35 Rue de la Chine in the 20th arrondissement, and then at 11 Rue Chaptal in the 9th arrondissement. They obtained French nationality in 1932. Joseph taught Serge and Liliane to play the piano. At age 12, Serge enrolled at the École Normale de Musique de Paris.

Gainsbourg's childhood was profoundly affected by the occupation of France by Germany during World War II. The identifying yellow star that Jews were required to wear haunted Gainsbourg; in later years he was able to transmute this memory into creative inspiration. Early in the summer of 1941, the family temporarily sought refuge in the commune of Courgenard in the Sarthe department, at a place called "La Bassetière," with Baptiste and Irma Dumur.

During the occupation, as artistic professions were forbidden to Jews, his pianist father crossed to Limoges in 1942. At the time, Limoges was part of zone libre, an area of France governed by the Vichy regime that was not occupied by Germany, but it became unsafe for Jews after Germany eventually occupied the area in 1942. As police raids became more frequent, in January 1944, the rest of the family joined him, using forged documents. The family took refuge in the town of Grand Vedeix in the commune of Saint Cyr in the Haute-Vienne department, using the name Guimbard. Jacqueline and Liliane were hidden with the nuns of the Sacré-Cœur school in Limoges and Lucien (Serge) in a public college, in Saint-Léonard-de-Noblat. He remained a boarder there for six months under his false identity. One evening, the Gestapo raided the establishment to check that no Jewish children were hiding there. Warned, the boarding school officials sent him to hide alone in the forest, equipped with an axe to defend himself, where he spent the entire night in fear of being caught and killed.

After the liberation of Paris, the family returned, living at 55 Avenue Bugeaud in the 16th arrondissement. Serge attended Lycée Condorcet in Paris, but dropped out before completing his Baccalauréat. In 1945, Gainsbourg's father enrolled him in Beaux-Arts de Paris, a prestigious art school. Serge later transferred to the Académie de Montmartre, where his professors included the likes of André Lhote and Fernand Léger. There, Gainsbourg met his first wife, Elisabeth "Lize" Levitsky, the daughter of Russian aristocrats and a part-time model. Serge and Lize were married on November 3, 1951, and the marriage ended in divorce in 1957.

In 1948, Serge was conscripted by the military for twelve months of service in Courbevoie. He never saw action, spending his time playing dirty songs on guitar, visiting prostitutes, and drinking. Serge later claimed that the military service turned him into an alcoholic. Gainsbourg obtained work teaching music and painting at a school in Le Mesnil-le-Roi, just outside of Paris. The school was founded under the auspices of local rabbis to serve the orphaned children of murdered deportees. Here, Gainsbourg heard accounts of Nazi Germany's acts of persecution and genocide, and these stories inspired his songwriting several decades later.

=== 1957–1963: Early work as a pianist and chanson singer ===
Gainsbourg was disillusioned with his school painting gig and instead moved on to working odd jobs playing the piano in bars, usually as a stand-in for his father. He soon became the venue pianist at the drag cabaret club Madame Arthur. Whilst filling in a form to join the songwriting society SACEM, Gainsbourg decided to change his first name to Serge. According to his future partner Jane Birkin, "Lucien reminded him of a hairdresser's assistant." He chose Gainsbourg as his last name, an homage to the English painter Thomas Gainsborough, whom he admired.

Gainsbourg had a revelation when he saw Boris Vian performing at the Milord l'Arsouille club, whose provocative and humorous songs would influence Serge's own compositions. At the Milord l'Arsouille, Gainsbourg accompanied singer and club star Michèle Arnaud on the guitar. In 1957, Arnaud and the club's director Francis Claude discovered Gainsbourg's compositions while visiting his home to see his paintings. The next day, Claude urged Gainsbourg to perform on stage on his own. Despite his stage fright, Gainsbourg performed his own repertoire, including "Le Poinçonneur des Lilas," which describes a day in the life of a Paris Métro ticket man, whose job is to validate passenger tickets by stamping holes in them. In the song, the job is described as so monotonous, that the ticket man eventually thinks of putting a hole through his head and being buried in another hole. After the debut, Serge was given a steady performance segment at the club, where he was eventually spotted by talent agent Jacques Canetti, who helped advance Gainsbourg's career with a regular performance segment at the Théâtre des Trois Baudets, as well as by touring. In 1958, Arnaud began recording several interpretations of Gainsbourg's songs.

His debut album, Du chant à la une !... (1958), was recorded in the summer of 1958, backed by arranger Alain Goraguer and his orchestra, beginning a fruitful collaboration. It was released in September, becoming a commercial and critical failure, despite winning the grand prize at L'Academie Charles Cross and the praise of Boris Vian, who compared him to Cole Porter. His next album, N° 2 (1959), suffered a similar fate. He made his film debut in 1959 with a supporting role in the French-Italian co-production Come Dance with Me, starring his future lover Brigitte Bardot. In the following year, he featured as a Roman officer in the Italian sword-and-sandals epic-film The Revolt of the Slaves. He would continue playing "nasty characters" in similar productions, including Samson (1961) and The Fury of Hercules (1962). Gainsbourg's first commercial success came in 1960 with his single "L'Eau à la bouche", the title song from the film of the same name, for which he had composed the score. L'Étonnant Serge Gainsbourg (1961), his third LP, included what would become one of his best known songs from this period, "La Chanson de Prévert", which lifted lyrics from the Jacques Prévert poem "Les feuilles mortes". After a night of drinking champagne and dancing with singer Juliette Gréco, Gainsbourg went home and wrote "La Javanaise" for her. They would both release versions of the song in 1962, but it is Gainsbourg's rendition that has endured. His fourth album, Serge Gainsbourg N° 4 was released in 1962, incorporating Latin and rock and roll influences whilst his next, Gainsbourg Confidentiel (1963), featured a more minimalistic jazz approach, accompanied only by a double bass and electric guitar.

=== 1963–1966: Eurovision and involvement in the yé-yé movement ===
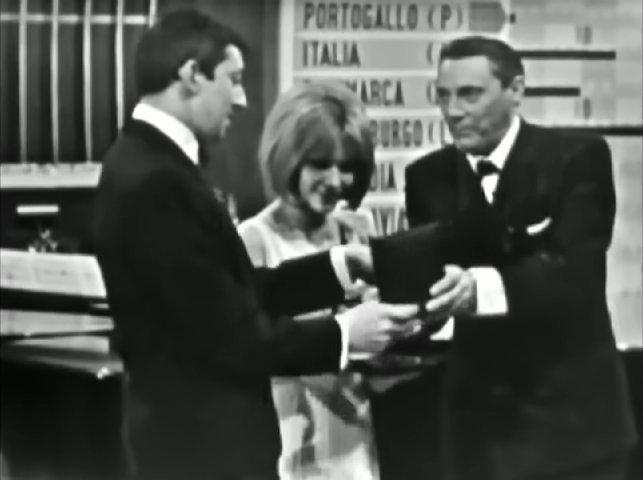
Gainsbourg, Gall, and del Monaco at the Eurovision Song Contest, 20 March 1965

Despite initially mocking yé-yé, a style of French pop typically sung by young female singers, Gainsbourg would soon become one of its most important figures after writing a string of hits for artists like Brigitte Bardot, Petula Clark and France Gall. He had met Gall after being introduced by a friend as they were Philips Records labelmates, thus beginning a successful collaboration that would produce hits like "N'écoute pas les idoles", the frequently covered "Laisse tomber les filles", and "Poupée de cire, poupée de son", the latter of which was the Luxembourgish winning entry at the Eurovision Song Contest 1965. Inspired by the 4th movement (Prestissimo in F minor) from Beethoven's Piano Sonata No. 1, the song featured double entendres and wordplay, a staple of Gainsbourg's lyrics. The controversially risqué "Les sucettes" ("Lollipops"), featured references to oral sex, unbeknownst to the 18-year-old Gall, who thought the song was about lollipops. In 2001, Gall expressed displeasure at Gainsbourg's earlier antics, stating she felt "betrayed by the adults around me."

Gainsbourg married a second time on 7 January 1964, to Françoise-Antoinette "Béatrice" Pancrazzi, with whom he had two children: a daughter named Natacha (b. 8 August 1964) and a son, Paul (born in spring 1968). He divorced Béatrice in February 1966.

His next album, Gainsbourg Percussions (1964), was inspired by the rhythms and melodies of African musicians Miriam Makeba and Babatunde Olatunji. Olatunji later sued Gainsbourg for lifting three tracks from his 1960 album Drums of Passion. Nevertheless, the album has been hailed as being ahead of its time for its incorporation of world music and lyrical content depicting interracial love. Between 1965 and 1966, Gainsbourg composed the music and sang the words of science fiction writer André Ruellan for several songs made for a series of animated Marie-Mathematics shorts created by Jean-Claude Forest. He would reunite with Michèle Arnaud for the duet "Les Papillons noirs" from her 1966 comeback record.

=== 1967–1970: Famous muses and duets ===
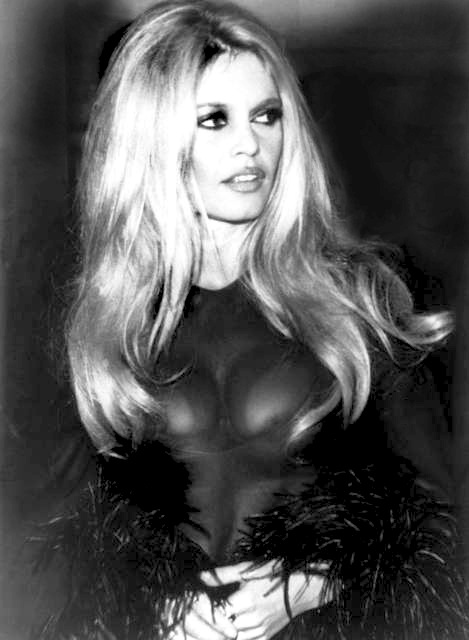
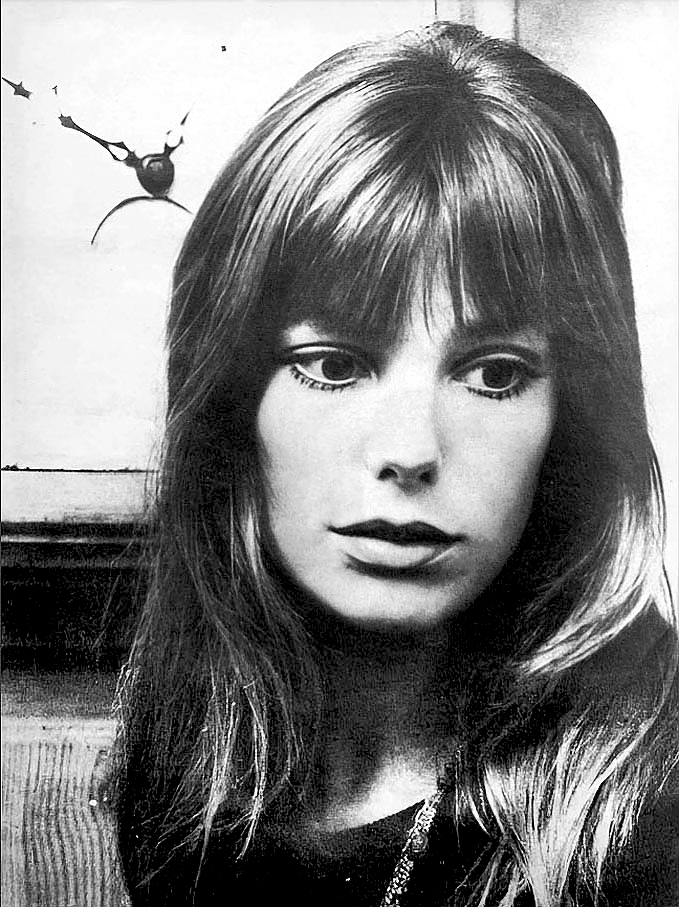
Bardot (left) pictured in 1968 and Birkin pictured in 1970

In 1967, Gainsbourg wrote the script and provided the soundtrack for the musical comedy television film Anna starring Anna Karina in the titular role. That same year, he composed the military march "The Sand and the Soldier" for the Israel Defense Forces. Another Gainsbourg song, "Boum-Badaboum" by Minouche Barelli, was entered by Monaco in the Eurovision Song Contest 1967, coming in fifth place. In that year, Gainsbourg would have a brief but ardent love affair with Brigitte Bardot. One day she asked him to write the most beautiful love song he could imagine and, that night, he wrote the duets "Je t'aime... moi non plus" and "Bonnie and Clyde" for her. The erotic yet cynical "Je t'aime", describing the hopelessness of physical love, was recorded by the pair in a small glass booth in Paris but after Bardot's husband, German businessman Gunter Sachs, became aware of the recording, he demanded it be withdrawn. Bardot pleaded with Gainsbourg not to release it, and he complied.

Bardot's LP Brigitte Bardot Show 67 contained four songs penned by Gainsbourg, including duets such as the playful "Comic Strip" and the string-laden "Bonnie and Clyde", which tells the story of the American criminal couple and was based on a poem written by Bonnie Parker herself. His own Initials B.B. (1968) included these duets and was his first album in nearly four years. It blended orchestral pop with the style of rock characteristic of London in the Swinging Sixties, where the album was largely recorded. Gainsbourg borrowed heavily from Antonín Dvořák's New World Symphony for the title track, named after and dedicated to Bardot. Phillips subsidiary Fontana Records also issued the compilation LP Bonnie and Clyde (1968) comprising their duets and other previously recorded material.

His percussion-heavy 1968 single "Requiem pour un con" was performed onscreen by Gainsbourg in the crime film Le Pacha, for which he was the composer. Shortly after being left by Bardot, Gainsbourg was asked by Françoise Hardy to write a French version of the song "It Hurts to Say Goodbye". The result was "Comment te dire adieu", which is notable for its uncommon rhymes and has become one of Hardy's signature songs.

In mid-1968 Gainsbourg started a relationship with English singer and actress Jane Birkin, 18 years his junior, whom he met when she was cast as his co-star in Slogan (1969). In the film, Gainsbourg starred as a commercial director who has an affair behind the back of his pregnant wife with a younger woman, played by Birkin. Gainsbourg also provided the soundtrack and dueted with Birkin on the title theme "La Chanson de Slogan". The relationship would last for over a decade. In July 1971 they had a daughter, Charlotte, who would become an actress and singer. Although many sources state that they were married, according to Charlotte this was not the case. After filming Slogan, Gainsbourg asked Birkin to re-record "Je t'aime..." with him. Her vocals were an octave higher than Bardot's, contained suggestive heavy breathing and culminated in simulated orgasm sounds. Released in February 1969, the song topped the UK Singles Chart after being temporarily banned due to its overtly sexual content. It was banned from the radio in several other countries, including Spain, Sweden, Italy and France before 11pm. The song was even publicly denounced by The Vatican. It was included on the joint album Jane Birkin/Serge Gainsbourg, which also contained "Élisa" and new recordings of songs written for other artists including "Les sucettes", "L'anamour" and "Sous le soleil exactement". In 2017, Pitchfork named it the 44th best album of the 1960s. He and Birkin would share the screen in another Gainsbourg-scored film, Cannabis (1970), in which he played an American gangster who falls in love with a girl from a wealthy family.

=== 1971–1977: Concept albums ===
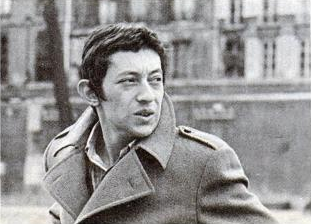
Gainsbourg in 1971

Following the success of "Je t'aime... moi non plus", his record company had expected Gainsbourg to produce another hit. But after having already made a fortune, he was uninterested, deciding to "move onto something serious". The result was his 1971 concept album Histoire de Melody Nelson, which tells the story of an illicit relationship between the narrator and the teenage Melody Nelson after running her over in his Rolls-Royce Silver Ghost. The album heavily features Gainsbourg's distinctive half-spoken, half-sung vocal delivery, loose drums, guitar, and bass evoking funk music, and lush string and choral arrangements by Jean-Claude Vannier. Despite only selling around 15,000 copies upon release, it has become highly influential and is often considered his magnum opus. An accompanying television special starring Gainsbourg and Birkin was also broadcast.

He suffered a heart attack in May 1973, but refused to cut back on his smoking and drinking. Gainsbourg's next record Vu de l'extérieur (1973) was not strictly a concept album like its predecessor and follow-ups, despite its focus on scatology throughout. It largely failed to connect with critics and listeners. In that year, Gainsbourg also wrote all of the tracks on Birkin's debut solo album Di doo dah and he would continue to write for her until his death. In 1975, Gainsbourg released the darkly comic album Rock Around the Bunker, performed in an upbeat 1950s rock and roll style and written on the subject of Nazi Germany and the Second World War, drawing from his experiences as a Jewish child in occupied France. The next year saw the release of yet another concept album, L'Homme à tête de chou (The Cabbage Head Man), a nickname used by Gainsbourg himself in reference to his large ears. This album marked Gainsbourg's first foray into the Jamaican reggae genre, a style he would revisit for his next two albums.

In 1976, Gainsbourg also made his directorial debut with Je t'aime moi non plus, an offbeat drama named after his song of the same name. It starred Birkin in the lead role, with American actor Joe Dallesandro playing the gay man she falls in love with. The film received positive critical notices from the French press and acclaimed director François Truffaut. Having previously turned down the offer to score the popular softcore pornography film Emmanuelle (1974), he agreed to do so for one of its sequels Goodbye Emmanuelle in 1977.

=== 1978–1981: Reggae period ===
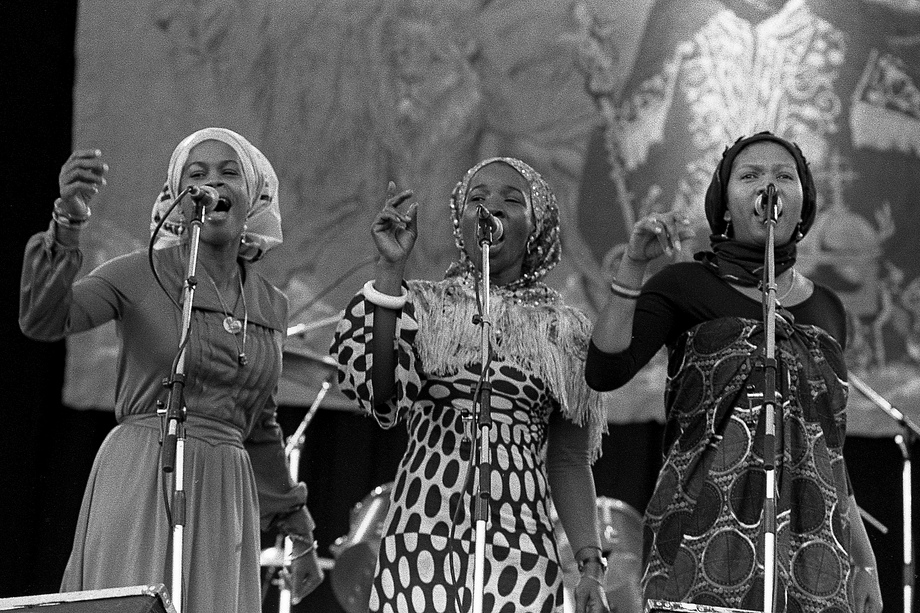
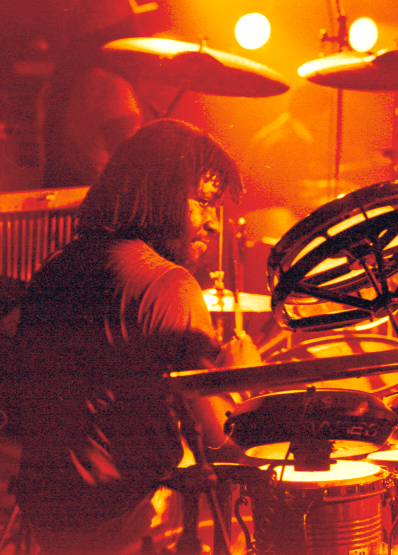
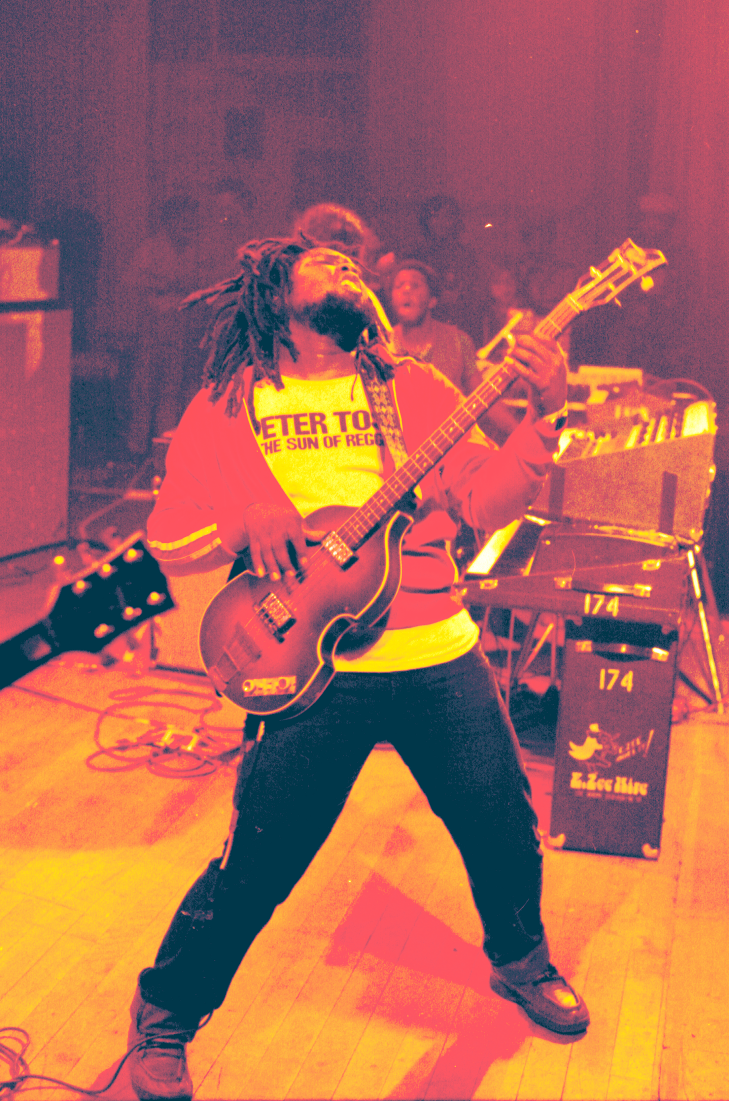
The I Threes and Sly and Robbie pictured between 1979 and 1980

In 1978, Gainsbourg dropped plans to record another concept album and contacted several Jamaican musicians including rhythm section players Sly and Robbie with the intention of recording a reggae album. He set off for Kingston, Jamaica in September to begin recording Aux armes et cætera (1979) with the likes of Sly and Robbie and the female backing singers The I-Threes of Bob Marley and the Wailers; thus making him the first white musician to record such an album in Jamaica. The album was immensely popular, achieving platinum status for selling over one million copies. But it was not without controversy, as the title track—a reggae version of the French national anthem "La Marseillaise"—received harsh criticism in the newspaper Le Figaro from Michel Droit, who condemned the song and opined that it may cause a rise in antisemitism. Gainsbourg also received death threats from right-wing veteran soldiers of the Algerian War of Independence, who were opposed to their national anthem being arranged in reggae style. In 1979, a show had to be cancelled, because an angry mob of French Army parachutists came to demonstrate in the audience. Alone onstage, Gainsbourg raised his fist and answered: "The true meaning of our national anthem is revolutionary" and sang it a cappella with the audience.

Birkin left Gainsbourg in 1980, but the two remained close, with Gainsbourg becoming the godfather of Birkin and Jacques Doillon's daughter Lou and writing her next three albums. His first live album Enregistrement public au Théâtre Le Palace (1980), exhibited his reggae-influenced style at the time. Also in 1980, Gainsbourg dueted with actress Catherine Deneuve on the hit song "Dieu fumeur de havanes" from the film Je vous aime and published a novella entitled Evguénie Sokolov, the tale of an avant-garde painter who exploits his flatulence by creating a style known as "gasograms". His final reggae recording, Mauvaises nouvelles des étoiles (1981), was recorded at Compass Point Studios in The Bahamas with the same personnel as its predecessor. Bob Marley, husband to The I Threes singer Rita Marley, was reportedly furious when he discovered that Gainsbourg had made his wife Rita sing erotic lyrics. New posthumous dub mixes of Aux armes et cætera and Mauvaises Nouvelles des Étoiles were released in 2003. During this period, Gainsbourg also had success writing material for other artists, most notably "Manureva" for Alain Chamfort, a tribute to French sailor Alain Colas and the titular trimaran he disappeared at sea with.

=== 1982–1991: Final years, Eurovision Again and death ===
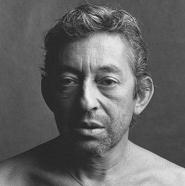
Gainsbourg in 1982

In 1982, Gainsbourg contributed his songwriting to French rock singer Alain Bashung's fourth studio album Play blessures, which was a left turn creatively for Bashung and is often considered a cult classic despite negative contemporary reviews. His second film as a director, Équateur (1983), was adapted from the 1933 novel Tropic Moon by Belgian writer Georges Simenon and is set in colonialist French Equatorial Africa.

Love on the Beat (1984) saw Gainsbourg move on from reggae and onto a more electronic, new wave inspired sound. The album is known for addressing taboo sexual subject matters, with Gainsbourg dressed in drag on the cover and the highly controversial duet with his daughter Charlotte, "Lemon Incest", which seemed to clearly refer to his fantasy of wanting to make love to his child. The music video for the song featured a half-naked Gainsbourg lying on a bed with Charlotte, leading to further controversy. Nevertheless, it was Gainsbourg's highest-charting song in France. In March 1984, he illegally burned three-quarters of a 500-French-franc bill on television to protest against taxes rising up to 74% of income. In April 1986, on Michel Drucker's live Saturday evening television show "Champs-Élysées" on Antenne 2, with the American singer Whitney Houston, he objected to Drucker's translating his comments to Houston and, in English, stated: "I said, I want to fuck her"—Drucker, utterly embarrassed, insisted that this meant "He says you are great..." That same year, on the Canal+ talk show "Mon Zénith à moi," he appeared alongside Les Rita Mitsouko singer Catherine Ringer. Gainsbourg spat out at her, "You're nothing but a filthy whore" to which Ringer replied, "Look at you, you're just a bitter old alcoholic... you've become a disgusting old parasite."

Gainsbourg's final partner until his death was the model Caroline Paulus, better known by her stage name Bambou. They had a son, Lucien (b. 5 January 1986), who now goes by the name Lulu and is a musician. His 1986 film Charlotte for Ever further expanded on the themes found in "Lemon Incest". He starred in the film alongside Charlotte as a widowed, alcoholic father living with his daughter. An album of the same name by Charlotte was also written by Gainsbourg.

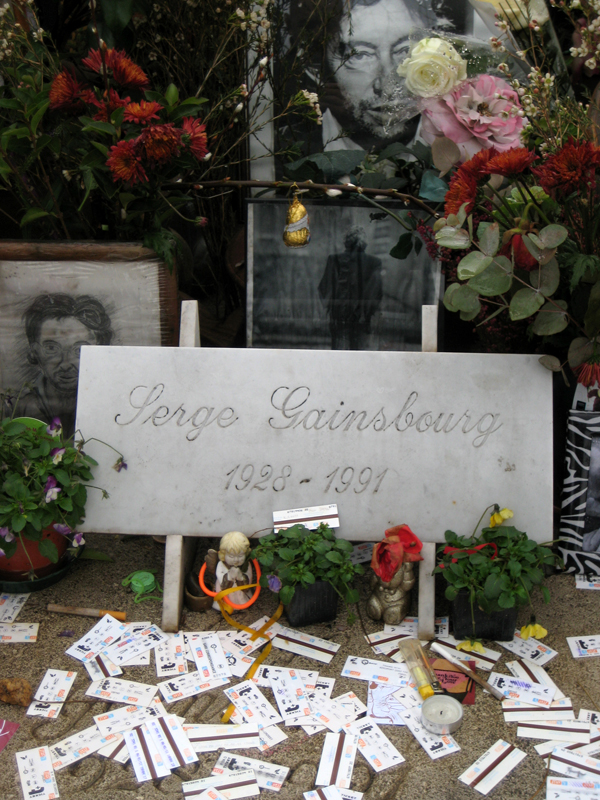
Tributes left at his gravesite

His sixteenth and final studio album, You're Under Arrest (1987), largely retained the funky new wave sound of Love on the Beat, but also introduced hip-hop elements. A return to concept albums for Gainsbourg, it tells the story of an unnamed narrator and his drug-addicted girlfriend in New York City. The album's anti-drug message was exemplified by the single "Aux enfants de la chance".

In November 1988, Gainsbourg appeared on the show Sébastien c'est fou ! on TF1, and was surprised by the Petits Chanteurs d'Asnières boys' choir, who dressed up as him, with sunglasses, sport coats, jeans, painted-on stubble, and prop cigarettes and whiskey glasses; they sang "Je suis venu te dire que je m'en vais" ('I came to tell you that I'm leaving'), changing the words to "On est venu te dire qu’on t’aime bien" ('We came to tell you that we love you'). A clip of the performance, in which Gainsbourg appeared to be deeply moved by the children's tribute, went viral on the Internet in 2023–24, inspiring Halloween costumes and Internet memes.

In December 1988, while a judge at a film festival in Val d'Isère, he was extremely intoxicated at a local theatre where he was to do a presentation. While on stage he began to tell an obscene story about Brigitte Bardot and a champagne bottle, only to stagger offstage and collapse in a nearby seat. Subsequent years saw his health deteriorate, undergoing liver surgery in April 1989. In his ill health, he retired to a private apartment in Vézelay in July 1990, where he would spend six months. He continued to write for other artists, including the lyrics to "White and Black Blues" by Joëlle Ursull, the French entry in the Eurovision Song Contest 1990, coming in second place. He similarly wrote all of the lyrics for popular singer Vanessa Paradis's album Variations sur le même t'aime (1990), declaring "Paradis is hell" after its release. His final film, Stan the Flasher, starred Claude Berri as an English teacher who engages in exhibitionism. Gainsbourg's last album of original material was Birkin's Amours des feintes in 1990.

Gainsbourg, who smoked five packs of unfiltered Gitanes cigarettes a day, died from a heart attack at his home on 2 March 1991, aged 62. His funeral was attended by Catherine Deneuve, Johnny Hallyday, and Isabelle Adjani. He was buried in the Jewish section of the Montparnasse Cemetery in Paris. French President François Mitterrand paid tribute by saying, "He was our Baudelaire, our Apollinaire ... He elevated the song to the level of art." In her first interview after her father's death, his daughter Charlotte told Vanity Fair: "He was a poet. What he did was way ahead of its time. You can just read his lyrics—he plays with words in such a way that there are double meanings that don't work out in English. He was just so very authentic. He was so shy, and very touching. And he was very generous. Every time I get into a taxi [in Paris] I hear a story about my father, because he used to take taxis all day long and [the drivers] tell me how sweet he was. One day a taxi driver told me my father had paid for his teeth to be mended; somebody else's roof needed to be mended and he paid for that. He just had real relationships with people from the street. He was selfish in ways that artists can be, but there was no snobism. He was always amazed at the fact that he had money. I remember going to lovely hotels with him and he was like . . . 'Oooh, how fun this is.' He had the eyes of a child."

== Legacy and influence ==
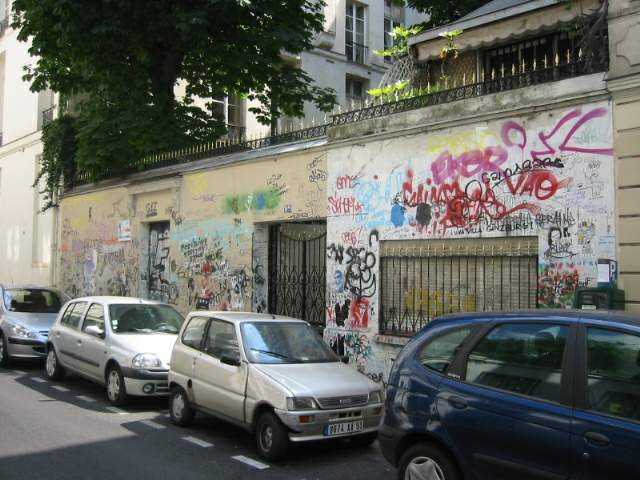
Tribute graffiti covers the outer wall of Serge Gainsbourg's house on the rue de Verneuil in Paris, looked after by Charlotte Gainsbourg after her father's death

Since his death, Gainsbourg's music has reached legendary stature in France. In his native country, artists like the bands Air, Stereolab and BB Brunes (who named themselves after Gainsbourg's song "Initials B.B."), singers Benjamin Biolay, Vincent Delerm, Thomas Fersen and Arthur H have cited him as an influence. He has also gained a following in the English-speaking world from artists like Jarvis Cocker of Pulp, Beck, Michael Stipe of R.E.M., Alex Turner of Arctic Monkeys, Portishead, Massive Attack, Mike Patton of Faith No More and Neil Hannon of The Divine Comedy. Nick Cave and the Bad Seeds guitarist Mick Harvey has recorded four cover albums sung in English and he is referenced by name in the song "Aloo Gobi" by American rock band Weezer. Gainsbourg's music has been sampled by several hip hop artists, including songs by Nas, Wu-Tang Clan, Busta Rhymes and MC Solaar.

The Parisian house in which Gainsbourg lived from 1969 until 1991, at 5 bis Rue de Verneuil, remains a celebrated shrine, with his ashtrays and collections of various items, such as police badges and bullets, intact. The outside of the house is covered in graffiti dedicated to Gainsbourg, as well as with photographs of significant figures in his life, including Bardot and Birkin. In 2008, Paris's Cité de la Musique held the Gainsbourg 2008 exhibition, curated by sound artist Frédéric Sanchez.

Gainsbourg has been described as an unlikely sex symbol and fashion icon, noted for his sharp suits, white Repetto shoes, double-denim, green United States Army shirts and pinstripe jackets.

Comic artist Joann Sfar wrote and directed the biographical film of his life Gainsbourg (Vie héroïque) (2010). Gainsbourg is portrayed by Eric Elmosnino as an adult and Kacey Mottet Klein as a child. The film won three César Awards, including Best Actor for Elmosnino, and was nominated for an additional eight.

== Discography ==
Studio albums

- Du chant à la une !... (1958)
- N° 2 (1959)
- L'Étonnant Serge Gainsbourg (1961)
- Serge Gainsbourg N° 4 (1962)
- Gainsbourg Confidentiel (1964)
- Gainsbourg Percussions (1964)
- Initials B.B. (1968)
- Jane Birkin/Serge Gainsbourg (1969)
- Histoire de Melody Nelson (1971)
- Vu de l'extérieur (1973)
- Rock Around the Bunker (1975)
- L'Homme à tête de chou (1976)
- Aux armes et cætera (1979)
- Mauvaises nouvelles des étoiles (1981)
- Love on the Beat (1984)
- You're Under Arrest (1987)

== Filmography as director ==
- Je t'aime moi non plus (1976)
- Équateur (1983)
- Charlotte for Ever (1986)
- Springtime in Bourges (1987)
- Stan the Flasher (1990)

== Notes and references ==
=== Sources ===
- Simmons, Sylvie (2001). Serge Gainsbourg: A Fistful of Gitanes. London: Helter Skelter Publishing. ISBN 1-900924-28-5.
- Clayson, Alan (1998). Serge Gainsbourg: View From The Exterior. London: Sanctuary. ISBN 978-1-86074-222-4.
