= Walter Carone =

Italian-French photographer (1920–1982)

Walter Carone (left) with Jean Cocteau and Joseph Cotten

Walter Carone (1920–1982) was an Italian-French photographer. Between 1945 and mid 1960s he produced more than 10,000 quality photographs for various French publishers. He was known for his portraits of celebrities, and the coverage of early Cannes Film Festivals.

Carone learned photography from his father, who immigrated from Italy to Cannes, France. In 1945 Carone moved to Paris, where he worked for Cinévie, France Dimanche, Point de Vue, Elle and finally for Paris Match, which hired him three months before its re-opening in 1949. Carone eventually became a deputy head of the photography department of Paris Match, and later helped launching the magazines Photo and Photo Journal.
