= Les Choses humaines =

2019 novel by Karine Tuil

- First edition with bandeau
- Author: Karine Tuil
- Audio read by: Constance Dollé
- Language: French
- Publisher: Éditions Gallimard
- Publication date: 22 August 2019
- Publication place: Paris
- Media type: Print (paperback)
- Pages: 352
- ISBN: 978-2-07-272933-1
- OCLC: 1108701824
- LC Class: PQ2680.U48 C46 2019

Les Choses humaines (lit. 'Human Things') is the eleventh novel by French author Karine Tuil, published by Éditions Gallimard on 22 August 2019. It was awarded the Prix Interallié and Prix Goncourt des lycéens. In 2021, the novel was adapted into a film of the same name. The novel has not yet received an English translation.

== Summary ==
Veteran journalist Jean Farel and his wife Claire Farel, an outspoken feminist, have a son, Alexandre, an accomplished student who is preparing to study at Stanford University. However, everything changes when their prodigious son finds himself accused of rape by Mila, the daughter of his mother's new boyfriend. The families find their private lives interrupted equally as much as their public lives, with the media reporting the case.

Jean Farel invites family, friends and colleagues to his decoration ceremony by the president, at the Élysée, in the summer of 2016. In the hour before, an incriminating article appears against him in the newspaper where his lover Françoise works and a message informs him that Françoise has been hospitalized after a suicide attempt.

One day, Jean is assaulted by two bikers when crossing the Champs-Élysées. The evening when Alexandre was assigned by his mother (and her new boyfriend, Adam) to escort Mila, ended with their separation. Shortly after waking up at his father's apartment, Alexandre is confronted with police who have been ordered to carry out a search, on a complaint of rape. As he prepares to return for Stanford, he is arrested. Alexandre chooses his court-appointed lawyer, Maître Arthur Célérier, over the famous and talented Bruno Cancel, provided by his father.

In 2018, Jean has divorced Claire and remarried his young intern Quitterie, with whom he has a young daughter named Anita. Claire is separated from Jean and Adam, preoccupied only with her son. Jean and Claire are reunited for the trial, in a #BalanceTonPorc and post-Weinstein atmosphere. Mila is defended by Maître Denis Rozenberg and Maître Juliette Ferré, at a trial presided over by Année Collet. The only last-minute witness is Kamel Alaoui.

== Characters ==
- Alexandre Farel, the 21-year-old son of Claire and Jean Farel, an engineering graduate of the École polytechnique and current student at Stanford University
- Claire Farel, a 44-year-old journalist, the daughter of Dan Davis and Marie Coulier
- Jean Farel, a 70-year-old journalist and media personality. He is the longtime host of the popular programme Grand Oral. Farel came from humble beginnings, born the son of a drug-addicted prostitute who had four sons by three different fathers and was raised squatting in the 18th arrondissement. At 9 years old, Jean found his mother dead. He and his brothers were placed in the DDASS before he and his younger brother Léo were adopted by foster parents. Without any diploma, Jean began as an ORTF trainee and diligently worked his way through the media industry into a successful career in broadcasting.
- Françoise Merle, a 68-year-old journalist and Jean's mistress of eighteen years
- Mila Wizman, 18 years old, daughter of Valérie and Adam, older sister of Noa
- Adam Wizman, a 42-year-old French teacher of a Jewish school located in the neuf-trois
- Valérie Berdah, later known as Sarah, a dental technician

== Writing ==
The novel is inspired by a high-profile American criminal case which took place in 2016 and focused on a sexual assault and rape which took place on the Stanford University campus. Brock Turner, a student at the prestigious American university, raped an unconscious 23-year-old woman on 18 January 2015. He was convicted in March 2016 and sentenced on 2 June 2016. He risked up to 7 years in prison but was only sentenced to six months because according to the judge, Aaron Persky, a prison sentence would have had too severe an impact on the student. A letter from Brock Turner's father to the court, a petition against the judge, as well as the text published online by BuzzFeed of the victim's impact statement drew national and international media attention.

Karine Tuil claims to have discussed the case with lawyers, before attending rape trials at the cour d'assises in Paris. These experiences would serve as Tuil's research "laboratory" for the foundation of her novel.

== Publication ==
Les Choses humaines was first published by Éditions Gallimard in paperback format on 22 August 2019. It was published in Collection Blanche, the foremost editorial collection of Éditions Gallimard. An audiobook edition, narrated by Constance Dollé, was released the same day. A second edition was published in Éditions Gallimard's Collection Folio on 7 January 2021.

== Reception ==
Some reviewers found the novel particularly interesting in its portrayal of today's society. Adrien Corbeel, writing for the RTBF, said the book evoked an "ambiguous portrait of our society". Valérie de Swetschin characterised the book as "an X-ray of our time", which she deemed simultaneously disturbing, fascinating and essential. In Libération, Victor Belin, president of the jury of the 2019 Prix Goncourt des lycéens, characterised Les Choses humaines as an "outstanding work that seems essential to read in our time". In the France Inter radio programme Le Masque et la Plume, literary critics Olivia de Lamberterie and Jean-Claude Raspiengeas described the novel as "intelligent" and praised its topical and revelatory qualities.

Other reviewers criticised the writing style of the novel. Jérôme Langlois deemed it "featureless", and felt the story was too predictable. Many critics criticised Karine Tuil for having seized the newsworthiness of the #MeToo movement and drew from it a dull novel, without any revelations in its story. Nelly Kapriélian declared, "This way of riding every current trend, it starts to become opportunistic". Frédéric Beigbeder adds in Le masque et la Plume that the novel is "cliché" and "the characters are caricatures".

== Literary awards and sales ==
Les Choses humaines was a finalist in the first selections for the Prix Goncourt and the Prix Femina. The novel became a finalist in the third selection for the 2019 Prix Interallié, which it ultimately received on 13 November 2019, winning in the first round of voting by five votes against three to L'Île du dernier homme by Bruno de Cessole and two to Où vont les fils ? by Olivier Frébourg. The newspaper Libération notes that Tuil was the only woman to win one of the six major literary prizes of the 2019 French literary season. The Prix Interallié was awarded to Tuil the same day during a reception at the Parisian restaurant Lasserre. Florian Zeller, a juror, explained that the novel seduced the jury because it examines a contemporary subject with courage and talent. Another juror, Gilles Martin-Chauffier, said, "Les Choses humaines, like Bruno de Cessole's book, deciphers our world: the authors put their fingers on the wounds of our society". Other jurors recognized that in awarding Tuil's eleventh novel, it is thus a "work patiently evoked over many years". Juror Jean-Marie Rouart recalled receiving a manuscript from a young woman in 2000. Seduced by its prose, Rouart sent the book to Éditions Gallimard, who rejected it, then to Éditions Grasset, another rejection. The book, Tuil's debut novel Pour le pire, was ultimately published by Plon. The next day, 14 November, the novel also received the Prix Goncourt des lycéens, winning in the first round by seven votes against five to Mur Méditerranée by Haitian writer Louis-Philippe Dalembert.

Before receiving these literary prizes, the novel had already sold 34,000 copies. As of 2022, the novel had sold over 300,000 copies.

== Film adaptation ==
In 2021, Yvan Attal directed a film adaptation from a screenplay he wrote with Yaël Langmann. The film stars Attal's son Ben Attal in the role of Alexandre Farel, Suzanne Jouannet as Mila Wizman, Charlotte Gainsbourg as Claire Farel, Mathieu Kassovitz as Adam Wizman, Pierre Arditi as Jean Farel, and Audrey Dana as Valérie Berdah. It premiered at the 78th Venice International Film Festival in September 2021. Attal and Langmann received a nomination for Best Adaptation at the 47th César Awards.
