= Love, Etc. =

Love, etc. may refer to:

- Love, etc, a 1996 Marion Vernoux film based on the 1991 novel Talking It Over
- Love, Etc (novel), a 2000 novel by Julian Barnes
- "Love Etc." (song), a 2009 single by Pet Shop Boys
