= Lemon Incest =

Single by Serge and Charlotte Gainsbourg

from the album Love on the Beat and Charlotte for Ever
- B-side: "Hmm Hmm Hmm"
- Released: 1985
- Recorded: 1984
- Genre: Pop
- Length: 5:12
- Label: Philips
- Songwriters: Serge Gainsbourg; Frédéric Chopin
- Producers: Philippe Lerichomme; Billy Rush

Serge Gainsbourg singles chronology
"Love on the Beat" (1984)	"Lemon Incest" (1985)	"No Comment" (1985)

Charlotte Gainsbourg singles chronology
"Lemon Incest" (1985)	"If" (2004)

"Lemon Incest" is a song recorded by French father and daughter Serge and Charlotte Gainsbourg. It was recorded in 1984 and released as a single from Serge's 1985 album Love on the Beat and on Charlotte's 1986 debut album Charlotte for Ever, marking her musical debut. It is a pop song about a relationship between Serge and Charlotte, the latter of whom was 12 or 13 years old at the time, set to the melody of Frédéric Chopin's Étude Op. 10, No. 3. Its title is a play on the French term un zeste de citron, which translates to lemon zest in English.

"Lemon Incest" and its music video, which showed Serge and Charlotte half-naked together in bed, were highly controversial in France due to their implications of pedophilia and incest. As an adult, Charlotte routinely defended the song, which both she and Serge have denied was about incest. Retrospective reviews of the song have been generally negative, with some critics describing the lyrics as disturbing and the song as creepy. It peaked at number two in France, where it spent 14 weeks on the Syndicat National de l'Édition Phonographique (SNEP) chart and was also certified Silver by the SNEP.

== Release ==
"Lemon Incest" is a "sultry" and "suggestive" pop duet and ballad recorded and composed by Serge Gainsbourg and his then-12- or 13-year-old (Note: Some sources list Charlotte's age at the time as 12 years old; others list it as 13. Charlotte herself has variously stated that she was 12 years old and 13 years old.) daughter, Charlotte Gainsbourg, who made her musical debut with the song. It was recorded in 1984 and included on Serge's controversial new wave album Love on the Beat, which was released the same year, as well as on Charlotte's 1986 debut album Charlotte for Ever.

== Composition ==
The title of "Lemon Incest" is a play on the phrase un zeste de citron, the French term for lemon zest. Its lyrics, written by Serge, describe an incestuous relationship between Serge and Charlotte, the latter of whom sings in French, "The love we will never make together is the most beautiful, the most violent, the purest." The song's melody is taken from Étude Op. 10, No. 3 in E major by Frédéric Chopin. Critics have described her vocals as "wobbly", "shrill", "breathy", and a "cracking whisper". The song has a disco beat and is backed by synths, keyboards, and a chorus singing the song's title.

== Music video and controversy ==
A frame from the music video for "Lemon Incest"

The music video for the song shows Serge, shirtless and in jeans, with Charlotte, wearing a blue dress shirt and panties. They lie side-by-side in a large white double bed. Serge caresses Charlotte and the two are surrounded by cracked rocks and covered by smoke. The music video was widely panned in France based on accusations that they glamorised paedophilia and incest, which Serge denied. Charlotte also later denied claims that the song was actually about incest, saying that, although the song uses the word "incest", "[Serge is] just talking about the infinite love of a father for his daughter and of a daughter for her father." According to The Guardian's Francine Gorman, "Lemon Incest" "caused one of the biggest scandals of [Serge] Gainsbourg's career" and was "his most highly contested release". Sylvie Simmons wrote in her 2001 biography Serge Gainsbourg: A Fistful of Gitanes that the song's music video "hit [a] 10 on the scandalometer". Simon Vozick-Levinson of The New York Times wrote that it "nearly outdid the scandal caused by her parents' explicit duet, 'Je t'aime... moi non plus,' in the late '60s". The Telegraph listed it as one of the most controversial music videos of all time.

Charlotte remained unaware of the controversy surrounding the song during its popularity, as she was attending boarding school in Switzerland when it was released. As an adult, Charlotte described both her and Serge's relationship and the song itself as "very innocent" and "very pure", adding that she understood the lyrics when she sang them. She also stated that it was "very generous" of her mother, actress Jane Birkin—who called the song "a bit dodgy"—to "let [her] be free like that". Birkin later stated that the song "never came as a shock or a surprise or even a worry [to her], knowing Serge's great love for Charlotte". Charlotte was, however, critical of the video, stating, "But that video—ack."

== Critical reception ==
For The Guardian, James Wignall wrote retrospectively that he "actually quite like[d]" the song and that its lyrics were "quite benign" despite accusations that they were pro-paedophilia. Flavorwire's Alison Nastasi stated that the song was "pretty damn catchy" but "totally bizarre", calling "Charlotte’s trembling, adolescent delivery" "intriguing". AllMusic's Thom Jurek compared Charlotte's vocal performance on "Lemon Incest" to her mother's on "Je t'aime... moi non plus" and described the song as "one of a kind" and "sick, cheap, and somehow strangely compelling." He also wrote, however, that the song was "nothing special" musically.

For Spin's list of the "worst songs by otherwise great artists", Liza Lentini praised Charlotte's "beautiful" voice on the song, but wrote that its subject matter "never, ever sat quite right for [her]", also writing, "I don't think the song itself...has much merit." Derrick Clifton of Mic called "Lemon Incest" "perhaps one of the most disturbing songs and music videos ever recorded", and saw it as an example of "rape culture" in music videos due to its implications of statutory rape. Josh Gray of Clash and Vice's Kim Kelly called it "creepy". Melissa Anderson of The Village Voice wrote that it "provoke[s] a certain unease" and Benjamin Ivry of The Forward described it as "salacious", "bizarre", and "icky". It was listed as one of the creepiest father-daughter duets of all time by VH1 in 2015. Ludovic Hunter-Tilney of the Financial Times compared "Lemon Incest" to "Je t'aime... moi non plus", Serge's 1969 duet with Birkin, his then-wife, writing that Charlotte "disturbingly reprised the erotic role her mother played in the Serge-penned 1969 hit."

== Legacy and aftermath ==
"Lemon Incest" was called Charlotte's only hit record by Shawn Levy of The Oregonian. A snippet of "Lemon Incest" was included on Serge's 1985 live album, Gainsbourg Live, in which the song begins before he stops to tell the audience, in French, "Charlotte has to go to school tomorrow, she has homework to do." Two years after the release of "Lemon Incest", Serge directed the film Charlotte for Ever, which he starred in alongside Charlotte. In it, Serge plays a screenwriter who becomes sexually attracted to his daughter, played by Charlotte.

The controversy surrounding "Lemon Incest" further increased when Serge kissed Charlotte on the lips after she won the César Award for Most Promising Actress in 1986 for her role in An Impudent Girl. Serge produced Charlotte's debut album of the same name, which was released the same year and featured two other duets between the two: "Plus Doux Avec Moi" and the title track. On the latter, she sings, in French, "Daddy, daddy, I'm afraid to taste your flavor." She did not return to music until over a decade later, and her second album, 5:55, was released in 2006. As of 2019, she regularly closes her tours with a performance of "Lemon Incest". The track was also used in the 2009 film Genova. It was covered by French singer Alex Beaupain for his remake of Love on the Beat in 2021.

== Chart performance ==
On the SNEP's Top 50 chart, "Lemon Incest" debuted at number four for the week of 27 October 1985, then peaked at number two the following week. The song spent a total of 14 weeks on the chart, 10 of which were spent in the top-10 of the chart. The song did not make an impact in the United States.

== Charts ==
Chart (1985–1986)	Peak position
France (SNEP)	2

== Certifications ==
Region	Certification	Certified units/sales
France (SNEP)	Silver	250,000^{*}
^{*} Sales figures based on certification alone.
