= Stage Whisper =

Compilation album by Charlotte Gainsbourg
- Released: December 13, 2011
- Recorded: 2010–2011
- Genres: Alternative rock, indie pop, chamber pop
- Length: 66:03
- Labels: Because, Elektra
- Producer: Beck

Charlotte Gainsbourg chronology
IRM (2009)	Stage Whisper (2011)	Rest (2017)

Singles from Stage Whisper
- 1. "Memoir"; 2. "Terrible Angels"; 3. "Paradisco"; 4. "Anna"

Stage Whisper is the first compilation album by British-French singer & actress Charlotte Gainsbourg, released on December 13, 2011 by Because Music & Elektra Records.

In 2012 it was awarded a double silver certification from the Independent Music Companies Association which indicated sales of at least 40,000 copies throughout Europe.

== Track listing ==
Disc 1
No.	Title	Length
1.	"Terrible Angels"	3:49
2.	"Paradisco"	4:27
3.	"All the Rain"	3:24
4.	"White Telephone"	3:29
5.	"Anna"	2:38
6.	"Got to Let Go" (featuring Charlie Fink of Noah and the Whale)	3:34
7.	"Out of Touch" (featuring Connan Mockasin)	3:48
8.	"Memoir"	2:57

Disc 2: Live album
No.	Title	Length
1.	"IRM"	2:41
2.	"Set Yourself on Fire"	3:53
3.	"Jamais"	4:02
4.	"Heaven Can Wait"	2:22
5.	"In the End"	2:00
6.	"AF607105"	4:53
7.	"Just Like a Woman"	5:16
8.	"The Operation"	3:17
9.	"The Songs That We Sing"	3:29
10.	"Voyage"	3:10
11.	"Trick Pony"	2:55
