= HUMP! =

Annual presentation of amateur pornography

- Founded: 2005
- Founded by: Dan Savage
- Language: English
- Website: www.humpfilmfest.com

HUMP! is an annual film festival founded by Dan Savage in 2005. HUMP! describes itself as "the world's best amateur porn film festival." The festival—which premiered in Seattle, Washington, and Portland, Oregon—showcases home-movie erotica, amateur sex cinema, and locally produced pornography, all of which must be five minutes or less. Films are rated by the audience, and awards are given.

HUMP! expanded to 14 additional cities in 2014, starting with sold-out shows at the Music Box Theater in Chicago. As of 2023, HUMP!'s annual tour includes more than fifty cities across the United States, Canada, and Europe. Each year the festival kicks off in Seattle and Portland before beginning its global tour.

In its early years, Dan Savage would destroy the single DVD containing the films, ensuring performers' privacy was preserved forever. In 2023, however, HUMP! launched a streaming library of past entries to allow for "timeless appreciation of [the] festival's creative brilliance."

HUMP! encourages filmmakers to produce entries specifically for HUMP! itself. Several films that premiered at HUMP! have been re-released and achieved significant commercial success, including the gay feature "Lawnboy" and Gloria Brame's short mockumentary, "How To Get A Leg Up In Porn."

== In popular culture ==
At the 25th Sundance Film Festival, the independent film Humpday featured characters creating a submission for the HUMP! film festival. The story of two straight men making a gay erotic film for the HUMP! opened to strongly positive reviews.

In 2012, Yvan Attal made a remake of Humpday under the title Do Not Disturb.

== See also ==
- Culture of Portland, Oregon
