= Twincest (disambiguation) =

Twincest is incest between twins.

Twincest may also refer to:

- Twincest, a 2004 performance art collaboration by Jiz Lee
- Twincest (Le Sexoflex), a 2010 film at the HUMP! festival
