= Tuil (disambiguation) =

Tuil is a village in the Netherlands.

TUIL may refer to:

- Texas University Interscholastic League, Texas scholastic extracurricular governing body
- Tromsdalen UIL Norwegian sports club

== See also ==
- TUIL Arena, a stadium in Norway
- Karine Tuil (born 1972), French novelist
