= The Accusation (2021 film) =

2021 courtroom drama film

- Theatrical release poster
- French: Les Choses humaines
- Literally: Human Things
- Directed by: Yvan Attal
- Screenplay by: Yaël Langmann; Yvan Attal
- Based on: Les Choses humaines by Karine Tuil
- Produced by: Olivier Delbosc; Yvan Attal
- Starring: Ben Attal; Suzanne Jouannet; Charlotte Gainsbourg; Mathieu Kassovitz; Pierre Arditi; Audrey Dana; Benjamin Lavernhe; Judith Chemla
- Cinematography: Rémy Chevrin
- Edited by: Albertine Lastera
- Music by: Mathieu Lamboley
- Production companies: Films Sous Influence; Curiosa Films; Gaumont; France 2 Cinéma
- Distributed by: Gaumont
- Release dates: 9 September 2021 (Venice); 1 December 2021 (France)
- Running time: 138 minutes
- Country: France
- Language: French
- Budget: €7.9 million
- Box office: $1.4 million

The Accusation (French: Les Choses humaines, lit. 'Human Things') is a 2021 French courtroom drama film directed by Yvan Attal. The screenplay, written by Attal and Yaël Langmann, is an adaptation of the 2019 novel Les Choses humaines by Karine Tuil. It had its world premiere on 9 September 2021 at the 78th Venice International Film Festival, and was released in France by Gaumont on 1 December 2021.

== Plot ==
Alexandre Farel is the son of a prominent television presenter, Jean Farel. Claire, his mother, left Jean and lives with Adam Wizman, who is also separated from his Orthodox Jewish wife, with whom he has a daughter, Mila. When Alexandre returns from finishing his studies in the United States, he accompanies his mother for an evening and meets Mila. Together, they go to a party for the former students of Lycée Henri-IV. The next day, the police arrest Alexandre, who has been accused of rape by Mila. He denies the charge and argues that the act was consensual. The event sends the families into a breakdown as their lives are torn apart by the trial.

== Cast ==
- Ben Attal as Alexandre Farel
- Suzanne Jouannet as Mila Wizman
- Charlotte Gainsbourg as Claire Farel
- Mathieu Kassovitz as Adam Wizman
- Pierre Arditi as Jean Farel
- Audrey Dana as Valérie Berdah
- Benjamin Lavernhe as Maître Arthur Célerier
- Judith Chemla as Mila's lawyer
- Hervé Temime as Maître Lancel
- Franz-Rudolf Lang as Maître Rozenberg
- Réjane Kerdaffrec as Anne Collet
- Gérard Watkins as Avocat Général
- Laetitia Colombani as Psychologist
- Jean-Charles Piette as Expert Psychiatrist
- Marie Dompnier as Madame Vallet
- Jean-Toussaint Bernard
- Romain Cottard
- Zakariya Gouram
- Laëtitia Eïdo as Yasmina Vasseur
- Camille Razat as Quitterie
- Emmanuelle Lepoutre
- Anne Bouvier as Madame Ballard
- Marie-Bénédicte Roy as Marianne
- Joaquim Fossi
- Angèle Metzger
- Fahmi Guerbaa
- Julie Fournier as Florence Laplace
- Fabrice Drouelle

== Production ==
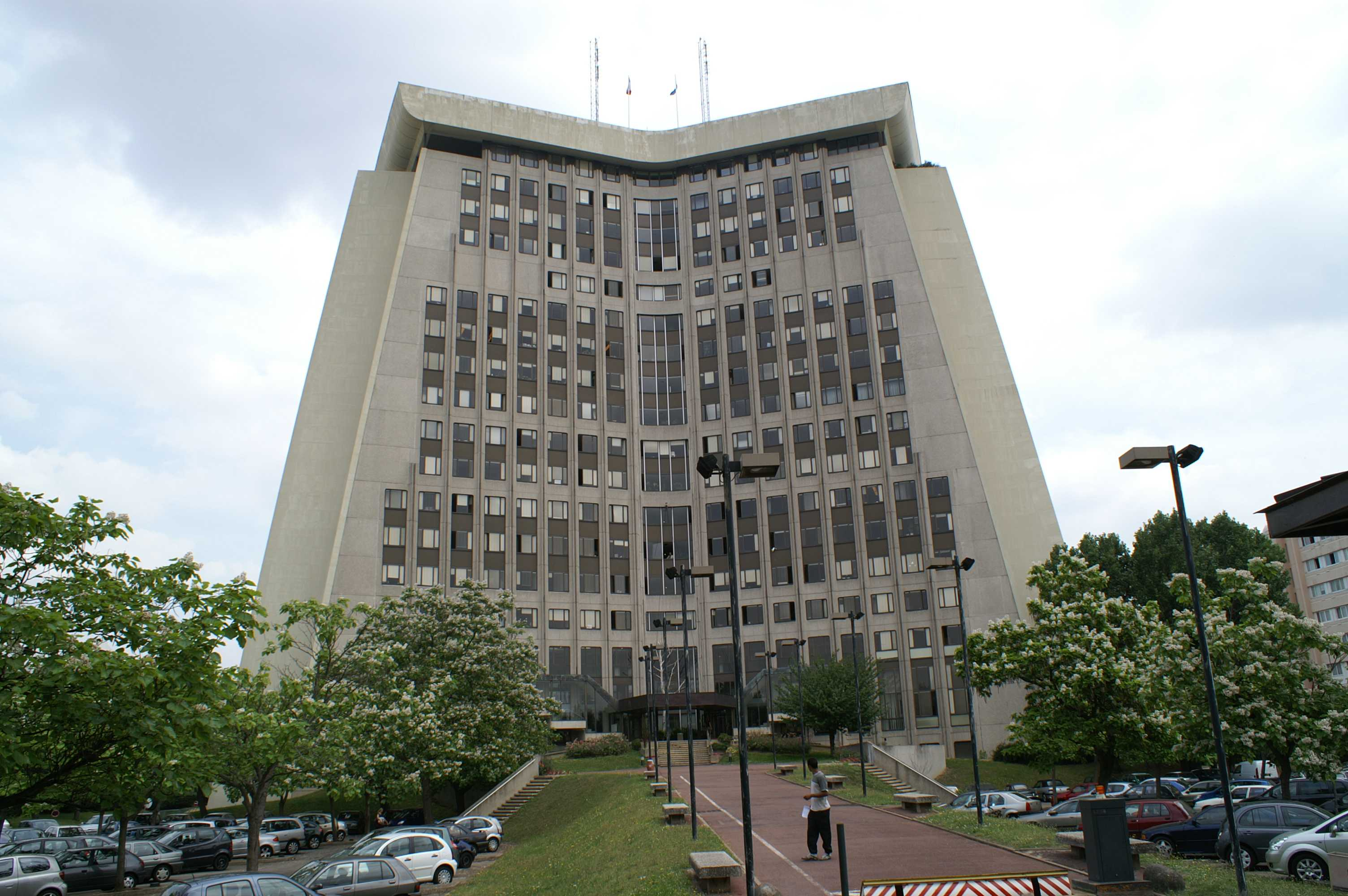
The palais de justice of Créteil serves as the setting of the film.

The screenplay is inspired by the novel Les Choses humaines by Karine Tuil, published in the summer of 2019, which notably won the Prix Interallié and the Prix Goncourt des Lycéens. Karine Tuil herself was inspired by a news story that occurred on the Stanford University campus (the 2015 rape case of Stanford student Brock Turner) to write the novel.

Yvan Attal directs his partner Charlotte Gainsbourg in the film as well as their son, Ben Attal — both of whom already starred in his previous film, My Dog Stupid, released in 2019.

Principal photography began in August 2020. Filming especially took place in the courthouse of Créteil (Val-de-Marne). Filming took place in Paris until 7 November 2020.

== Release ==
The Accusation had its world premiere on 9 September 2021 at the 78th Venice International Film Festival. The film was also screened at 47th Deauville American Film Festival on 11 September 2021. It was theatrically released in France by Gaumont on 1 December 2021.

== Reception ==
=== Box office ===
The film sold 182,074 admissions in France, grossing a domestic total of $1.3 million.

=== Critical response ===
The Accusation received an average rating of 3.1 out of 5 stars on the French website AlloCiné, based on 28 reviews. On Rotten Tomatoes, the film holds an approval rating of 88% based on 8 reviews, with an average rating of 7.8/10.

Jordan Mintzer of The Hollywood Reporter wrote, "The film tends to overstay its welcome, mostly because Attal doesn't know when to cut a scene short, or otherwise cut away, and let us think for ourselves".

=== Accolades ===
Award	Date of ceremony	Category	Recipient(s)	Result	Ref.
César Awards	25 February 2022	Best Adaptation	Yaël Langmann, Yvan Attal	Nominated	
Miskolc International Film Festival	17 September 2022	Emeric Pressburger Prize for Best Feature Film	The Accusation	Nominated	
