= Humpday =

2009 film by Lynn Shelton

- Theatrical release poster
- Directed by: Lynn Shelton
- Written by: Lynn Shelton
- Produced by: Lynn Shelton
- Starring: Mark Duplass; Joshua Leonard; Alycia Delmore
- Cinematography: Benjamin Kasulke
- Edited by: Nat Sanders
- Music by: Vince Smith
- Production companies: Magnolia Pictures; Seashel Pictures
- Distributed by: Magnolia Pictures
- Release dates: January 16, 2009 (Sundance); July 10, 2009 (United States; limited)
- Running time: 94 minutes
- Country: United States
- Language: English

Humpday is a 2009 American mumblecore comedy-drama film directed, produced, and written by Lynn Shelton and starring Mark Duplass, Joshua Leonard, and Alycia Delmore. It premiered at the 2009 Sundance Film Festival. International distribution rights were purchased by Magnolia Pictures for a mid-six figure sum. The film opened in New York City in a limited release on July 10, 2009. The story line follows two male heterosexual best friends, Ben and Andrew. The plot line centers around a "mutual dare" that is introduced at a party, which involves the two main characters engaging in a pornographic film together. The film was shot on-location in Washington state around Seattle from September 2008 to January 2009, and much of the dialogue for the film was improvised.

Humpday received positive critical reception and won the Special Jury Prize for Spirit of Independence at the 2009 Sundance Film Festival, among other awards.

In 2012, a remake in French entitled Do Not Disturb was released.

== Plot ==
In Seattle during the late 2000s, two heterosexual male friends Ben and Andrew meet after having not seen each other for 10 years. During a party, they find themselves locked in a "mutual dare" situation engaging to make a gay pornographic film, including anal sex, as an "art project" between two straight guys and submit it to the HUMP! film festival, an annual amateur pornography contest put on by the underground newspaper The Stranger. They do not decide yet who will penetrate whom. Ben tells Andrew that he will discuss the project with his wife Anna, an otherwise introverted record store clerk at Easy Street Records. As Ben begins to describe the project to Anna, she reacts skeptically at the mere mention of amateur pornography. Ben finds himself lying to Anna; he talks about the project with only vague detail, telling her that he will likely act as a behind-the-scenes assistant to the hypothetical film crew.

Later, after a raunchy debate with her coworkers about the contest, Anna finds herself alone with Andrew and suggests that they have a drink together in an effort to get to know one another. Now drunk, the two begin discussing Ben and Andrew's art project, Andrew assuming that Ben has completely informed Anna of their intentions. After Andrew bluntly reveals that Ben will potentially have a gay experience, Anna becomes upset and confused, confronting Ben personally. The next morning, Ben insists that he still wants to go through with the project, and Anna consents.

Ben and Andrew meet in a hotel, bringing a video camera. Their attempts to have sex are prolonged by lengthy discussions and frequent analyzing of how to approach the experience. Although they film themselves kissing each other on the mouth, and hugging each other in their underpants, neither Ben nor Andrew appears comfortable becoming completely naked, let alone having sex. The two continue to talk, not sure if either one will be able to achieve an erection, and begin to question the validity of their experiment as a work of art. Ben finally suggests that they call off the project, and the two laugh at the ridiculousness of the situation. Ben leaves the hotel, intending to apologize to Anna. Andrew prepares to leave shortly afterward, but not before reviewing the footage that the two have recorded.

== Cast ==
- Mark Duplass as Ben
- Joshua Leonard as Andrew
- Alycia Delmore as Anna
- Lynn Shelton as Monica
- Trina Willard as Lily
- Tyler Swenson as Teddy
- John Roderick as Mitch
- Kelly Swanson as Jennifer
- Leon Allen as Lenny
- Michelle Chapman as Shelley
- Kyle Stump as Peter
- Thomas Patton III as Josh
- Brittany Brown as Gwen
- Ken Schram as Ben's father
- Dan Savage as himself (cameo)
- Jim Page as himself (cameo)
- Mark Arm as himself (cameo)

In addition to Duplass and Leonard, the film features appearances from multiple indie musicians based out of Seattle's Capitol Hill neighborhood in the late 2000s as well as noted Seattle icons Ken Schram, Dan Savage and the Spoonman.

== Reception ==
Humpday received positive reviews from critics. It has an approval rating of 79% on Rotten Tomatoes, based on 137 reviews, and an average rating of 6.70 out of 10. The website's critical consensus states, "Observant and insightful, this indie comedy takes a different tack on the "bromance" but still makes a point without sermonizing." On Metacritic, the film has a weighted average score of 74 out of 100, based on 25 critics, indicating "generally favorable" reviews.

It has been categorized by some reviewers as part of the mumblecore movement in indie cinema. Reviewing the film for NPR, Bob Mondello wrote that though the setup may sound "preposterous", "if you bear with writer-director Lynn Shelton a bit, she takes her concept places that are a lot more resonant than you'd expect. And she does it without shortchanging the laughs that flow from the fact that these guys are going to have male-intimacy troubles that go way beyond backslapping…The film ends up being about not just a really idiotic dare, but about the bounds of friendship and the bonds of marriage — and about how unsettling it can be to look at yourself in the cold light of maturity, and realize you're not who you thought you'd grow up to be."

It was an award winner at the 2009 Sundance Film Festival, receiving a "Special Jury Prize for Spirit of Independence". In 2009, The New York Times' Stephen Holden selected the movie as a "NYT Critics' Pick" and New York magazine also selected it as a "Critics' Pick".

=== Accolades ===
The film won both "Best Director" for Shelton and "Best Actor" for both Duplass and Leonard at the 2009 Gijón International Film Festival. At the 2010 Independent Spirit Awards, the film won the John Cassavetes Award.

== Remake ==
In 2012, a French-language remake was released under the title Do Not Disturb, directed by Yvan Attal and starring Attal and François Cluzet.
