= Charlotte for Ever (film) =

1986 film by Serge Gainsbourg

- Directed by: Serge Gainsbourg
- Written by: Serge Gainsbourg
- Produced by: Claudie Ossard
- Starring: Charlotte Gainsbourg; Serge Gainsbourg; Roland Bertin; Roland Dubillard
- Cinematography: Willy Kurant
- Edited by: Babeth Si Ramdane
- Music by: Serge Gainsbourg
- Distributed by: AMLF
- Release date: 10 December 1986
- Running time: 94 minutes
- Country: France
- Language: French

Charlotte for Ever is a 1986 feature film directed by Serge Gainsbourg, starring himself, Charlotte Gainsbourg, Roland Bertin and Roland Dubillard .

== Plot ==
Once a successful Hollywood screenwriter, Stan is now a depressive alcoholic who spends most of his time mooching about his house whilst pouring out his troubles to his drinking partner. The only thing that keeps him going is his love for his teenage daughter, Charlotte, but she despises him, believing him to be responsible for the accident in which her mother died. Stan's one hope is to patch things up with Charlotte.

== Cast ==
- Charlotte Gainsbourg as Charlotte
- Serge Gainsbourg as Stan
- Roland Bertin as Leon
- Roland Dubillard as Herman
- Anne Zamberlan as Lola
- Anne Le Guernec as Adelaide

== Production ==
Charlotte Gainsbourg has only bad memories of the shooting of this film. She has stated her father made her push her limits despite her young age. "He made me go too far, do things that bothered me. It was difficult. I sulked on the covers of the newspapers, I didn't want to make any effort, that was my way of preserving myself," she recalls.

== Controversy ==
In 1984, two years before Charlotte for Ever was released, Gainsbourg had written and performed the song "Lemon Incest" with his daughter, Charlotte Gainsbourg. The song was hugely controversial as it contained references to incest and pedophilia, which audiences suspected were partially autobiographical. The movie Charlotte for Ever explored similar themes. Due to Charlotte Gainsbourg's age and the fact that she was playing a character with the same name as her own while her real-life father was playing her father in the movie, the movie was reviled and questions about whether Gainsbourg was abusing his daughter were once again raised. As an adult, Charlotte Gainsbourg repeatedly defended her relationship with her father, admitting that he had meant to provoke audiences but denying any impropriety or abuse towards herself.
