= Delicate Gravity =

2013 film by Philippe Andre

- Directed by: Philippe Andre
- Written by: Philippe Andre, Daniel Hainey
- Produced by: Patrick Barbier
- Starring: Yvan Attal, Anne Parillaud
- Music by: Johann Johannsson, The XX, Chromatics
- Release date: May 15, 2013 (Cannes Film Festival)
- Running time: 30 minutes
- Country: France
- Language: French

Delicate Gravity (Délicate Gravité) is a short film directed by Philippe Andre and written by Philippe Andre and Daniel Hainey. It won Best of Festival Award at the Palm Springs International Short Film Festival 2013, Best of the Festival and Fest Foreign Film at the Nevada City Film Festival, Audience Choice Award at Bermuda International Film Festival. It has been part of the Unifrance edition of French Cinema in Russia.

== Plot ==
Paul receives an emotional message from Claire. He can hear the deep sadness behind her words and believes she might commit suicide. But Paul does not know Claire. This is a message left on the wrong man’s phone, a message that will lead Paul to a brief encounter with Claire.

== Cast ==
- Yvan Attal as Paul
- Anne Parillaud as Claire
- Jade Phan-Gia as The Waitress
- Gregoire Bonnet as Man in the lobby
- Tadrina Hocking as Voice on the phone

== Music ==
- Jóhann Jóhannsson : Fordlandia
- Jóhann Jóhannsson : Joi & Karen
- Chromatics : Broken Mirrors
- The XX : Fantasy

== Awards ==
- Best of Festival Award at Palm Springs International Short Film Festival 2013
- Best of the Festival and Fest Foreign Film at the Nevada City Film Festival 2013
- Audience Choice Award at Bermuda International Film Festival 2014

== Selections ==
- Cannes Short Film Corner 2013
- Flickers Rhodes Island International Film festival 2013
- The Portobello Film Festival 2013
- The Bermuda International Film Festival 2014
- Newport Beach Film Festival 2014
- 37th Portland International Film festival 2014
- New York City Film Festival 2014
