= The Age of Reinvention =

First edition

The Age of Reinvention is a stand-alone novel written by Karine Tuil. It was originally published as L'Invention de Nos Vies by Editions Grasset & Fasquelle on August 21, 2013, and was later translated to English by Sam Taylor on December 1, 2015. It is an international best seller and a finalist for the Prix Goncourt. The book consists of four parts and has a total of 76 chapters. The audio book is read by George Newbern.

== Plot ==
On his eighteenth birthday, Samuel Baron finds out he is not who he thought he was. He is shocked to find that the people who raised him are not his real parents and that his real name is a variation of Christ's, a big surprise with his Jewish upbringing. This is a source of great emotional turmoil for Samuel. In his anger, he leaves his parents to attend college in France, where he meets his girlfriend Nina, a beautiful girl born to a broken military family. While at college, he and Nina meet the ambitious, seductive Sam Tahar—not to be confused with Samuel Baron.

Suddenly, Samuel's parents are killed in a car accident. Before leaving to repatriate his them, Samuel tells Sam to look after Nina. After an exam, Nina comes to Sam in tears. Betraying Samuel's trust, Sam and Nina sleep together. Samuel returns and never learns of the incident, but things aren't the same between them. At the end of the school year, Samuel senses their relationship and gives Nina an ultimatum: him or Sam. Samuel, feeling that it is over between him and Nina, tries to commit suicide as a desperate last attempt to keep her. Nina, moved by this final act, stays with him.

Years later, Sam has become one of America's top lawyers and is married to one of the most prestigious families in New York. Samuel and Nina, however, are living among the lower-class. They see Sam on TV, and Samuel pushes Nina to contact him. He is afraid that if Nina could do it over again, she would choose Sam. Nina and Sam rekindle their lost passion, and she leaves Samuel. Sam hides his affair with Nina. But as it turns out, the affair isn't the only thing Sam is hiding. When Sam's half-brother Francois appears in his office one day, his mysterious past begins to unravel. His real name is Samir Tahar. He is of Arabic descent, not Jewish descent as everyone believes. In an attempt to make his half-brother disappear, he creates a foreign bank account to support him. Unbeknownst to Samir, his brother gets involved in terrorist activities using the money Samir supplies. Late one night, Samir is arrested in his home. The United States of America is pressing charges against Samir for funding terrorist activity. His family feels betrayed, and the media spreads the truth about Samir's roots across America. Nina, unaware of his imprisonment, believes that he has lost interest in her, and she returns home to France.

Once Nina leaves Samuel, he is destroyed. He begins to do drugs, and his life seems to take a turn for the worse. But in his pain, he finds inspiration to write. With his first published novel titled Consolation, Samuel skyrockets into success. But despite his success, he finds that he still isn't content. He is drained by the constant interviews and media coverage that come with the popularity of his book. Upon hearing of Samir's imprisonment, he decides to be a witness for Samir so that he can write a new book about it. But once he sees the state that Samir is in, he is unable to bring himself to it. Despite all the hurt Samir has caused him, he testifies for Samir's case and writes an article in France that helps put the people on Samir's side. After sixty-six days of brutal interrogation, Samir is released.

Once Nina arrives back in France, she is shocked to find a new family in Samuel's old apartment, unaware of his newfound success. She is left to live among the homeless on the streets. When Samuel discovers this, he hires an investigator to track her down. When he finds her at a homeless women's shelter, he tries to convince her to come back. She has gained weight and stopped caring for her appearance, but she finds comfort in letting go of what she used to hold on to so dearly. She refuses to go with him. She wants to live a life of her own.

The novel concludes with each character left with the effects of the life they constructed for themselves. Though they achieved what they had dreamed, they were unable to find happiness in their goals. Samir must start his life anew. His wife has filed for divorce, and many of his clients have moved companies. Samuel no longer has the girl he loved, and Nina has left the life she's always known for where she feels like she truly belongs.

== Themes ==
=== Emptiness of Attaining False Dream ===
The theme "Emptiness of Obtaining False Dream" is most prevalent in The Age of Reinvention's conclusion. Throughout the novel, each character is pursuing goals they believe will make them happy. Samir is pursuing a successful career. Samuel is attempting to get his work published. Nina is chasing love. At the conclusion of the novel, each finds that what they were pursuing the whole time isn't what makes them truly happy. Samir's career is destroyed when the truth of his identity is revealed. Samuel becomes a successful author, but finds that his success prevents him from writing. Nina obtains the love she wanted, but it doesn't bring her satisfaction. She ends up living in a homeless women's shelter without a companion by the end of the book, but she finds contentment there. Samir, Samuel, and Nina each discover that what they had planned for their lives is not what made them the happiest, and therefore "Emptiness of Obtaining False Dream" is one of the novels overarching themes.

=== Individual vs. Society ===
Throughout the novel, each individual character is battling against the society he or she lives in. Samir Tahar is at odds with society. In his childhood, he fights against his family's poverty by buying nice clothes secondhand from the rich kids at his school. When he becomes a lawyer in America, he finds that a prejudice exists that prevents him from getting a job. Again he must fight against society. He creates a new identity to battle this racism. Eventually, he is sued by the United States of America, and he must fight society yet again. Samuel Baron faces society as well. For a majority of the book, Samuel attempts to become an author and get his works published. His work continues to get rejected, and he lives in poverty. Eventually his work Consolation takes off, and he becomes a famous author, but his battle with society only changes. Now, he is constantly bombarded with interviews and press conferences. Because of this, he can no longer spend time doing what he loves: writing. Both Samir and Samuel must fight against society throughout the course of the novel, and thus "individual vs. society" is a prominent theme in the book.

=== Own Worst Enemy ===
Several characters in The Age of Reinvention constantly do things that are against his or her own self interest. Samir, for example, has an insatiable lust. Even though he has married one of the most affluent women of the time, he still seeks out sexual relationships with other women. This causes several conflicts within the story. One of the main characters, Nina, becomes his mistress while he is married. When some of Samir's coworkers discover this, they get into an argument with Samir. One of whom intervenes when Samir is arrested, lies to Nina, and tells her she should head back to France. Many of Samir's problems are caused by his own actions, mainly as a result of his lust: for power and for women. Samuel Baron is another character who is his own worst enemy. When Nina initially tries to leave him, he attempts to commit suicide. This initially keeps Nina with him, but it will only harm him later on. The reason that eventually causes Nina to leave him is Samuel himself. He is the one who encourages Nina to contact Samir, which results in the main conflict of the story. Samuel is the source of much of his own stress and pain.

=== Prejudice and Racism ===
The Age of Reinvention's central conflict revolves around prejudice and racism. Samir Tahar is of a Muslim background, and he finds that he cannot find a job, despite being from an excellent law school. Once he changes to a Jewish-sounding name, he begins to get interviews for jobs. The rest of the novel unfolds as Samir struggles with his roots. When his roots are discovered and he is arrested for being suspect of terrorism, it causes great upheaval in his life. His wife divorces him and many clients move law firms. This topic was a source of much criticism for the novel (see Reception).

== Reception ==
The Age of Reinvention has been met with mixed reception since the English translation released in 2015. Among positive things, the book was a finalist for the Prix Goncourt in 2013, one of the most prestigious French literary awards. Several articles liken the book to a modern-day Great Gatsby. In a review from The Washington Post, Ron Charles simply notes the Gatsby-like qualities of Samir Tahar. Heidi Warneke, however, describes the whole novel as "Gatsby-esque" with the added themes of "prejudice, politics, and racism." Most reviews compliment the initial premise of the novel and what Tuil aimed for with her novel. Charles also notes Tuil's use of style to convey tension and hysteria in the novel.

The novel was also met with much criticism. Although Charles compliments Tuil's style, some articles criticize it. Carmela Ciuraru of The New York Times describes it as a "synonym buffet" and critiques Tuil's use of footnotes. Much critique, however, goes to Karine Tuil's handling of racism within the novel. Hannah Beckerman, in a review for The Observer, criticizes the dichotomy between Jews and Muslims in The Age of Reinvention. She notes that all of the Muslims in the book get a sad ending, while all the Jewish characters end up well-off. In the journal Humaniora, Ellita Widjayanti writes about Islamophobia in The Age of Reinvention. She discusses how Tuil portrays each of the Muslim characters negatively. However other articles, discuss The Age of Reinvention as a timely novel that addresses these subjects, not as Islamophobic itself. Some articles note that though they believe the initial premise was promising, it failed to follow through. This view for Beckerman is a result of how racism is portrayed in the novel, but for Ciuraru it was due to its themes.

== Style ==
Several articles comment on Karine Tuil's style in The Age of Reinvention. Tuil uses footnotes in the story to provide more background on characters. Each time a character has a brief interaction with a passerby, a footnote is provided explaining some additional detail or motive. For example, Samir passes a bouncer at a club. "Bouncer" has a footnote that explains this man dreamed of being a champion boxer, but instead had to settle for a job as a nightclub bouncer. This provides additional detail on different people—even places—throughout the novel. The reviewers also comment on how Tuil describes things. This is what Ciuraru describes as a "synonym buffet." Tuil writes a series of synonyms separated by forward slashes. For example, Tuil writes, "[Samir] enters the courtroom, frightened/distraught/exhausted."
