= Rest (Charlotte Gainsbourg album) =

Studio album by Charlotte Gainsbourg
- Released: 17 November 2017
- Studios: A.S. (Paris); Palestine (Paris); Motorbass (Paris); Electric Lady (New York); Crowdspacer (Brooklyn, New York)
- Length: 48:23
- Languages: English; French
- Labels: Because, Atlantic
- Producer: SebastiAn (Note: Except "Rest", produced by Guy-Manuel de Homem-Christo. Additional vocal production and editing by Brian Burton on "Lying with You", "I'm a Lie", "Dans vos airs" and "Les Crocodiles".)

Charlotte Gainsbourg chronology
Stage Whisper (2011)	Rest (2017)	Take 2 (2018)

Singles from Rest
- 1. "Rest" Released: 8 September 2017; 2. "Deadly Valentine" Released: 21 September 2017

Rest is the fourth studio album by French and British singer and actress Charlotte Gainsbourg. It was primarily produced by French electronic musician SebastiAn, and released on 17 November 2017 by Because Music and Atlantic Records. It is her first studio album in eight years, and features collaborations with Paul McCartney, Guy-Manuel de Homem-Christo, Owen Pallett and Connan Hosford, among others. The tracks "Rest" and "Deadly Valentine" were released as singles and music videos, both directed by Gainsbourg herself.

The album explores the deaths of Gainsbourg's father Serge Gainsbourg and half-sister Kate Barry, with a focus on the theme of alcohol addiction. She has commented that "the album took a different direction. I wanted to express [my grief] not only with sadness but with anger." The lyrics are in English and French.

== Background ==
When they first met, SebastiAn told Gainsbourg that he would like to work with her but that he wanted the project to be done in French, but she refused to do so. A year later, Gainsbourg, after the death of her sister Kate Barry, contacted him again and told him that she would like to say certain things and that she could only say them in French. Thus, they started working on Rest in New York.

== Critical reception ==
Professional ratings
Aggregate scores
Source	Rating
AnyDecentMusic?	7.5/10
Metacritic	80/100
Review scores
Source	Rating
AllMusic	4/5 stars
The A.V. Club	B+
The Guardian	4/5 stars
Mojo	4/5 stars
The Observer	3/5 stars
Pitchfork	8.7/10
Q	4/5 stars
Rolling Stone	3.5/5 stars
The Times	3/5 stars
Uncut	8/10

Rest received acclaim from music critics. At Metacritic, which assigns a normalized rating out of 100 to reviews from mainstream critics, the album has an average score of 80 out of 100, which indicates "generally favorable reviews" based on 22 reviews. Olivia Horn of Pitchfork awarded the album a "Best New Music" designation, claiming "it is at once scorchingly intimate and fantastically oversized". Exclaim!'s Anna Alger praised Gainsbourg for striking "a balance between sombre beauty and a mix of Euro disco, funk and pop."

=== Accolades ===
Publication	Accolade	Rank	Ref.
Albumism	50 Best Albums of 2017	11	
BrooklynVegan	Top 50 Albums of 2017	29	
Drowned in Sound	Favourite Albums of 2017	64	
Flood Magazine	The Best Albums of 2017	5	
Earbuddy	100 Best Albums of 2017	13	
Noisey	The 100 Best Albums of 2017	99	
Pitchfork	The 50 Best Albums of 2017	17	
Pitchfork	The 20 Best Pop and R&B Albums of 2017	5	
The Independent	30 Best Albums of 2017	24	
The Guardian	The Best Albums of 2017	31	

== Track listing ==
All lyrics written by Charlotte Gainsbourg; all music composed and produced by SebastiAn; except where noted.

No.	Title	Lyrics	Music	Producer(s)	Length
1.	"Ring-a-Ring o' Roses"				4:28
2.	"Lying with You"				3:18
3.	"Kate"				3:40
4.	"Deadly Valentine"				6:04
5.	"I'm a Lie"				3:29
6.	"Rest"	Charlotte Gainsbourg; Guy-Manuel de Homem-Christo	Guy-Manuel de Homem-Christo	Guy-Manuel de Homem-Christo	3:38
7.	"Sylvia Says"	Gainsbourg; Sylvia Plath			4:27
8.	"Songbird in a Cage"	Paul McCartney	Paul McCartney		4:32
9.	"Dans vos airs"		SebastiAn; Connan Hosford		3:33
10.	"Les Crocodiles"		SebastiAn; Hosford		3:17
11.	"Les Oxalis"				7:57
Total length:					48:23

== Personnel ==
Musicians

- Charlotte Gainsbourg – vocals
- SebastiAn – synthesiser (1, 2, 4, 7, 9–11), drum programming (1–5, 7–11), piano (1–3, 9–11), harpsichord (1, 7, 8, 10, 11), bells (1, 7), organ (1), synth bass (2–5, 7, 9, 10), Rhodes (2, 3, 5, 10, 11), bass guitar (7, 10, 11), Wurlitzer (7), backing vocals (7), guitars (9, 11), clavinet (11)
- Emile Sornin – guitars (1, 2, 5), Mellotron (1, 2, 5), bass guitar (1, 2, 5, 8, 9), clavinet (2, 5), harpsichord (2), Philicorda (5, 8), Wurlitzer (5, 8), glockenspiel (5, 8), noise (5, 8), percussion (5), tambourine (8)
- Alice Attal – backing vocals (3)
- Skyler Pierce Scher – backing vocals (3)
- Rachel Kay McCain – backing vocals (3)
- Elisabeth Sophia Seiple – backing vocals (3)
- Vincent Taeger – drums (4, 8, 11)
- Paul McCartney – guitars (8), piano (8), additional drums (8)

Strings and horns

- SebastiAn – arrangement
- Owen Pallett – arrangement, conducting
- Nadia Sirota – fixing, viola
- Kabir Hermon – recording
- Anna Elashvili – violin
- Annaliesa Place – violin
- Laura Lutzke – violin
- Patricia Kilroy – violin
- Pauline Kim Harris – violin
- Rob Moose – violin
- Gabriel Cabezas – cello
- David Nelson – trombone
- Rachel Drehmann – French horn

Technical

- Tom Elmhirst – mixing (1–5, 7–11)
- Joe Visciano – mixing assistance (1–5, 7–11), engineering
- Brandon Boost – mixing assistance (1–5, 7–11), engineering
- Eric Chedeville – mixing (6), engineering (6)
- Sebastian – engineering
- Emile Sornin – engineering
- Julien Naudin – engineering
- Antoine Poyeton – engineering
- Drew Brown – engineering
- Phil Joly – engineering
- Beatriz Artola – engineering
- Joakim Bouaziz – engineering
- Gus – engineering
- Florian Lagatta – engineering (6)
- Laury Chanty – engineering assistance (6)
- Chab – mastering

Artwork

- Collier Schorr – photos
- Nathalie Canguilhem – creative direction
- Raphaël Garnier – graphic design

== Charts ==
=== Weekly charts ===
Chart (2017–18)	Peak position
Austrian Albums (Ö3 Austria)	49
Belgian Albums (Ultratop Flanders)	18
Belgian Albums (Ultratop Wallonia)	9
Canadian Albums (Billboard)	63
French Albums (SNEP)	14
German Albums (Offizielle Top 100)	74
Hungarian Albums (MAHASZ)	38
Scottish Albums (Official Charts)	66
UK Albums (Official Charts)	89

=== Year-end charts ===
Chart (2017)	Position
Belgian Albums (Ultratop Wallonia)	118
French Albums (SNEP)	156

Chart (2018)	Position
Belgian Albums (Ultratop Wallonia)	123
French Albums (SNEP)	188

== Certifications ==
Region	Certification	Certified units/sales
France (SNEP)	Gold	50,000^{‡}
^{‡} Sales+streaming figures based on certification alone.
