= IRM (album) =

Studio album by Charlotte Gainsbourg
- Released: 7 December 2009
- Studio: Anonyme (Los Angeles); Blue Mountain (London); Capitol (Hollywood); The Library (North Hollywood); Ocean Way (Los Angeles); Wack Formula (London)
- Genre: Alternative rock; indie pop
- Length: 41:27
- Label: Because; Elektra
- Producer: Beck Hansen

Charlotte Gainsbourg chronology
5:55 (2006)	IRM (2009)	Stage Whisper (2011)

Singles from IRM
- 1. "Heaven Can Wait" Released: 17 November 2009; 2. "Time of the Assassins" Released: 12 April 2010

IRM is the third studio album by French electropop singer Charlotte Gainsbourg, with all songs written and produced by Beck except "Le Chat Du Café Des Artistes" (written by Jean-Pierre Ferland). The album title was inspired by the French initialism for an MRI scanner. The title track was released as a free download on 9 October 2009. The album was mostly recorded at Beck's home studio in Los Angeles, California. The lead single is "Heaven Can Wait", a duet with Beck, and was released on 2 November. The music video for "Heaven Can Wait" was directed by Keith Schofield and was released on 19 November 2009. The video for "Heaven Can Wait" was named one of the Top 20 best music videos of 2009 by Spin Magazine.

"Trick Pony" is featured in the football video game by EA Sports, FIFA 11 and the Amazon Prime Video drama series My Lady Jane.

According to Gainsbourg, IRM "was Beck's view of what I had gone through, and not mine."

In 2012, it was awarded a Diamond certification from the Independent Music Companies Association, which indicated sales of at least 200,000 copies throughout Europe.

== Reception ==
Professional ratings
Aggregate scores
Source	Rating
AnyDecentMusic?	7.2/10
Metacritic	80/100
Review scores
Source	Rating
AllMusic	4/5 stars
The A.V. Club	B+
The Daily Telegraph	4/5 stars
Entertainment Weekly	B
The Guardian	4/5 stars
The Independent	3/5 stars
Los Angeles Times	3.5/4 stars
Pitchfork	8.4/10
Rolling Stone	3.5/5 stars
Spin	7/10

The album currently has a Metacritic score of 80/100 based on 21 professional reviews, indicating "generally favorable reviews".

== Track listing ==
All tracks are written by Beck Hansen, except where noted.

IRM – Standard edition
No.	Title	Writer(s)	Length
1.	"Master's Hands"		2:49
2.	"IRM"		2:35
3.	"Le Chat du café des artistes"	Jean-Pierre Ferland; Michel Robidoux	4:03
4.	"In the End"		2:00
5.	"Heaven Can Wait"		2:41
6.	"Me and Jane Doe"		3:21
7.	"Vanities"		3:38
8.	"Time of the Assassins"		2:46
9.	"Trick Pony"		2:53
10.	"Greenwich Mean Time"	Charlotte Gainsbourg; Hansen	2:25
11.	"Dandelion"		3:18
12.	"Voyage"		4:05
13.	"La Collectionneuse"	Guillaume Apollinaire^{[a]}; Hansen	5:15
Total length:			41:27

IRM – Version Deluxe
No.	Title	Length
14.	"Looking Glass Blues"	2:42
15.	"Heaven Can Wait" (Chris Taylor Remix)	2:15
Total length:		46:24

Note

- ^{^[a]} "La Collectionneuse" contains extracts from Guillaume Apollinaire's Alcools and Le Guetteur mélancolique poem collections.

== Personnel ==
Musicians

- Charlotte Gainsbourg – vocals (all tracks), flute (track 10), piano (13)
- Beck Hansen – guitar (1, 3, 5–7, 9–11), drum programming (1, 2), vocals (2, 3, 5, 6, 8–10, 13), bass guitar (2, 3, 5, 9, 10, 12), synthesizer (2, 3), percussion (3, 5, 6, 9, 10), piano (3, 5, 10), acoustic guitar (4, 8, 12); marimba, recorder (6); keyboards (12), keyboard bass (13)
- David Campbell – string arrangements, conductor (1, 3, 4, 7, 8, 11–13)
- Drew Brown – drum programming (1, 2), bass guitar (1), string arrangements (2), effects (12, 13); keyboards, strings (13)
- Matt Mahaffey – banjo (1)
- Justin Meldal-Johnsen – percussion (1)
- Joey Waronker – drums (2, 3, 6, 8, 10–12), percussion (2, 3, 6, 10, 12)
- Brian LeBarton – drums (2), celeste (4, 10), bass guitar (5, 10), percussion (5, 6, 12, 13), tambourine (5), marimba (6), synthesizer (8), drum machine (10), piano (11)
- James Gadson – drums (2, 3, 13)
- Matt Sherrod – drums (2, 5)
- Alex Acuña – percussion (2, 12)
- Bram Inscore – bass guitar (4, 7, 8, 11), celeste (4)
- Jason Falkner – acoustic guitar (4), guitar (8)
- David Ralicke – saxophone (5, 11)
- Matt Demeritt – tenor saxophone (5, 11)
- Chris Bautista – trumpet (5, 11)
- Monique McGuffin – harp (7)
- Alice Attal – voice (10)

Technical

- Beck Hansen – production
- Bob Ludwig – mastering
- Drew Brown – mixing, engineering
- Darrell Thorp – mixing, engineering
- Rouble Kappor – engineering assistance
- Wesley Seidman – engineering assistance

Artwork

- Nathalie Canguilhem – art direction
- Audrey Prudhomme – design
- Fouad Allaoui – design
- Raphaël Garnier – design
- Autumn de Wilde – photography
- Jean-Baptiste Mondino – photography
- Nick Knight – photography
- Paul Jasmin – photography

== Charts ==
Chart (2009)	Peak position
Belgian Albums Chart (Wallonia)	8
Belgian Albums Chart (Flanders)	35
Canadian Albums Chart	27
Danish Albums Chart	39
French Albums Chart	4
Greek Albums Chart	13
Swedish Albums Chart	46
Swiss Albums Chart	28
UK Albums Chart	62
US Billboard 200	69
US Billboard Top Rock Albums	16
US Billboard Top Digital Albums	25
US Billboard Top Modern Rock/Alternative Albums	11
US Billboard European Albums Chart	73

== Release history ==
Region	Date	Label	Format	Catalogue
Belgium	4 December 2009		CD	
France	7 December 2009	Because Music	CD	
Switzerland	7 December 2009		CD	
Canada	8 December 2009	Warner Music	CD	
Germany	11 December 2009	Warner Music	CD	
Brazil	22 January 2010	Warner Music	CD	825646842476
United Kingdom	25 January 2010	Because Music	CD	BEC5772602
United Kingdom	25 January 2010	Because Music	CD+DVD	BEC5772603
United Kingdom	25 January 2010	Because Music	LP	BEC5772607
United States	26 January 2010	Elektra	CD	
Argentina	11 February 2010	Warner Music	CD	

== Sunset Sound EP ==
On 13 April 2010, Gainsbourg released a five-track EP called Sunset Sound EP, which contains four songs from IRM recorded live at Sunset Sound Recorders with Beck Hansen.

== Promotional tour ==
To promote IRM, Gainsbourg embarked on her first live tour by performing at several venues, music festivals and television shows in North America, Europe and Asia.

- 9 December 2009 – Taratata on France 2
- 10 December 2009 – Le Grand Journal on Canal+
- 11 December 2009 – Taratata on France 4
- 19 January 2010 – The Bell House, Gowanus, Brooklyn
- 20 January 2010 – The Bell House
- 22 January 2010 – Theater of Living Arts, Philadelphia
- 22 January 2010 – Late Show with David Letterman
- 23 January 2010 – Exclusive concert and interview for Canal+ (France)
- 23 January 2010 – The Hiro Ballroom, New York City
- 28 January 2010 – Morning Becomes Eclectic on KCRW
- 11 April 2010 – Vogue Theatre, Vancouver
- 12 April 2010 – Elemental Night Club, Victoria, British Columbia
- 14 April 2010 - Live performance on KEXP-FM
- 14 April 2010 – Crocodile Cafe, Seattle
- 15 April 2010 – Wonder Ballroom, Portland, Oregon
- 17 April 2010 – Palace of Fine Arts, San Francisco
- 18 April 2010 – Coachella Festival, Indio, California
- 21 April 2010 – Park West, Chicago
- 23 April 2010 – Olympia, Montreal
- 24 April 2010 – Olympia, Montreal
- 25 April 2010 – Webster Hall, New York City
- 14 June 2010 – Le Cargo, Caen
- 15 June 2010 - La Coopé, Clermont-Ferrand
- 16 June 2010 - La Cigale, Paris
- 19 June 2010 - Cirque Royal, Brussels
- 20 June 2010 - Aeronet, Lille
- 22 June 2010 - O2 Shepherd's Bush Empire, London
- 24 June 2010 -Les Nuits de Fourvière, Lyon
- 27 June 2010 - Deutsches Schauspielhaus, Hamburg
- 28 June 2010 - Volksbühne, Berlin
- 29 June 2010 - Malta Festival, Poznań
- 2 July 2010 - Eurockéennes, Belfort
- 3 July 2010 - Den Atelier, Luxembourg City
- 4 July 2010 - Montreux Jazz Festival, Montreux
- 8 July 2010 - La Cigale, Paris
- 9 July 2010 - La Cigale, Paris
- 10 July 2010 - Les Ardentes, Liège
- 13 July 2010 - Théâtre J Deschamps, Carcassonne
- 14 July 2010 - Traffic Festival, Turin
- 15 July 2010 - Festival Internacional de Benicàssim, Benicàssim
- 16 July 2010 - Les Francofolies de La Rochelle, La Rochelle
- 18 July 2010 - Latitude Festival, Southwold
- 24 October 2010 - Tokyo International Forum, Tokyo
- 26 October 2010 - IMP Hall, Osaka
