= Charlotte for Ever =

Studio album by Charlotte Gainsbourg
- Released: 15 December 1986
- Studio: Dangerous Music Studio, New Jersey; Studio Plus XXX, Paris
- Genre: French pop
- Length: 37:29
- Label: Phonogram, Mercury (Re-release)
- Producer: Billy Rush, Philippe Lerichomme

Charlotte Gainsbourg chronology
Charlotte for Ever (1986)	5:55 (2006)

Professional ratings
Review scores
Source	Rating
AllMusic	4/5 stars

Charlotte for Ever is the debut studio album by Anglo-French musician and actress Charlotte Gainsbourg, released in 1986. All songs except #8 (music by Soviet composer Matvei Blanter) were written by her father, Serge Gainsbourg. In parts of the world, the album was released under the controversial title "Lemon Incest". Mercury Records re-released the album in France in 2007 under the Lemon Incest title.

== Track listing ==
1. "Charlotte for Ever" (music inspired from Aram Khachaturian-Andantino, tableaux d'enfance, Serge Gainsbourg) – a duet with her father – 3:56
2. "Ouvertures éclair" (Serge Gainsbourg) – 4:01
3. "Oh Daddy Oh" (Serge Gainsbourg) – 4:19
4. "Don't Forget to Forget Me" (Serge Gainsbourg) – 4:43
5. "Pour ce que tu n'étais pas" (Serge Gainsbourg) – 3:17
6. "Plus doux avec moi" (Serge Gainsbourg) – a duet with her father – 5:03
7. "Élastique" (Serge Gainsbourg) – 3:06
8. "Zéro pointé vers l'infini" (Matvei Blanter, Serge Gainsbourg) – 3:51

Bonus track on the international version (Lemon Incest)

9. "Lemon Incest" (Serge Gainsbourg, Frédéric Chopin) – a duet with her father – 5:13

Notes

Track 2 "Ouvertures éclair" same music as "Travelling" from the album Bande Originale du Film Tenue de soirée
Track 3 "Oh Daddy Oh" same music has "Quand le sexe te chope" from the single Bande Originale du Film "Sex Shop"
Track 4 "Don't Forget to Forget Me" English adaptation of "Souviens-toi de m'oublier" from the Catherine Deneuves album Souviens-toi de m'oublier
Track 8 "Zéro pointé vers l'infini" music inspired from a traditional Russian song
Track 9 "Lemon Incest" after Étude n°3 en mi majeur op. 10 by Frédéric Chopin

== Personnel ==
- Charlotte Gainsbourg – vocals
- Serge Gainsbourg – vocals (tracks 1, 6), lyrics, music
- Billy Rush – guitar, conductor
- John Kumnick – bass guitar
- Gary Georgett – keyboards
- Tony Smith – drums
- Stan Harrison – saxophone
- The Simms Brothers (George and Steve Simms) – chorus
- Dominique Blanc-Francard, Hubert Blanc-Francard – vocal recording
- Jay Vicari – recording
- Billy Rush, Philippe Lerichomme – production
