= Karine Tuil =

French writer

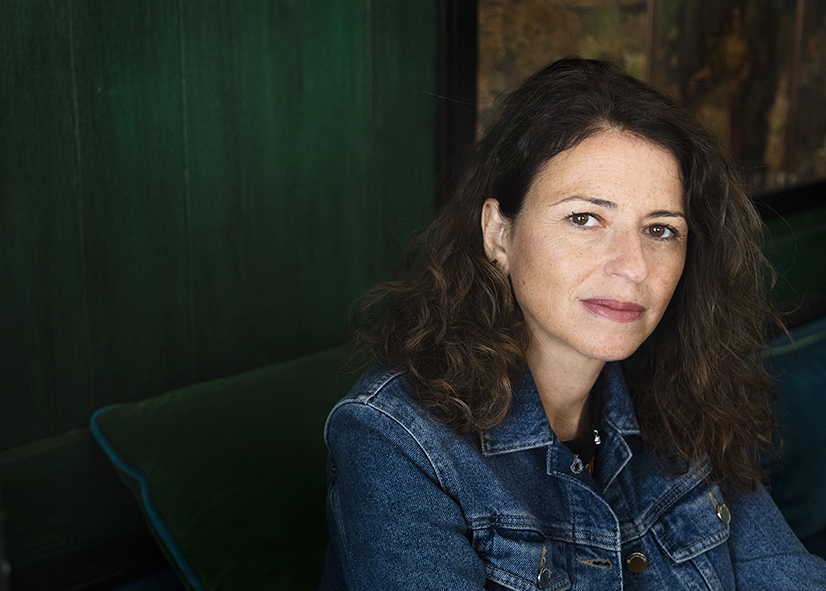
Tuil in 2019

Karine Tuil (born 3 May 1972 in Paris) is a French novelist who has written several award-winning novels in French and English. Her works have themes ranging from marriage and Jewish identity to detention centers and corporate politics.

== Background ==
Tuil was born in Paris on 3 May 1972. After obtaining her baccalaureate, she studied law, and received a Diploma of Advanced Studies in Communication Law at the University of Paris II (Panthéon Assas). Tuil was practicing as a lawyer but prepared a thesis she did not defend. She then decided to devote herself to writing.

== Career ==
Tuil's first published novel, Pour le Pire, was noticed by Jean-Marie Rouart. It was published in September 2000 by Plon publishing house. The novel describes the slow decomposition of a couple. Her second novel, Forbidden, (Plon 2001) – a satirical account of the identity crisis of an old Jew – was selected for the prize Goncourt Prize and the Wizo Prize. It is translated in several languages and was adapted to the theater by Salomé Lelouch in 2014 under the title The marriage of Mr Wessmann.

Female Sex, published in 2002 is a comedy about mother-daughter relationships. This third novel concludes her trilogy on the Jewish family. In 2003, she published Tout sur mon frère, (Éditions Grasset), which explores the negative effects of autofiction. It was nominated for the Booksellers' Prize and was a finalist for the France-Television Award.

In 2005, Tuil published When I Was Funny, which is a French comedy set in New York. In 2007, Douce France appeared, a social novel about administrative detention centers.

In 2008, Tuil released Domination. It is about power politics in the publishing world through the prisms of identity. Domination was a first selections for the Goncourt prize, the Goncourt high school prize and the Flore prize. Tuil she received the Stendhal Scholarship from the Ministry of Foreign Affairs for this novel.

In 2010, her novel Six Months, Six Days was a first and second selection of the 2010 Goncourt Prize, the first selection of the Interallié Prize and the Goncourt high school students' prize. In 2011, she won the prix littéraire du Roman News.

Tuil's ninth novel entitled L'Invention de nos vies was published in September 2013 by the Grasset publishing house. This novel looks at "the story of a young man of Arab descent, Samir, who, to succeed in his career as a business lawyer in New York," borrows "part of the identity of his best childhood friend, a Jew named Samuel " . The novel appeared in several selections of literary prizes, including the Femina, Interallié, Goncourt, Goncourt high school students, and the prix des libraires. It was a finalist of the Goncourt Prize. L'Invention de nos vies was translated in several countries including Great Britain, the United States (under the title The age of reinvention), Canada, Italy, China, Greece, the Netherlands, and Germany.

Tuil's novel The Insouciance was published in 2016. On the publication of this tenth novel, the newspaper Le Monde in 2016 writes, on all her books: "Some themes are obvious. For example the Jewishness of the characters. And subsequently: the father, the law, the Kafkaesque humor - Insouciance adds in the author's Letter to the father". The novel won the Landerneau Prize for readers.

== Awards and distinctions ==
- 2011, Fiction News Prize for Six Months, Six Days 5
- Prix littéraires Les Lauriers Verts (The Green Laurels Literary Award) in the 2013 fiction category for the L'Invention de nos vies.
- On 23 April 2014, Karine Tuil received Chevalier de l'ordre des arts et des lettres (The Knight's Order Insignia of arts and letters), given by Aurélie Filippetti, Minister of Culture and Communication.
- The Carefree was selected in 2016 for the Goncourt prize – the grand prize of the French Academy – and the Interallié, and received the Landerneau Prize of the readers on October 5, 2016 21 .
- On 23 March 2017, Audrey Azoulay, Minister of Culture and Communication awarded her the rank of Officer of the Order of Arts and Letters.
- Les Choses humaines was awarded the 2019 Prix Interallié and the 2019 Prix Goncourt des Lycéens.

== Works ==
- 2000 : Pour le pire (Plon, Pocket 11352) (ISBN 2-259-19294-7)
- 2001 : Interdit (Plon, Pocket 11613, Grasset 2010, Paperback) (ISBN 2-259-19520-2)
- 2002 : Du sexe féminin (Plon, Pocket 11941, Pocket Book) (ISBN 2-259-19708-6)
- 2003 : Tout sur mon frère (Grasset, Paperback 30276) (ISBN 2-246-65401-7)
- 2005 : Quand j'étais drôle (Grasset, Livre de Poche) (ISBN 2-246-65411-4)
- 2007 : Douce France (Grasset, Paperback) (ISBN 2246709911)
- 2008 : La Domination (Grasset, Paperback) (ISBN 2246739217)
- 2010 : Six mois, six jours (Grasset, Livre de Poche) (ISBN 978-2246758310)
- 2013 : L'Invention de nos vies (Grasset, Livre de Poche) (ISBN 978-2-246-80752-0) (translated into English as The Age of Reinvention in 2015)
- 2016 : L'Insouciance (Gallimard) (ISBN 978-2-070-14619-2)
- 2019 : Les Choses humaines (Gallimard) (ISBN 978-2-07-272933-1)
- 2022 : La décision (Gallimard) (ISBN 978-2-07-294354-6)

Participation

- 2017: Collective, Qu'est-ce que la gauche?, Fayard

== Adaptations of her work ==
- 2014–2015: The Wedding of Mr Wessmann, based on the work Forbidden, adaptation of Salomé Lelouch, theater La Bruyère from October 2014 to June 2015; Avignon Festival in July 2015.
- 2021: The Accusation, based on her 2019 novel Les Choses humaines, adapted by Yvan Attal and Yaël Langmann.
