= Talking It Over =

1991 novel by Julian Barnes

- First edition (UK)
- Author: Julian Barnes
- Cover artist: Fraser Taylor
- Language: English
- Publisher: Jonathan Cape (UK); Alfred A. Knopf (US)
- Publication date: 1991
- Publication place: United Kingdom
- Media type: Print, Audio & eBook
- Pages: 278
- ISBN: 0-224-03157-0
- Followed by: Love, etc

Talking It Over is a novel by Julian Barnes published in 1991, it won the Prix Femina Étranger the following year.

It concerns a love triangle in which each of the three people concerned (and occasionally others) take it in turns to tell the story from their perspective using first person narrative. Stuart and Oliver have been best friends since school but are opposite in character. As Stuart is marrying Gillian, Oliver falls in love with her and plots to win her reciprocal affection.

The story is continued in the novel Love, etc set 10 years later.

== Film Adaptation ==
In 1996 Talking it Over was adapted into a French film also called Love Etc. starring Yvan Attal, Charles Berling and Charlotte Gainsbourg.
