= 5:55 =

Studio album by Charlotte Gainsbourg
- Released: 28 August 2006
- Genre: Indie pop, dream pop
- Length: 42:37
- Language: English, French
- Label: Because Music, Atlantic, Vice
- Producer: Nigel Godrich

Charlotte Gainsbourg chronology
Charlotte for Ever (1986)	5:55 (2006)	IRM (2009)

Singles from 5:55
- 1. "The Songs That We Sing" Released: 2006; 2. "5:55" Released: 2007; 3. "The Operation" Released: 2007; 4. "Beauty Mark" Released: 2007

Professional ratings
Aggregate scores
Source	Rating
Metacritic	72/100
Review scores
Source	Rating
AllMusic	4/5 stars
The Guardian	4/5 stars
The Observer	5/5 stars
Pitchfork Media	(5.8/10)
The Times	3/5 stars

5:55 is the second studio album by French and British musician and actress Charlotte Gainsbourg. It was also her first album in twenty years. Charlotte collaborated on the album with French duo Air, English musician Jarvis Cocker, Irish singer-songwriter Neil Hannon, and Radiohead producer Nigel Godrich. "The Songs That We Sing" and "5:55" were released as singles. The album went platinum in France, selling over 500,000 copies. In the United States, the album sold 22,000 copies. "The Songs That We Sing" was No. 78 on Rolling Stone's list of the 100 Best Songs of 2007.

Charlotte sang most of the album in English. In France, the album received critical acclaim. Pitchfork described its erotic lyrical content as reminiscent of Serge Gainsbourg's, and Charlotte's vocal approach as similar to that of Jane Birkin. Overall, the album received "generally favorable reviews" according to the review aggregator website Metacritic.

The first single, "The Songs That We Sing" was also included in the soundtrack to the 2009 film The Uninvited.

In 2012 it was awarded a platinum certification from the Independent Music Companies Association which indicated sales of at least 400,000 copies throughout Europe.

== Track listing ==
All music is composed by Nicolas Godin and Jean-Benoît Dunckel.

No.	Title	Lyrics	Length
1.	"5:55"	Jarvis Cocker; Godin; Dunckel	4:52
2.	"AF607105"	Cocker	4:30
3.	"The Operation"	Cocker	3:59
4.	"Tel que tu es"	Godin; Dunckel	3:09
5.	"The Songs That We Sing"	Neil Hannon; Cocker	2:57
6.	"Beauty Mark"	Hannon; Cocker; Godin; Dunckel	3:06
7.	"Little Monsters"	Cocker	3:46
8.	"Jamais"	Cocker	4:37
9.	"Night-Time Intermission"	Cocker; Charlotte Gainsbourg	2:44
10.	"Everything I Cannot See"	Cocker	5:45
11.	"Morning Song"	Cocker; Gainsbourg	3:08

=== Bonus tracks ===
On some releases one or two bonus tracks were added.

No.	Title	Lyrics	Length
12.	"Set Yourself on Fire"	Cocker	4:10
13.	"Somewhere Between Waking and Sleeping"	Hannon; Cocker	3:45

== Personnel ==
- Charlotte Gainsbourg – vocals
- Jean-Benoît Dunckel – piano, organ, synthesizer, glockenspiel, vibraphone, backing vocals, synth drums
- Nicolas Godin – acoustic guitar, electric guitar, 12-string guitar, bass, glockenspiel, synth drums, synthesizer, tambourine, melodica, percussion
- Jarvis Cocker – lyricist
- Neil Hannon – acoustic guitar
- Jeremy Stacey – drums
- Tony Allen – drums
- The Millennia Ensemble – strings
- David Richard Campbell – string arrangements, conductor
- Joby Talbot – string arrangements

Technical

- Nigel Godrich – production, mixing
- Bob Ludwig – mastering
- Dan Grech-Marguerat – engineering
- Darrell Thorp – engineering
- Florian Lagatta – engineering

== Chart performance ==
=== Album ===
Chart (2006/2007)	Peak position
French Albums Chart	1
Austrian Albums Chart	41
Belgian Albums Chart (Flanders)	15
Belgian Albums Chart (Wallonia)	2
Dutch Albums Chart	99
European Billboard Top 100 Albums	14
German Albums Chart	38
Swedish Albums Chart	57
Swiss Albums Chart	12
UK Albums Chart	78
US Billboard 200	196
US Billboard Top Heatseekers	9
US Billboard Top Independent Albums	24

=== Singles ===
"The Songs That We Sing"

Chart (2006/2007)	Peak position
French SNEP Singles Chart	30
Belgian Ultratip Chart (Flanders)	10
Belgian Ultratip Chart (Wallonia)	4
UK Singles Chart	129
Billboard European Hot 100 Singles	87

== Release history ==
Region	Date	Label	Format	Catalog	Notes
France	28 August 2006	Because Music	CD	3116662	
France	28 August 2006	Because Music	Enhanced CD	3116672	Limited edition, with bonus track "Set Yourself on Fire". Enhanced section includes a Flash version of the booklet including lyrics, pictures and credits.
France	4 September 2006	Because Music	LP album	BEC5772052	Double album.
UK	4 September 2006	Because Music, Atlantic Records	5051011-5911-2-9		
Europe	4 September 2006	Because Music, Warner Music	2564-63652-2		
Japan	8 November 2006	Warner Music	CD	WPCR-12431	With bonus tracks "Set Yourself on Fire" and "Somewhere Between Waking and Sleeping"
US	24 April 2007	Vice Records	Enhanced CD	94703-2	With bonus tracks "Set Yourself on Fire" and "Somewhere Between Waking and Sleeping". Enhanced section includes the promotional videos of "The Songs That We Sing" and "5:55" and an interview with Gainsbourg.
