= The Songs That We Sing =

Single by Charlotte Gainsbourg

Single by Charlotte Gainsbourg

from the album 5:55
- Released: 2006
- Genre: Indie pop, dream pop
- Label: Because
- Songwriter(s): Jarvis Cocker, Neil Hannon
- Producer(s): Nigel Godrich

Charlotte Gainsbourg singles chronology
| "If" (2004) | "The Songs That We Sing" (2006) | "5:55" (2007) |

Music video
- "The Songs That We Sing" on YouTube

"The Songs That We Sing" is the first single from the album 5:55 by Charlotte Gainsbourg.

== Critical reception ==
Rolling Stone placed "The Songs That We Sing" at #78 on its 100 Best Songs of 2007 list.

== Chart performance ==
"The Songs That We Sing" debuted at #36 on the French Singles Chart before climbing to and peaking at #30 in its third week. The song spent a total of 30 weeks on the chart.

== Track listings ==
- French CD single
1. "The Songs That We Sing" – 2:57
2. "Set Yourself On Fire" – 4:08
- UK CD single
1. "The Songs That We Sing" – 3:01
2. "Jamais" – 4:38

== Song usage ==
"The Songs That We Sing" was used in the 2009 film The Uninvited.

== Charts ==
| Chart (2006) | Peak position |
|---|---|
| Belgian Tip Chart (Flanders) | 10 |
| Belgian Tip Chart (Wallonia) | 4 |
| European Hot 100 Singles | 87 |
| French Singles Chart | 30 |
| UK Singles Chart | 129 |
