= Charlotte Gainsbourg =

French and British actress and singer (born 1971)

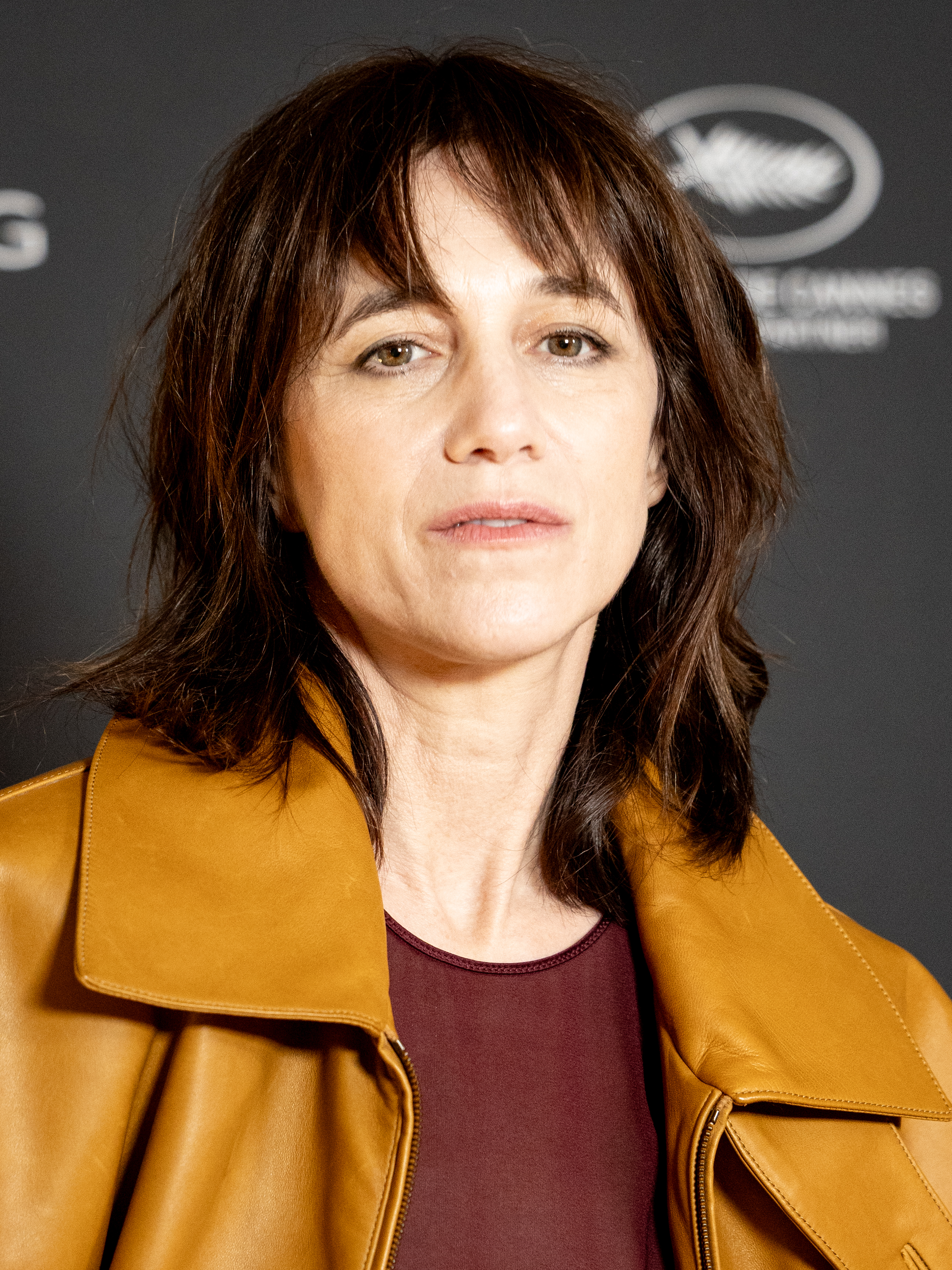
- Gainsbourg in 2025
- Born: Charlotte Lucy Gainsbourg; 21 July 1971 (age 55); Marylebone, London, England
- Citizenship: France; United Kingdom
- Occupations: Actress; singer
- Years active: 1984–present
- Partner: Yvan Attal (c. 1991–present)
- Children: 3
- Parents: Serge Gainsbourg; Jane Birkin
- Relatives: Kate Barry (half-sister); Lou Doillon (half-sister); Judy Campbell (grandmother); Andrew Birkin (uncle); David Birkin (cousin); Anno Birkin (cousin)
- Musical career
- Genres: Alternative rock; indie pop; dream pop; French pop (early)
- Labels: Phonogram; Because; Atlantic; Vice; Elektra
- Website: charlotte-gainsbourg.com

Charlotte Lucy Gainsbourg (French: [ʃaʁlɔt ɡɛ̃zbuʁ]; born 21 July 1971) is a French and British actress and singer. She is the daughter of English actress and singer Jane Birkin and French singer Serge Gainsbourg. After making her musical debut with her father on the song "Lemon Incest" at the age of 12, she released an album with her father at the age of 15. More than 20 years passed before Gainsbourg released albums as an adult (5:55, IRM, Stage Whisper and Rest), to commercial and critical success. She has acted in many films, including collaborations with Lars von Trier, and received two César Awards and Cannes Film Festival's Best Actress Award, among many nominations.

== Background ==
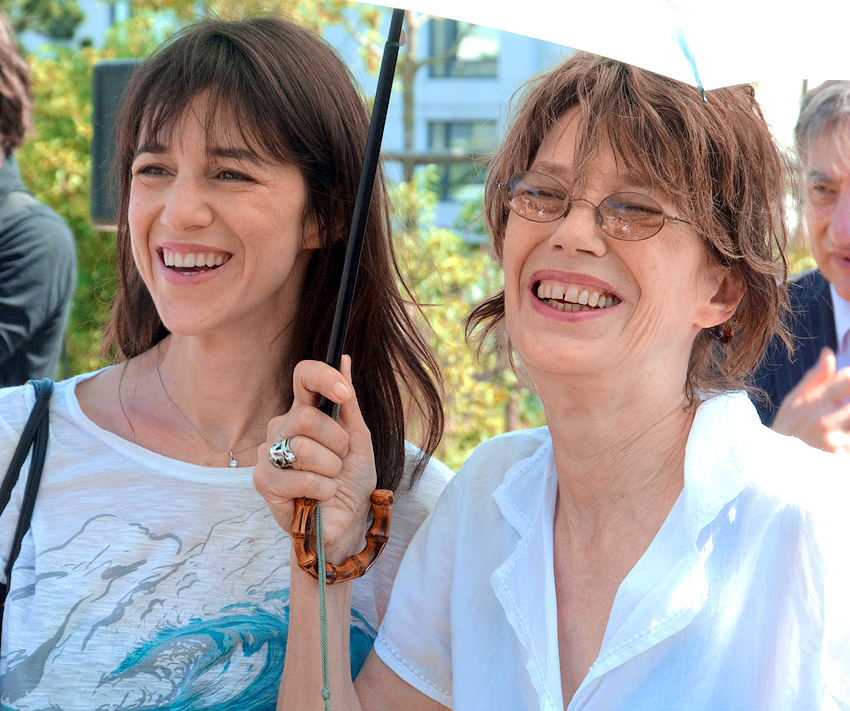
Gainsbourg with her mother Jane Birkin in 2010

Gainsbourg was born on 21 July 1971 in the Marylebone area of Central London. Her mother was English actress and singer Jane Birkin. Her father was French musician Serge Gainsbourg. Gainsbourg was born at the height of her parents' fame; they had made headlines three years earlier with the sexually explicit song "Je t'aime... moi non plus" and by that point had become notorious for their turbulent relationship and multiple artistic collaborations. As a result, her childhood was well publicised.

At birth, she received the surname of Gainsbourg, her father's stage name, but at the age of 18, she changed her surname to Ginsburg, her father's legal surname. She has continued to use the Gainsbourg name professionally.

Her maternal grandmother was actress Judy Campbell, and her uncle is screenwriter Andrew Birkin, who directed her in The Cement Garden. She is a cousin of theatre and opera director Sophie Hunter. Gainsbourg's father was Jewish, whereas her mother is from a Protestant background. Gainsbourg attended École Active Bilingue Jeannine Manuel in Paris and Collège Alpin International Beau Soleil in Switzerland. French is her first language, but she is also fluent in English.

Gainsbourg was raised in Paris alongside her half-sister, Kate Barry, from her mother's marriage to composer John Barry. Kate Barry died in 2013 after falling out of a window. According to Birkin, both parents were somewhat neglectful, often spending their nights going out to parties and drinking. She has a younger half-brother, Lucien "Lulu" Gainsbourg, born in 1986 from her father's relationship with Bambou. On her father's side, she also had two older half-siblings born from his second marriage to Françoise-Antoinette "Béatrice" Pancrazzi.

By 1980, her parents' relationship had dissolved, and her mother left her father for the director Jacques Doillon. Her half-sister Lou Doillon was born in 1982 as a result of the union. Gainsbourg would go on to work with her stepfather in the 1985 film The Temptation of Isabelle and later in the 1992 film Amoureuse, which also starred her future partner Yvan Attal.

In 1987, she was the target of a bungled kidnapping.

After her parents separated, Gainsbourg's father descended into alcoholism, eventually dying of a heart attack in 1991. Gainsbourg remained devoted to preserving his legacy and preserved his home, saying she hoped to eventually turn it into a museum. Maison Gainsbourg opened in 2023.

== Career ==
=== Acting ===
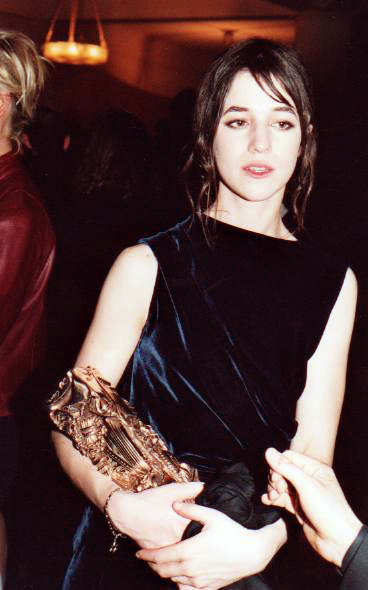
Gainsbourg at the 25th César Awards in 2000

Gainsbourg grew up on film sets, as both of her parents were involved in the film industry. She stated that her mother had pushed her into acting, believing that she wanted to be an actress and encouraging her to make her motion picture debut playing Catherine Deneuve's daughter in the film Paroles et Musique (1984).

In 1986, Gainsbourg won a César Award for "Most Promising Actress" for An Impudent Girl. That same year, Gainsbourg appeared in the film Charlotte for Ever about a man who develops incestuous desires for his teenage daughter after his wife dies. Written and directed by Gainsbourg's father Serge Gainsbourg, who also took the role of Gainsbourg's father on screen, the film heightened the controversy that had resulted from Gainsbourg's debut single "Lemon Incest", which had similar themes and also was created and sung with her father Serge, causing press speculation that the material was autobiographical.

In 1988, she appeared with her mother in the films Kung Fu Master and the documentary drama Jane B. by Agnes V., both directed by Agnès Varda. In 1993, Gainsbourg made her English-language debut in The Cement Garden, written and directed by her uncle, Andrew Birkin. Her stage debut was in 1994, in David Mamet's Oleanna at the Théâtre de la Gaîté-Montparnasse. In 1996, Gainsbourg starred as the title character in Jane Eyre, a film adaptation of Charlotte Brontë's 1847 novel. In 2000, she won the César Award for "Best Supporting Actress" for the film La Bûche.

In 2003, Gainsbourg starred in 21 Grams, with Naomi Watts, Sean Penn and Benicio del Toro. In 2006, Gainsbourg appeared alongside Gael García Bernal in Michel Gondry's The Science of Sleep. In 2007, she appeared as Claire in the Todd Haynes-directed Bob Dylan biographical film I'm Not There, also contributing a cover version of the Dylan song "Just Like a Woman" to the film soundtrack. In 2009, she won the award for Best Actress at the 2009 Cannes Film Festival for the film Antichrist. Gainsbourg starred in the French/Australian production The Tree, released in 2010, and in Lars von Trier's science fiction disaster film Melancholia. She was on the jury for the 62nd Berlin International Film Festival in February 2012. In May 2012, Confession of a Child of the Century premiered, in which she starred alongside the British musician Pete Doherty.

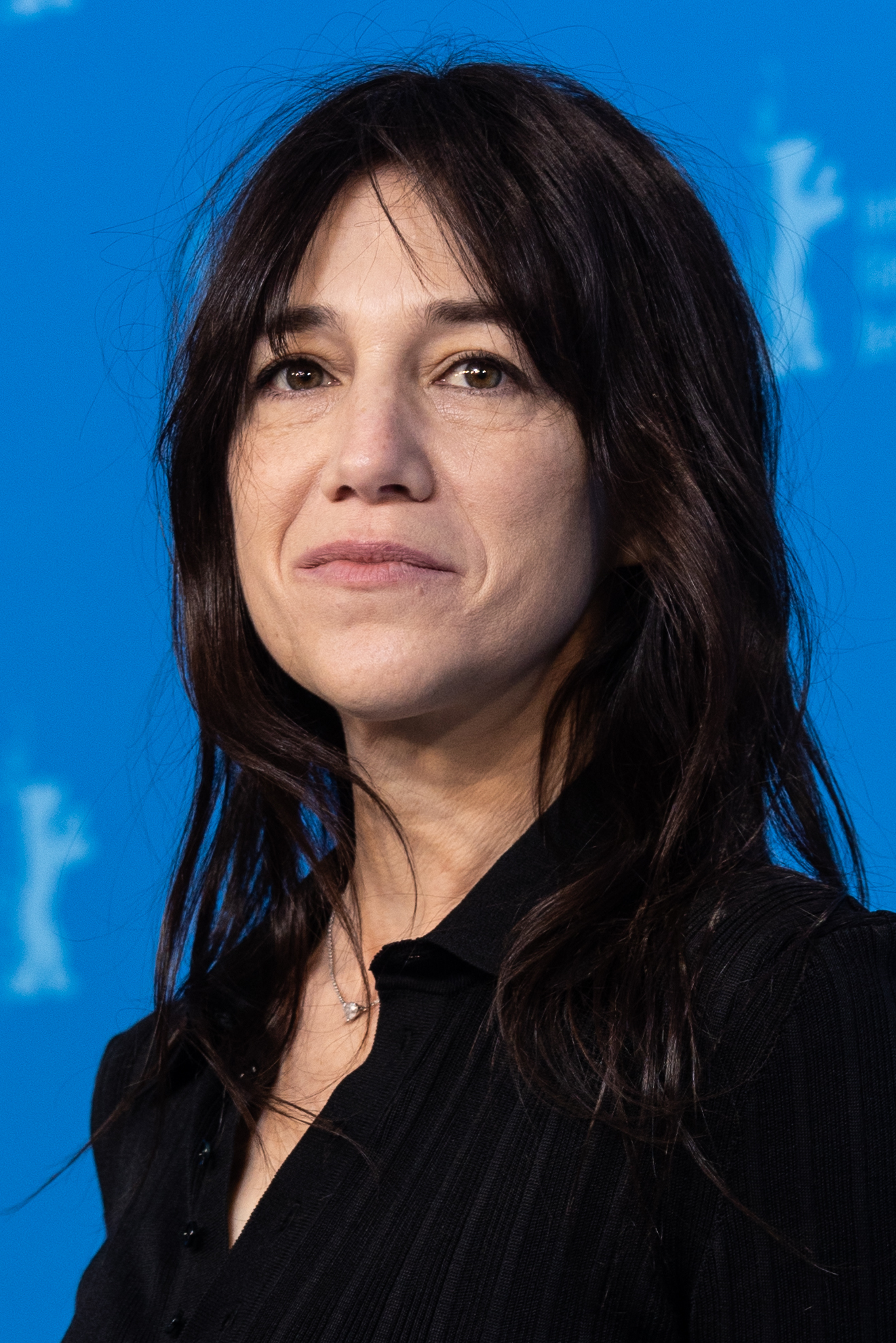
Gainsbourg at the 2022 Berlinale

Gainsbourg worked with von Trier once again on his 2013 film Nymphomaniac, in which she played the title role. The 5½-hour film depicts the life of a sex addict from youth to middle age. Regarding her reservations about the part, Gainsbourg commented, "The sex scenes weren't so hard. For me, it was all the masochistic scenes. Those were embarrassing and, yes, a little humiliating." In 2014, she starred in Three Hearts and Éric Toledano and Olivier Nakache's film Samba, for which she was nominated for a Lumière Award for Best Actress. She then played Dr. Catherine Marceaux in Independence Day: Resurgence (2016), sequel of the 1996 film Independence Day. In 2017, she starred alongside Michael Fassbender and Rebecca Ferguson in the crime thriller film The Snowman. In 2020, Gainsbourg had a guest role playing herself in the first episode of the fourth season of Call My Agent!.

=== Music ===
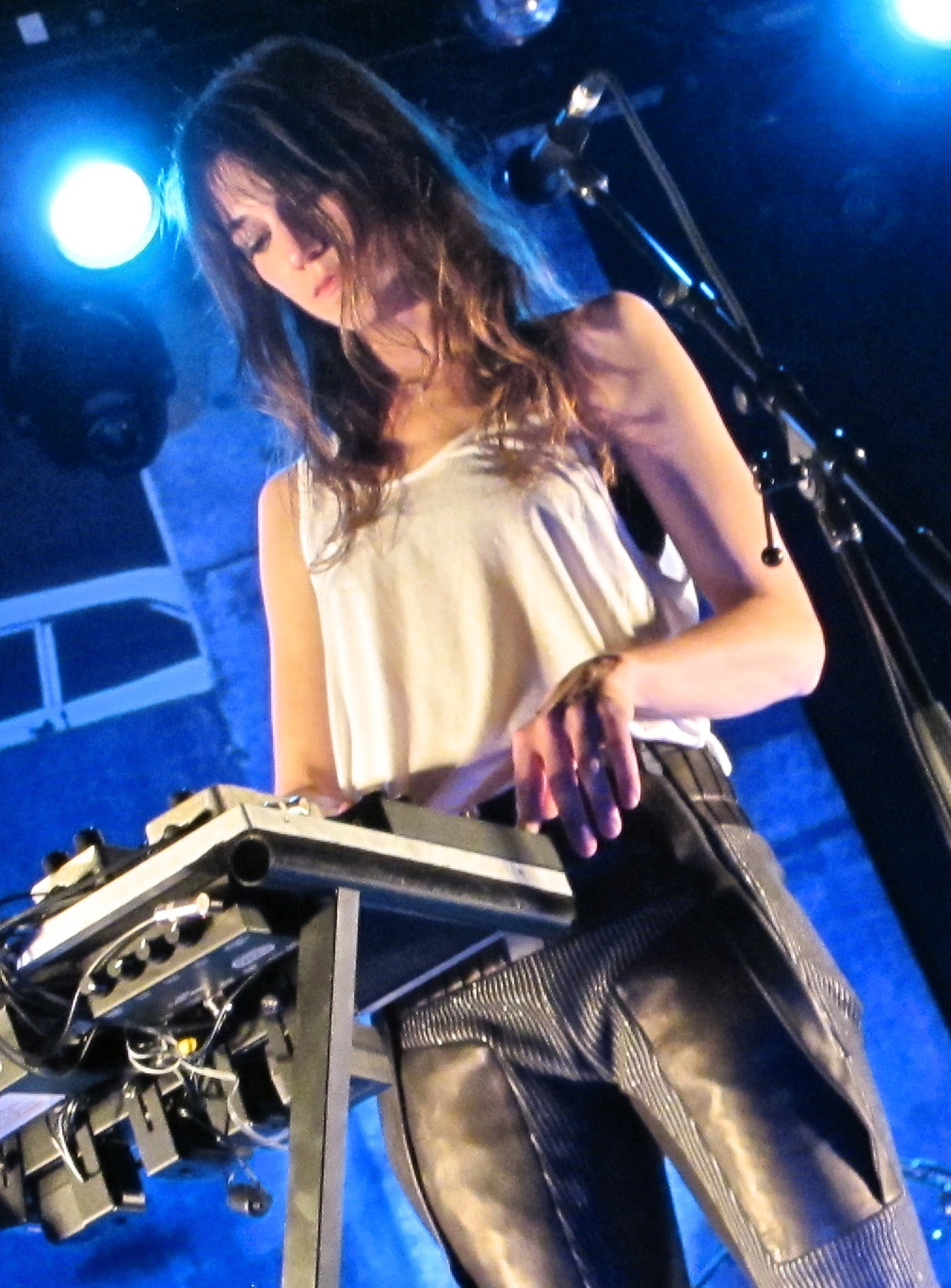
Gainsbourg at Webster Hall, New York City, April 2010

Gainsbourg made her musical debut on the controversial song "Lemon Incest" in 1984. Sung by Gainsbourg and her father Serge, the lyrics implied a pedophiliac relationship between a father and daughter and led people to believe that the material was autobiographical. Gainsbourg, who was 13 at the time of the song's release, later stated that she had just begun boarding school and was therefore unaware of the controversy regarding the song until she was much older.

In 1986, she released her debut album Charlotte for Ever, which was produced by her father. In 2000, Gainsbourg was featured on the Madonna album Music on the track "What It Feels Like for a Girl". The lengthy spoken introduction by Gainsbourg is taken from the film The Cement Garden, which inspired the title of the song. The track was further remixed for a single version in 2001, with Gainsbourg's The Cement Garden speech repeated during the song.

In 2000, Gainsbourg was featured on the Soundwalk Collective with Patti Smith album Peradam on the track "The Four Cardinal Times".

In 2004, she sang a duet with French pop star Étienne Daho on his single "If". In 2006, Gainsbourg released her second album 5:55 to critical acclaim and commercial success, reaching the top spot on the French charts and achieving platinum status in that country. In the UK, the album was moderately successful, peaking at No. 78. (The single "The Songs That We Sing" only reached No. 129.) Gainsbourg attributed the twenty-year break between her debut album and 5:55 to her father's death and her reluctance to explore a musical career without him.

In late 2009, Gainsbourg released her third studio album, IRM, which was produced by Beck. One of the influential factors in the album's creative process was her time spent filming Antichrist. Gainsbourg's head injury in 2007 influenced the title of the album IRM, an abbreviation for the French translation of magnetic resonance imaging (MRI). During her brain scan, she began to think about music. "When I was inside that machine," she said, "it was an escape to think about music. It's rhythm. It was very chaotic."

Her song "Heaven Can Wait" was chosen as the Starbucks iTunes Pick of the Week on 2 March 2010. Her song "Trick Pony" appeared at the beginning of the Grey's Anatomy episode "Perfect Little Accident" (Season 6, Episode 16/airdate: 25 February 2010), is featured on the FIFA 11 soundtrack, was used in the 2012 Teleflora Super Bowl advertisement featuring supermodel Adriana Lima and can be heard in episode 2 ("Wild Thing") of the Amazon Prime Video television series My Lady Jane (2024).

In 2011, Gainsbourg released the compilation album Stage Whisper, a collection of unreleased songs from IRM and live tracks. In 2013, Gainsbourg released a cover version of the song "Hey Joe", recorded with Beck, for the soundtrack of the film Nymphomaniac, in which she was the lead actress. Her music influenced artists such as Tove Lo, who cited the simplicity and quirky lyrical content of Charlotte's IRM as the main inspiration behind her career in music and said that it "opened a new world" for her as regards sound, and she performed a bilingual cover of "The Maiden's Prayer" in French and English as the opening tune for the Anglo-French crime thriller television serial The Tunnel.

Since 2014, Gainsbourg has been supporting the Hear the World Foundation as ambassador. In this role, she advocates for equal opportunities and a better quality of life for people with hearing loss. She was featured in the Hear the World Calendar 2014, the proceeds of which were to benefit the foundation's projects.

Gainsbourg worked for four years, mainly in New York, with producer Sebastian Akchoté (known as SebastiAn) on her fourth studio album, titled Rest. Rest is a portrayal of her feelings after the deaths of her father Serge Gainsbourg and her half-sister Kate Barry, with the theme of alcohol addiction. About the album, she said: "The album took a different direction. I wanted to express [my grief] not only with sadness but with anger." The lyrics are in English and French. In September 2017, music videos for the singles "Rest" and "Deadly Valentine" were released; both were directed by Gainsbourg herself. The music videos feature her children. The album was released on 17 November 2017. A companion EP for Rest was released the following year, titled Take 2. Gainsbourg additionally featured on Akchoté's second studio album Thirst in November 2019.

Throughout late November 2020, Gainsbourg posted images on social media of herself in the recording studio with Irish-Scottish music producer Salvador Navarrete, better known by his stage name Sega Bodega. Navarrete described the sessions as "sounding beautiful". It was unveiled in September 2021 that Gainsbourg would appear on Navarrete's second studio album, Romeo, which was released on 12 November 2021. It is expected that more music between the two will be released.

== Personal life ==
Gainsbourg's longtime partner is French-Israeli actor/director Yvan Attal, whom she met on the set of the 1991 film Aux yeux du monde. Gainsbourg and Attal are not married, and Gainsbourg has attributed her reluctance to her parents never marrying. Attal publicly proposed to Gainsbourg on 19 June 2013, during an awards ceremony when he received the French National Order of Merit. In April 2014, Attal confirmed that they were still unmarried, with no plans to marry. Together they have three children, born in 1996, 2002, and 2011. Their oldest, Ben Attal, is also an actor, who starred in the film The Accusation (2021). Gainsbourg identifies as Jewish and celebrates Jewish holidays with her partner's family.

Gainsbourg was born in London, but she spent most of her life in Paris until the death of her sister Kate Barry. In 2013, she and her family relocated to New York City. They returned to Paris in 2020. She is proud of both her British and French nationalities.

On 5 September 2007, Gainsbourg underwent surgery for a cerebral hemorrhage. She had been experiencing headaches since a waterskiing accident in the United States several weeks earlier.

In 2025, she signed a call for legally condemning anti-Zionism as antisemitism.

== Filmography ==
=== Film ===
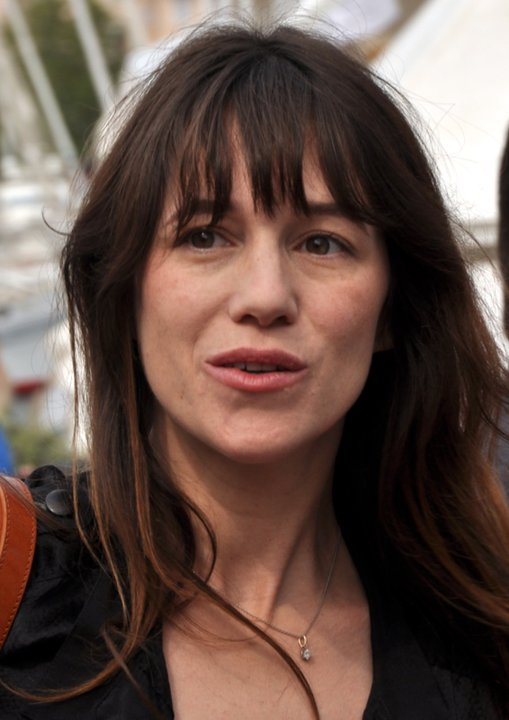
Gainsbourg at the 2011 Cannes Film Festival

Year	Title	Role	Notes
1984	Paroles et Musique	Charlotte Marker	
1985	La tentation d'Isabelle	The child	
1985	An Impudent Girl	Charlotte Castang	
1986	Charlotte for Ever	Charlotte	
1988	Kung Fu Master	Lucy	
1988	Jane B. par Agnès V.	Jane Birkin's daughter	
1988	The Little Thief	Janine Castang	
1990	The Sun Also Shines at Night	Matilda	
1991	Merci la vie	Camille Pelleveau	
1991	Aux yeux du monde	Juliette Mangin	
1992	Amoureuse	Marie	
1993	The Cement Garden	Julie	
1994	Dead Tired	Herself	
1996	Jane Eyre	Jane Eyre	
1996	Anna Oz	Anna Oz	
1996	Love, etc.	Marie	
1999	The Intruder	Catherine Girard	
1999	Season's Beatings	Milla Robin	
2000	Passionnément	Alice Almeida	
2001	Félix et Lola	Lola	
2001	My Wife Is an Actress	Charlotte	
2002	La merveilleuse odyssée de l'idiot Toboggan	Voice	
2003	21 Grams	Mary Rivers	
2004	Une star internationale	Herself	Short film
2004	Happily Ever After	Gabrielle	
2005	L'un reste, l'autre part	Judith	
2005	Lemming	Bénédicte Getty	
2006	Nuovomondo	Lucy Reed	
2006	I Do	Emma	
2006	The Science of Sleep	Stéphanie	
2007	I'm Not There	Claire Clark	
2008	The City of Your Final Destination	Arden Langdon	
2009	Antichrist	She	
2009	Persécution	Sonia	
2010	The Tree	Dawn	
2011	Melancholia	Claire	
2012	Confession of a Child of the Century	Brigitte	
2012	Do Not Disturb	Lilly	
2013	Nymphomaniac	Joe	
2014	Jacky in Women's Kingdom	La colonelle	
2014	Son épouse	Catherine de Rosa	
2014	Samba	Alice	
2014	Three Hearts	Sylvie Berger	
2014	Misunderstood	Mother	
2015	Every Thing Will Be Fine	Kate	
2016	The Jews	Mathilde Bensoussan	
2016	Independence Day: Resurgence	Dr. Catherine Marceaux	
2016	Norman	Alex Green	
2016	Dark Crimes	Kasia	
2017	Ismael's Ghosts	Sylvia	
2017	The Snowman	Rakel Fauke	
2017	Promise at Dawn	Nina Kacew	
2018	I Think We're Alone Now	Violet	
2018	The House that Jack Built	Claire/Joe	Two archive footages (Melancholia and Nymphomaniac); uncredited
2019	Lux Æterna	Charlotte	
2019	My Dog Stupid	Cécile Mohen	
2020	Suzanna Andler	Suzanna Andler	
2021	Jane by Charlotte	Herself	Director and producer
2021	Sundown	Alice Bennett	
2021	The Accusation	Claire Farel	
2022	The Passengers of the Night	Elisabeth	
2022	The Almond and the Seahorse	Toni	
2022	The Pale Blue Eye	Patsy	
2023	Life for Real	Roxane	
2024	We, the Leroys	Sandrine Leroy	
2025	The Phoenician Scheme	1st Wife	
2026	Women on Trial	Gisèle Halimi	
2026	Only What We Carry	Josephine Chabrol	

=== Television ===
Year	Title	Role	Notes
2000	Nuremberg	Marie Claude Vaillant-Couturier	Miniseries
2000	Les Misérables	Fantine	Miniseries
2020	Call My Agent!	Herself	1 episode
2022	In Therapy	Claire Brunet	6 episodes
2023	Alphonse	Margot	6 episodes
2025	Étoile	Geneviève Lavigne	8 episodes

== Discography ==
=== Studio albums ===
Year	Album details	Peak chart positions										Certifications (sales thresholds)
Year	Album details	FRA	AUT	BEL (FL)	BEL (WA)	GER	NLD	SWE	SWI	UK	US	Certifications (sales thresholds)
1986	Charlotte for Ever: Released: 15 December 1986; Label: Phonogram/Mercury (Re-release)	—	—	—	—	—	—	—	—	—	—	
2006	5:55: Released: 28 August 2006; Label: Because Music/Atlantic/Vice	1	41	15	2	38	99	57	12	78	196	SNEP: Platinum
2009	IRM: Released: 7 December 2009; Label: Because Music/Elektra	4	—	35	8	—	—	46	28	62	69	
2017	Rest: Released: 17 November 2017; Label: Because Music/Atlantic	14	49	18	9	74	—	—	8	89	—	
"—" denotes a recording that did not chart or was not released in that territory.

=== Compilation albums ===
Title	Album details
Stage Whisper	Released: 13 December 2011; Label: Because Music/Elektra

== Awards and nominations ==
- Officer of the Order of Arts and Letters (2016)

Year	Award	Category	Nominated work	Result	Ref.
1986	César Awards	Most Promising Actress	An Impudent Girl	Won	
1989	César Awards	Best Actress	The Little Thief	Nominated	
1997	César Awards	Best Actress	Love, etc.	Nominated	
2000	César Awards	Best Supporting Actress	Season's Beatings	Won	
2007	Globe de Cristal Awards	Best Actress – Motion Picture	I Do	Nominated	
2007	César Awards	Best Actress	I Do	Nominated	
2008	Independent Spirit Awards	Robert Altman Award	I'm Not There	Won	
2009	Cannes Film Festival	Best Actress	Antichrist	Won	
2009	European Film Awards	Best Actress	Antichrist	Nominated	
2010	Bodil Awards	Best Actress in a Leading Role	Antichrist	Won	
2010	Robert Awards	Best Actress in a Leading Role	Antichrist	Nominated	
2010	Australian Film Institute Awards	Best Actress in a Leading Role	The Tree	Nominated	
2011	César Awards	Best Actress	The Tree	Nominated	
2011	European Film Awards	Best Actress	Melancholia	Nominated	
2011	Saturn Awards	Best Supporting Actress	Melancholia	Nominated	
2012	Bodil Awards	Best Actress in a Supporting Role	Melancholia	Nominated	
2012	Robert Awards	Best Actress in a Supporting Role	Melancholia	Won	
2014	Bodil Awards	Best Actress in a Leading Role	Nymphomaniac	Won	
2014	European Film Awards	Best Actress	Nymphomaniac	Nominated	
2015	Robert Awards	Best Actress in a Leading Role	Nymphomaniac	Nominated	
2015	Lumière Awards	Best Actress	Three Hearts and Samba	Nominated	
2018	César Awards	Best Actress	Promise at Dawn	Nominated	
2018	Lumière Awards	Best Actress	Promise at Dawn	Nominated	
2018	Victoires de la Musique	Female Artist of the Year	Herself	Won	
2022	Zurich Film Festival	Golden Eye Award	Herself	Won	

=== Video games ===
Gainsbourg’s music has featured in several video games. Her song “Trick Pony”, from her 2010 album ‘‘IRM’’, was included in the soundtrack of ‘’FIFA 11’’ (2010).FIFPlay, Trick Pony – Charlotte Gainsbourg – FIFA 11 Soundtrack – FIFPlay

== Exhibitions ==
- 2026 – 5bis, La Galerie du Cloître, Arles
