= My Dog Stupid =

2019 French comedy film

- French: Mon chien Stupide
- Directed by: Yvan Attal
- Written by: Dean Craig; Yvan Attal; Yaël Langmann
- Based on: "My Dog Stupid" by John Fante
- Produced by: Vincent Roget; Georges Kern; Florian Genetet-Morel
- Starring: Yvan Attal; Charlotte Gainsbourg
- Cinematography: Rémy Chevrin
- Edited by: Célia Lafitedupont
- Music by: Brad Mehldau
- Production companies: Same Player; Good Times Production; Montauk Films
- Distributed by: StudioCanal
- Release dates: 20 August 2019 (FFA); 30 October 2019 (France)
- Running time: 106 minutes
- Country: France
- Language: French
- Budget: $10 million
- Box office: $4.1 million

My Dog Stupid (French: Mon chien Stupide) is a 2019 French comedy-drama film directed by Yvan Attal and starring Attal and Charlotte Gainsbourg. The screenplay, written by Attal, Dean Craig and Yaël Langmann, is based on the short story of the same name from John Fante's novella West of Rome, published posthumously in 1986.

The film premiered at the 2019 Angoulême Francophone Film Festival and was released in France by StudioCanal on 30 October 2019. As of July 2025, 80% of the 10 critical reviews compiled on Rotten Tomatoes are positive, with an average rating of 6.5/10.

== Cast ==
- Yvan Attal as Henri Mohen
- Charlotte Gainsbourg as Cécile Mohen
- Ben Attal as Raphaël Mohen
- Adèle Wismes as Pauline Mohen
- Pablo Venzal as Noé Mohen
- Panayotis Pascot as Gaspard Mohen
- Éric Ruf as Professor Fréderic Mazard
