= Do Not Disturb (2012 film) =

- Directed by: Yvan Attal
- Written by: Yvan Attal; Olivier Bercot
- Based on: Humpday by Lynn Shelton
- Produced by: Mikael Abecassis
- Starring: François Cluzet; Yvan Attal
- Cinematography: Thomas Hardmeier
- Edited by: Jennifer Augé
- Production companies: Les Films du 24; TF1 Droits Audiovisuels; France 2; Films Sous Influence
- Distributed by: UGC
- Release dates: 14 September 2012 (TIFF); 3 October 2012 (France)
- Running time: 108 minutes
- Country: France
- Language: French

Do Not Disturb is a 2012 French comedy film directed by Yvan Attal and starring Attal and François Cluzet. It is a remake of the 2009 American film Humpday.

== Cast ==
- François Cluzet - Jeff
- Yvan Attal - Ben Azuelos
- Laetitia Casta - Anna Azuelos
- Charlotte Gainsbourg - Lilly
- Asia Argento - Monica
- Joeystarr - Mitch
- Leon - Josh

== Reception ==
Sarah Nicole Prickett of The Globe and Mail gave the film 2 1/12 out of 4 stars, writing that the adaptation's "absurdly sexy" nature undercut its comic premise: "In the original, the awkwardness of two straight guys doing it was heightened by America's morality and Shelton's realist style. In this more erotic French version, it feels like: who cares? Just do it."
