= Love, Etc (novel) =

Novel by Julian Barnes

- First edition (UK)
- Author: Julian Barnes
- Language: English
- Publisher: Jonathan Cape (UK); Knopf (US)
- Publication date: 2000 (UK), 2001 (US)
- Publication place: United Kingdom
- Media type: Print, Audio & eBook
- Pages: 249
- ISBN: 0-224-03101-5
- Preceded by: Talking it Over

Love, Etc is a novel by Julian Barnes published in 2000, although it is also the title of a French film based on his earlier novel Talking It Over.

== Plot ==
Love, Etc was written some ten years after Talking It Over and is set ten years later. In the intervening period Stuart, the protagonist, has emigrated to America, remarried, opened a restaurant, got divorced and returned to England, where he has set up a successful organic food business. Meanwhile, Oliver and Gillian and their two daughters live in a small flat in north-east London, Oliver still seeks success as a writer supported by Gillian's picture restoration. Stuart appears to have forgiven Oliver for stealing his wife and offers him a job as a driver...
