= Yvan Attal =

Israeli-born French actor and director (born 1965)

- איוואן אטל
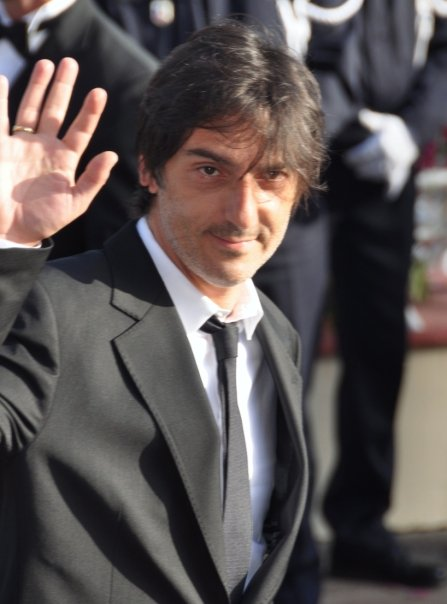
- Attal at the 2009 Cannes Film Festival
- Born: 4 January 1965 (age 61); Tel Aviv, Israel
- Occupations: Actor, director, scriptwriter
- Years active: 1989–present
- Partner: Charlotte Gainsbourg (c. 1991)
- Children: 3

Yvan Attal (French pronunciation: [ivɑ̃ atal]; Hebrew: איוואן אטל; born 4 January 1965) is a French actor, scriptwriter and film director.

== Life and career ==
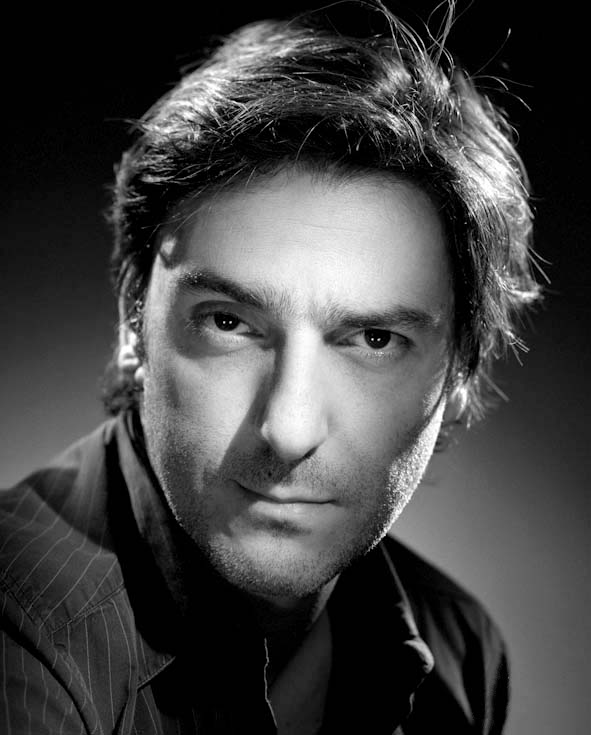
Attal in 2005

Born in Tel Aviv, Israel, to Algerian-Jewish parents, he grew up in the outskirts of Paris. His acting debut was in Éric Rochant's Un monde sans pitié (1989), which earned him a César Award for Most Promising Actor. His first feature film as a director was Ma femme est une actrice (2001), which co-starred Charlotte Gainsbourg, Attal's real-life partner.

He directed a segment in the film New York, I Love You, and appeared as an actor in another.

He acted in The Interpreter and Anthony Zimmer, and in Rush Hour 3 he played a French cab driver named George.

== Personal life ==
Attal's longtime partner is Anglo-French actress-singer Charlotte Gainsbourg, whom he met on the set of the 1991 film Aux yeux du monde. Gainsbourg and Attal are not married, and Gainsbourg has attributed her reluctance to marry to the fact that her parents never married. Attal publicly proposed to Gainsbourg on 19 June 2013 during an awards ceremony when he received the French National Order of Merit. In April 2014, Attal confirmed that they were still unwed with no plans to marry.

Attal has three children with Gainsbourg, including their son Ben Attal, who is also an actor and starred in the film The Accusation (2021). In 2014, following the death of Gainsbourg's sister, photographer Kate Barry, Attal and his family relocated to New York City.

== Filmography ==
Year	Film	Role	Director	Notes
1989	Un monde sans pitié	Halpern	Éric Rochant	César Award for Most Promising Actor; Acteurs à l'Écran – Michel Simon's Award
1991	Cauchemar Blanc		Mathieu Kassovitz	Short film
1991	Mauvais fille	Vincent	Régis Franc	
1991	Aux yeux du monde	Bruno Fournier	Éric Rochant	
1992	Amoureuse	Paul	Jacques Doillon	
1992	Love After Love	Romain	Diane Kurys	
1994	The Patriots	Ariel Brenner	Éric Rochant	
1996	Delphine 1, Yvan 0	a man	Dominique Farrugia	
1996	Portraits chinois	Yves	Martine Dugowson	
1996	Love, etc.	Benoît	Marion Vernoux	
1997	I Got a Woman (Short)	Arnaud	Yvan Attal	Alpe d'Huez International Comedy Film Festival – Best Short Film
1997	Saraka bô	Taïeb	Denis Amar	
1998	Alissa	Luc Kaufmann	Didier Goldschmidt	
1998	Cantique de la racaille	Gaston	Vincent Ravalec	
1999	Mes amis	Eric	Michel Hazanavicius	
1999	With or Without You	Benoit	Michael Winterbottom	
1999	The Criminal	Mason	Julian Simpson	
2000	Le prof	Hippolyte	Alexandre Jardin	
2001	My Wife Is an Actress	Yvan	Yvan Attal	Cabourg Romantic Film Festival – Best Director; Nominated – César Award for Best Debut
2002	And Now... Ladies and Gentlemen	David	Claude Lelouch	
2002	At Dawning (Short)	Falling Man	Martin Jones	
2003	It's Easier for a Camel...	Man in park	Valeria Bruni Tedeschi	
2003	Bon Voyage	Raoul	Jean-Paul Rappeneau	Nominated – César Award for Best Supporting Actor
2004	Happily Ever After	Vincent	Yvan Attal	
2004	Un petit jeu sans conséquence	Bruno	Bernard Rapp	
2005	The Interpreter	Philippe	Sydney Pollack	
2005	Anthony Zimmer	François Taillandier	Jérôme Salle	
2005	Somewhere (Short)	Simon	Emmanuel Murat	
2005	Munich	Tony (Andreas' Friend)	Steven Spielberg	
2006	The Serpent	Vincent Mandel	Éric Barbier	
2007	Le candidat	Michel Dedieu	Niels Arestrup	
2007	Rush Hour 3	George	Brett Ratner	
2008	Manhunt (TV Movie)	Serge Klarsfeld	Laurent Jaoui	
2008	Orange Juice (Short)	Philippe	Ronan Moucheboeuf	
2009	Je suis venu pour elle	Max	Ivan Taieb	
2009	The Ball of the Actresses	Himself	Maïwenn	
2009	Leaving	Samuel	Catherine Corsini	Nominated - Globes de Cristal Award for Best Actor
2009	Les regrets	Mathieu Liévin	Cédric Kahn	
2009	Rapt	Stanislas Graff	Lucas Belvaux	Nominated – César Award for Best Actor
2011	Dans la tourmente	Max	Christophe Ruggia	
2011	R.I.F.	Stephane Monnereau	Franck Mancuso	
2012	One Night	Pierre Morvand	Lucas Belvaux	
2012	Do Not Disturb	Ben Azuelos	Yvan Attal	
2013	Delicate Gravity (Short)	Paul	Philippe Andre	Palm Springs International ShortFest – Best of Festival Award
2014	Le Dernier Diamant	Simon Carrerra	Éric Barbier	
2014	Son épouse	Joseph de Rosa	Michel Spinosa	
2016	En Moi	the filmmaker	Laetitia Casta	Short film
2016	The Jews	Yvan	Yvan Attal	Also director and screenwriter
2016	Heaven Will Wait		Marie-Castille Mention-Schaar	
2017	Raid dingue	Viktor	Dany Boon	
2017	Rock'n Roll	Yvan Attal	Guillaume Canet	
2017	Le Brio	—N/a	Yvan Attal	
2018	Ad Vitam	Darius	Thomas Cailley	TV series - 6 episodes
2019	Seberg	Romain Gary	Benedict Andrews	
2019	My Dog Stupid	Henri Mohen	Yvan Attal	based on the short story of the same name from John Fante's novella West of Rome
2021	The Accusation	—N/a	Yvan Attal	based on the 2019 novel of the same name by Karine Tuil
2021	Stuck Together	Gabriel	Dany Boon	
2022	The Sitting Duck	Luc Oursel	Jean-Paul Salomé	
2023	Bardot	Raoul Lévy	Danièle Thompson and Christopher Thompson	TV series
2023	Breaking Point	Mathieu Demarsan	Yvan Attal	
2023	Of Money and Blood	Anton Zagury	Xavier Giannoli and Frederic Planchon	TV series
2024	Sur la dalle	Commissaire Jean-Baptiste Adamsberg	Josée Dayan	TV miniseries, based on the novel by Fred Vargas

== Dubbing ==
(French version)

- Tom Cruise :
  - Docteur William 'Bill' Harford : Eyes Wide Shut
  - Ethan Hunt : Mission: Impossible 2
  - David Aames : Vanilla Sky
  - John Anderton : Minority Report
- James McAvoy :
  - Penelope : Max
