= 29th César Awards =

2004 French film awards ceremony

- Date: 21 February 2004
- Site: Théâtre du Châtelet, Paris, France
- Hosted by: Gad Elmaleh

Highlights
- Best Film: The Barbarian Invasions
- Best Actor: Omar Sharif; Monsieur Ibrahim
- Best Actress: Sylvie Testud; Fear and Trembling

Television coverage
- Network: Canal+

The 29th César Awards ceremony, presented by the Académie des Arts et Techniques du Cinéma, honoured the best films of 2003 in France and took place on 21 February 2004 at the Théâtre du Châtelet in Paris. The ceremony was chaired by Fanny Ardant and hosted by Gad Elmaleh. The Barbarian Invasions won the award for Best Film.

== Winners and nominees ==
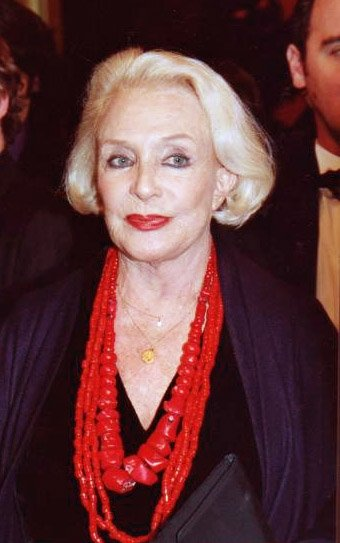
Micheline Presle, Honorary César recipient

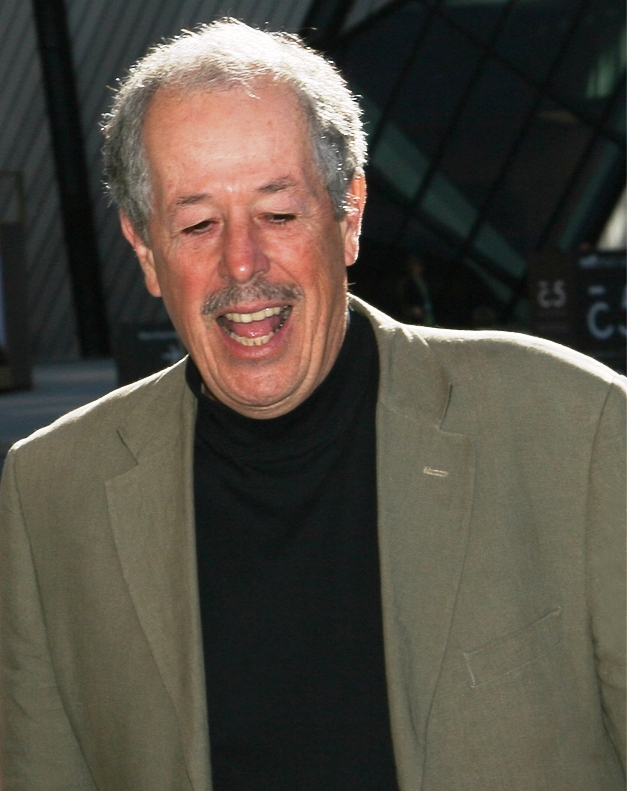
Denys Arcand, Best Film and Best Director winner

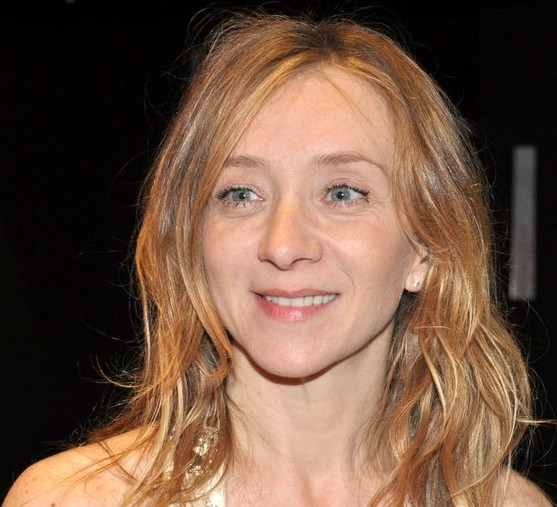
Sylvie Testud, Best Actress winner

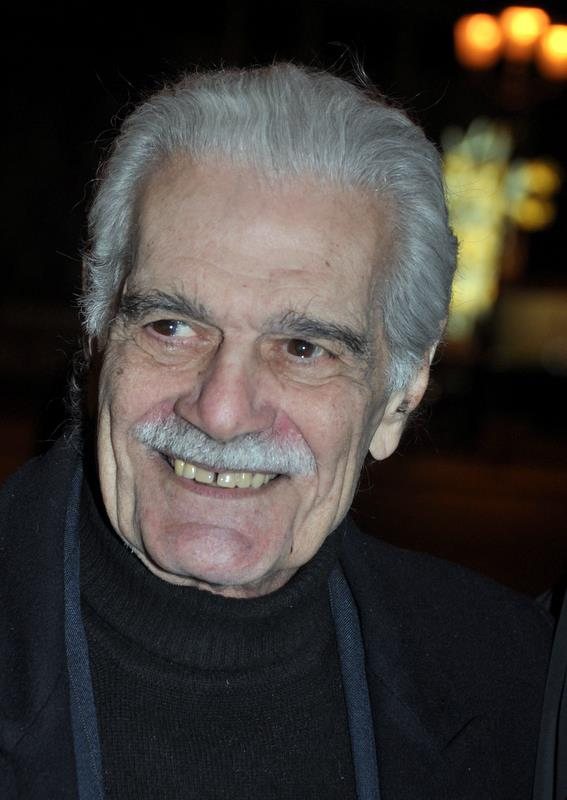
Omar Sharif, Best Actor winner

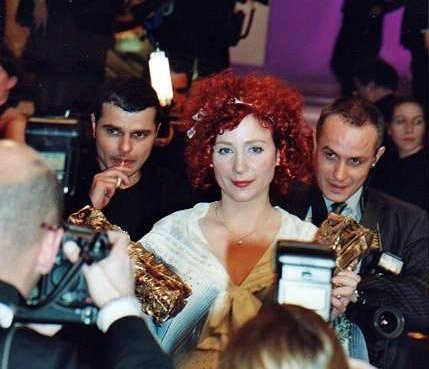
Julie Depardieu, Best Supporting Actress and Most Promising Actress winner

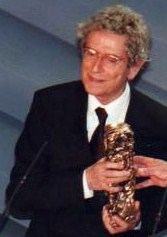
Darry Cowl, Best Supporting Actor winner

Best Film The Barbarian Invasions: Bon Voyage; Not on the Lips; Feelings; The Triplets of Belleville	Best Director Denys Arcand – The Barbarian Invasions: Jean-Paul Rappeneau – Bon Voyage; Alain Resnais – Not on the Lips; Claude Miller – Little Lili; Lucas Belvaux – Un couple épatant, Cavale and Après la vie
Best Actor Omar Sharif – Monsieur Ibrahim: Daniel Auteuil – After You...; Jean-Pierre Bacri – Feelings; Gad Elmaleh – Chouchou; Bruno Todeschini – His Brother	Best Actress Sylvie Testud – Fear and Trembling: Josiane Balasko – That Woman; Nathalie Baye – Feelings; Isabelle Carré – Feelings; Charlotte Rampling – Swimming Pool
Best Supporting Actor Darry Cowl – Not on the Lips: Yvan Attal – Bon Voyage; Clovis Cornillac – Nickel and Dime; Marc Lavoine – Le Cœur des hommes; Jean-Pierre Marielle – Little Lili	Best Supporting Actress Julie Depardieu – Little Lili: Judith Godrèche – France Boutique; Isabelle Nanty – Not on the Lips; Géraldine Pailhas – The Cost of Living; Ludivine Sagnier – Swimming Pool
Most Promising Actor Grégori Derangère– Bon Voyage: Nicolas Duvauchelle – Eager Bodies; Pascal Elbé – Father and Sons; Grégoire Leprince-Ringuet – Strayed; Gaspard Ulliel – Strayed	Most Promising Actress Julie Depardieu – Little Lili: Marie-Josée Croze – The Barbarian Invasions; Dinara Drukarova – Since Otar Left; Sophie Quinton – Who Killed Bambi?; Laura Smet – Eager Bodies
Best Original Screenplay or Adaptation The Barbarian Invasions – Denys Arcand: Bon Voyage – Jean-Paul Rappeneau and Patrick Modiano; Since Otar Left – Julie Bertuccelli, Roger Bohbot and Bernard Renucci; Fear and Trembling – Alain Corneau; Un couple épatant, Cavale and Après la vie – Lucas Belvaux	Best Film from the European Union Good Bye, Lenin!: Dogville; The Best of Youth; Respiro; The Magdalene Sisters
Best First Feature Film Since Otar Left: It's Easier for a Camel...; Father and Sons; Who Killed Bambi?; The Triplets of Belleville	Best Cinematography Thierry Arbogast – Bon Voyage: Agnès Godard – Strayed; Pierre Aïm – Monsieur N.
Best Editing Danielle Anezin, Valérie Loiseleux and Ludo Troch – Un couple épatant, Cavale and Après la vie: Maryline Monthieux – Bon Voyage; Hervé de Luze – Not on the Lips	Best Sound Jean-Marie Blondel, Gérard Hardy and Gérard Lamps – Not on the Lips: Pierre Gamet, Jean Goudier and Dominique Hennequin – Bon Voyage; Olivier Goinard, Jean-Pierre Laforce and Jean-Paul Mugel – Strayed
Best Original Music Benoît Charest – The Triplets of Belleville: Gabriel Yared – Bon Voyage; Stephan Eicher – Monsieur N.; Bruno Fontaine – Not on the Lips	Best Costume Design Jackie Stephens Budin – Not on the Lips: Catherine Leterrier – Bon Voyage; Carine Sarfati – Monsieur N.
Best Production Design Catherine Leterrier and Jacques Rouxel – Bon Voyage: Patrick Durand – Monsieur N.; Jacques Saulnier – Not on the Lips	Best Short Film L'Homme sans tête: La Chatte andalouse; J'attendrai le suivant; Pacotille
Best Foreign Film Mystic River: Elephant; Gangs of New York; The Return; The Hours
Honorary César Micheline Presle

== See also ==
- 76th Academy Awards
- 57th British Academy Film Awards
- 16th European Film Awards
- 9th Lumière Awards
