= César Award for Best Director =

French film award

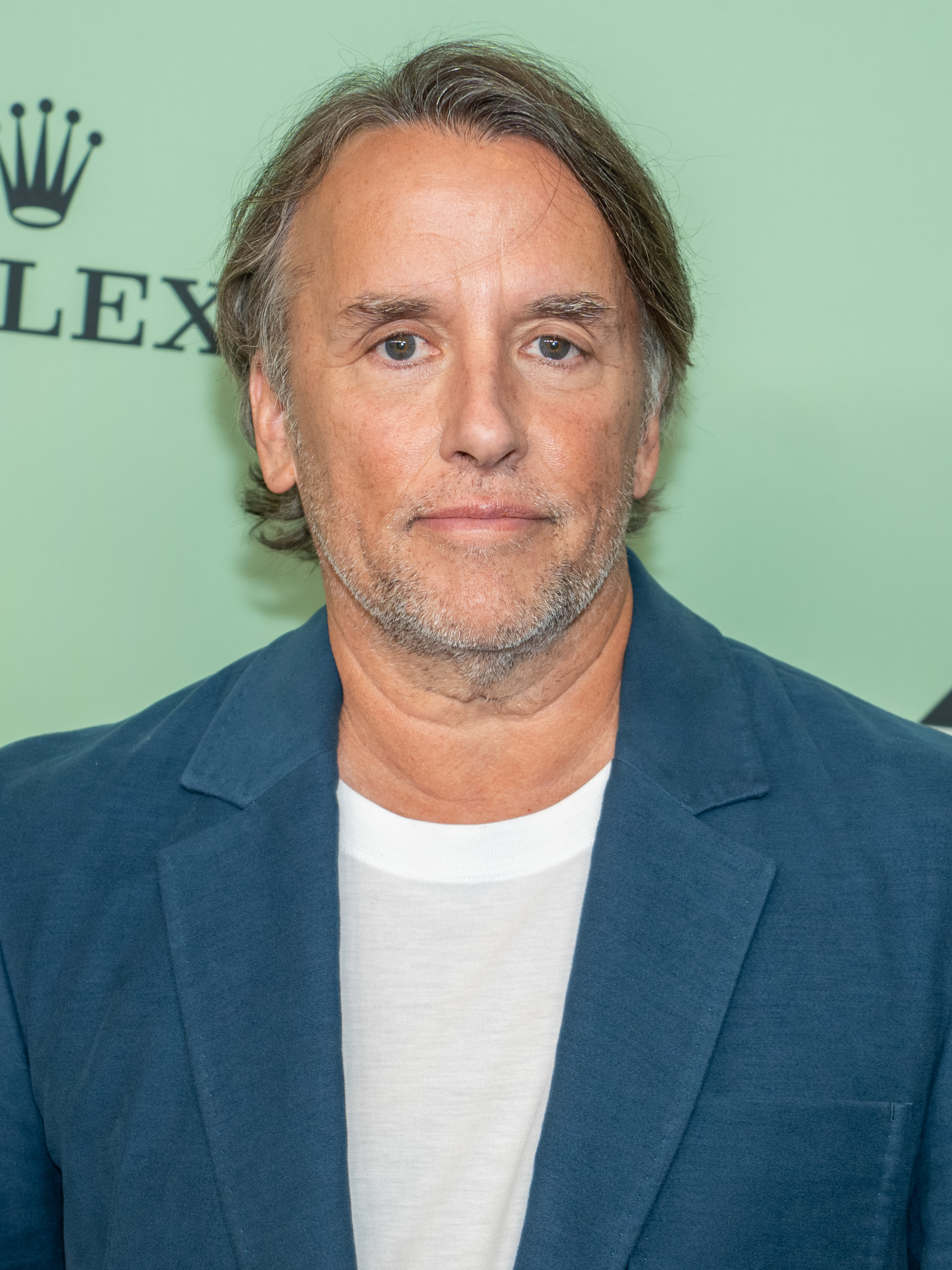
- 2026 recipient: Richard Linklater
- Country: France
- Presented by: Académie des Arts et Techniques du Cinéma
- First award: 1976
- Currently held by: Richard Linklater for Nouvelle Vague (2026)
- Website: academie-cinema.org

The César Award for Best Director (French: César de la meilleure réalisation) is an award presented annually by the Académie des Lumières since 1976. It was presented as the César du meilleur réalisateur from 1976 to 2015.

== History ==
=== Superlatives ===
Superlative	Men		Women	
Most awards	Roman Polanski	5	Tonie Marshall; Justine Triet	1
Most nominations	Alain Resnais	8	Nicole Garcia & Maïwenn	3
Most nominations without winning	Claude Miller	7	Nicole Garcia & Maïwenn	3
Oldest winner	Roman Polanski	86	Tonie Marshall	48
Oldest nominee	Alain Resnais	84	Agnès Varda	57
Youngest winner	Xavier Dolan	27	Justine Triet	45
Youngest nominee	Luc Besson	26	Maïwenn	35

== Winners and nominees ==
=== 1970s ===
Year	Winner and nominees	English title	Original title
1976 (1st)	Bertrand Tavernier	Let Joy Reign Supreme	Que la fête commence...
1976 (1st)	Robert Enrico	The Old Gun	Le Vieux Fusil
1976 (1st)	Jean-Paul Rappeneau	Call me Savage	Le Sauvage
1976 (1st)	François Truffaut	The Story of Adele H.	L'Histoire d'Adèle H.
1977 (2nd)	Joseph Losey	Mr. Klein	Monsieur Klein
1977 (2nd)	Claude Miller	The Best Way to Walk	La Meilleure Façon de marcher
1977 (2nd)	Bertrand Tavernier	The Judge and the Assassin	Le Juge et l'assassin
1977 (2nd)	André Téchiné	Barocco	
1978 (3rd)	Alain Resnais	Providence	
1978 (3rd)	Luis Buñuel	That Obscure Object of Desire	Cet obscur objet du désir
1978 (3rd)	Claude Miller	This Sweet Sickness	Dites-lui que je l'aime
1978 (3rd)	Pierre Schoendoerffer	Drummer-Crab	Le Crabe-Tambour
1979 (4th)	Christian de Chalonge	Other People's Money	L'Argent des autres
1979 (4th)	Michel Deville	Dossier 51	Le Dossier 51
1979 (4th)	Ariane Mnouchkine	Molière	
1979 (4th)	Claude Sautet	A Simple Story	Une histoire simple

=== 1980s ===
Year	Winners and nominees	English title	Original title
1980 (5th)	Roman Polanski (nominated for the Academy Award)	Tess	
1980 (5th)	Costa Gavras	Womanlight	Clair de femme
1980 (5th)	Joseph Losey	Don Giovanni	
1980 (5th)	Jacques Doillon	The Hussy	La Drôlesse
1981 (6th)	François Truffaut	The Last Metro	Le dernier métro
1981 (6th)	Jean-Luc Godard	Slow Motion (a.k.a. Every Man for Himself)	Sauve qui peut (la vie)
1981 (6th)	Alain Resnais	My American Uncle	Mon oncle d'Amérique
1981 (6th)	Claude Sautet	A Bad Son	Un mauvais fils
1982 (7th)	Jean-Jacques Annaud	Quest for Fire	La Guerre du feu
1982 (7th)	Pierre Granier-Deferre	Strange Affair	Une étrange affaire
1982 (7th)	Claude Miller	Under Suspicion	Garde à vue
1982 (7th)	Bertrand Tavernier	Clean Up (a.k.a. Clean Slate)	Coup de torchon
1983 (8th)	Andrzej Wajda	Danton	
1983 (8th)	Jacques Demy	A Room in Town	Une chambre en ville
1983 (8th)	Jean-Luc Godard	Passion	
1983 (8th)	Bob Swaim	The Balance	La Balance
1984 (9th)	Ettore Scola	The Ball	Le Bal
1984 (9th)	Claude Berri	So Long, Stooge	Tchao pantin
1984 (9th)	Jean Becker	One Deadly Summer	L'Été meurtrier
1984 (9th)	Maurice Pialat	To Our Loves	À nos amours
1984 (9th)	François Truffaut	Finally, Sunday	Vivement dimanche!
1985 (10th)	Claude Zidi	My New Partner	Les Ripoux
1985 (10th)	Alain Resnais	Love Unto Death	L'Amour à mort
1985 (10th)	Éric Rohmer	Full Moon in Paris	Les Nuits de la pleine lune
1985 (10th)	Francesco Rosi	Carmen	
1985 (10th)	Bertrand Tavernier	A Sunday in the Country	Un dimanche à la campagne
1986 (11th)	Michel Deville	Death in a French Garden	Péril en la demeure
1986 (11th)	Luc Besson	Subway	
1986 (11th)	Claude Miller	Impudent Girl	L'Effrontée
1986 (11th)	Coline Serreau	Three Men and a Cradle	Trois hommes et un couffin
1986 (11th)	Agnès Varda	Vagabond	Sans toit ni loi
1987 (12th)	Alain Cavalier	Thérèse	
1987 (12th)	Jean-Jacques Beineix	Betty Blue	37°2 le matin
1987 (12th)	Claude Berri	Jean de Florette	
1987 (12th)	Bertrand Blier	Ménage	Tenue de soirée
1987 (12th)	Alain Resnais	Mélo	
1988 (13th)	Louis Malle	Goodbye, Children	Au revoir les enfants
1988 (13th)	Jean-Loup Hubert	The Grand Highway	Le Grand Chemin
1988 (13th)	Patrice Leconte	Tandem	
1988 (13th)	Maurice Pialat	Under the Sun of Satan	Sous le soleil de Satan
1988 (13th)	André Téchiné	The Innocents	Les Innocents
1989 (14th)	Jean-Jacques Annaud	The Bear	L'Ours
1989 (14th)	Luc Besson	The Big Blue	Le Grand Bleu
1989 (14th)	Claude Chabrol	Story of Women	Une affaire de femmes
1989 (14th)	Michel Deville	The Reader	La Lectrice
1989 (14th)	Claude Miller	The Little Thief	La Petite Voleuse

=== 1990s ===
Year	Winners and nominees	English title	Original title
1990 (15th)	Bertrand Blier	Too Beautiful for You	Trop belle pour toi
1990 (15th)	Alain Corneau	Indian Nocturne	Nocturne indien
1990 (15th)	Miloš Forman	Valmont	
1990 (15th)	Patrice Leconte	Mr. Hire	Monsieur Hire
1990 (15th)	Bertrand Tavernier	Life and Nothing But	La Vie et rien d'autre
1991 (16th)	Jean-Paul Rappeneau	Cyrano de Bergerac	
1991 (16th)	Claude Berri	Uranus	
1991 (16th)	Luc Besson	La Femme Nikita	Nikita
1991 (16th)	Jacques Doillon	The Little Gangster	Le Petit Criminel
1991 (16th)	Patrice Leconte	The Hairdresser's Husband	Le Mari de la coiffeuse
1992 (17th)	Alain Corneau	All the Mornings of the World	Tous les matins du monde
1992 (17th)	Bertrand Blier	Thank You Life	Merci la vie
1992 (17th)	Maurice Pialat	Van Gogh	
1992 (17th)	Jacques Rivette	The Beautiful Troublemaker	La Belle Noiseuse
1992 (17th)	André Téchiné	I Don't Kiss	J'embrasse pas
1993 (18th)	Claude Sautet	A Heart in Winter	Un cœur en hiver
1993 (18th)	Cyril Collard	Savage Nights	Les Nuits fauves
1993 (18th)	Christine Pascal	And the Little Prince Said	Le Petit Prince a dit
1993 (18th)	Bertrand Tavernier	L.627	
1993 (18th)	Régis Wargnier	Indochine	
1994 (19th)	Alain Resnais	Smoking/No Smoking	
1994 (19th)	Claude Berri	Germinal	
1994 (19th)	Bertrand Blier	1, 2, 3, Sun	Un, deux, trois, soleil
1994 (19th)	Krzysztof Kieślowski	Three Colours: Blue	Trois couleurs: Bleu
1994 (19th)	Jean-Marie Poiré	The Visitors	Les Visiteurs
1994 (19th)	André Téchiné	My Favourite Season	Ma saison préférée
1995 (20th)	André Téchiné	Wild Reeds	Les Roseaux sauvages
1995 (20th)	Luc Besson	Léon	
1995 (20th)	Patrice Chéreau	Queen Margot	La Reine Margot
1995 (20th)	Nicole Garcia	The Favourite Son	Le Fils préféré
1995 (20th)	Krzysztof Kieślowski (nominated for the Academy Award)	Three Colours: Red	Trois couleurs: Rouge
1996 (21st)	Claude Sautet	Nelly and Mr. Arnaud	Nelly et Monsieur Arnaud
1996 (21st)	Étienne Chatiliez	Happiness Is in the Field	Le Bonheur est dans le pré
1996 (21st)	Claude Chabrol	The Ceremony	La Cérémonie
1996 (21st)	Josiane Balasko	French Twist	Gazon maudit
1996 (21st)	Mathieu Kassovitz	Hate	La Haine
1996 (21st)	Jean-Paul Rappeneau	The Horseman on the Roof	Le Hussard sur le toit
1997 (22nd)	Patrice Leconte	Ridicule	
1997 (22nd)	Bertrand Tavernier	Capitaine Conan	Capitaine Conan
1997 (22nd)	Jacques Audiard	A Self Made Hero	Un héros très discret
1997 (22nd)	Cédric Klapisch	Family Resemblances	Un air de famille
1997 (22nd)	André Téchiné	Thieves	Les Voleurs
1998 (23rd)	Luc Besson	The Fifth Element	
1998 (23rd)	Alain Corneau	The Cousin	Le Cousin
1998 (23rd)	Robert Guédiguian	Marius and Jeannette	Marius et Jeannette
1998 (23rd)	Manuel Poirier	Western	
1998 (23rd)	Alain Resnais	Same Old Song	On connaît la chanson
1999 (24th)	Patrice Chéreau	Those Who Love Me Can Take the Train	Ceux qui m'aiment prendront le train
1999 (24th)	Nicole Garcia	Place Vendôme	
1999 (24th)	Gérard Pirès	Taxi	
1999 (24th)	Francis Veber	The Dinner Game	Le Dîner de cons
1999 (24th)	Erick Zonca	The Dreamlife of Angels	La Vie rêvée des anges

=== 2000s ===
Year	Winner and nominees	English title	Original title
2000 (25th)	Tonie Marshall	Venus Beauty Institute	Vénus Beauté (Institut)
2000 (25th)	Jean Becker	The Children of the Marshland	Les Enfants du marais
2000 (25th)	Luc Besson	The Messenger: The Story of Joan of Arc	
2000 (25th)	Michel Deville	Sachs' Disease	La Maladie de Sachs
2000 (25th)	Patrice Leconte	Girl on the Bridge	La Fille sur le pont
2000 (25th)	Régis Wargnier	East/West	Est–Ouest
2001 (26th)	Dominik Moll	Harry, He's Here to Help	Harry, un ami qui vous veut du bien
2001 (26th)	Jean-Pierre Denis	Murderous Maids	Les Blessures assassines
2001 (26th)	Agnès Jaoui	The Taste of Others	Le Goût des autres
2001 (26th)	Mathieu Kassovitz	The Crimson Rivers	Les Rivières pourpres
2001 (26th)	Patricia Mazuy	Saint-Cyr	
2002 (27th)	Jean-Pierre Jeunet	Amélie	Le Fabuleux Destin d'Amélie Poulain
2002 (27th)	Jacques Audiard	Read My Lips	Sur mes lèvres
2002 (27th)	François Dupeyron	The Officers' Ward	La Chambre des officiers
2002 (27th)	Patrice Chéreau	Intimacy	
2002 (27th)	François Ozon	Under the Sand	Sous le sable
2003 (28th)	Roman Polanski (won the Academy Award)	The Pianist	
2003 (28th)	Costa Gavras	Amen.	
2003 (28th)	Cédric Klapisch	The Spanish Apartement (a.k.a. Pot Luck)	L'Auberge espagnole
2003 (28th)	Nicolas Philibert	To Be and to Have	Être et avoir
2003 (28th)	François Ozon	8 Women	8 femmes
2004 (29th)	Denys Arcand	The Barbarian Invasions	Les Invasions barbares
2004 (29th)	Lucas Belvaux	One: On the Run; Two: An Amazing Couple; Three: After Life	Cavale; Un couple épatant Après la vie
2004 (29th)	Claude Miller	Little Lili	La Petite Lili
2004 (29th)	Jean-Paul Rappeneau	Bon voyage	
2004 (29th)	Alain Resnais	Not on the Lips	Pas sur la bouche
2005 (30th)	Abdellatif Kechiche	Games of Love and Chance	L'Esquive
2005 (30th)	Christophe Barratier	The Chorus	Les Choristes
2005 (30th)	Arnaud Desplechin	Kings and Queen	Rois et reine
2005 (30th)	Jean-Pierre Jeunet	A Very Long Engagement	Un long dimanche de fiançailles
2005 (30th)	Olivier Marchal	Département 36	36 Quai des Orfèvres
2006 (31st)	Jacques Audiard	The Beat That My Heart Skipped	De battre mon cœur s'est arrêté
2006 (31st)	Xavier Beauvois	The Young Lieutenant	Le Petit Lieutenant
2006 (31st)	Jean-Pierre and Luc Dardenne	The Child	L'Enfant
2006 (31st)	Michael Haneke	Hidden	Caché
2006 (31st)	Radu Mihaileanu	Live and Become	Va, vis et deviens
2007 (32nd)	Guillaume Canet	Tell No One	Ne le dis à personne
2007 (32nd)	Rachid Bouchareb	Days of Glory	Indigènes
2007 (32nd)	Pascale Ferran	Lady Chatterley	
2007 (32nd)	Philippe Lioret	Don't Worry, I'm Fine	Je vais bien, ne t'en fais pas
2007 (32nd)	Alain Resnais	Private Fears in Public Places	Cœurs
2008 (33rd)	Abdellatif Kechiche	The Secret of the Grain	La Graine et la mulet
2008 (33rd)	Olivier Dahan	La Vie en Rose	La môme
2008 (33rd)	Claude Miller	A Secret	Un secret
2008 (33rd)	Julian Schnabel (nominated for the Academy Award)	The Diving Bell and the Butterfly	Le Scaphandre et le papillon
2008 (33rd)	André Téchiné	The Witnesses	Les Témoins
2009 (34th)	Jean-François Richet	Public Enemy Number One: Part 1 and 2	L'Instinct de mort and L'Ennemi public n°1
2009 (34th)	Rémi Bezançon	The First Day of the Rest of Your Life	Le Premier Jour du reste de ta vie
2009 (34th)	Laurent Cantet	The Class	Entre les murs
2009 (34th)	Arnaud Desplechin	A Christmas Tale	Un conte de Noël
2009 (34th)	Martin Provost	Séraphine	
2010 (35th)	Jacques Audiard	A Prophet	Un prophète
2010 (35th)	Lucas Belvaux	Rapt!	Rapt!
2010 (35th)	Xavier Giannoli	In the Beginning	À l'origine
2010 (35th)	Philippe Lioret	Welcome	Welcome
2010 (35th)	Radu Mihaileanu	The Concert	Le Concert

=== 2010s ===
Year	Winner and nominees	English title	Original title
2011 (36th)	Roman Polanski	The Ghost Writer	
2011 (36th)	Mathieu Amalric	On Tour	Tournée
2011 (36th)	Olivier Assayas	Carlos	
2011 (36th)	Xavier Beauvois	Of Gods and Men	Des hommes et des dieux
2011 (36th)	Bertrand Blier	The Clink of Ice	Le Bruit des glaçons
2012 (37th)	Michel Hazanavicius (won the Academy Award)	The Artist	
2012 (37th)	Valérie Donzelli	Declaration of War	La Guerre est déclarée
2012 (37th)	Aki Kaurismäki	Le Havre	
2012 (37th)	Maïwenn	Polisse	
2012 (37th)	Pierre Scholler	The Minister	L'Exercice de l'État
2012 (37th)	Éric Toledano and Olivier Nakache	The Intouchables	Intouchables
2013 (38th)	Michael Haneke (nominated for the Academy Award)	Amour	
2013 (38th)	Jacques Audiard	Rust and Bone	De rouille et d'os
2013 (38th)	Stéphane Brizé	A Few Hours of Spring	Quelques heures de printemps
2013 (38th)	Leos Carax	Holy Motors	
2013 (38th)	Benoît Jacquot	Farewell, My Queen	Les Adieux à la reine
2013 (38th)	Noémie Lvovsky	Camille Rewinds	Camille redouble
2013 (38th)	François Ozon	In the House	Dans la maison
2014 (39th)	Roman Polanski	Venus in Fur	La Vénus à la fourrure
2014 (39th)	Arnaud Desplechin	Jimmy P.	
2014 (39th)	Albert Dupontel	9 Month Stretch	Neuf mois ferme
2014 (39th)	Asghar Farhadi	The Past	Le Passé
2014 (39th)	Guillaume Gallienne	Me, Myself and Mum	Les Garçons et Guillaume, à table !
2014 (39th)	Alain Guiraudie	Stranger by the Lake	L'Inconnu du lac
2014 (39th)	Abdellatif Kechiche	Blue Is the Warmest Colour	La Vie d'Adèle – Chapitres 1 & 2
2015 (40th)	Abderrahmane Sissako	Timbuktu	
2015 (40th)	Céline Sciamma	Girlhood	Bande de filles
2015 (40th)	Thomas Cailley	Love at First Fight	Les Combattants
2015 (40th)	Robin Campillo	Eastern Boys	
2015 (40th)	Thomas Lilti	Hippocrates	Hippocrate
2015 (40th)	Bertrand Bonello	Saint Laurent	
2015 (40th)	Olivier Assayas	Clouds of Sils Maria	Sils Maria
2016 (41st)	Arnaud Desplechin	My Golden Days	Trois souvenirs de ma jeunesse
2016 (41st)	Jacques Audiard	Dheepan	
2016 (41st)	Stéphane Brizé	The Measure of a Man	La Loi du marché
2016 (41st)	Xavier Giannoli	Marguerite	
2016 (41st)	Maïwenn	Mon roi	
2016 (41st)	Deniz Gamze Ergüven	Mustang	
2016 (41st)	Emmanuelle Bercot	Standing Tall	La Tête haute
2017 (42nd)	Xavier Dolan	It's Only the End of the World	Juste la fin du monde
2017 (42nd)	Houda Benyamina	Divines	
2017 (42nd)	Paul Verhoeven	Elle	
2017 (42nd)	François Ozon	Frantz	
2017 (42nd)	Anne Fontaine	The Innocents	Les Innocentes
2017 (42nd)	Bruno Dumont	Slack Bay	La Loute
2017 (42nd)	Nicole Garcia	From the Land of the Moon	Mal de pierres
2018 (43rd)	Albert Dupontel	See You Up There	Au revoir là-haut
2018 (43rd)	Robin Campillo	BPM (Beats per Minute)	120 Battements par minute
2018 (43rd)	Mathieu Amalric	Barbara	
2018 (43rd)	Julia Ducournau	Raw	Grave
2018 (43rd)	Hubert Charuel	Bloody Milk	Petit Paysan
2018 (43rd)	Michel Hazanavicius	Redoubtable	Le Redoutable
2018 (43rd)	Éric Toledano and Olivier Nakache	C'est la vie!	Le Sens de la fête
2019 (44th)	Jacques Audiard	The Sisters Brothers	Les Frères Sisters
2019 (44th)	Emmanuel Finkiel	Memoir of War	La Douleur
2019 (44th)	Pierre Salvadori	The Trouble with You	En liberté !
2019 (44th)	Gilles Lellouche	Sink or Swim	Le Grand Bain
2019 (44th)	Alex Lutz	Guy	
2019 (44th)	Xavier Legrand	Custody	Jusqu'à la garde
2019 (44th)	Jeanne Herry	In Safe Hands	Pupille

=== 2020s ===
Year	Winner and nominees	English title	Original title
2020 (45th)	Roman Polanski	An Officer and a Spy	J'accuse
2020 (45th)	Nicolas Bedos	La Belle Époque	
2020 (45th)	François Ozon	By the Grace of God	Grâce à Dieu
2020 (45th)	Éric Toledano and Olivier Nakache	The Specials	Hors normes
2020 (45th)	Ladj Ly	Les Misérables	
2020 (45th)	Céline Sciamma	Portrait of a Lady on Fire	Portrait de la jeune fille en feu
2020 (45th)	Arnaud Desplechin	Oh Mercy!	Roubaix, une lumière
2021 (46th)	Albert Dupontel	Bye Bye Morons	Adieu les cons
2021 (46th)	Maïwenn	DNA	ADN
2021 (46th)	Sébastien Lifshitz	Adolescents	Adolescentes
2021 (46th)	Emmanuel Mouret	Love Affair(s)	Les Choses qu'on dit, les choses qu'on fait
2021 (46th)	François Ozon	Summer of 85	Été 85
2022 (47th)	Leos Carax	Annette	
2022 (47th)	Audrey Diwan	Happening	L'Événement
2022 (47th)	Julia Ducournau	Titane	
2022 (47th)	Xavier Giannoli	Lost Illusions	Illusions perdues
2022 (47th)	Arthur Harari	Onoda: 10,000 Nights in the Jungle	Onoda, 10 000 nuits dans la jungle
2022 (47th)	Cédric Jimenez	The Stronghold	BAC Nord
2022 (47th)	Valérie Lemercier	Aline	
2023 (48th)	Dominik Moll	The Night of the 12th	La Nuit du 12
2023 (48th)	Louis Garrel	The Innocent	L'Innocent
2023 (48th)	Cédric Jimenez	November	Novembre
2023 (48th)	Cedric Klapisch	Rise	En corps
2023 (48th)	Albert Serra	Pacifiction	Pacifiction: Tourment sur les Îles
2024 (49th)	Justine Triet (nominated for the Academy Award)	Anatomy of a Fall	Anatomie d'une chute
2024 (49th)	Catherine Breillat	Last Summer	L'Été dernier
2024 (49th)	Thomas Cailley	The Animal Kingdom	Le Règne animal
2024 (49th)	Jeanne Herry	All Your Faces	Je verrai toujours vos visages
2024 (49th)	Cédric Kahn	The Goldman Case	Le Procès Goldman
2025 (50th)	Jacques Audiard (nominated for the Academy Award)	Emilia Pérez	
2025 (50th)	Matthieu Delaporte and Alexandre de La Patellière	The Count of Monte Cristo	Le Comte de Monte-Cristo
2025 (50th)	Alain Guiraudie	Misericordia	Miséricorde
2025 (50th)	Gilles Lellouche	Beating Hearts	L'Amour ouf
2025 (50th)	Boris Lojkine	Souleymane's Story	L'Histoire de Souleymane
2026 (51st)	Richard Linklater	Nouvelle Vague	
2026 (51st)	Carine Tardieu	The Ties That Bind Us	L'Attachement
2026 (51st)	Dominik Moll	Case 137	Dossier 137
2026 (51st)	Hafsia Herzi	The Little Sister	La Petite Dernière
2026 (51st)	Stéphane Demoustier	The Great Arch	L'Inconnu de la Grande Arche

== Multiple wins and nominations ==
The following individuals received two or more Best Director awards:

Wins	Director
5	Roman Polanski
4	Jacques Audiard
2	Jean-Jacques Annaud
2	Albert Dupontel
2	Abdellatif Kechiche
2	Dominik Moll
2	Alain Resnais
2	Claude Sautet
2	Bertrand Tavernier

The following individuals received three or more Best Director nominations:

Nominations	Director
8	Jacques Audiard
8	Alain Resnais
7	Claude Miller
7	Bertrand Tavernier
7	André Téchiné
6	Luc Besson
6	François Ozon
5	Bertrand Blier
5	Arnaud Desplechin
5	Patrice Leconte
5	Roman Polanski
4	Claude Berri
4	Michel Deville
4	Jean-Paul Rappeneau
4	Claude Sautet
3	Patrice Chéreau
3	Alain Corneau
3	Albert Dupontel
3	Nicole Garcia
3	Xavier Giannoli
3	Abdellatif Kechiche
3	Cedric Klapisch
3	Maïwenn
3	Olivier Nakache & Éric Toledano
3	Maurice Pialat
3	François Truffaut

== See also ==
- Lumière Award for Best Director
- Magritte Award for Best Director
- European Film Award for Best Director
- Academy Award for Best Director
- BAFTA Award for Best Direction
