= List of French films of 2003 =

A list of films produced in France in 2003.

Title	Director	Cast	Genre	Notes
18 Years Later	Coline Serreau	André Dussollier, Michel Boujenah, Roland Giraud	Comedy	
Anything Else	Woody Allen	Woody Allen, Jason Biggs, Stockard Channing, Danny DeVito, Jimmy Fallon, Christina Ricci	Romantic / Comedy	
Apres Vous (After You)	Pierre Salvadori	Daniel Auteuil, José Garcia, Sandrine Kiberlain	Comedy / Romance	4 win & 8 nominations
Bon Voyage	Jean-Paul Rappeneau	Isabelle Adjani, Gérard Depardieu, Peter Coyote	Comedy / Drama	1 win & 1 nomination
Cavale	Lucas Belvaux	Lucas Belvaux, Ornella Muti	Thriller	1st of a trilogy
Fear and Trembling	Alain Corneau	Sylvie Testud	Comedy	3 wins & 2 nominations
Games of Love and Chance	Abdellatif Kechiche	Osman Elkharraz, Sara Forestier	Drama	13 wins & +2 nominations
Haute Tension	Alexandre Aja	Cécile de France	Crime / Horror	4 wins & 3 nominations
It's Easier for a Camel...	Valeria Bruni Tedeschi	Chiara Mastroianni, Jean-Hugues Anglade	Comedy	Entered into the 25th Moscow International Film Festival
Jeux d'enfants	Yann Samuell	Guillaume Canet, Marion Cotillard	Comedy / Drama / Romance	3 wins & 2 nominations
Kaena: The Prophecy	Chris Delaporte, Pascal Pinon		CG Animation	1 win & 1 nomination
Les Côtelettes	Bertrand Blier	Philippe Noiret, Michel Bouquet	Drama	Entered into the 2003 Cannes Film Festival
Little Lili	Claude Miller	Nicole Garcia, Bernard Giraudeau		Entered into the 2003 Cannes Film Festival
Monsieur Ibrahim	François Dupeyron	Omar Sharif	Drama	Nomin. for Golden Globe, +4 wins, +4 nom.
Monsieur N.	Antoine de Caunes	Philippe Torreton	Biography / Drama	4 nominations
Nathalie...	Anne Fontaine	Fanny Ardant, Emmanuelle Béart	Drama	2 nominations
Pas sur la bouche	Alain Resnais	Sabine Azéma, Isabelle Nanty	Musical	
Playing 'In the Company of Men'	Arnaud Desplechin	Sami Bouajila	Drama	Screened at the 2003 Cannes Film Festival
Remake	Dino Mustafić	François Berléand, Évelyne Bouix	Drama/History/War	Entered into the Cannes Film Festival, Venice Film Festival, Berlin International Film Festival, International Film Festival Rotterdam, Karlovy Vary International Film Festival; Special Mention Award at the 53rd Berlin International Film Festival; 5 wins & 4 nominations
Sole Sisters	Pierre Jolivet	Sandrine Kiberlain	Comedy	
The Story of Marie and Julien	Jacques Rivette	Emmanuelle Béart, Jerzy Radziwiłowicz, Anne Brochet	Drama, Romance, Mystery	Shown in competition at the 2003 San International Film Festival
Swimming Pool	François Ozon	Charlotte Rampling	Drama / Mystery	2 wins & 11 nominations
Tais-toi!	Francis Veber	Gérard Depardieu, Jean Reno	Comedy / Crime	
Taxi 3	Gérard Krawczyk	Samy Naceri	Action / Comedy	
That Day	Raúl Ruiz	Bernard Giraudeau	Comedy	Entered into the 2003 Cannes Film Festival
Tiresia	Bertrand Bonello	Laurent Lucas, Clara Choveaux	Drama	1 nomination
The Triplets of Belleville (Les Triplettes de Belleville)	Sylvain Chomet		Animation	Nominated for 2 Oscars, +15 wins, +18 nom.
Twentynine Palms	Bruno Dumont	Yekaterina Golubeva, David Wissak	Drama / Horror	2 nominations
Who Killed Bambi?	Gilles Marchand	Sophie Quinton, Laurent Lucas	Thriller	Screened at the 2003 Cannes Film Festival
