= French Syndicate of Cinema Critics =

Annual film awards in France

The French Syndicate of Cinema Critics (French: Syndicat français de la critique de cinéma et des films de télévision) has, each year since 1946, awarded a prize ("Prix de la critique", English: "Critics Prize"), the Prix Méliès, to the best French film of the preceding year. More awards have been added over time: the Prix Léon Moussinac for the best foreign film, added in 1967; the Prix Novaïs-Texeira for the best short film, added in 1999; prizes for the best first French and best first foreign films, added in 2001 and 2014, respectively; etc.

Each year, the Syndicate also organizes the Critics' Week, which is the oldest parallel competitive section of the Cannes Film Festival.

== Best French Film ==
=== 1940s ===
- 1946: La Bataille du rail by René Clément
- 1947: Le Silence est d'or by René Clair
- 1948: Paris 1900 by Nicole Védrès
- 1949: Manon by Henri-Georges Clouzot

=== 1950s ===
- 1950: Rendezvous in July (Rendez-vous de juillet) by Jacques Becker
- 1951: Diary of a Country Priest (Journal d'un curé de campagne) by Robert Bresson
- 1952: Les Belles de nuit by René Clair
- 1953: The Wages of Fear (Le salaire de la peur) by Henri-Georges Clouzot
- 1954: The Red and the Black (Le rouge et le noir) by Claude Autant-Lara
- 1955: Rififi by Jules Dassin
- 1956: The Silent World (Le monde du silence) by Jacques-Yves Cousteau and Les Grandes Manœuvres by René Clair
- 1957: La Traversée de Paris by Claude Autant-Lara and A Man Escaped by Robert Bresson
- 1958: Mon Oncle by Jacques Tati
- 1959: Hiroshima mon amour by Alain Resnais and The 400 Blows by François Truffaut

=== 1960s ===
- 1960: Le Trou by Jacques Becker and A bout de souffle by Jean-Luc Godard
- 1961: Last Year at Marienbad by Alain Resnais
- 1962: Cléo from 5 to 7 (Cléo de 5 à 7) by Agnès Varda
- 1963: The Trial by Orson Welles
- 1964: The Umbrellas of Cherbourg (Les parapluies de Cherbourg) by Jacques Demy
- 1965: The Shameless Old Lady (La vieille dame indigne) by René Allio
- 1966: The War Is Over (La guerre est finie) by Alain Resnais and Au hasard Balthazar by Robert Bresson
- 1967: Belle de Jour by Luis Buñuel and Mouchette by Robert Bresson
- 1968: Stolen Kisses (Baisers volés) by François Truffaut
- 1969: My Night at Maud's (Ma nuit chez Maud) by Éric Rohmer

=== 1970s ===
- 1970: The Wild Child (L'enfant sauvage) by François Truffaut
- 1971: Claire's Knee (Le genou de Claire) by Éric Rohmer
- 1972: The Discreet Charm of the Bourgeoisie (Le charme discret de la bourgeoisie) by Luis Buñuel
- 1973: Day for Night (La nuit américaine) by François Truffaut
- 1974: Lacombe Lucien by Louis Malle
- 1975: Let Joy Reign Supreme (Que la fête commence) by Bertrand Tavernier
- 1976: The Story of Adele H. (L'histoire de Adèle H.) by François Truffaut
- 1977: Providence by Alain Resnais
- 1978: Le dossier 51 by Michel Deville
- 1979: Perceval le Gallois by Éric Rohmer

=== 1980s ===
- 1980: My American Uncle (Mon oncle d'Amérique) by Alain Resnais
- 1981: Coup de Torchon by Bertrand Tavernier and Garde à Vue by Claude Miller
- 1982: A Room in Town (Une chambre en ville) by Jacques Demy
- 1983: Pauline at the Beach (Pauline à la plage) by Éric Rohmer
- 1984: Full Moon in Paris (Les nuits de la pleine lune) by Éric Rohmer
- 1985: Death in a French Garden (Péril en la demeure) à by Michel Deville and Sans toit ni loi by Agnès Varda
- 1986: Thérèse by Alain Cavalier
- 1987: Goodbye, Children (Au revoir les enfants) by Louis Malle
- 1988: The Little Thief (La petite voleuse) by Claude Miller
- 1989: Mr. Hire (Monsieur Hire) by Patrice Leconte

=== 1990s ===
- 1990: La Discrète by Christian Vincent
- 1991: The Beautiful Troublemake (La belle noiseuse) by Jacques Rivette
- 1992: A Heart in Winter (Un cœur en hiver) by Claude Sautet
- 1993: Smoking/No Smoking by Alain Resnais
- 1994: Three Colors: Red (Trois couleurs: Rouge) by Krzysztof Kieślowski
- 1995: Nelly and Monsieur Arnaud (Nelly & Monsieur Arnaud) by Claude Sautet
- 1996: Capitaine Conan by Bertrand Tavernier
- 1997: Same Old Song (On connaît la chanson) by Alain Resnais
- 1998: The Dreamlife of Angels (La vie rêvée des anges) by Erick Zonca
- 1999: Sachs' Disease (La maladie de Sachs) by Michel Deville

=== 2000s ===
- 2000: The Gleaners and I (Les glaneurs et la glaneuse) by Agnès Varda
- 2001: Amélie (Le fabuleux destin d'Amélie Poulain) by Jean-Pierre Jeunet
- 2002: To Be and to Have (Être et avoir) by Nicolas Philibert
- 2003: La trilogie Un couple épatant, Après la vie and Cavale by Lucas Belvaux
- 2004: Kings and Queen (Rois et reine) by Arnaud Desplechin
- 2005: The Beat That My Heart Skipped (De battre mon coeur s'est arrêté) by Jacques Audiard
- 2006: Private Fears in Public Places (Cœurs), by Alain Resnais
- 2007: The Secret of the Grain (La graine et le mulet) by Abdellatif Kechiche
- 2008: The Beaches of Agnès (Les Plages d'Agnès) by Agnès Varda
- 2009: A Prophet by Jacques Audiard

=== 2010s ===
- 2010: Of Gods and Men by Xavier Beauvois
- 2011: The Minister by Pierre Schöller
- 2012: Amour by Michael Haneke
- 2013: Blue Is the Warmest Colour by Abdellatif Kechiche
- 2014: Timbuktu by Abderrahmane Sissako
- 2015: Fatima by Philippe Faucon
- 2016: Elle by Paul Verhoeven
- 2017: 120 Beats per Minute by Robin Campillo
- 2018: Mektoub, My Love: Canto Uno by Abdellatif Kechiche
- 2019: Les misérables by Ladj Ly

=== 2020s ===
- 2020: Les choses qu'on dit, les choses qu'on fait by Emmanuel Mouret
- 2021: Onoda, 10 000 nuits dans la jungle by Arthur Harari
- 2022: Pacifiction – Tourment sur les îles by Albert Serra
- 2023: Anatomy of a Fall by Justine Triet

== Best Foreign Film ==
=== 1960s ===
- 1967: Blowup (Italy) by Michelangelo Antonioni
- 1968: The Red and the White (Hungary) by Miklós Jancsó
- 1969: Rosemary's Baby (USA) by Roman Polanski

=== 1970s ===
- 1970: Andrey Rublyov (Soviet Union) by Andrei Tarkovsky
- 1971: Death in Venice (Italy) by Luchino Visconti
- 1972: Roma (Italy) by Federico Fellini
- 1973: Family Life (UK) by Ken Loach
- 1974: Amarcord (Italy) by Federico Fellini
- 1975: Aguirre, the Wrath of God (West Germany) by Werner Herzog
- 1976: Cría cuervos (Spain) by Carlos Saura
- 1977: Dersu Uzala (Soviet Union) by Akira Kurosawa
- 1978: The Tree of Wooden Clogs (Italy) by Ermanno Olmi
- 1979: Not awarded

=== 1980s ===
- 1980: Christ Stopped at Eboli (Italy) by Francesco Rosi
- 1981: The Elephant Man (USA) by David Lynch
- 1982: The Night of the Shooting Stars (Italy) by Paolo and Vittorio Taviani and Yol (Turkey) by Yılmaz Güney and Serif Gören
- 1983: Fanny and Alexander (Sweden) by Ingmar Bergman
- 1984: Paris, Texas (West Germany) by Wim Wenders
- 1985: The Purple Rose of Cairo (USA) by Woody Allen
- 1986: Hannah and Her Sisters (USA) by Woody Allen
- 1987: Wings of Desire (West Germany) by Wim Wenders
- 1988: The Dead (USA) by John Huston and Bagdad Café (West Germany) by Percy Adlon
- 1989: A Short Film About Killing (Poland) by Krzysztof Kieślowski

=== 1990s ===
- 1990: Dekalog (Poland) by Krzysztof Kieślowski
- 1991: The Double Life of Véronique (Poland) by Krzysztof Kieślowski
- 1992: Man Bites Dog (Belgium) by Rémy Belvaux, André Bonzel and Benoît Poelvoorde and The Story of Qiu Ju (China) by Zhang Yimou
- 1993: Raining Stones (UK) by Ken Loach
- 1994: Exotica (Canada) by Atom Egoyan
- 1995: Land and Freedom (UK) by Ken Loach and Ulysses' Gaze (Greece) by Theodoros Angelopoulos
- 1996: Secrets & Lies (UK) by Mike Leigh
- 1997: Hana-bi (Japan) by Takeshi Kitano
- 1998: Life Is Beautiful (Italy) by Roberto Benigni
- 1999: Eyes Wide Shut (UK/USA) by Stanley Kubrick

=== 2000s ===
- 2000: Yi Yi (Taiwan) by Edward Yang
- 2001: No Man's Land (Bosnia-Herzegovina) by Danis Tanović
- 2002: Talk to Her (Spain) by Pedro Almodóvar
- 2003: Elephant (USA) by Gus Van Sant
- 2004: Lost in Translation (USA) by Sofia Coppola
- 2005: A History of Violence (USA) by David Cronenberg
- 2006: Volver (Spain) by Pedro Almodóvar
- 2007: The Lives of Others (Germany) by Florian Henckel von Donnersmarck
- 2008: There Will Be Blood (USA) by Paul Thomas Anderson
- 2009: The White Ribbon (Austria) by Michael Haneke

=== 2010s ===
- 2010: Another Year (UK) by Mike Leigh
- 2011: Melancholia (Denmark) by Lars von Trier
- 2012: Tabu (Portugal, Germany, Brazil, France) by Miguel Gomes
- 2013: A Touch of Sin (China) by Jia Zhangke
- 2014: Winter Sleep (Turkey) by Nuri Bilge Ceylan
- 2015: Son of Saul (Hungary) by László Nemes
- 2016: Aquarius (Brazil) by Kleber Mendonça Filho
- 2017: Faute d'amour (Russia, France, Belgium, Germany) by Andreï Zviaguintsev
- 2018: Phantom Thread (United States) by Paul Thomas Anderson
- 2019: Parasite (South Korea) by Bong Joon-ho

=== 2020s ===
- 2020: Drunk (Denmark, Sweden, Netherlands) by Thomas Vinterberg
- 2021: Drive My Car (Japan) by Ryusuke Hamaguchi
- 2022: Licorice Pizza (United States) by Paul Thomas Anderson
- 2023: The Fabelmans (United States) by Steven Spielberg

== Best First French Film ==
=== 2000s ===
- 2000: Human Resources by Laurent Cantet
- 2001: De l'histoire ancienne by Orso Miret
- 2002: Beautiful Memories by Zabou Breitman
- 2003: Since Otar Left by Julie Bertucelli
- 2004: A Common Thread by Éléonore Faucher
- 2005: Little Jerusalem by Karin Albou
- 2006: Premonition by Jean-Pierre Darroussin
- 2007: Persepolis by Marjane Satrapi and Vincent Paronnaud
- 2008: Her Name Is Sabine by Sandrine Bonnaire
- 2009: Adieu Gary by Nassim Amaouche

=== 2010s ===
- 2010: Dear Prudence by Rebecca Zlotowski
- 2011: Angel & Tony by Alix Delaporte
- 2012: Louise Wimmer by Cyril Mennegun
- 2013: Me, Myself and Mum by Guillaume Gallienne
- 2014: Love at First Fight by Thomas Cailley
- 2015: The Wakhan Front by Clément Cogitore
- 2016: Dark Inclusion by Arthur Harari
- 2017: Raw by Julia Ducournau
- 2018: Custody by Xavier Legrand
- 2019: Young and Alive by Matthieu Bareyre

=== 2020s ===
- 2020: Josep by Aurel
- 2021: Skies of Lebanon by Chloé Mazlo
- 2022: Bruno Reidal, Confession d'un meurtrier by Vincent Le Port
- 2023: The Rapture by Iris Kaltenbäck

== Best First Foreign Film ==
=== 2010s ===
- 2014: Harmony Lessons (Kazakhstan & Germany) by Emir Baigazin
- 2015: Titli (India) by Kanu Behl
- 2016: Dogs (Romania) by Bogdan Mirică
- 2017: I Am Not a Witch (United Kingdom, France, Germany, Zambia) by Rungano Nyoni
- 2018: Girl (Belgium) by Lukas Dhont
- 2019: An Elephant Sitting Still (China) by Hu Bo

=== 2020s ===
- 2020: Dwelling in the Fuchun Mountains (China) by Gu Xiaogang
- 2021: Freda (Haiti) by Gessica Généus
- 2022: Joyland (Pakistan) by Saim Sadiq
- 2023: 1976 (Chile, Argentina) by Manuela Martelli

== Best French TV Series ==
=== 2010s ===
- 2011: Mysteries of Lisbon by Raoul Ruiz (broadcast by Arte)
- 2012: Un village français by Frédéric Krivine, Philippe Triboit et Emmanuel Daucé (broadcast by France 3)
- 2013: The Returned by Fabrice Gobert et Frédéric Mermoud (broadcast by Canal+)
- 2014: Three Times Manon by Jean-Xavier de Lestrade (broadcast by Arte)
- 2015: The Bureau by Eric Rochant (broadcast by Canal+)
- 2016: The Bureau, series 2, by Eric Rochant (broadcast by Canal+)
- 2017: Manon, 20 Years by Jean-Xavier de Lestrade (broadcast by Arte)
- 2018: Hippocrate by Thomas Lilti (broadcast by Canal+)
- 2019: Savages by Rebecca Zlotowski & Sabri Louatah (broadcast by Canal+)

=== 2020s ===
- 2020: Possessions by Shachar Magen, directed by Thomas Vincent (broadcast by Canal+)
- 2021: Nona et ses filles by Valérie Donzelli (broadcast by Arte)
- 2022: Le Monde de demain by Quillévéré et Hélier Cisterne, Vincent Poymiro, David Elkaïm with collaboration of Laurent Rigoulet (broadcast by Arte)
- 2023: Sambre by Alice Géraud, Marc Herpoux, directed by Jean-Xavier de Lestrade (broadcast by France 2)

== Best Short Film ==
- 1984 : Coup de feu by Magali Clément
- 1999 : Les Aveugles by Jean-Luc Perréard
- 2000 : Ressources humaines by Laurent Cantet
- 2001 : Soufflé by Delphine Coulin
- 2002 : Intimisto by Licia Eminenti
- 2003 : Nosferatu Tango by Zoltán Horváth
- 2004 : Anna, 3 kilos 2 by Laurette Polmanss
- 2005 : Sous mon lit by Jihane Chouaib
- 2006 : Stricteternum by Julien Legrand
