= Patrick Descamps =

Belgian actor and stage director

- Born: Hainaut, Belgium
- Occupation(s): Actor, director
- Years active: 1976–present

Patrick Descamps is a Belgian actor and stage director.

== Theater ==
=== As director ===
Year	Title	Author	Notes
1981	Kriss l’emballeur	Jacques Sternberg	Théâtre de l'Ancre
1981	Striptriste Kloak	Jean-Claude Derudder & Olivier Cauvain	Théâtre royal de Mons
1983	Elles	Jean-Claude Derudder & Olivier Cauvain	Théâtre de l'Ancre
1991	Le cas de William Z	Patrick Iratni	Théâtre de l'Ancre
1996	If This Is a Man	Primo Levi	Théâtre de l'Ancre
1996	The Cabal of Hypocrites	Mikhail Bulgakov	Théâtre de l'Echappée Liège
1996	Une nuit dans la campagne occidentale	Patrick Descamps	Théâtre de l'Ancre
1996-97	Vita and Virginia	Eileen Atkins	Rideau de Bruxelles
1999	Voyage à La Haye	Jean-Luc Lagarce	Théâtre de Poche
2001	La Chambre bleue	Patrick Descamps	Carré des Arts Mons
2001-02	Speak Up! It's So Dark	Niklas Rådström	Théâtre Le Public
2002-04	Twelfth Night	William Shakespeare	Festival au Carré Mons
2004	Chambres	Philippe Minyana	Théâtre Le Public
2006-07	L'Indicible	Jean-Marie Piemme	Théâtre Le Public
2007	Médée Kali	Laurent Gaudé	Théâtre du Méridien Bruxelles

=== As actor ===
Year	Title	Author	Director	Notes
1976-77	The Ride Across Lake Constance	Peter Handke	Elvire Brisson	Théâtre du Sygne
1978	The Caucasian Chalk Circle	Bertolt Brecht	Benno Besson	Théâtre national de Chaillot
1978-79	Doctor Faustus	Christopher Marlowe	Jean-Pierre Dusséaux	Théâtre de Poche
1978-79	Miss Sara Sampson	Gotthold Ephraim Lessing	Jean-Pierre Dusséaux	Théâtre de Poche
1979	Léopold II	Hugo Claus	Martine Wijckaert	Théâtre de La Balsamine
1979	The Balcony	Jean Genet	Elvire Brisson	Théâtre de Poche
1981	Round Heads and Pointed Heads	Bertolt Brecht	Philippe Van Kessel	Maison de la culture de Tournai
1981	L’Internationale des grands-mères	Roland Thibau	Jacques Herbert	Théâtre de l'Ancre
1982	L’inauguration	Martine Wijckaert	Martine Wijckaert	Théâtre de La Balsamine
1983	Grands soirs	Jean-Pierre Klein	Martine Wijckaert	Théâtre de La Balsamine
1983	Bremer Freiheit	Rainer Werner Fassbinder	Jean-Marie Vervisch	Chapelle des Brigittines
1984-85	The Cherry Orchard	Anton Chekhov	Michel Dezoteux	Théâtre Varia
1984-86	Un Faust	Jean Louvet	Marc Liebens	Théâtral Mobile Bruxelles; Ève Award - Best Actor
1985	Trilogie des Wiedersehens	Botho Strauß	Philippe Van Kessel	National Theatre of Strasbourg
1986-87	Les Pupilles du tigre	Paul Emond	Philippe Sireuil	Salle Saint-Michel Bruxelles
1986-89	The Mission	Heiner Müller	Marcel Delval & Michel Dezoteux	Théâtral Mobile Bruxelles
1987-88	La Théorie du mouchoir	Martine Wijckaert	Martine Wijckaert	Théâtre de La Balsamine
1988	Britannicus	Jean Racine	Marcel Delval & Michel Dezoteux	Théâtre Varia
1988	A Respectable Wedding	Bertolt Brecht	Michel Dezoteux	Théâtre Varia
1988	Cuir 88	Jean-Claude Derudder & Jean-Pierre Denefve	Jean-Claude Derudder & Jean-Pierre Denefve	Théâtre de Liège
1989-90	Fierrabras	Franz Schubert & Joseph Kupelwieser	Philippe Sireuil	Théâtre de la Monnaie
1990-93	Yes	Thomas Bernhard	Marc Liebens	Théâtre Varia
1991	The Accompanist	Nina Berberova	Barbara Bua	Théâtre Varia
1991-93	The Seagull	Anton Chekhov	Philippe Sireuil	Théâtre des 13 vents
1991-93	La force de l’habitude	Thomas Bernhard	Barbara Bua	Théâtre de l'Ancre
1992	Les Bisons d’Amérique	Martin S. Garretson	Barbara Bua	Théâtre Varia
1992-94	Uncle Vanya	Anton Chekhov	Philippe Sireuil	Théâtre Varia
1993	Cape of Storms	Nina Berberova	Barbara Bua	Théâtre de l'Ancre
1993-94	Flammes	Pierre Mertens	Patrick Bonté	Théâtre National de la Communauté
1994-95	West Pier	Bernard-Marie Koltès	Frédéric Dussenne	Rideau de Bruxelles
1995	L’équilibre	Botho Strauß	Jules-Henri Marchant	National Theatre of Strasbourg
1995	Cendres de cailloux	Daniel Danis	Lukas Hemleb	Théâtre de l'Ancre
1995-97	Jascha	Yasmina Reza	Thierry Debroux	Petit Théâtre du Palais des Beaux-Arts; Prix Tenue de ville - Best Actor
1996	Der Kontrabaß	Patrick Süskind	Khadija El Maachi	Théâtre de La Balsamine
1996-97	Who's Afraid of Virginia Woolf?	Edward Albee	Michel Kacenelenbogen	Théâtre Le Public
1997	Zoo de nuit	Michel Azama	Philippe Sireuil	Théâtre Varia
1997-98	Death of a Salesman	Arthur Miller	Michel Kacenelenbogen	Théâtre Le Public
1997-2003	La Musica deuxième	Marguerite Duras	Philippe Sireuil	Théâtre Le Public
1998	Et de toutes mes terres rien ne me reste que la longueur de mon corps	William Shakespeare	Martine Wijckaert	Festival d'Avignon
1998-99	Hunger	Knut Hamsun	France Gilmont	Théâtre de Poche
1998-99	The Misanthrope	Molière	Michel Kacenelenbogen	Théâtre Le Public
1999-2000	Nous les héros	Jean-Luc Lagarce	Philippe Sireuil	Théâtre Varia
2000	Le Pain dur	Paul Claudel	Frédéric Dussenne	Théâtre de la Place des Martyrs
2000	Who's Afraid of Virginia Woolf?	Edward Albee	Michel Kacenelenbogen	Théâtre Le Public
2000-01	Kean	Alexandre Dumas	Michel Kacenelenbogen	Théâtre Le Public
2001	The Cosmonaut's Last Message to the Woman; He Once Loved in the Former Soviet Union	David Greig	Jules-Henri Marchant	Rideau de Bruxelles
2002	A Doll's House	Henrik Ibsen	Jules-Henri Marchant	Rideau de Bruxelles
2002	The Dance of Death	August Strindberg	Michel Kacenelenbogen	Théâtre Le Public
2002-04	Hedda Gabler	Henrik Ibsen	Philippe Sireuil	Théâtre de l'Athénée
2005-06	Sokkot	Éric Durnez	Frédéric Dussenne	Tour
2005-06	Mathilde	Véronique Olmi	Michel Kacenelenbogen	Théâtre Le Public
2007-10	Garde à Vue	John Wainwright	Olivier Massart	Théâtre Le Public
2011-12	Red	John Logan	Michel Kacenelenbogen	Théâtre Le Public
2013-14	Romeo and Juliet	William Shakespeare	Yves Beaunesne	Théâtre du Beauvaisis Beauvais

== Filmography ==
Year	Title	Role	Director	Notes
1994	Le petit rouge	The barman	Manuel Gómez	Short
1995	William Z	The man	Patrick Iratni	Short
1995	Le dossier B.	Albert Lessing	Wilbur Leguebe	TV movie
1995	Le retour d'Arsène Lupin		Philippe Condroyer	TV series (1 episode)
1996	Menteur	Georges	Damien de Pierpont	Short
1997	L'Instit	Gontrand	José Pinheiro	TV series (1 episode)
1998	Une leçon d'amour	The mechanic	Alain Tasma	TV movie
2001	La colère du diable	Father Mercier	Chris Vander Stappen	TV movie
2002	On the Run	Jacquillat	Lucas Belvaux	
2002	After the Life	Jacquillat	Lucas Belvaux	
2003	The Alzheimer Case	Gilles Resnais	Erik Van Looy	
2003	Les Hommes de ma vie		Karine de Villers	Short
2004	Nature contre nature	Maurice	Lucas Belvaux	TV movie
2005	Trouble	The orphanage's director	Harry Cleven	
2005	Itinéraires	Gérard Fontaine	Christophe Otzenberger	
2005	La trahison	Captain Franchet	Philippe Faucon	
2005	Live and Become	Narrator	Radu Mihăileanu	
2005	Nom de code : DP	Maxence	Patrick Dewolf	TV movie
2005	Rose et Val	Monsieur Portier	Stéphane Kappes	TV series (1 episode)
2006	Private Property	Luc	Joachim Lafosse	
2006	The Right of the Weakest	Jean-Pierre	Lucas Belvaux	
2006	Comme personne		Géraldine Doignon	Short
2007	Le dernier gang	Inspector Brevard	Ariel Zeitoun	
2007	Poison d'avril	Ackerman	William Karel	TV movie
2007	Au bout de mon rêve	The doctor	Christophe Otzenberger	TV movie
2007	Les prédateurs	Mathieu Valentini	Lucas Belvaux	TV series (1 episode)
2007	La commune	Maurice Dubar	Philippe Triboit	TV series (8 episodes)
2008	Unspoken	Monsieur Tournier	Fien Troch	
2008	Versailles	Jean-Jacques	Pierre Schoeller	
2008	Sur ta joue ennemie	Patrick	Jean-Xavier de Lestrade	
2008	Complot d'amateurs	Captain Timmermans	Vincent Monnet	TV movie
2009	Rapt	Massart	Lucas Belvaux	
2009	In the Beginning	Bollard	Xavier Giannoli	
2009	La cantante de tango	Marc	Diego Martínez Vignatti	
2009	Une chaîne pour deux	Victor Granville	Frédéric Ledoux	
2009	L’Oncle Vincent	Paul	Sylvain Montagnac	Short
2009-17	Un village français	Henri De Kervern	Jean-Philippe Amar, Philippe Triboit, ...	TV series (30 episodes)
2010	Angel & Tony	Yohan's grandfather	Alix Delaporte	
2010	Black Heaven	Marion's father	Gilles Marchand	
2010	A Cat in Paris	Monsieur Patate	Jean-Loup Felicioli & Alain Gagnol	
2010	C'est déjà l'été	Jean Bournonville	Martijn Maria Smits	
2010	Une Mignardise	Jules	Jean Berthier	Short
2010	Porteur d'hommes	Franck's father	Antarès Bassis	Short
2011	Mineurs 27	Jean-Paul Casarelli	Tristan Aurouet	
2011	Terre nouvelle	Gregorieff	Bernard Dresse	Short
2011	Un homme debout	Joël	Foued Mansour	Short
2011	Merci patron !	Antoine	Pierre Joassin	TV movie
2011	L'âme du mal	Pierre Beaumont	Jérôme Foulon	TV movie
2011	Joseph l'insoumis	The giant	Caroline Glorion	TV movie
2011	Qui sème le vent...	Claude Verdier	Frédéric Garson	TV movie
2012	Torpedo	Robert	Matthieu Donck	
2012	One Night	Petrini	Lucas Belvaux	
2012	Blind Spot	Beaulieue	Christophe Wagner	
2012	La mère morte	Yvon	Thierry Charrier	Short
2012	Berthe Morisot	Monsieur Morisot	Caroline Champetier	TV movie
2012	La main passe	Hoffmann	Thierry Petit	TV movie
2012	R.I.S, police scientifique	Henri Marcon	Claire de la Rochefoucauld	TV series (1 episode)
2012	Les Petits Meurtres d'Agatha Christie	Chesnais	Eric Woreth	TV series (1 episode)
2013	Angélique	Archbishop of Toulouse	Ariel Zeitoun	
2013	Pour le meilleur	Serge	Marie Vernalde	Short
2013	La Chambre noire	The photographer	Maxime Pistorio	Short
2013	Nous sommes tous des êtres penchés	The father	Simon Lelouch	Short
2013	Boulevard du Palais	Father Leguyadère	Jean-Marc Vervoort	TV series (1 episode)
2013	À tort ou à raison	Willy Van Dorp	Alain Brunard	TV series (2 episodes)
2014	The Connection	The prosecutor	Cédric Jimenez	
2014	Emma	Doctor	Eric Godon	Short
2014	Août 1914		Fedrik De Beul	Short
2014	Helix Aspersa	The father	Grégoire Graesslin	Short
2014	L'héritière	Léon	Alain Tasma	TV movie
2014	Marie Curie, une femme sur le front	Louis Ragot	Alain Brunard	TV movie
2014	Kontainer Kats	Uncle Jacques	Michelangelo Marchese	TV mini-series
2015	Phantom Boy	The Big Guy	Jean-Loup Felicioli & Alain Gagnol	
2015	The Boss's Daughter	Baretti	Olivier Loustau	
2015	Comme ils s'en vont	Michel	Benjamin Jungers	Short
2015	Si la photo est bonne	Joseph	Luc Battiston	Short
2015	À ses enfants la patrie reconnaissante	The mayor	Stéphane Landowski	Short
2015	Flic, tout simplement	Judge Thiel	Yves Rénier	TV movie
2015	Presque comme les autres	Paul	Renaud Bertrand	TV movie
2016	Odd Job	Walter	Pascal Chaumeil	
2016	Irreplaceable	Francis Maroini	Thomas Lilti	
2016	The Visitors: Bastille Day	Louis VI	Jean-Marie Poiré	
2016	Le mec de la tombe d'à côté	Gérard	Agnès Obadia	TV movie
2016	Cherif	Edouard Vasseur	Akim Isker	TV series (1 episode)
2016	Accused	Maxime	Julien Despaux	TV series (1 episode)
2016	Section zéro	Doc	Ivan Fegyveres	TV series (8 episodes)
2017	Knock	The captain	Lorraine Lévy	
2017	Broers	Josephine's father	Bram Schouw	
2017	This Is Our Land	Jacques Duhez	Lucas Belvaux	Nominated - Magritte Award for Best Supporting Actor
2017	The Royal Exchange	Maréchal de Villeroy	Marc Dugain	
2017	Mystère à la Tour Eiffel	Ferdinand Massart	Léa Fazer	TV movie
2017	Transferts	Vincent Mareuil	Olivier Guignard & Antoine Charreyron	TV series (5 episodes)
2018	Le collier rouge	Gabarre	Jean Becker	
2018	Du soleil dans mes yeux	The agency manager	Nicolas Giraud	
2018	Nuit chérie		Lia Bertels	Short
2018	Léopold, roi des Belges	The death	Cédric Vandresse & Alain Richard	Short
2018	Ce que vivent les roses	Jean-Baptiste Rochere	Frédéric Berthe	TV movie
2018	Ils ont échangé mon enfant	Inspector Leguen	Agnès Obadia	TV movie
2018	Marie-Antoinette, ils ont jugé la reine	Simon	Alain Brunard	TV movie
2018	The Crimson Rivers	Philipp Schüller	Ivan Fegyveres	TV series (2 episodes)
2018-23	Tandem	Pierre Soler	Jason Roffé, Lionel Chatton, ...	TV series (48 episodes)
2019	La maladroite	Doctor Philippe	Éléonore Faucher	TV movie
2020	Erna at War	French Camp Commander	Henrik Ruben Genz	
2020	Terrible Jungle	Conrad Saint-Gil	Hugo Benamozig & David Caviglioli	
2020	L'oiseau de paradis	Deputy Gilot	Paul Manate	
2020	Le milieu de l'horizon	Annibal	Delphine Lehericey	
2021	The Restless	Patrick	Joachim Lafosse	Nominated - Magritte Award for Best Supporting Actor
2021	The Man in the Basement	Gérard	Philippe Le Guay	
2021	Gloria	Philippe Lazargue	Julien Colonna	TV mini-series
2021	Le Voyageur	Pierre Shall	Stéphanie Murat	TV series (1 episode)
2022	Meurtres à Figeac	Hubert	Olivier Barma	TV Movie
2023	Sambre	Michel Gravuski	Jean-Xavier de Lestrade	TV series (1 episode)
TBA	Les poings serrés	Grandfather	Vivian Goffette	Post-Production
TBA	Rivière perdue		Jean-Christophe Delpias	TV series Post-Production

== Dubbing ==
Year	Title	Role	Actor	Director	Notes
1997	Pokémon	Giovanni			TV series (1 episode)
2000	Crime and Punishment in Suburbia	Fred Skolnik	Michael Ironside	Rob Schmidt	
2000-03	X-Men: Evolution	Magneto	Christopher Judge	Several	TV series (19 episodes)
2001-02	The Zeta Project	Infiltration Unit No. 7	Robert Goodman	Several	TV series (2 episodes)
2003	The Foreigner	Jonathan Cold	Steven Seagal	Michael Oblowitz	
2004	The Merchant of Venice	Shylock	Al Pacino	Michael Radford	
2005	Pokémon	Giovanni			TV series (1 episode)
2006	Tristan & Isolde	King Donnchadh	David O'Hara	Kevin Reynolds	
2007	Cleaner	Tom Cutler	Samuel L. Jackson	Renny Harlin	
2008	The Escapist	Frank Perry	Brian Cox	Rupert Wyatt	
2009	Pope Joan	Pope Sergius II	John Goodman	Sönke Wortmann	
2009	Les contes de Grimm			Oliver Dieckmann & Dick Regel	TV series (2 episodes)
2010	Everybody's Fine	Frank Goode	Robert De Niro	Kirk Jones	
2010	All About Steve	Danny	Keith David	Phil Traill	
2010	Barbie in A Mermaid Tale	Break Summers	Garry Chalk	Adam L. Wood	
2010	Marvel Anime	The Beast		Yuzo Sato	
2010	Doctor Who - A Christmas Carol	Kazran/Elliot Sardick	Michael Gambon	Toby Haynes	TV series (1 episode)
2012	Cowboy Bebop: The Movie	Jet Black		Shinichirō Watanabe	
2012	Barbie in A Mermaid Tale 2	Break Summers	Garry Chalk	William Lau	
2013	The Family	Fred Blake/Giovanni Manzoni	Robert De Niro	Luc Besson	
2013	Black Nativity	Reverend Cornell Cobbs	Forest Whitaker	Kasi Lemmons	
2014	Fack ju Göhte	Monsieur Gundlach	Bernd Stegemann	Bora Dağtekin	
2015	Ooops! Noah Is Gone...	Mastoc	Tilo Schmitz	Toby Genkel & Sean McCormack	
