= Gilbert Melki =

French actor (born 1958)

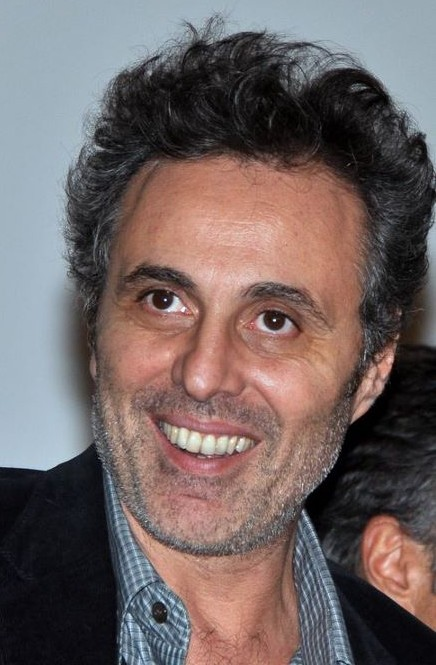
- Gilbert Melki in 2012
- Born: 12 November 1958 (age 66); Paris, France
- Years active: 1992—present

Gilbert Melki (French pronunciation: [ʒilbɛʁ mɛlˈki]; born 12 November 1958) is a French actor.

== Life and career ==
Nephew of actor Claude Melki (The Acrobat), Melki grew up in a Jewish family from Algeria. His father, an antiques dealer, came from Khenchela in Algeria and his mother was from France. Both hid during the World War II: his father in Lyon and his mother in Normandy.

His father sent him to a woodworking school, but Melki only stayed a few months. At 20 he decided to move towards comedy and took multiple drama classes. Fearful of not being up to par he went to live for several years in Italy.

After a first appearance on screen in 1992 in the Claude Chabrol film Betty, Gilbert Melki rose to prominence in 1996 through Would I Lie To You? by Thomas Gilou in which he played Patrick Abitbol, a great businessman and millionaire megalomaniac, a role he revisited in the sequel in 2001.

His later films include the 2005 film Crustacés et Coquillages. In 2012, he moved to television with the Canal+ comedy series Kaboul Kitchen.

== Filmography ==
- 1992

Betty by Claude Chabrol

- 1997

La Vérité si je mens ! by Thomas Gilou
Un amour de sorcière by René Manzor
Une journée de merde by Miguel Courtois

- 1998

Méditerranées by Philippe Bérenger
La Patinoire by Jean-Philippe Toussaint
Grève party by Fabien Onteniente

- 1999

Chili con carne by Thomas Gilou
Monsieur Naphtali by Olivier Schatzky
Vénus beauté (institut) by Tonie Marshall

- 2000

On fait comme on a dit by Philippe Berenger
La Taule by Alain Robak

- 2001

A Hell of a Day by Marion Vernoux
Les Morsures de l'aube by Antoine de Caunes
La Vérité si je mens ! 2 by Thomas Gilou

- 2002

Un couple épatant by Lucas Belvaux
Cavale by Lucas Belvaux
Après la vie by Lucas Belvaux
Au plus près du paradis by Tonie Marshall

- 2003

Monsieur Ibrahim et les fleurs du Coran by François Dupeyron
Rencontre avec le dragon by Hélène Angel

- 2004

Les Temps qui changent (Changing Times) by André Téchiné
Prendre femme by Ronit Elkabetz and Shlomi Elkabetz
Incautos by Miguel Bardem
Confidences trop intimes (Intimate Strangers) by Patrice Leconte

- 2005

Angel-A by Luc Besson
Palais royal! by Valérie Lemercier

- 2006

Crustacés et coquillages (Cockles and Muscles) by Olivier Ducastel and Jacques Martineau
Ça brûle by Claire Simon
La Raison du plus faible by Lucas Belvaux
Mr. Average

- 2007

Le Deuxième Souffle by Alain Corneau
Anna M. by Michel Spinosa
Très bien, merci by Emmanuelle Cuau
Cowboy by Benoît Mariage
Le Tueur by Cédric Anger

- 2008

Made in Italy by Stéphane Giusti
Largo Winch by Jérôme Salle

- 2009

Accomplices by Frédéric Mermoud

- 2010

Le Mac by Pascal Bourdiaux
L’Avocat by Cédric Anger

- 2012
  La vérité si je mens ! 3 by Thomas Gilou
- 2016
  Vendeur by Sylvain Desclous
- 2019
  Le Bazar de la Charité by Alexandre Laurent
- 2024

Cat's Eyes by Alexandre Laurent
