= Dominique Blanc (actress) =

French actress (born 1956)

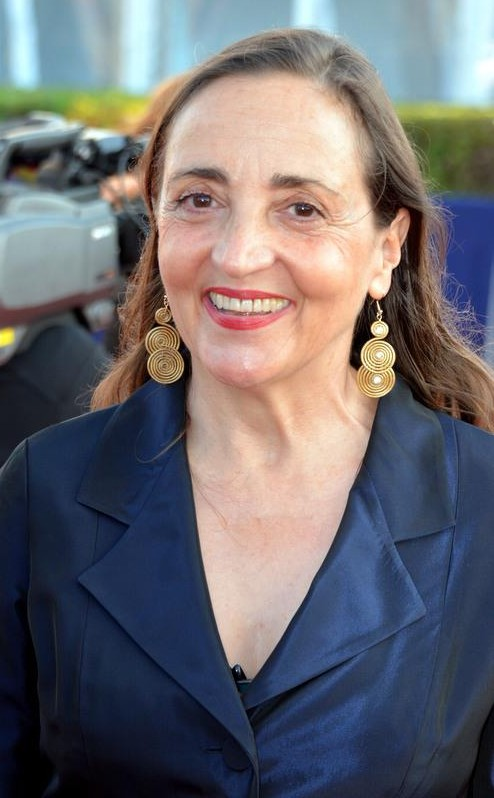
- Blanc in 2017
- Born: 25 April 1956 (age 70); Lyon, France
- Education: Cours Florent
- Occupation: Actress
- Years active: 1981–present
- Spouse: Christian Jean
- Children: 2 daughters

Dominique Blanc (born 25 April 1956) is a French actress. She is known for her roles in the films May Fools (1990), Indochine (1992), La Reine Margot (1994), Those Who Love Me Can Take the Train (1998), and The Other One (2008). In a career of nearly four decades so far, Blanc has won four César Awards from nine nominations.

== Life and career ==
In 1980, at the suggestion of Pierre Romans, her instructor at the French Drama school, Cours Florent, she met with Patrice Chéreau who engaged her for a performance of Henrik Ibsen's Peer Gynt. She remained one of Chéreau's preferred actresses.

One of the most critically acclaimed French actresses, Blanc has won four César Awards. One for Best Actress in 2000 for Stand-by and three for Best Actress in a Supporting Role: in 1990 for May Fools (Milou en mai), in 1992 for Indochine and in 1998 for Those Who Love Me Can Take the Train (Ceux qui m'aiment prendront le train) and has been nominated four more times. On 6 September 2008, she won the Volpi Cup for Best Actress at the 65th Venice Film Festival.

== Filmography ==
Year	Title	Role	Director	Notes
1983	Richelieu ou La journée des dupes	Madame de Comballet	Jean-Dominique de La Rochefoucauld	TV movie
1984	Lace	Teresa	William Hale	TV Mini-Series
1985	Camisole de force	The Bar's Woman	Rémy Le Gall Boissière	Short
1985	Néo Polar	Marie-Laure	Michel Andrieu	TV series (1 Episode)
1986	The Woman of My Life	Sylvia	Régis Wargnier	Nominated - César Award for Most Promising Actress
1986	L'iguane	The Woman	Serge Meynard	Short
1986	L'inconnue de Vienne	Martine	Bernard Stora	TV movie
1987	The Distant Land	Adèle Natter	Luc Bondy	
1987	Les Cinq Dernières Minutes	Madeleine	Joannick Desclers	TV series (1 Episode)
1988	Natalia	Jacqueline Leroux	Bernard Cohn	
1988	Savannah	Jeanne	Marco Pico	
1988	Quelques jours avec moi	Georgette	Claude Sautet	
1988	Story of Women	Jasmine	Claude Chabrol	
1988	Les enquêtes du commissaire Maigret	Eva	Philippe Laïk	TV series (1 Episode)
1988	Sueurs froides	The Nurse	Régis Wargnier (2)	TV series (1 Episode)
1989	Je suis le seigneur du château	Madame Vernet	Régis Wargnier (3)	Nominated - César Award for Most Promising Actress
1990	May Fools	Claire	Louis Malle	César Award for Best Supporting Actress
1991	Plaisir d'amour	Clo	Nelly Kaplan	
1991	Largo desolato	Lucy	Agnieszka Holland	TV movie
1992	L'affût	Isabelle Morigny	Yannick Bellon	
1992	Indochine	Yvette	Régis Wargnier (4)	César Award for Best Supporting Actress
1992	L'échange	The Woman	Vincent Pérez	Short
1993	Faut-il aimer Mathilde ?	Mathilde	Edwin Baily	Festival International du Film Francophone de Namur - Best Actress
1993	Une femme en bataille	Colette Bonzo	Camille Brottes	Short
1994	Loin des barbares	Zana	Liria Bégéja	
1994	La Reine Margot	Henriette of Cleves	Patrice Chéreau	Nominated - César Award for Best Supporting Actress
1994	Train de nuit	The Woman	Michel Piccoli	Short
1995	Total Eclipse	Isabelle Rimbaud	Agnieszka Holland (2)	
1996	Le livre de minuit	The Mother	Thierry Binisti	Short
1996	Faisons un rêve	She	Jean-Michel Ribes	TV movie
1996	L'allée du roi	Marquise de Maintenon	Nina Companeez	TV Mini-Series
1997	C'est pour la bonne cause !	Jeanne	Jacques Fansten	
1997	Alors voilà,	Rose	Michel Piccoli (2)	
1998	Those Who Love Me Can Take the Train	Catherine	Patrice Chéreau (2)	César Award for Best Supporting Actress
1998	A Soldier's Daughter Never Cries	Candida	James Ivory	
1999	La voleuse de Saint-Lubin	Françoise Barnier	Claire Devers	
1999	Le mariage de Fanny	The Narrator	Olivier L. Brunet	Short
2000	Actors	Geneviève	Bertrand Blier	
2000	Stand-by	Hélène	Roch Stéphanik	César Award for Best Actress; Cairo International Film Festival - Best Actress
2000	Sur quel pied danser ?	Jeanne	Jacques Fansten (2)	TV movie
2001	La plage noire	Sylvie	Michel Piccoli (3)	
2001	Avec tout mon amour	Adèle	Amalia Escriva	
2001	The Milk of Human Kindness	Claire	Dominique Cabrera	Locarno International Film Festival - Best Ensemble
2001	The Pornographer	Jeanne	Bertrand Bonello	
2001	Un pique-nique chez Osiris	Olympe de Cardoville	Nina Companeez (2)	TV movie
2002	Peau d'Ange	Sister Augustine	Vincent Pérez (2)	
2002	Cavale	Agnès Manise	Lucas Belvaux	
2002	Un couple épatant	Agnès Manise	Lucas Belvaux (2)	
2002	Après la vie	Agnès Manise	Lucas Belvaux (3)	
2002	C'est le bouquet !	Edith	Jeanne Labrune	Nominated - César Award for Best Supporting Actress
2005	The Art of Breaking Up	Baronne Duverger	Michel Deville	
2005	Burnt Out	Clémence Durrieux	Fabienne Godet	
2006	Les amitiés maléfiques	Florence Duhaut	Emmanuel Bourdieu	
2006	Le Cri	Pierrette Guibert	Hervé Baslé	TV Mini-Series
2007	Capitaine Achab	Anna	Philippe Ramos	
2007	Monsieur Max	Alice	Gabriel Aghion	TV movie
2007	Le pendu	Alma	Claire Devers (2)	TV movie
2008	Plus tard	Tania	Amos Gitai	
2008	Par suite d'un arrêt de travail...	Fabienne	Frédéric Andréi	
2008	The Other One	Anne-Marie Meier	Patrick-Mario Bernard & Pierre Trividic	Venice Film Festival - Volpi Cup for Best Actress; Nominated - César Award for Best Actress
2009	Un homme d'honneur	Gilberte Bérégovoy	Laurent Heynemann	TV movie
2010	L'Autre Dumas	Céleste Scriwaneck	Safy Nebbou	
2010	A Cat in Paris	Jeanne	Jean-Loup Felicioli & Alain Gagnol	
2011	Un autre monde	Fanny	Gabriel Aghion (2)	TV movie
2011	À la recherche du temps perdu	Madame Verdurin	Nina Companeez (3)	TV Mini-Series
2012	J'irai au pays des neiges	Alexandra David-Néel	Joël Farges	TV movie
2015	Mad Love	Armance	Philippe Ramos (2)	
2015	Spectrographies	Nadja	Dorothée Smith	
2015	Versailles	Anne of Austria	Jalil Lespert	TV series (1 Episode)
2016	Peur de rien	Madame Gagnebin	Danielle Arbid	
2016	Heal the Living	Lucie Moret	Katell Quillévéré	
2017	Patients	Dr. Challes	Grand Corps Malade & Mehdi Idir	
2022	The Origin of Evil (L'Origine du mal)	Louise Dumontet	Sébastien Marnier	
2025	Leave One Day	Fanfan	Amélie Bonnin	
TBA	Maigret in Society		Pascal Bonitzer	Pre-production

== Theatre ==
Year	Title	Author	Director	Notes
1981	Peer Gynt	Henrik Ibsen	Patrice Chéreau	
1982	Schliemann, épisodes ignorés	Bruno Bayen	Bruno Bayen	
1983	The Screens	Jean Genet	Patrice Chéreau	
1983	The Idiot	Fyodor Dostoyevsky	Jean-Louis Thamin	
1983	Tonio Kröger	Thomas Mann	Pierre Romans	
1984	The Vast Domain	Arthur Schnitzler	Luc Bondy	
1985–86	The Underpants	Carl Sternheim	Jacques Rosner	
1987	The Marriage of Figaro	Pierre Beaumarchais	Jean-Pierre Vincent	Nominated - Molière Award for Best Female Newcomer
1988	The Misanthrope	Molière	Antoine Vitez	
1988	Anacaona	Jean Metellus	Antoine Vitez (2)	
1993–94	Woyzeck	Georg Büchner	Jean-Pierre Vincent (2)	
1996	Poèmes et proses	René Char		Festival d'Avignon
1996	Apothéose	Arthur Schnitzler		Festival d'Avignon
1997	A Doll's House	Henrik Ibsen	Deborah Warner	Molière Award for Best Actress
2000	Mickey La Torche	Natacha de Pontcharra		Festival d'Avignon
2002	The Seagull	Anton Tchekhov	Philippe Calvario	
2003	Phèdre	Jean Racine	Patrice Chéreau (3)	Nominated - Molière Award for Best Actress
2008–11	La Douleur	Marguerite Duras	Patrice Chéreau (4)	Molière Award for Best Actress
2012	Perséphone	Igor Stravinsky	Peter Sellars	
2013	The Mistress of the Inn	Carlo Goldoni	Marc Paquien	
2015	Les Liaisons dangereuses	Pierre Choderlos de Laclos	Christine Letailleur	
2016	Britannicus	Jean Racine	Stéphane Braunschweig	
2016	Vania	Anton Tchekhov	Julie Deliquet	
2017	Le Petit-Maître corrigé	Pierre de Marivaux	Clément Hervieu-Léger	
2017	Le Testament de Marie	Colm Tóibín	Deborah Warner	

== Decorations ==
- Officer of the Order of Legion of Honour
- Commander of the Ordre National du Mérite
- Commander of the Order of Arts and Letters (2015)
