= The Other One (film) =

- Film poster
- Directed by: Patrick Mario Bernard; Pierre Trividic
- Starring: Dominique Blanc; Cyril Gueï; Peter Bonke; Christèle Tual
- Cinematography: Pierric Gantelmi d'Ille
- Music by: Rep Müzak
- Release date: 2008
- Language: French
- Box office: $821.882

The Other One (French: L'Autre) is a 2008 French drama film directed by Patrick Mario Bernard and Pierre Trividic, based on the novel L'Occupation by Annie Ernaux. It was an entrant at the 65th Venice International Film Festival in 2008. For her performance, Dominique Blanc won the Volpi Cup for best actress.

== Cast ==
- Dominique Blanc as Anne-Marie
- Cyril Gueï as Alex
- Peter Bonke as Lars
- Christèle Tual as Aude
- Anne Benoît as Maryse Schneider
- Helena Noguerra as Lars's guest
