= Vendeur =

- Theatrical release poster
- Directed by: Sylvain Desclous
- Written by: Sylvain Desclous; Olivier Lorelle (collaboration); Salvatore Lista (collaboration); Agnès Feuvre (collaboration)
- Produced by: Florence Borelly
- Starring: Gilbert Melki; Pio Marmaï
- Cinematography: Emmanuel Soyer
- Edited by: Isabelle Poudevigne
- Music by: Amaury Chabauty
- Production companies: Sésame Films; France 2 Cinéma
- Distributed by: BAC Films
- Release date: 4 May 2016
- Running time: 89 minutes
- Country: France
- Language: French
- Budget: $3.5 million
- Box office: $350.000

Vendeur is a 2016 French dramedy film directed by Sylvain Desclous and co-written by Desclous in collaboration with Olivier Lorelle, Salvatore Lista and Agnès Feuvre. It stars Gilbert Melki and Pio Marmaï.

== Cast ==
- Gilbert Melki as Serge
- Pio Marmaï as Gérald
- Pascal Elso as Daniel
- Clémentine Poidatz as Karole
- Sara Giraudeau as Chloé
- Damien Bonnard as Lilian
- Christian Hecq as Georges
- Serge Livrozet as Serge's father
- Bernard Blancan as The doctor
- Norbert Ferrer as Dove
