= Nature contre nature =

2005 television film directed by Lucas Belvaux

- Screenplay by: Lucas Belvaux; Jean-Luc Gaget
- Directed by: Lucas Belvaux
- Starring: Lucas Belvaux
- Music by: Riccardo Del Fra
- Country of origin: France

Original release
- Release: 2004

Nature contre nature is a French television film comedy, broadcast in 2004, directed by Lucas Belvaux, and scripted by Lucas Belvaux with Jean-Luc Gaget.

== Plot ==
Sébastien Chantoux, (Lucas Belvaux), a psychoanalyst, leaves Paris and goes to live in the Creuse, at Royère-de-Vassivière. Hardly settled, he discovers "Troc'En Creuse", a system of local exchange that operates through the use of barter. Initially reticent about using it and bartering his psychoanalytic sessions, he is reconciled to the system, and in a few weeks becomes a figure in the community. Everything seems to be working out, and without costing Sébastien a sou, until the arrival of Mlle. Oudinot, (Catherine Mouchet), a tax inspector. War is declared; "Troc'En Creuse" and the small local economy against the capitalism of the state.

== Cast ==
- Lucas Belvaux as Sébastien Chantoux
- Raphaele Godin as Clémence
- Catherine Mouchet as Mlle Oudinot
- Jacques Spiesser as M Lorieux
- Henri Guybert as Yves Lambert
- Nicolas Silberg as Bertrand Laplace
- Michèle Gleizer as Violette Lambert
- Liliane Rovère as Rose
- Pierre-François Dumeniaud as Robert Crespeau
- Joël Lefrançois as Jean-Hervé Gentioux
- Bernard Mazzinghi as Jean-Paul
- Pascal Elso as The hunter
- François Morel as Bertrand Crémieux
- Patrick Descamps as Maurice
