= The Right of the Weakest =

2006 film

- A poster with the film's English title: The Right of the Weakest
- Directed by: Lucas Belvaux
- Written by: Lucas Belvaux
- Produced by: Patrick Sobelman
- Starring: Eric Caravaca
- Cinematography: Pierre Milon
- Edited by: Ludo Troch
- Release date: 24 May 2006
- Running time: 116 minutes
- Country: Belgium
- Language: French
- Budget: $5 million
- Box office: $1.1 million

The Right of the Weakest (French: La Raison du plus faible) is a 2006 Belgian drama film directed by Lucas Belvaux. It was entered into the 2006 Cannes Film Festival.

== Cast ==
- Eric Caravaca as Patrick
- Lucas Belvaux as Marc Pirmet
- Claude Semal as Robert
- Patrick Descamps as Jean-Pierre
- Natacha Régnier as Carole
- Elie Belvaux as Steve
- Gilbert Melki as Le ferrailleur
