= Feelings (2003 film) =

- Directed by: Noémie Lvovsky
- Written by: Noémie Lvovsky; Florence Seyvos
- Produced by: Claude Berri; Laurent Pétin; Michèle Pétin
- Starring: Nathalie Baye; Jean-Pierre Bacri
- Cinematography: Jean-Marc Fabre
- Edited by: François Gédigier
- Music by: Jeff Cohen; Philippe Rouèche
- Production companies: Hirsch; ARP Sélection; TF1 Films Production
- Distributed by: ARP Sélection
- Release dates: 1 September 2003 (VIFF); 5 November 2003 (France)
- Running time: 94 minutes
- Country: France
- Language: French
- Budget: €7.6 million
- Box office: $8.2 million

Feelings (French: Les Sentiments) is a 2003 French drama film written by Noémie Lvovsky and Florence Setvos and directed by Lvovsky.

== Plot ==
François and Edith are newlyweds. François, a new doctor, is offered to take over Jacques' small-town practice. Jacques and his wife Carole offer the newlyweds to rent a small cottage in their property.

The two couples soon form a friendship and soon beautiful young Edith begins a sexual relationship with Jacques. The romance however, is discovered and Edith leaves Jacques to get back to her husband destroying the older couple in the process.

== Cast ==
- Nathalie Baye as Carole
- Jean-Pierre Bacri as Jacques
- Isabelle Carré as Edith
- Melvil Poupaud as François
- Agathe Bonitzer as Sonia
- Virgile Grünberg as Léo
- Valeria Bruni Tedeschi as a young mother

== Accolades ==
Award / Film Festival	Category	Recipients and nominees	Result
César Awards	Best Film		Nominated
César Awards	Best Actor	Jean-Pierre Bacri	Nominated
César Awards	Best Actress	Nathalie Baye	Nominated
César Awards	Best Actress	Isabelle Carré	Nominated
Louis Delluc Prize	Best Film		Won
Venice International Film Festival	Golden Lion		Nominated
