= Philippe van Kessel =

Belgian actor and stage director (1946–2022)

Philippe van Kessel (14 January 1946 – 11 February 2022) was a Belgian actor and stage director. He is known for his roles in Largo Winch II, Eternity, and Working Girls.

== Life and career ==
In 1973, with his mother Françoise van Kessel and Stanislas Defize, Philippe founded the Atelier Saint-Anne in Brussels, a café-theatre then located near the Grand Sablon. He left his theater in 1990 to run the National Theater of Belgium for fifteen years.

Philippe was a professor at INSAS and at the school of the National Theatre of Strasbourg.

He died on 11 February 2022, at the age of 76.
