= An Amazing Couple =

- Directed by: Lucas Belvaux
- Written by: Lucas Belvaux
- Produced by: Diana Elbaum; Patrick Sobelman
- Starring: Ornella Muti; François Morel; Gilbert Melki
- Cinematography: Pierre Milon
- Edited by: Valérie Loiseleux
- Music by: Riccardo del Fra
- Distributed by: Diaphana Films (France)
- Release dates: 12 September 2002 (TIFF); 1 January 2003 (France); 15 January 2003 (Belgium)
- Running time: 93 minutes
- Countries: France; Belgium
- Language: French

An Amazing Couple (French: Un couple épatant), also known as Trilogy: Two, is a 2002 French-Belgian film written and directed by Lucas Belvaux. It is the first installment of Belvaux's Trilogy, which also includes On the Run (a thriller) and After the Life (a melodrama). Each film explores a different genre while overlapping in time, characters, and events: central figures in one story appear as secondary characters in the others. Belvaux designed the trilogy so that audiences can watch each film independently or piece them together for a broader perspective, though in the UK the release order was altered, with the second film shown first.

== Plot ==
On a Friday evening, Alain Coste is delayed by his assistant Claire, who secretly steals his keys and tips off his wife Cécile when he leaves. Visiting Dr. Georges Colinet, Alain learns he has tennis elbow and must undergo minor surgery. Convinced the operation will kill him, he begins dictating paranoid wills, dividing his estate among his wife, children, Claire, and a cancer research fund.

At home, Cécile prepares a surprise birthday party, obsessively fearing Alain is in danger. Their daughter Louise and her boyfriend Henry help, while police inspector Pascal Manise drops off his wife Agnès. Alain, lost in his own neighborhood, narrowly avoids a collision with Manise, then lies to Cécile about giving Claire a ride home. At the party, a gloomy toast unsettles Alain further. Colinet privately returns Alain's keys to a mountain chalet used for an affair.

Later, Cécile catches Alain in lies. When Agnès faints, Alain uses the distraction to fake a car accident by hammering his Jaguar. Cécile, suspicious, asks Manise to tail Alain. Meanwhile Alain records imagined symptoms, updates his wills repeatedly, and grows convinced his wife plots against him. Manise surveils him, even posing as a financial policeman to question Claire. Alain uncovers that Cécile and Claire are secretly tracking his movements, rewrites his will cutting them both out, and follows Cécile to Manise's apartment, wrongly assuming an affair.

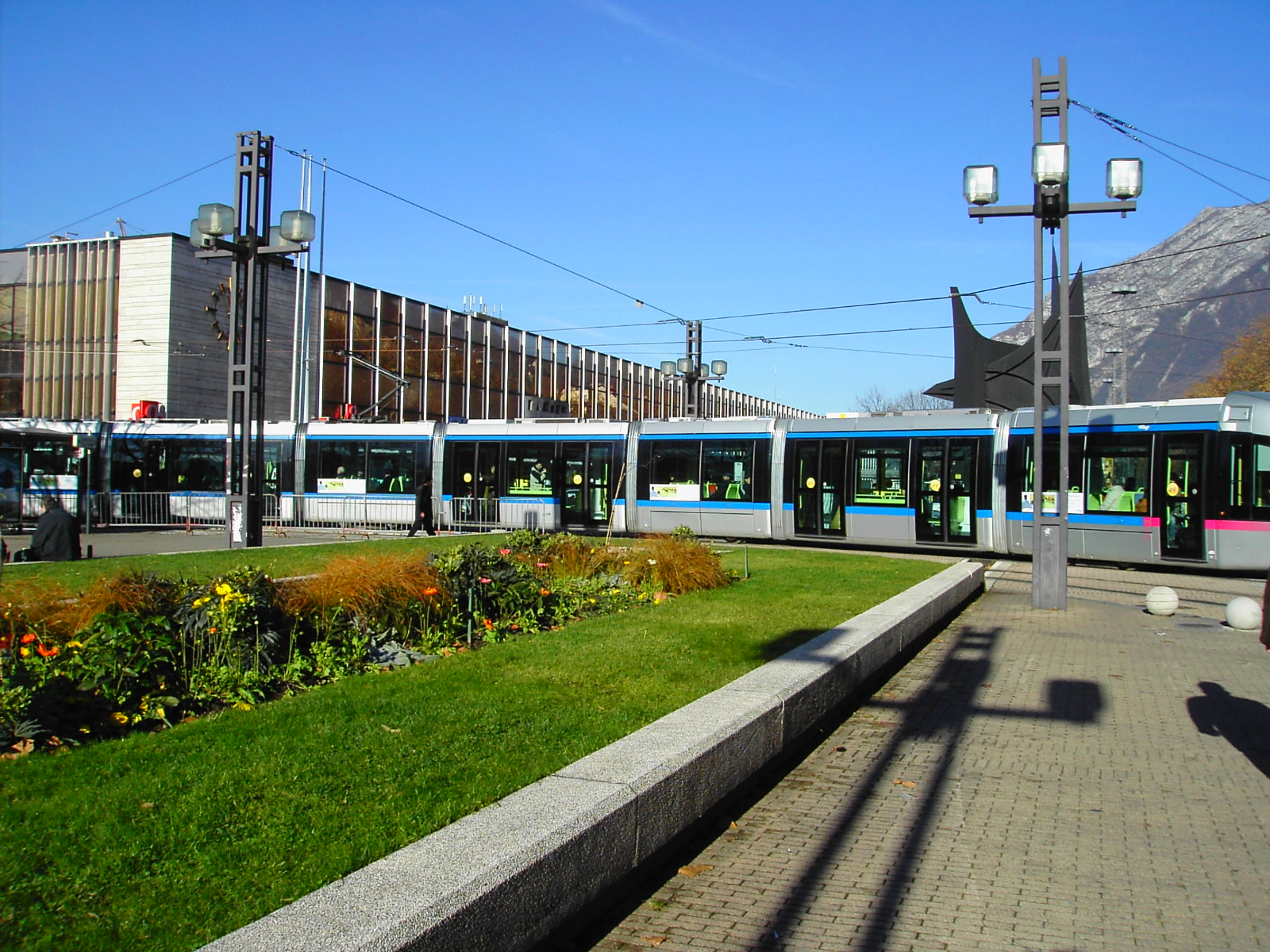
Grenoble's train station

As Alain's paranoia escalates, he beats information out of Claire, fakes trips to Paris, and repeatedly changes his testament—sometimes restoring Claire's share, sometimes increasing or reducing the cancer fund donation. He believes Cécile, Manise, Colinet, and even his children conspire to kill him, reading sinister meaning into a birthday song and every coincidence. When Alain sees Cécile near the chalet with other cars parked nearby, he imagines Mafia involvement. Meanwhile Cécile suspects Alain is hiding an affair and wrongly assumes Agnès is involved.

Manise warns Cécile to check bank accounts for clues, but nothing appears. Cécile's anger over family issues peaks when she slaps Louise, who has returned home after cheating on her boyfriend. Cécile confronts Manise and Georges separately, demanding to know Alain's whereabouts, but neither confirms anything.

Alain interrogates Claire's boyfriend Vincent, tying him to a bed, and spies on Cécile through the phone with Louise's reluctant help. He misinterprets Vincent's injuries as proof of conspiracy. Manise beats Vincent, mistaking him for a thug linked to Agnès' drug habit. Cécile learns of Agnès' addiction and of Manise's feelings for her; furious, she lashes out at him and leaves.

When Alain spots Colinet at the hospital, he attacks both Vincent and the doctor in a frenzy before orderlies restrain him. Louise calls to report that Cécile has vanished. Alain, realizing his secrecy has spiraled out of control, contacts police. Manise finds Cécile, and Alain finally explains that his erratic behavior stems from fear of dying during surgery. Cécile, reassured by Colinet that Alain's condition is not fatal, softens—but Alain secretly eavesdrops on their conversation, still unable to let go of his suspicions.

== Cast ==
- Ornella Muti as Cécile Coste, high school teacher
- François Morel as Alain Coste, an inventor
- Valérie Mairesse as Claire, Alain's PA
- Dominique Blanc as Agnès Manise, high school teacher, wife of Inspector Manise
- Gilbert Melki as Pascal Manise, police inspector
- Lucas Belvaux as Bruno Le Roux, posing as Pierre, an unemployed bump
- Catherine Frot as Jeanne Rivet, high school teacher and friend of Cécile
- Yves Claessens as Freddy, a bar owner
- Bernard Mazzinghi as George, surgeon and friend of the Costes
- Raphaële Godin as Louise Coste
- Patrick Depeyrrat as Patrick
- Vincent Colombe as Rémy Coste
- Pierre Gérard as Olivier
- Jean-Baptiste Montagut as Henri
- Anne Delol as Nurse
- Joss Philopémon as Taxi driver

== Reception ==
A. O. Scott from The New York Times wrote that "And An Amazing Couple isn't either, exactly. The film's tableau of duplicity and innocent schemes gone awry is shadowed by the grim business of On the Run and the swelling pathos of After the Life. Some of the scenes are like mislaid puzzle pieces, and they snap into place only when all three movies have been seen and absorbed. This makes watching any one of the episodes both more interesting and more frustrating than it might otherwise be, since a portion of dramatic satisfaction is always withheld". Desson Thomson of The Washington Post stated "Bruno from the first movie. In the throes of trying to kill the same gangster who supplies Agnes' heroin, he befriends Agnes. You can watch these films in any order. The joy is in watching the narrative intersections and changing your perceptions of the characters. Each movie casts light on the others. And after watching all three, a profound blending of the stories percolates in your head". Ruthe Stein from San Francisco Chronicle wrote "It's a complicated assignment Belvaux has given himself. Although he falls short of acing it, he is to be commended for experimenting with the possibilities of cinema". Jamie Russell from BBC wrote that "In the best tradition of madcap comedy, the craziness eventually reaches insane asylum levels as straitjackets and sedatives are wheeled out to cope with the manic events. Yet, for all the humour, our awareness of the darker, more dangerous world lying in wait outside the frame (the world of Trilogy 1 and, later, 3) tempers the film's energetic laughs". David Stratton from Variety wrote "'An Amazing Couple' is a completely different experience. Alain (Francois Morel) runs a small hi-tech engineering company; he is married to teacher Cecile, and they seem to be a blissfully happy couple. But Alain has come to the conclusion that he's terminally ill. A chronic worrier, he's convinced that some minor symptoms which he's experiencing are the beginning of the end. Camerawork is softer and brighter here, the editing more relaxed. The character of Bruno, who was center-stage in 'On the Run,' is seen only briefly, and introduces himself as Pierre."
