= On the Run (2003 film) =

2003 French film

- Directed by: Lucas Belvaux
- Written by: Lucas Belvaux
- Produced by: Diana Elbaum; Patrick Sobelman
- Starring: Lucas Belvaux; Catherine Frot; Ornella Muti; Gilbert Melki
- Cinematography: Pierre Milon
- Edited by: Ludo Troch
- Music by: Riccardo del Fra
- Distributed by: Diaphana Films (France)
- Release dates: 11 September 2002 (TIFF); 8 January 2003 (France); 15 January 2003 (Belgium)
- Running time: 109 minutes
- Countries: France; Belgium
- Language: French

On the Run (French: Cavale) also known as (Trilogy: One) is a 2003 film directed by, written by, and starring Lucas Belvaux.

This is the second installment of the Trilogy series. It constitutes a thriller, and is preceded by Un couple épatant, which is a comedy, and followed by Après la vie, which is a melodrama. In UK the distribution company altered the order of the trilogy placing the second film as the first one.

== Cast ==
| Actor | Role |
|---|---|
| Lucas Belvaux | Bruno Le Roux, leftist revolutionary |
| Catherine Frot | Jeanne Rivet, High school teacher and former lover of Bruno now married with Francis |
| Dominique Blanc | Agnès Manise, High school teacher, wife of Inspector Manise |
| Ornella Muti | Cécile Coste, High school teacher |
| Gilbert Melki | Pascal Manise, Police Inspector |
| Patrick Descamps | Jacquillat, a drug lord |
| Olivier Darimont | Francis |
| Alexis Tomassian | Banane, a drug dealer |
| Yves Claessens | Freddy, a bar owner |
| Christine Henkart | Madame Guiot |
| Jean-Henri Roger | Neighbour |
| Elie Belvaux | Jeanne's son |
| Hervé Livet | Jean-Jean |
| Eric Vassard | Henchman |
| Zirek | Secret Agent 1 |
| Thomas Badek | Secret Agent 2 |
| Bourlem Guerdjou | Teacher |

== Plot ==
Bruno Le Roux, a former leftist revolutionary, has just escaped from prison with the help of his accomplice Jean-Jean, who dies in the escape.

Bruno heads to Grenoble, France, where he goes into hiding. Bruno pays a visit to Freddy, a bar owner who shares some past with him. Bruno demands to see Jacquillat, a local drug lord, and Freddy reluctantly agrees to call him after offering help to take Bruno to Italy. Bruno sees a group of policemen and, assuming that Freddy has betrayed him, leaves the bar. When Freddy goes home that evening, Bruno shoots him and goes on the run again.

After a few visits to old friends, Bruno sees a drug dealer beating a woman. Bruno forces the dealer, Banane, to open his stash. The woman, Agnes, takes all she can and leaves. Bruno tells Banane he wants to meet Jacquillat. Just as he is about to leave, the woman comes back with news that the police are surrounding the place. Agnes takes Bruno to her place, where Bruno saves her from an overdose, giving his name as "Pierre."

Early in the morning, Bruno goes to Banane's and learns that a meeting with Jacquillat has been set at 2300. Agnès takes "Pierre" to a chalet in the mountains and promises him to get a car.

In the chalet, Bruno is confronted by Cécile the owner of the chalet, because Cécile thinks that her husband is having an affair with Agnès. They tell her that he is Pierre an unemployed machinist and Agnès' lover.

Bruno goes alone to the meeting which turns out to be an ambush. There is a shoot out and many are killed. Bruno escapes and calls for Jeanne to help him. She takes him to the chalet, where she demands to know that if he can justify the deaths of several innocent people that they have killed during their terrorist attacks.

The next day at the chalet, Bruno is confronted again by Cécile, who now believes that he is Agnès' dealer and the one who is blackmailing Manise. He denies it and tells her that Manise actually is a wife beater. Bruno knows he has to leave and steals a car. Once in the city, he is cut off by many police blockades. He dumps the car and goes to Jeanne's, but she is not there. When she arrives, Bruno beats Francis to force her to help him. She reveals that the police will not search her car because they are not looking for a woman with a child. Bruno has Jeanne tie Francis up and they leave her apartment with the child. They pass the blockade and he arrives at his safe house, but does not know that Jeanne has followed him. She tells the police where to find Bruno.

Le Roux hears movements outside his hideout and escapes to Jacquillat's office, where he shoots Jacquillat and takes his car. He goes back to the chalet and starts climbing the Alps in order to escape to Italy, but on the top of a mountain he walks into a crevasse and sinks to the bottom.

== Reception ==
Mark Kermode from The Guardian favorably compared the film to Kill Bill: Volume 1 and called it "a first class first installment for Trilogy, and a tough act to follow for Two and Three, whose central characters we have now met and wish to know better."

Ted Shen from Chicago Reader gave a favorable review, saying, "The plot is intricate (partly because it can’t afford continuity gaps in the intersecting lives), especially in laying out Bruno’s methodical revenge and subsequent getaway. Behind the camera, Belvaux builds suspense with an austere tone and clever false alarms; in front of it he plays Bruno as chivalrous yet ruthless. The least convincing element here is Bruno’s political worldview."

David Stratton from Variety spoke well of the film's opening: "Escape sequence is dynamically directed, with the camera placed in the getaway car that careens through the nighttime streets until stopped by a police road-black, whereupon all hell breaks loose.

A. O. Scott of The New York Times was less complimentary: "On the Run, the supposed thriller, is more numbing than thrilling...The movie seems to be aiming for the Zenlike deliberateness that Jean-Pierre Melville showed in transcendent policiers like Le Samouraï and Le Cercle Rouge, but without the necessary rigor or wit."
