= Little Lili =

- Directed by: Claude Miller
- Written by: Julien Boivent; Anton Chekhov; Claude Miller
- Produced by: Annie Miller
- Starring: Ludivine Sagnier; Jean-Pierre Marielle
- Cinematography: Gérard de Battista
- Edited by: Véronique Lange
- Distributed by: Pyramide Distribution
- Release date: 27 August 2003
- Running time: 104 minutes
- Country: France
- Language: French
- Budget: $5.8 million
- Box office: $3.1 million

Little Lili (French: La petite Lili) is a 2003 French drama film directed by Claude Miller. The film stars Ludivine Sagnier, Bernard Giraudeau, Nicole Garcia, Julie Depardieu and Jean-Pierre Marielle.

== Plot ==
The plot is based on the 1896 stage play The Seagull by Anton Chekhov.

A group of cinematics spend a holiday in the French countryside. The film provides insight into their relationships, including that between a young man, Julien, and a local girl, Lili. Lili uses the opportunity to work her way into the cinematic world. She transfers her attentions from Julien to his mother's lover, an established filmmaker, who takes Lili on a trip to Paris.

A few years later Julien has become a filmmaker himself. His first film is inspired by the holiday with Lili. Lili, who is by now an established actress, learns about it and works herself into its cast, becoming the star of the production. However she does not resume her personal relationship with Julien, who remains faithful to his wife and young daughter.

== Cast ==
- Nicole Garcia as Mado Marceaux
- Bernard Giraudeau as Brice
- Jean-Pierre Marielle as Simon Marceaux
- Ludivine Sagnier as Lili
- Robinson Stévenin as Julien Marceaux
- Julie Depardieu as Jeanne-Marie
- Yves Jacques as Serge
- Anne Le Ny as Léone
- Marc Betton as Guy
- Michel Piccoli as Actor Who Plays Simon
- Maylie Del Piero
- Mathieu Grondin as Julien-Acteur
- Louise Boisvert as Actress Who Plays Léone

== Awards and nominations ==
- Cannes Film Festival (France)
  - Nominated: Golden Palm (Claude Miller)
- Chicago Film Festival (USA)
  - Won: Silver Hugo - Best Female Performance (Ludivine Sagnier)
- César Awards (France)
  - Won: Best Actress – Supporting Role (Julie Depardieu)
  - Won: Most Promising Actress (Julie Depardieu)
  - Nominated: Best Actor – Supporting Role (Jean-Pierre Marielle)
  - Nominated: Best Director (Claude Miller)
