= Not on the Lips =

Not on the Lips (Pas sur la bouche)
- Theatrical release poster
- Directed by: Alain Resnais
- Written by: André Barde (original libretto)
- Produced by: Bruno Pésery
- Starring: Sabine Azéma; Isabelle Nanty; Audrey Tautou; Pierre Arditi; Darry Cowl; Jalil Lespert; Daniel Prévost; Lambert Wilson
- Cinematography: Renato Berta
- Edited by: Hervé de Luze
- Music by: Maurice Yvain (original score); Bruno Fontaine (orchestration and additional music)
- Distributed by: Pathé Distribution
- Release date: 3 December 2003
- Running time: 115 minutes
- Countries: France; Switzerland
- Language: French
- Budget: $12.6 million
- Box office: $4.1 million

Not on the Lips (French: Pas sur la bouche) is a 2003 French musical film directed by Alain Resnais. It is an adaptation of the operetta Pas sur la bouche, written by André Barde and Maurice Yvain, which was first produced in Paris in 1925.

== Plot ==
Act 1. Gilberte Valandray (Sabine Azéma) is the socialite wife of rich Parisian businessman Georges Valandray (Pierre Arditi) from whom she has concealed a previous but unvalidated marriage in America, being aware of her husband's belief in the indissolubility of a relationship based on a first sexual experience. Only her spinster sister Arlette (Isabelle Nanty) knows the secret. Secure in her husband's confidence in her, Gilberte now encourages a circle of amorous admirers, as flirts but nothing more, including Faradel (Daniel Prévost), a middle-aged dilettante, and Charley (Jalil Lespert), a young avant-garde artist who is also pursued by Gilberte's young friend Huguette (Audrey Tautou). Gilberte is then aghast to discover that her husband has invited to dinner an American, Eric Thomson (Lambert Wilson), with whom he is about to sign a deal, and who is none other than her first husband. With embarrassment Gilberte appeals to the truculent Eric to preserve her secret.

Act 2. Ten days later, at a soirée at the Valandrays' house, preparations are in hand for a performance of Charley's new play "Âmes primitives", set in Mexico. Eric is considering whether to renew his marital claims upon Gilberte, who seeks to deter him by demonstrating that Charley is her lover. Faradel offers the use of his bachelor flat to Charley who invites Huguette there - and Gilberte. Meanwhile Eric, who is about to take over the lease of the same flat himself, gives the address to Georges.

Act 3. The following afternoon, all the characters arrive under different pretexts at Faradel's bachelor flat, to the bemusement of the concierge Madame Foin (Darry Cowl). Just as Georges thinks he has discovered his wife's secret, Arlette declares that it was she who was Eric's first wife and now they are reconciled - and Eric upholds the lie, delightedly overcoming his longstanding horror of being kissed on the lips. Meanwhile Charley has been happily seduced by Huguette, and Georges and Gilberte are restored to peace of mind.

== Production ==
Resnais's film is a faithful adaptation of the operetta by Barde and Yvain. Its original dialogue was retained, even when outdated, and characters are unchanged except in one instance (Arlette); four of the original musical numbers were omitted because they were felt to slow up the action. Orchestration and some additional music was provided by Bruno Fontaine. In selecting his cast, Resnais was insistent that he wanted actors who sang rather than singers who acted, and several of his regular collaborators (Azéma, Arditi, Wilson) appear. The songs were recorded first and the film was then shot with the actors performing to a play-back. Resnais circulated Lubitsch's 1925 (silent) adaptation of Lady Windermere's Fan among his cast to intimate the tone of the film that he wanted.

The entire film was shot in a studio (in Arpajon). Jacques Saulnier, another of Resnais's longtime collaborators, provided elegant and sumptuous set designs, which together with the glamorous costumes designed by Jackie Budin complement the theatrical style of the acting, and frequent use of long camera shots enable a fluid staging of the musical numbers. Various cinematic devices are used both to intensify the characterizations (especially with close-ups and direct-to-camera asides), but also to distance the film spectator from the theatrical experience (e.g. dissolves to achieve characters' exits, overhead camera shots for some of the ensemble numbers).

A set of four trailers for the film was made, in which André Dussollier, another regular actor for Resnais, complains that he has been passed over for various roles in this film; these were directed by Bruno Podalydès.

== Reception ==
The film was notable for the polarised reactions which it produced among different audiences when it was released. In France it was a respectable success with the public (642,693 admissions). The response of the French press was predominantly enthusiastic, with many awarding it a high rating, even if they admitted to a sense of guilt at enjoying something so unfashionable. The film was also nominated for a number of awards in France (see below).

A very different reaction was expressed when the film appeared in Great Britain, where the apparent frivolity of an old-fashioned musical comedy presented by a director previously known for intellectual seriousness caused indignation and incomprehension. "An inert, sclerotic piece of nonsense with unendurably mannered performances", "a flavourless adaptation... banal lyrics... philistine jokes about the arts...", "laboriously frothy", and "excruciatingly embarrassing" were among the typical responses of British reviewers. Elsewhere however it was pointed out that over the previous 20 years Resnais had repeatedly demonstrated his cinematic engagement with various forms of popular culture (the strip-cartoon in I Want to Go Home, boulevard theatre in Mélo, the popular song in On connaît la chanson), and that here again he was doing same for Parisian operetta with genuine affection, and without adopting "the posture of a high-art auteur bending down to, or 'reworking', a popular genre". Referring to the use of anachronistic devices, the same reviewer noted that "part of the attraction is also in [the film's] distanced nature - the modernist director has not entirely disappeared".

In the USA, the film did not achieve a commercial release, and apart from a few restricted theatrical screenings it only became generally available when it was issued on DVD (2005). It did however attract a few appreciative reviews. One indirectly addressed the charge that the film was outdated: "Alain Resnais's dazzling madcap musical ... makes the grim preoccupations of a younger generation appear rather conventional". Another reinforced the point that the film was "a buoyantly entertaining example of everything old made new again. ...It's glamorous, funny, suspenseful, anchored in human nature and profoundly silly all at once". One of the strongest defences of the film was made by Jonathan Rosenbaum, who concluded with the following description: "an elegant, funny, creepy, soulful, and formally exquisite period operetta that demonstrates a keen sense of how suffocating polite society can be and how persistent desire is in spite of it. In short, the key themes of the Surrealist movement".

== Accolades ==
Pas sur la bouche was nominated for nine César awards, including best film and best director; it won three of them (for best sound, best costumes, and best supporting actor, Darry Cowl).

The film also won the Étoile d'or (2004) for best film (awarded by the Academy of French film journalists).

Alain Resnais won the Prix Lumière (2004) for best director (awarded by the international press in Paris).

== Alternative titles ==
The North American DVD was released under the title Not on the Lips. In the UK the film was released in cinemas under its French title. The French DVD release uses on its cover the original artwork from the film's publicity material, illustrating in cartoon-style the title and a scene from the film.

== Other versions ==
An earlier adaptation of Pas sur la bouche was made in 1931, directed by Nicolas Evreinoff and Nicolas Rimsky.
