= Riccardo Del Fra =

Italian jazz bassist and composer (born 1956)

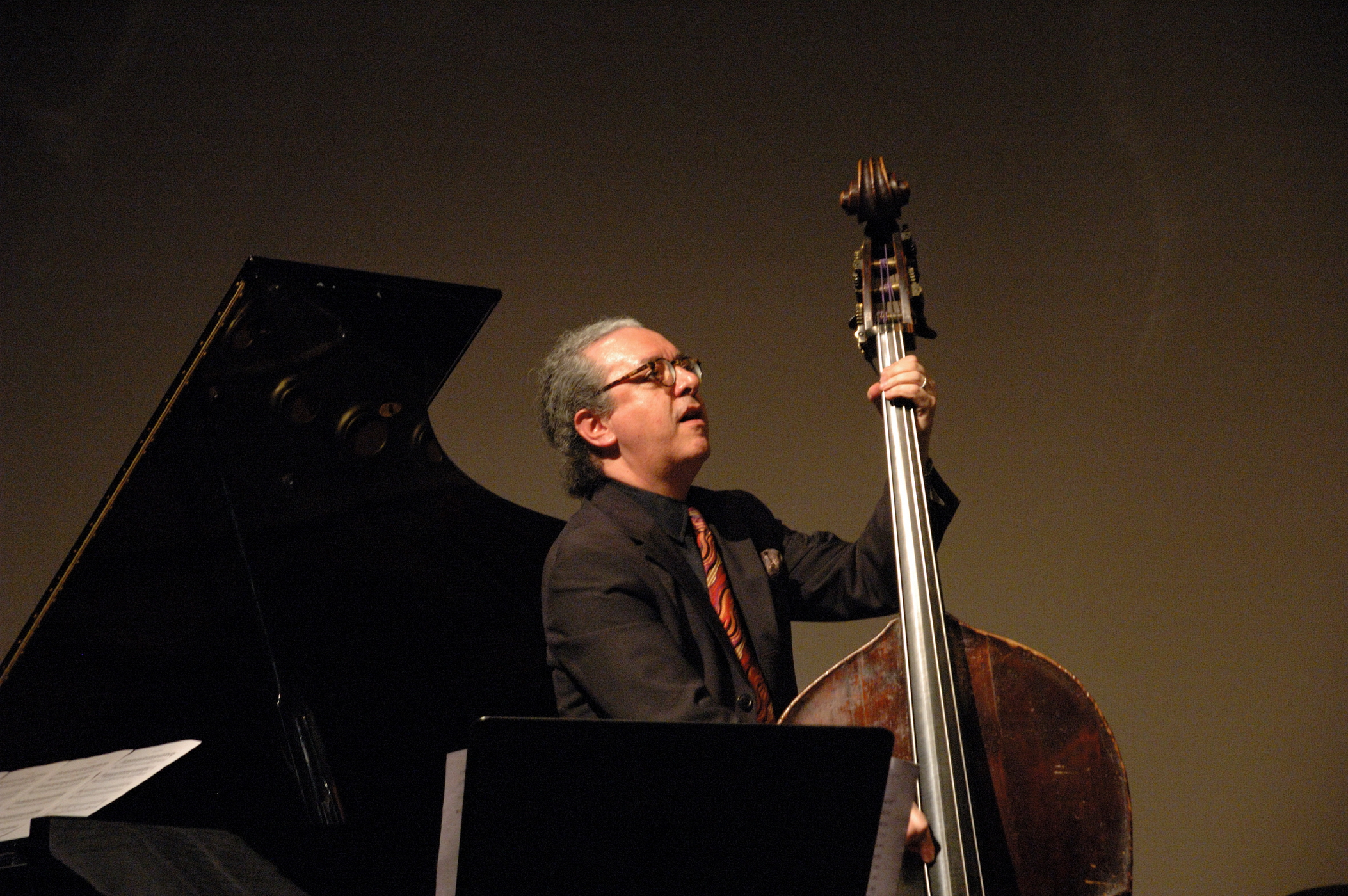
- Del Fra at Cinémathèque française in 2008

Background information
- Born: 20 February 1956 (age 70); Rome, Italy
- Occupations: Musician; bandleader; composer; arranger
- Instrument: Double bass
- Years active: 1970s–present

Riccardo Del Fra (born 20 February 1956 in Rome) is an Italian jazz double bassist, bandleader, composer and arranger.

Del Fra first played the guitar, then switched to double bass when at age 16. He studied at a conservatory, played in the RAI National Symphony Orchestra and worked as a studio musician for film scores in the 1970s. Concomitantly, he began playing as a sideman in jazz venues in Rome for touring musicians, such as Art Blakey, Art Farmer and Kai Winding. He joined Enrico Pieranunzi's ensemble in the late 1970s and played with Chet Baker; Del Fra and Baker played together frequently thereafter until Baker's death.

Del Fra eventually moved to Paris, where he worked in a trio setting with Alain Jean-Marie and Al Levitt and played local clubs as the backing band for visiting Americans. He also worked with Charles Loos, Barney Wilen, Lee Konitz, Joe Diorio and Bob Brookmeyer in the 1980s and 1990s.

== Discography ==
- Chet Baker Trio, Mr. B (Timeless, 1983)
- Chet Baker Trio Live at Ronnie Scott's (Jazzdor, 1986; Wadham Film – Hendring, 1986 [DVD])
- Chet Baker Quartet, Chet Baker Sings Again (Timeless, 1986)
- La Note Bleue (IDA, 1986) with Barney Wilen
- French Ballads (IDA, 1987) with Barney Wilen
- A Sip of Your Touch (IDA, 1989)
- Sorserez (1995) with Jacques Pellen
- Bob Brookmeyer New Quartet, Paris Suite (Challenge, 1995)
- Double Take (RAM, 1998) with Joe Diorio
- Voulouz Loar – Velluto di Luna (GWP, 1998) with Annie Ebrel
- Soft Talk (Sketch, 2000) with Michel Graillier
- Overnight (Sketch, 2002) with John Taylor and Kenny Wheeler
- Empreintes (Sketch, 2003) with Bruno Angelini and Ichirō Onoe
- Roses and Roots (Nocturne, 2005) with Bruno Ruder, Sylvain Rifflet and Joey Baron
- John Ruocco, Am I Asking Too Much (Pirouet, 2008) with John Taylor
- Sky Changes (Jazzheads, 2012) with Dave Liebman, Benjamin von Gutzeit and the Manhattan School of Music Chamber Jazz Ensemble & Tactus
- My Chet My Song (Cristal, 2014) with Airelle Besson, Pierrick Pedron, Bruno Ruder and Billy Hart
- Moving People (Cristal, 2018) with Kurt Rosenwinkel, Tomasz Dąbrowski, Jan Prax, Rémi Fox, Carl-Henri Morisset and Jason Brown
- Chet Visions (Cristal, 2019)
