= Lucas Belvaux =

Belgian actor and film director

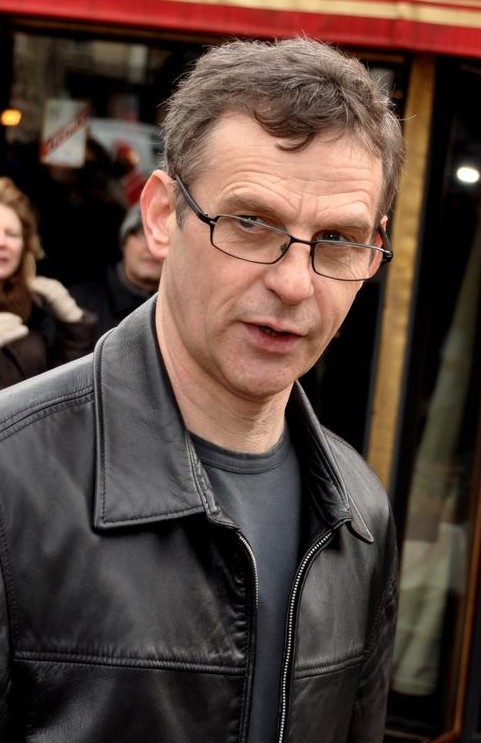
- Lucas Belvaux in 2013
- Born: 14 November 1961 (age 64); Namur, Belgium
- Occupations: Actor, film director, screenwriter
- Years active: 1980–present

Lucas Belvaux (French: [lyka bɛlvo]; born 14 November 1961) is a Belgian actor and film director. His directing credits include the Trilogie, consisting of three films with interlocking stories and characters, each of which was filmed in a different genre. The three films are Cavale, a thriller; Un couple épatant, a comedy; and Après la vie, a melodrama. The Trilogie received the André Cavens Award. His film La Raison du plus faible was entered into the 2006 Cannes Film Festival. His film One Night (38 témoins) was nominated for seven Magritte Awards, winning Best Screenplay.

He also appeared as an actor in the film Merry Christmas (2005). He is the brother of Rémy Belvaux and Bruno Belvaux.

== Filmography ==
=== As director/writer ===
Year	Title	Box office	Notes
1992	Parfois trop d'amour		
1996	Pour rire !	$1.5 million	Thessaloniki International Film Festival – Best Screenplay; Nominated – Thessaloniki International Film Festival – Golden Alexander; Nominated – Torino Film Festival – Best Feature Film
2001	Mère de toxico		TV movie
2002	Trilogy: Cavale; Un couple épatant Après la vie	$5 million	Belgian Film Critics Association Award for Best Film; French Syndicate of Cinema Critics – Best Film; Louis Delluc Prize – Best Film; Étoiles d'Or – Best Director; Nominated – César Award for Best Director; Nominated – César Award for Best Original Screenplay or Adaptation; Nominated – Joseph Plateau Award for Best Belgian Director; Nominated – Valladolid International Film Festival – Golden Spike
2004	Nature contre nature		TV movie
2006	The Right of the Weakest	$1.4 million	Nominated – Cannes Film Festival – Palme d'Or
2007	Les prédateurs		TV series (2 Episodes)
2009	Rapt	$5.5 million	Nominated – César Award for Best Film; Nominated – César Award for Best Director; Nominated – CPH:PIX – Politiken's Audience Award
2012	One Night	$3.3 million	Magritte Award for Best Screenplay; Nominated – César Award for Best Adaptation; Nominated – Magritte Award for Best Film; Nominated – Magritte Award for Best Director
2014	Not My Type	$2.6 million	Magritte Award for Best Screenplay; Nominated – César Award for Best Adaptation; Nominated – Lumière Award for Best Film; Nominated – Lumière Award for Best Director; Nominated – Magritte Award for Best Film; Nominated – Magritte Award for Best Director; Nominated – Trophees Francophones du Cinema – Best Feature Film
2017	This Is Our Land		Nominated – Magritte Award for Best Film; Nominated – Magritte Award for Best Director; Nominated – Magritte Award for Best Screenplay
2020	Home Front		

=== As actor ===
- 1981: Allons Z'Enfants
- 1982: The Trout
- 1983: The Death of Mario Ricci
- 1985: Chicken with Vinegar
- 1985: Hurlevent
- 1991: Madame Bovary
- 2004: Tomorrow We Move
