= Nina Meurisse =

French actress

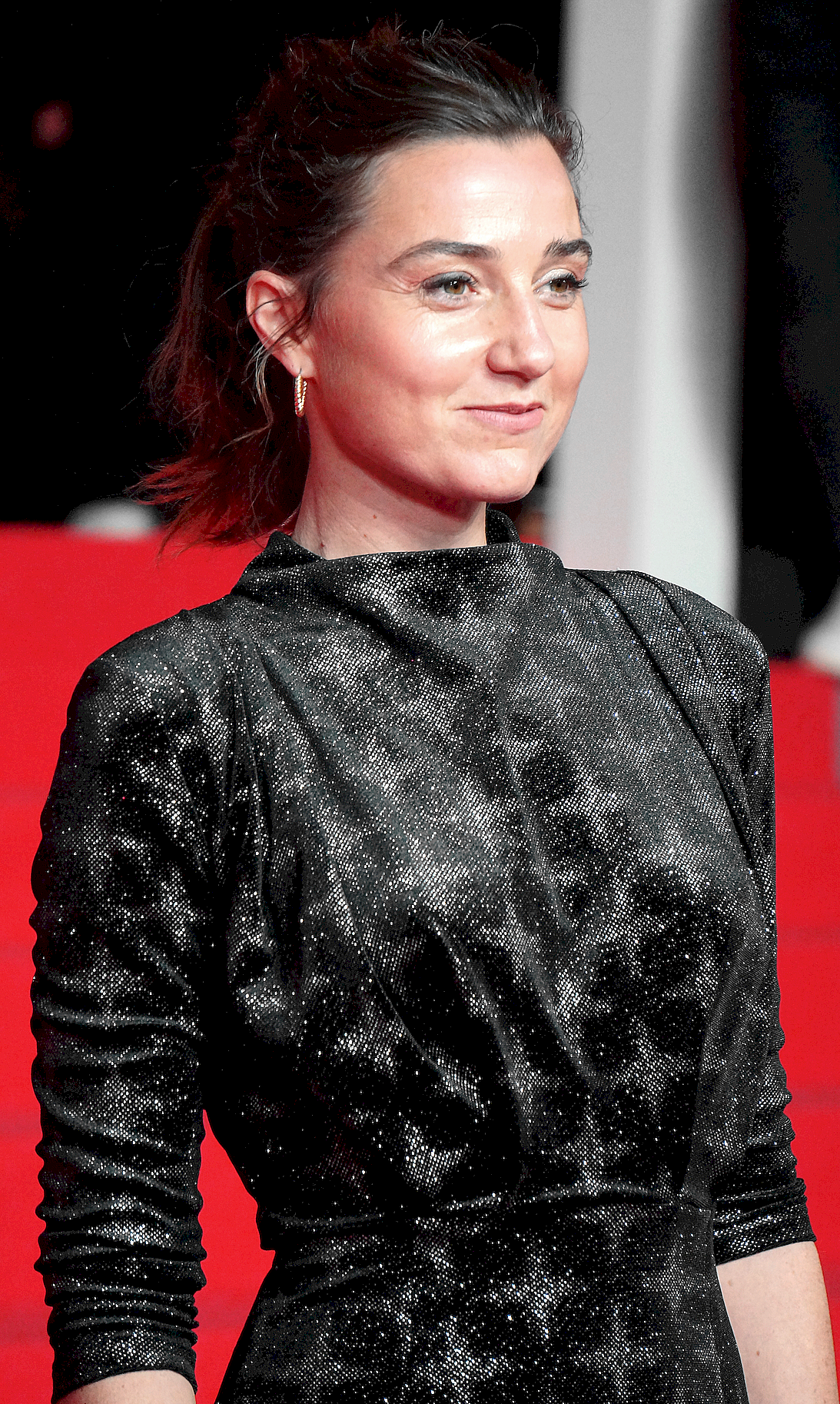
- Nina Meurisse at the 2025 Film Fest Gent.
- Born: 14 November 1988 (age 37); Caen, Calvados, France
- Occupation: Actress
- Years active: 2000–present

Nina Meurisse (born 14 November 1988) is a French actress. For her role in Souleymane's Story, she won the Cesar Award for Best Supporting Actress.

== Theater ==
Year	Title	Author	Director
2008	Les Trente Millions de Gladiator	Eugène Labiche & Philippe Gille	Hervé Van Der Meulen
2009	La Boîte à joujoux	Jean-Marc Hoolbecq	Jean-Marc Hoolbecq & Hervé Van Der Meulen
2010	Il n’y a plus d’après... il n’y a plus qu’aujourd’hui !	Yveline Hamon	Yveline Hamon
2014	Archipel Marie N’Diaye	Marie NDiaye	Georges Lavaudant
2016	Archipel Marie N’Diaye	Marie NDiaye	Georges Lavaudant
2017–18	Cuisine et dépendances & Family Resemblances	Agnès Jaoui & Jean-Pierre Bacri	Agnès Jaoui
2019–22	L’Absence de père	Lorraine de Sagazan & Guillaume Poix	Lorraine de Sagazan

== Filmography ==
=== Cinema ===
Year	Title	Role	Director	Notes
2000	The King's Daughters	Lucie de Fontenelle	Patricia Mazuy	
2003	L'escalier	Rachel	Frédéric Mermoud	Short
2004	Fausse teinte	Léa	Marie Guiraud	Short
2006	Rachel	Rachel	Frédéric Mermoud	Short
2007	Maël fume	The football girl	François Brunet	Short
2007	La vie d'Anaïs	Anaïs	Arnaud Gautier	Short
2009	Les Causses	The appearance	Aurélien Pallier-Colinot	Short
2010	Accomplices	Rebecca Legendre	Frédéric Mermoud	
2011	Léa	Sonia	Bruno Rolland	
2011	Twiggy	The midwife	Emmanuelle Millet	
2012	Mains armées	Juliette	Pierre Jolivet	
2013	Crawl	Gwen	Hervé Lasgouttes	
2013	Juliette	Lou	Pierre Godeau	
2013	Under the Rainbow	Clémence	Agnès Jaoui	
2013	Bonne poire		Marie Belhomme	Short
2014	Avanti	Léa	Emmanuelle Antille	
2014	Lulu femme nue	Virginie	Sólveig Anspach	
2014	Un conte de la Goutte d'or	Ernestine	Dyana Gaye	Short
2015	Africaine	Géraldine	Stéphanie Girerd	
2015	I Am a Soldier	Audrey	Laurent Larivière	
2015	Les chaises musicales	Solène	Marie Belhomme	
2015	Vincent n'a pas d'écailles	Lucie's friend	Thomas Salvador	
2015	Naturally		Lucie Clayssen	Short
2015	Gueule de loup	Jeanne	Alice Vial	Short
2015	Le jour du marché	Ophélie	Brigitte Lo Cicero	Short
2015	Jeunesse des loups-garous	Julie	Yann Delattre	Short
2016	A Woman's Life	Rosalie	Stéphane Brizé	
2016	The Aquatic Effect	The drowned girl	Sólveig Anspach	
2016	Ruptures	Sophie	Francisco Bianchi	Short
2017	Mad	Madeleine	Sophie Tavert Macian	Short
2017	Il était une fois mon prince viendra	Luna	Lola Naymark	Short
2018	Place publique	Nina Mareuil Castro	Agnès Jaoui	
2019	Camille	Julie	Yann Delattre, Cécile Ducrocq, ...	
2019	French Touch: Mixed Feelings	Camille Lepage	Boris Lojkine	
2020	Un gros poisson	Lucie	Yann Delattre	Short
2021	Petite Maman	The mother	Céline Sciamma	
2023	Cash	Béatrice Breuil	Jérémie Rozan	
2023	The Rapture	Salomé	Iris Kaltenbäck	
2023	Les algues vertes	Judith	Pierre Jolivet	
2024	Souleymane's Story	L'agente de l'OFPRA	Boris Lojkine	
2025	Julian	Fleur	Cato Kusters	

=== Television ===
Year	Title	Role	Director	Notes
2003	Des épaules solides	Dani	Ursula Meier	TV movie
2010	Mon père, Francis le Belge	Cathy	Frédéric Balekdjian	TV movie
2011	Cigarettes et bas nylon	Yvonne	Fabrice Cazeneuve	TV movie
2013	Mon ami Pierrot	The teacher	Orso Miret	TV movie
2015	Virage Nord	Jessica	Virginie Sauveur	TV mini-series
2016	Accused	Eva	Julien Despaux	TV series (1 episode)
2017	The Frozen Dead	Diane Berg	Laurent Herbiet	TV mini-series
2021	Voltaire High	Camille Couret	Alexandre Castagnetti & Édouard Salier	TV series (8 episodes)
2023	Tout va bien	The psychologist	Audrey Estrougo, Xavier Legrand, ...	TV mini-series
2023	BRI	Nina Perez	Jérémie Guez	TV series (6 episodes)
2023	Dark Hearts	Sabrina	Ziad Doueiri	TV series (6 episodes)
2024	La Fièvre	Sam Berger	Ziad Doueiri	TV series (6 episodes)
