= Anne Alvaro =

French actress

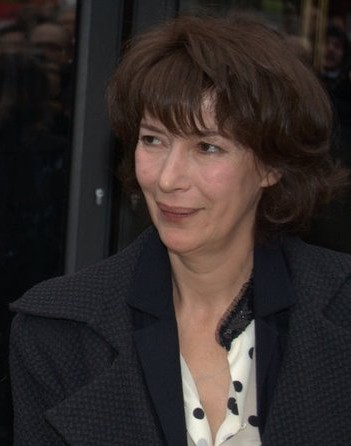
- Anne Alvaro in 2011
- Born: 29 October 1951 (age 73); Oran, French Algeria
- Occupation: Actress
- Years active: 1973–present

Anne Alvaro (born 29 October 1951) is a French actress whose work spans from the early 1970s through to 2012. She is probably best known for her role as Eleonore in the 1983 biopic Danton. She won one César Award for Best Actress in a Supporting Role for The Taste of Others in 2001 and another for The Clink of Ice in 2011.

Alvaro has also appeared in televised films, play adaptations, and series. In 2010, she appeared in a recurring role during the third season of the hit French TV drama, Engrenages.

== Filmography ==
Year	Title	Role	Director	Notes
1973	Magie rouge	Sybilla	Daniel Georgeot	TV movie
1978	Les procès témoins de leur temps	Margaretha	Jean Cazenave	TV series (1 episode)
1983	Danton	Éléonore Duplay	Andrzej Wajda	
1983	La java des ombres	Maria	Romain Goupil	
1983	City of Pirates	Isidore	Raúl Ruiz	
1983	Bérénice	Bérénice	Raúl Ruiz (2)	
1984	Point de fuite		Raúl Ruiz (3)	
1985	Visage de chien	Monique	Jacek Gasiorowski	
1985	Régime sans pain	Alouette	Raúl Ruiz (4)	
1986	Faire la fête		Anne-Marie Miéville	Short
1986	Dans un miroir		Raúl Ruiz (5)	
1987	Venise sauvée		André Engel	
1988	La lumière du lac	Madame Pallaci	Francesca Comencini	
1989	Le goût de plaire	Hélène	Olivier Ducastel	Short
1990	Les chevaliers de la table ronde	Lancelot's mother	Denis Llorca	
1993	Rupture(s)		Christine Citti	
1993	Une vue imprenable		Amal Bedjaoui	Short
1994	Jules	Judith	Christian Palligiano	TV movie
1996	Der schrei der seide	Rosemonde Burel	Yvon Marciano	
1998	Le serpent a mangé la grenouille		Alain Guesnier	
1999	À mort la mort!	Florence	Romain Goupil (2)	
1999	Elle grandit si vite		Anne Théron	Short
2000	The Taste of Others	Clara Devaux	Agnès Jaoui	César Award for Best Supporting Actress
2001	Chante	Henriette	Fabrice Main	Short
2003	La chose publique	Julia	Mathieu Amalric	TV movie
2004	Qui songe à la douceur?		Isabelle Coudrier-Kleist	Short
2006	Indépendance		Fabrice Main (2)	Short
2006	Sartre, l'âge des passions	Simone de Beauvoir	Claude Goretta	TV movie
2007	La part animale	Brigitte Chaumier	Sébastien Jaudeau	
2007	The Diving Bell and the Butterfly	Betty	Julian Schnabel	
2007	Let's Dance	Marie-Hélène	Noémie Lvovsky	
2008	Scalp	The psychologue	Jean-Marc Brondolo, Xavier Durringer	TV series (8 episodes)
2008	Les bureaux de Dieu	Doctor Marianne	Claire Simon	
2010	Spiral	Isabelle Ledoré	Manuel Boursinhac, Jean-Marc Brondolo (2)	TV series (7 episodes)
2010	The Clink of Ice	Louisa	Bertrand Blier	César Award for Best Supporting Actress
2011	Quand la guerre sera loin	The Duchess	Olivier Schatzky	TV movie
2012	Camille Rewinds	The English teacher	Noémie Lvovsky (2)	
2013	There Will Come a Day	Anna	Giorgio Diritti	
2013	Mr. Morgan's Last Love	Colette Léry	Sandra Nettelbeck	
2014	Yves Saint Laurent	Marie-Louise Bousquet	Jalil Lespert	
2014	L'homme qui avait perdu la tête	Marielle	Fred Joyeux	Short
2015	Les Bêtises	Élise	Rose and Alice Philippon	
2023	A Place to Fight For	Chantal	Romain Cogitore	
