= Bonitzer =

Bonitzer is a surname. Notable people with the surname include:

- Agathe Bonitzer (born 1989), French actress
- Pascal Bonitzer (born 1946), French screenwriter, film director and actor
