= Crescendo (2026 film) =

2026 film by Agnès Jaoui

- French theatrical release poster
- French: L'Objet du délit
- Directed by: Agnès Jaoui
- Written by: Agnès Jaoui
- Produced by: François Kraus; Denis Pineau-Valencienne
- Starring: Agnès Jaoui; Daniel Auteuil; Eye Haïdara
- Cinematography: David Chizallet
- Edited by: Christel Dewynter
- Music by: Fernando Fiszbein
- Production companies: Les Films du Kiosque; StudioCanal; France 2 Cinéma; Versus Production; Proximus; BeTV; Orange
- Distributed by: StudioCanal (France); O'Brother Distribution (Belgium)
- Release dates: 22 May 2026 (Cannes); 27 May 2026 (France)
- Running time: 133 minutes
- Countries: France; Belgium
- Language: French

Crescendo (French: L'Objet du délit) is a 2026 comedy-drama film written and directed by Agnès Jaoui. It stars Jaoui, Daniel Auteuil, Eye Haïdara, Claire Chust and Oussama Kheddam. The plot follows an opera production rocked by an allegation of sexual assault.

The film had its world premiere out of competition at the 79th Cannes Film Festival on 22 May 2026, and will be released theatrically in France by StudioCanal on 27 May.

== Premise ==
An allegation of sexual assault derails a production of The Marriage of Figaro.

== Cast ==
- Agnès Jaoui as Hannah
- Daniel Auteuil as Igor
- Eye Haïdara as Cora
- Claire Chust as Mirabelle
- Oussama Kheddam as Samir
- Lucie Gallo as Clothilde
- Tiphaine Daviot as Sophie / Suzanne
- Maxime Pambet as Baptiste / Figaro
- Loïc Legendre as Gildas
- Vincenzo Amato as Piazzoni / Comte Almaviva
- Patrick Mille as Poirier
- Hervé Pierre as Pastourel
- Emmanuel Salinger as Samuel
- Jacques Weber

== Production ==
Crescendo is Agnès Jaoui's first film as director since the death of her longtime partner and co-writer, Jean-Pierre Bacri. Jaoui wrote the film's screenplay, with Emmanuel Salinger, Laurent Jaoui, Noé Debré and Florence Seyvos credited as collaborating writers. The plot originated from Jaoui's desire to share her love of opera with audiences as well as "her experiences as an actress and director in a male-dominated industry". The film was also inspired by the MeToo movement and was officially described as being "about how everyone involved responds to allegations of assault depending on their age, sex and positions within the production."

Principal photography began on 19 May 2025 under the working title Au temps pour nous, with shooting taking place at the ruined Château de Lacoste in Lacoste, Vaucluse, which was once owned by the Marquis de Sade. Shooting also took place in Paris. Filming wrapped on 7 July 2025. The production benefited from a training program used to avoid incidents of sexual assault, led by the Centre national du cinéma et de l'image animée (CNC). Jaoui has also described the filming as a meta experience, saying, "There were people who came to set to educate us for hours. In the film, there are also scenes where everyone gets together to talk about what transpired."

Jaoui, who plays the role of a renowned opera singer, sings in the film but her voice is mixed with that of soprano Julia Beaumier. The film also includes real opera singers as part of the cast.

The film was produced by François Kraus and Denis Pineau-Valencienne at Les Films du Kiosque, in co-production with StudioCanal, France 2 Cinéma and the Belgian company Versus Production, alongside co-production by Proximus and BeTV-Orange.

== Release ==
Crescendo was selected to be screened out of competition at the 79th Cannes Film Festival, where it had its world premiere on 22 May 2026.

International sales are handled by StudioCanal, which is also set to theatrically release the film in France on 27 May 2026. O'Brother Distribution is set to distribute the film in Belgium.
