= Régime sans pain =

1985 film

- Film poster
- Directed by: Raúl Ruiz
- Written by: Raúl Ruiz
- Produced by: Jacque Blanc; Georges Lavaudant
- Starring: Anne Alvaro
- Cinematography: Acácio de Almeida
- Edited by: Martine Bouquin
- Release date: 1985
- Running time: 75 minutes
- Country: France
- Language: French

Régime sans pain is a 1985 French musical fantasy film directed by Chilean filmmaker Raúl Ruiz.

== Cast ==
- Anne Alvaro as Alouette
- Olivier Angèle as Jason
- Gérard Maimone as Professeur Pie
- Gilles Arbona
- Marc Betton
- Jean-Marie Boëglin
- David Bursztein
- Jean-Noël Cassara
- Philippe Morier-Genoud
- Annie Perret
- Marie-Paule Trystram
- Jacques Wenger
