= Marie-Louise Bousquet =

French fashion journalist and Harper's Bazaar editor (1885–1975)

Marie-Louise Bousquet (née Vallantin; 29 September 1885 – 13 October 1975) was a French fashion journalist and former Paris editor of Harper's Bazaar. She is credited with being one of the first to recognise the potential of Christian Dior in 1938, introducing him to Carmel Snow who in 1947, would be instrumental in publicising Dior's first couture collection.

She was born in Paris. She married the playwright Jacques Bousquet (1883–1939). In 1918, the Bousquets launched a salon from their Paris apartment which, every Thursday, brought together a meeting of creative minds such as Pablo Picasso, Aldous Huxley, and Carmel Snow. Thursday evenings at the Bousquets' apartment at 3 Place du Palais-Bourbon were still renowned as a "rallying point for persons of cosmopolitan quality" in 1966.

While she had been affiliated with Harper's since 1937, Bousquet was only officially made Paris editor in 1946. As someone who had significant personal influence on fashion, Bousquet received the Neiman Marcus Fashion Award in 1956.

Bousquet died at the age of 88 in Paris on October 13, 1975.

In the 2014 biopic Yves Saint Laurent, Bousquet was played by Anne Alvaro.
