= The Clink of Ice =

- Film poster
- Le Bruit des glaçons
- Directed by: Bertrand Blier
- Written by: Bertrand Blier
- Produced by: David Poirot
- Starring: Jean Dujardin; Albert Dupontel
- Cinematography: François Catonné
- Edited by: Marion Monestier
- Production company: Thelma Films
- Distributed by: Wild Bunch Distribution
- Release date: 25 August 2010
- Running time: 87 minutes
- Country: France
- Language: French
- Budget: $6.6 million
- Box office: $5.6 million

The Clink of Ice is a 2010 French black comedy film written and directed by Bertrand Blier. The plot centers on Charles (Jean Dujardin), an alcoholic writer who is confronted by an incarnation of his own cancer (Albert Dupontel). The film's original French title is Le Bruit des glaçons, which literally means "The noise of ice cubes".

== Cast ==
- Jean Dujardin as Charles
- Albert Dupontel as Charles' cancer
- Anne Alvaro as Louisa
- Myriam Boyer as Louisa's cancer
- Christa Theret as Evguenia
- Audrey Dana as Carole
- Emile Berling as Stanislas Faulque
- Geneviève Mnich as Evguenia's mother
- Jean Dell as The oncologist
- Damien Bonnard as Yob 2

== Production ==
The budget was around 7 million Euro, including money from the TV channel France 2. Filming started 30 November 2009 and ended seven weeks later in Anduze, close to Nîmes, southern France. Major film studio Pathé was originally involved but left the production in the summer 2009.

== Reception ==
Review aggregation website Rotten Tomatoes reported an approval rating of 80%, based on 5 reviews, with an average score of 5.5/10.

== Accolades ==
| Award / Film Festival | Category | Recipients and nominees | Result |
|---|---|---|---|
| César Awards | Best Director | Bertrand Blier | Nominated |
| César Awards | Best Supporting Actress | Anne Alvaro | Won |
| César Awards | Best Original Screenplay | Bertrand Blier | Nominated |
| Lumière Awards | Most Promising Actor | Emile Berling | Nominated |
| Venice Film Festival | Europa Cinemas Label | | Won |
