= The Taste of Others =

- Poster
- French: Le goût des autres
- Directed by: Agnès Jaoui
- Written by: Agnès Jaoui; Jean-Pierre Bacri
- Produced by: Christian Bérard; Charles Gassot; Jacques Hinstin
- Starring: Anne Alvaro; Jean-Pierre Bacri; Alain Chabat; Agnès Jaoui; Gérard Lanvin; Christiane Millet; Wladimir Yordanoff
- Cinematography: Laurent Dailland
- Edited by: Hervé de Luze
- Music by: Jean-Charles Jarrel
- Distributed by: Pathé Distribution
- Release date: 1 March 2000
- Running time: 112 minutes
- Country: France
- Language: French
- Budget: $10.2 million
- Box office: $23.6 million

The Taste of Others (French: Le Goût des autres [lə ɡu dez‿otʁ]) is a 2000 French film. It was directed by Agnès Jaoui, and written by her and Jean-Pierre Bacri. It stars Jean-Pierre Bacri, Anne Alvaro, Alain Chabat, Agnès Jaoui, Gérard Lanvin and Christiane Millet.

It won the César Award for Best Film, Best Supporting Actor, Best Supporting Actress and Best Original Screenplay or Adaptation in 2001, and was nominated for an Academy Award for Best Foreign Language Film.

== Plot ==
Castella (Bacri) owns a steel factory. He is told that in order to conduct business with a group of Iranians, he must learn English, so he hires Clara (Alvaro) to teach him. His wife, Angelique (Millet), is an interior decorator who loves her dog and is in the process of working on her sister-in-law's apartment. The couple goes to the theatre, where their niece is performing in a production of Bérénice, accompanied by the driver, Bruno (Chabat), and Castella's temporary bodyguard, Franck (Lanvin). While there, he sees Clara, who is an actress. Meanwhile, we learn from Franck and Bruno's conversation that the former was a police officer. After working tirelessly with his partner towards bringing down a seemingly untouchable criminal, their investigation was abruptly ended. Franck had finally suffered enough corruption and quit the force, while the partner he respected never spoke a word about it.

Franck sends Bruno to the bar to buy cigarettes. The barmaid, Manie (Jaoui), remembers having had sex with Bruno, but Bruno regrets that he does not remember her.

After Bérénice, Clara goes to the bar with her friends, including Antoine and Valerie, and their conversation reveals that she is afraid of never working again; after all, she is forty years old. Bruno, whose fiancée is doing an internship in the United States, spends the night with Manie, who, it turns out, sells drugs on the side and is frequently visited by clients. Franck meets Manie through Bruno, and they start a relationship.

Previously uninterested in theater and reluctant about seeing a play rather than having dinner in a restaurant, Castella attends another of Clara's performances and develops a fascination with her bohemian lifestyle. He joins her and her friends for lunch and attends an art show where he buys a piece. However, his cultural ignorance and general roughness make him a laughingstock. At the bar with Clara's friends, they joke with him that Henrik Ibsen is a great comic playwright, as well as other dramatists like Tennessee Williams. Clara confides to her friend Manie that Castella is thick.

Castella's English is poor at first, but he soon makes progress. He and Clara move the classes from his office to an English tea room, and to mark his progress, he writes an awkward poem dedicated to Clara; however, he is dismayed when she says that she does not share the feelings expressed in his poem. One day she waits at the tea room and he doesn't show up. Throughout the film, Bruno practices his flute, which he plays in a band. Later, he gently complains to Manie that he hasn't received news from his girlfriend who has gone to the US for an internship. Finally, the girlfriend tells him that she has, like him, slept with someone else, and also wants to stay in the States. Manie has now developed an intense affair with Franck, to the point that they speak of marriage—jokingly, they say. However, Franck reveals himself to be more and more angry and bothered regarding Manie's drug dealing, which proves to finally end their relationship.

Castella and Angelique are drifting apart, which is made clear when she moves the painting he bought from Clara's friend. She doesn't like it and says it doesn't go with the rest of the house. He retorts that he can't stand living in a candy store, referring to Angelique's interior decorating. Clara starts to feel that her friends are taking advantage of Castella and tells him. He tells her that he bought the painting and is working with her friend to redesign the front of his factory not for her but because he truly likes those things. Franck's contract is finished, and Bruno reveals that the corrupt politician he had tried to send to prison was finally caught by his former partner. Bruno says that he thinks the partner was right to stay on the force after all. This leads Franck to drive to Manie's apartment for a reconciliation. From her window, she sees him reach the door to the lobby, but he hesitates and finally drives away. Clara lands the lead part in Hedda Gabler and invites Castella to the opening. Agitated after seeing an empty chair all night, Clara is overjoyed to see him in the audience as she takes her final bow.

== Cast ==
- Jean-Pierre Bacri as Jean-Jacques Castella
- Anne Alvaro as Clara Devaux
- Alain Chabat as Bruno Deschamps
- Agnès Jaoui as Manie
- Gérard Lanvin as Franck Moreno
- Christiane Millet as Angélique Castella
- Wladimir Yordanoff as Antoine
- Anne Le Ny as Valérie
- Brigitte Catillon as Béatrice Castella
- Raphaël Defour as Benoît
- Xavier de Guillebon as Weber

== Themes ==
Speaking to Paris Match in 2004 Agnès Jaoui said; "I detest mono-cultures. The problem of identity is something very complicated with me. I am profoundly secular, but if I were attacked for being Jewish, I would scream. And I want the right to say I violently condemn the politics of Ariel Sharon, even if it's complex. It's the same thing for Jean-Pierre as it is for me, it is the individual who counts. It's the social dimension of characters that interests us, not their roots or their heredity. I detest the notion of the inward looking group. It's this we tried to say in The Taste of Others. Whether it is a religious clan or a group of snobs, it's the same in our eyes. It's the same dogma, the same fundamentalism."

== Reception ==
=== Critical response ===
As of January 2022, the film holds a 98% approval rating on Rotten Tomatoes, based on 60 reviews with an average rating of 7.8/10. The critical consensus states: "The Taste of Others is a fresh, witty comedy about the attraction of opposites. The characters are well-drawn and engaging and their social interactions believable." Metacritic assigned the film a weighted average score of 78 out of 100, based on 24 critics, indicating "generally favorable reviews".

=== Box office ===
The film opened at the top of the French box office with a gross of $4.3 million in its opening week from 711,458 admissions.

=== Awards and nominations ===
==== Won ====
- César Awards
  - Best Actor – Supporting Role
  - Best Actress – Supporting Role
  - César Award for Best Film
  - Best Original Screenplay or Adaptation
- David di Donatello Awards
  - Best Foreign Film
- European Film Awards
  - Best Screenwriter (Jean-Pierre Bacri and Agnès Jaoui)
- Montréal Film Festival
  - Grand Prix des Amériques (Agnès Jaoui; tied with Innocence)

==== Nominated ====
- Academy Awards
  - Academy Award for Best Foreign Language Film
- César Awards
  - Best Actor – Leading Role (Jean-Pierre Bacri)
  - Best Actor – Supporting Role (Alain Chabat)
  - Best Actress – Supporting Role (Agnès Jaoui)
  - Best Director (Agnès Jaoui)
  - Best Editing (Hervé de Luze)
- European Film Awards
  - Best Film
  - European Discovery of the Year (Agnès Jaoui)

== See also ==
- List of submissions to the 73rd Academy Awards for Best Foreign Language Film
- List of French submissions for the Academy Award for Best Foreign Language Film
