= Under the Rainbow (2013 film) =

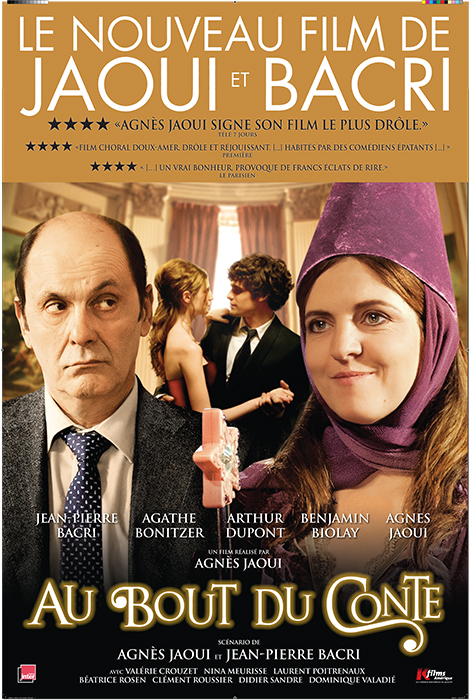
- Film poster
- French: Au bout du conte
- Directed by: Agnès Jaoui
- Written by: Jean-Pierre Bacri; Agnès Jaoui
- Produced by: Alexandre Mallet-Guy
- Starring: Jean-Pierre Bacri; Agnès Jaoui; Agathe Bonitzer; Benjamin Biolay
- Cinematography: Lubomir Bakchev
- Edited by: Fabrice Rouaud
- Music by: Fernando Fiszbein
- Production companies: La Cinéfacture; Les Films A4; France 2 Cinéma; Memento Films Production
- Distributed by: Memento Films
- Release dates: 14 February 2013 (Lyon); 6 March 2013 (France)
- Running time: 112 minutes
- Country: France
- Language: French
- Budget: $6.5 million
- Box office: $8.6 million

Under the Rainbow (French: Au bout du conte, lit. 'At the End of the Tale') is a 2013 French comedy film directed by Agnès Jaoui. It was co-written by Jaoui and Jean-Pierre Bacri.

== Cast ==
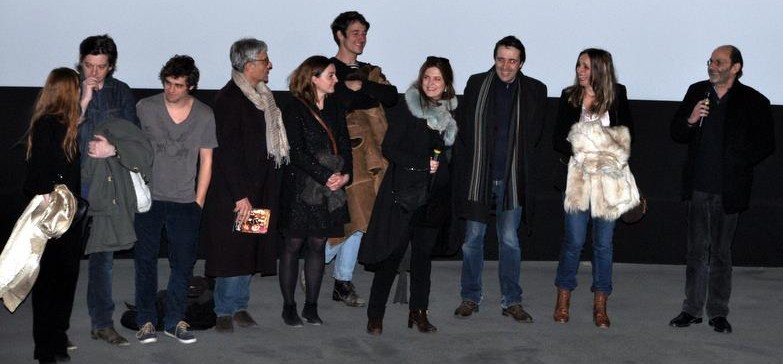
The cast at a preview.

- Agathe Bonitzer as Laura
- Agnès Jaoui as Marianne
- Arthur Dupont as Sandro
- Jean-Pierre Bacri as Pierre
- Benjamin Biolay as Maxime Wolf
- Dominique Valadié as Jacqueline
- Valérie Crouzet as Éléonore
- Beatrice Rosen as Fanfan
- Didier Sandre as Guillaume Casseul
- Laurent Poitrenaux as Éric
- Nina Meurisse as Clémence

== Reception ==
Jordan Mintzer of The Hollywood Reporter called it "A modern-day fairy tale wrapped in a cloak of sly one-liners and deadpan existentialism"
