= Same Old Song =

- Theatrical release poster
- Directed by: Alain Resnais
- Written by: Agnès Jaoui; Jean-Pierre Bacri
- Produced by: Bruno Pésery
- Starring: Agnès Jaoui; Jean-Pierre Bacri
- Cinematography: Renato Berta
- Edited by: Hervé de Luze
- Music by: Henri Christiné; Bruno Fontaine
- Distributed by: AMLF
- Release date: 12 November 1997
- Running time: 120 minutes
- Country: France
- Language: French
- Budget: $7.9 million
- Box office: $39 million

Same Old Song (French: On connaît la chanson) is a 1997 French comedy-drama film. It was directed by Alain Resnais, and written by Agnès Jaoui and Jean-Pierre Bacri. Jaoui and Bacri also starred in the film with Sabine Azéma, Lambert Wilson, André Dussollier and Pierre Arditi.

== Plot ==
Odile (Azéma), a business executive, is married to weak, furtive Claude (Arditi). In the past Odile was close to successful businessman Nicolas (Bacri), now married with kids and returning to Paris after an eight-year absence. She is looking for a new, bigger apartment from estate agent Marc (Wilson). Her younger sister Camille (Jaoui), has just completed her doctoral thesis in history and is a Paris tour guide. Simon (Dussollier) is a regular on Camille's tours because he's attracted to her, although he claims to be researching his historical radio dramas. Camille has fallen for Marc, and they begin an affair. Nicolas is also looking for an apartment, since he hopes to eventually have his family join him in Paris.

The most original feature of this "musical" is that characters break into songs as sung by the original artists, i.e. depending on the circumstances, a female character may all of a sudden start singing in a male voice and vice versa. The film's debt to Dennis Potter is acknowledged with a dedication in the opening credits.

== Cast ==
- Pierre Arditi as Claude Lalande
- Sabine Azéma as Odile Lalande, Claude's wife
- Jean-Pierre Bacri as Nicolas
- André Dussollier as Simon
- Agnès Jaoui as Camille, Odile's younger sister
- Lambert Wilson as Marc Duveyrier, Simon's boss
- Jane Birkin as Jane, the wife of Nicolas
- Françoise Bertin as Little Lady on Tour
- Jean-Paul Roussillon as the father of Odile and Camille
- Jean-Pierre Darroussin as the man with the cheque
- Claire Nadeau and Frédérique Cantrel as Female Guest

== Songs ==
- Josephine Baker : J'ai deux amours
- Dalida and Alain Delon : Paroles, paroles
- Charles Aznavour : Et moi dans mon coin
- René Koval : C'est dégoutant mais nécessaire
- Simone Simon : Afin de plaire à son papa
- Gaston Ouvrard : Je n'suis pas bien portant
- Albert Préjean : Je m'donne
- Jacques Dutronc : J'aime les filles
- Michel Sardou : Déjà vu
- Gilbert Bécaud : Nathalie
- Maurice Chevalier : Dans la vie faut pas s'en faire
- Arletty and Aquistapace : Et le reste
- Édith Piaf: J'm'en fous pas mal
- Alain Bashung : Vertige de l'amour
- Sheila : L'école est finie
- Serge Lama : Je suis malade
- Léo Ferré : Avec le temps
- Henri Garat : Avoir un bon copain
- Jane Birkin : Quoi
- France Gall : Résiste
- Albert Préjean : Amusez-vous
- Henri Garat : La tête qu'il faut faire
- Alain Souchon : Sous les jupes des filles
- Eddy Mitchell : La dernière séance
- Sylvie Vartan : La plus belle pour aller danser
- Serge Gainsbourg : Je suis venu te dire que je m'en vais
- Eddy Mitchell : Je vous dérange
- Téléphone : Ça c'est vraiment toi
- Dranem : Quand on perd la tête
- Johnny Hallyday : Ma gueule
- Pierre Perret : Mon p'tit loup
- Claude François : Le mal-aimé
- Michel Jonasz : J'veux pas qu'tu t'en ailles
- Julien Clerc : Ce n'est rien
- Claude François : Chanson populaire
- Eddy Mitchell : Blues du blanc

=== Production ===
Filming began on 6 January 1997.

=== Accolades ===
The film won the César Award for Best Film, Best Actor, Best Supporting Actor, Best Supporting Actress, Best Original Screenplay or Adaptation, Best Editing and Best Sound in 1998. It won the Louis Delluc Prize in 1997. At the 48th Berlin International Film Festival in 1998, Resnais won the Silver Bear for outstanding artistic contribution.

=== Box office ===
The film opened in France the same week as Alien Resurrection, opening on 158 screens and grossing 30.3 million French Francs ($5.3 million) for the week, compared to 38.9 million French Francs for Alien Resurrection from 507 screens, and finishing in second place at the French box office. It went on to gross $39 million.
