= Myriam Bella =

French actress

Myriam Bella is a French actress.

== Filmography ==
=== Film ===
- 2007 : Comme les autres
- 2010: The Return of the Son
- 2011: Twiggy
- 2015 : D'une pierre, deux coups
