= Look at Me (2004 film) =

- French film poster
- Directed by: Agnès Jaoui
- Written by: Jean-Pierre Bacri; Agnès Jaoui
- Produced by: Jean-Philippe Andraca; Christian Bérard
- Starring: Marilou Berry; Agnès Jaoui; Jean-Pierre Bacri; Jackie Berroyer
- Cinematography: Stéphane Fontaine
- Edited by: François Gédigier
- Music by: Philippe Rombi
- Distributed by: Mars Distribution
- Release date: 16 May 2004
- Running time: 110 minutes
- Country: France
- Language: French
- Budget: $11.7 million
- Box office: $18.7 million

Look at Me (French: Comme une image) is a 2004 French drama-comedy film directed by Agnès Jaoui. It won the Best Screenplay award at the 2004 Cannes Film Festival. The film features a clip from the 1948 film Blood on the Moon.

== Plot ==
Lolita Cassard lacks confidence and self-esteem because she doesn't look like the women who fill the pages of fashion magazines. Her father, Étienne Cassard, is a respected novelist, but rarely considers the feelings of others, only thinking of himself and worrying about aging. Pierre Millet, a younger writer, doubts he will ever be successful. Meanwhile, Sylvia Millet, a singing teacher, believes in her husband's talent, but doubts her own and that of her student, Lolita. When Sylvia discovers that Lolita is the daughter of Étienne, an author she admires, she befriends Lolita in order to gain access to Étienne for her husband's sake. Lolita does not see that Sylvia is just another person being generous to her because her father is famous. She begins to confide in Sylvia about her father, love life, and self-confidence issues. Sylvia takes a liking to Lolita and begins to see Étienne for the man he really is. Sébastien, a young journalist, befriends Lolita. He takes a liking to her, but she shows no interest, infatuated with another boy, Mathieu. Mathieu is interested in Lolita only because of her father and mistreats her. Lolita assumes the same of Sébastien and does not realize that he likes her for herself. After a crazy weekend at Étienne's cottage, Sylvia leaves Pierre because he has become like Étienne, Lolita realizes Sébastien has honest intentions, and Étienne is repeatedly reminded that he is an indifferent father to Lolita.

== Cast ==
- Marilou Berry – Lolita Cassard
- Agnès Jaoui – Sylvia Millet
- Jean-Pierre Bacri – Étienne Cassard
- Laurent Grévill – Pierre Millet
- Virginie Desarnauts – Karine Cassard
- Keine Bouhiza – Sébastien
- Grégoire Oestermann – Vincent
- Serge Riaboukine – Félix
- Michèle Moretti – Édith

== Critical reception ==
The film was well received by the critics. Review aggregator Rotten Tomatoes reports that 87% of 98 critics gave it a positive review, for an average rating of 7.6/10. The site's consensus reads "An observant drama-comedy about self absorption."
