= Osmosis (TV series) =

French science fiction television series

- Genre: Science fiction; Drama
- Created by: Audrey Fouché
- Starring: Hugo Becker; Agathe Bonitzer; Stéphane Pitti; Gaël Kamilindi; Suzanne Rault-Balet; Luna Silva; Manoel Dupont; Yuming Hey
- Composer: HiTnRuN
- Country of origin: France
- Original language: French
- No. of seasons: 1
- No. of episodes: 8

Production
- Executive producer: Audrey Fouché
- Producers: Sarah Aknine; Aude Albano; Claude Chelli
- Cinematography: Jean-François Hensgens; Julien Bureau
- Editor: Sarah Anderson
- Camera setup: Single-camera
- Running time: 32-48 minutes
- Production company: CAPA Drama

Original release
- Network: Netflix
- Release: 29 March 2019

Osmosis is a French science fiction television series created by Audrey Fouché. The first season, consisting of eight episodes, was released on 29 March 2019 on Netflix. The series stars Hugo Becker, Agathe Bonitzer, Stéphane Pitti, Gaël Kamilindi, Suzanne Rault-Balet, Luna Silva, Manoel Dupont and Yuming Hey.

On 17 January 2020, Netflix cancelled the series after one season.

== Synopsis ==
Set in near-future Paris, Osmosis centers around a dating app of the same name that analyses its users' brain data to find a perfect match for each user.

== Cast and characters ==
=== Main ===
- Hugo Becker as Paul Vanhove, CEO of Osmosis and first tester of the implant.
- Agathe Bonitzer as Esther Vanhove, Paul's sister and technical genius creator of Osmosis
- Stéphane Pitti as Lucas Apert
- Gaël Kamilindi as Gabriel
- Suzanne Rault-Balet as Swann
- Luna Silva as Ana Stern
- Manoel Dupont as Niels Larsen
- Yuming Hey as Billie Tual

=== Recurring ===
- Vincent Renaudet as Martin, the AI of Osmosis
- Lena Laprès as Claire Salomon
- Philypa Phoenix as Joséphine Vanhove, Paul's wife.
- Lionel Lingelser as Léopold Goulard
- Fabien Ducommun as Antoine Fouché
- Waly Dia as Simon
- Aurélia Petit as Louise Vanhove
- Christiane Conil as Cécile Larsen
- Laure-Lucile Simon as Eloan Spivack
- Dimitri Storoge as Mathieu Christo
- Pierre Hancisse as Samuel Kahn
- Sarah-Jane Sauvegrain as Romy
- Camille-François Nicol as Tom
- Jeremy Lewin as Romeo
- Jimmy Labeeu as Ilyes

== Production ==
=== Development ===
On 11 May 2017, it was announced that Netflix had given the production a series order for a first season consisting of eight episodes. The series is created by Audrey Fouché, who is credited as an executive producer. Osmosis is based on an idea from a former project of the same title created by Louis Chiche, William Chiche and Gabriel Chiche and produced by Telfrance and Arte in 2015. In February 2019, it was announced that the series would premiere on 29 March 2019. The production company reportedly spent a budget of €8 million for the first season, with each episode costing €1 million. On 1 April 2019, it was confirmed that Audrey Fouché departed the series as a showrunner after the first season. On 17 January 2020, Netflix cancelled the series after one season.

=== Casting ===
In August 2018, it was announced that Hugo Becker, Agathe Bonitzer, Stephane Pitti, Gael Kamilindi and Suzanne Rault-Balet had been cast in the series. In February 2019, it was announced that Luna Silva, Manoel Dupont and Yuming Hey were added to the cast.

=== Filming ===
Principal photography for the first season took place on location in Paris in 2018.

== Episodes ==
No.	Title	Directed by	Written by	Original release date
1	"The Test"	Julius Berg	Anne Rambach and Marine Rambach	29 March 2019
Siblings Esther and Paul have begun clinical trials for a drug called Osmosis, which helps its users find their soulmates. Esther goes to visit her sick mother in hospital. When coming back from the hospital, Esther is met by a woman and her teenage son, Niels. Niels' mother begs Esther to include Niels in the trials since he is 'sick'. The 12 people in the trials sign a form and it begins. Paul has a meeting with his investors, who want to fire him. He lies to his colleague, saying that the investors wanted to drop the whole project, so they must go ahead without their money. Esther watches Niels' interview, since she feels sorry for him and wants to include him in the trials. He admits that he is a sex addict and that he hopes Osmosis will help him. Paul tells Esther about the investors dropping out and says they must sell their mother's house for money, much to Esther's frustration. Paul makes an ad to attract new investors and Esther goes to the hospital again. Someone drops out of the trials, so Niels is given a place. Humanists who oppose the drug hack into the workplace system. Paul finds a note from his wife (whom he met through using Osmosis) saying that she has run away. Paul believes that she has been kidnapped. The episode ends with the clients seeing their soulmates' faces in their heads.
2	"Soulmate"	Julius Berg	Anne Rambach and Marine Rambach	29 March 2019
The episode starts with a flashback showing Esther putting the Osmosis implant in Paul's brain. In the present Paul reports his wife missing to the police. The clients head out to find their soulmate and hopefully secure a connection with them. Niels' soulmate is a pretty girl who runs a painting class which he joins and later they hang out and become close. Ana meets her soulmate who is a sports teacher, which is ironic since she hates sport. Lucas goes home to his boyfriend who doesn't seem to know that he's in the trial. He later heads out to spy on his soulmate who also has a boyfriend. Esther tells Paul about the hacks into the system. Ana joins her soulmates fitness class. Later she goes to Osmosis' headquarters to ask about the implant. It is revealed she is spying on Osmosis to the humanists. Paul and Gabriel pitch to new investors. Esther tracks down Paul's wife using her Osmosis implant to a nightclub where she sees her being dragged away by some men in masks.
3	"Troubles"	Pierre Aknine	Anne Rambach and Marine Rambach	29 March 2019
After Esther discovers that Paul's wife really was kidnapped, she suspects a mole in the company and tells Paul who dismisses her. Paul gets a flashback to a romantic evening with his wife. Neils has been ask to take a break from his soulmate since it gets a too bit much for him.
4	"Crisis"	Pierre Aknine	Anne Rambach and Marine Rambach	29 March 2019
5	"Betrayal"	Mona Achache	Olivier Fox	29 March 2019
6	"Separation"	Mona Achache	Éric Forestier	29 March 2019
7	"Redemption"	Pierre Aknine	Anne Badel and Aurélie Belko	29 March 2019
8	"Rebirth"	Pierre Aknine	Anne Badel, Éric Forestier and Olivier Fox	29 March 2019

== Release ==
On 28 February 2019, the official trailer for the series was released.

=== Premiere ===
On 24 March 2019, the series held its official premiere with the screening of the first two episodes at the Series Mania International Festival in Lille, France.

== Reception ==
The first season received positive reviews upon its release. The review aggregator website Rotten Tomatoes reported a 100% approval rating with an average rating of 6/10 based on 5 reviews.

Noah Berlatsky from The Verge mentioned in a positive review of the first two episodes of the series, that "Technology in Osmosis doesn't create a dystopia or a utopia in itself. It's just a tool, and different people project different dreams and fears onto it, for better and worse" and that this "level of nuance and awareness makes Osmosis start out thoughtful and refreshing." Greg Wheeler from The Review Geek recommended the first season in their review of the series by stating that "Osmosis is a really thrilling sci-fi trip, one asking some big questions around love and relationships while delivering a well written story full of twists and turns along the way."

Devin Townsend from The Breeze complimented the first season in his review by adding that the series is "thought-provoking and edges on the air of irony. It relies on the audience's knowledge of the challenging world of dating and how cynical the human race is becoming with their choice of an "other half"." In a positive review of the series, Jon O'Brien from i-D wrote that, "Osmosis delivers a more optimistic proclamation. Humankind and machines can in fact live in relative harmony, and without the fear of murderous robot dogs, head-exploding video games or hashtag-powered genocides. And should disaster strike, it's more likely to be us pesky humans to blame."

Emma Stefansky from Thrillist praised the series, stating that "Osmosis joins the ranks of shows like the German time-travel thriller Dark, the Danish zombie eco-pocalypse The Rain, and the South Korean medieval drama Kingdom, creating a subgenre within Netflix of remarkably good foreign-language genre television" and further adding that it "is the kind of show you can just sit and absorb." Laurie Clarke of Techworld gave the series a positive recommendation saying that its "handling of a technologically entwined future is much more subtle than the at-times hamfisted approach of Black Mirror and it breathes some much-needed humanity back into tech-centric fictions."
