= My Wife Cries =

2026 drama film by Angela Schanelec

- International promotional poster
- German: Meine Frau weint
- Directed by: Angela Schanelec
- Written by: Angela Schanelec
- Produced by: Saïd Ben Saïd; Kirill Krasovski
- Starring: Vladimir Vulevic; Agathe Bonitzer; Birte Schnöink; Laure-Lucile Simon; Clara Gostynski
- Cinematography: Marius Panduru
- Edited by: Angela Schanelec
- Music by: Rainer Gerlach
- Production companies: Blue Monticola Film; Faktura Film; SBS Productions
- Distributed by: Grandfilm (Germany)
- Release dates: 17 February 2026 (Berlinale); 11 June 2026 (Germany)
- Running time: 93 minutes
- Countries: Germany; France
- Language: German

My Wife Cries (German: Meine Frau weint) is a 2026 drama film written and directed by Angela Schanelec. It stars Vladimir Vulevic, Agathe Bonitzer, Birte Schnöink and Laure-Lucile Simon.

The film had its world premiere at the main competition of the 76th Berlin International Film Festival on 17 February 2026, where it was nominated for the Golden Bear. It was theatrically released in Germany on 11 June.

== Premise ==
While at work, Thomas, a 40-year-old crane operator, receives a phone call: His wife is in the hospital and asks him to pick her up. He finds her crying.

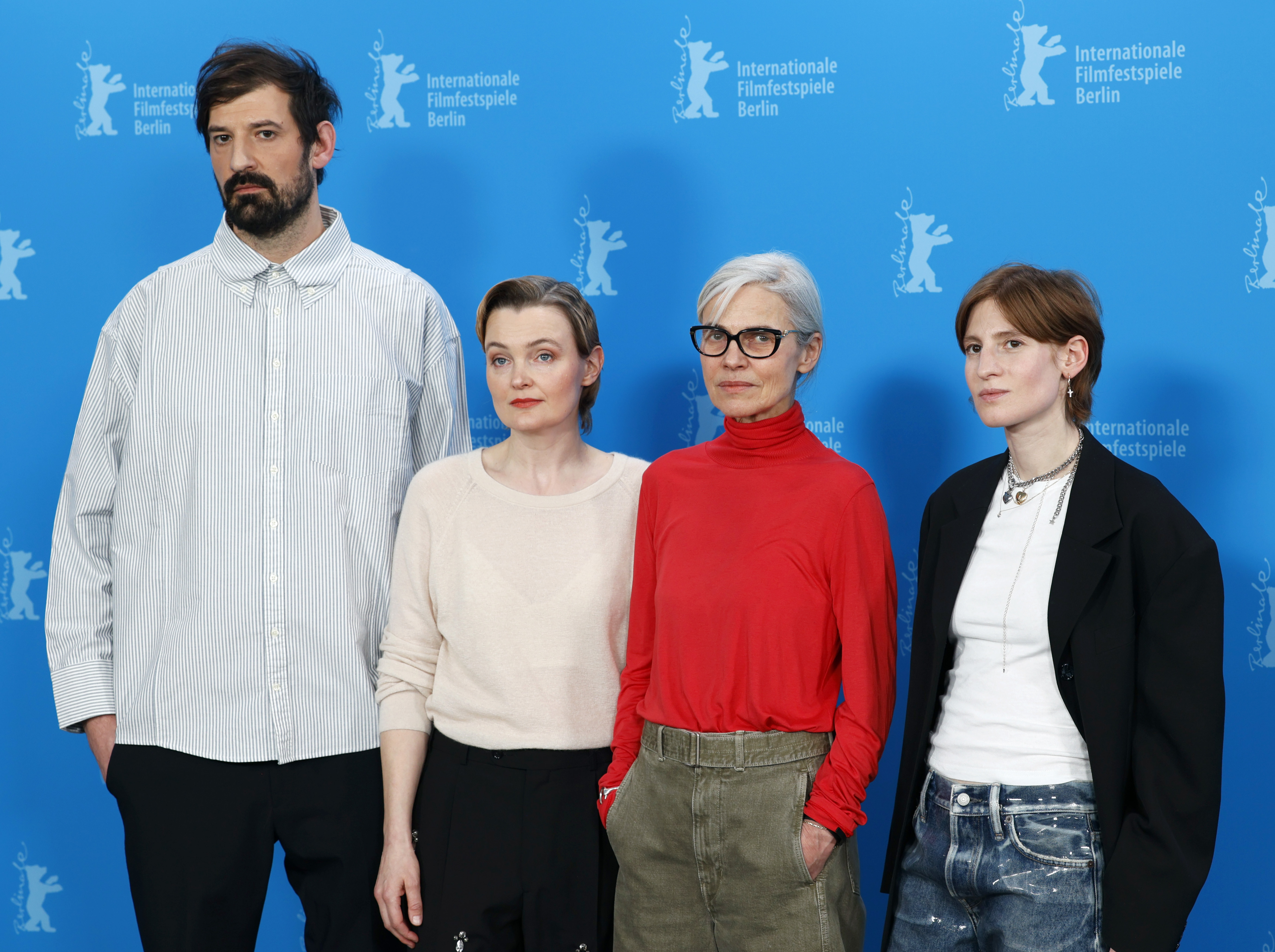
Vladimir Vulevic, Birte Schnöink, Angela Schanelec and Agathe Bonitzer during the 76th Berlin International Film Festival

== Cast ==
- Vladimir Vulevic as Thomas
- Agathe Bonitzer as Carla
- Birte Schnöink as Andrée
- Pauline Rebmann as Karen
- Ben Carter as Laszlo
- Thorbjörn Björnsson as Esteban
- Laure-Lucile Simon as Sophie
- Clara Gostynski as Claudia

== Production ==
Initially titled Thomas le Fort, it's produced by Saïd Ben Saïd for SBS Productions, and by Kirill Krasovski for Faktura Film.

Principal photography took place between 4 July and 10 September 2025. Shooting took place on location in Berlin and Galicia, Spain.

Romanian cinematographer Marius Panduru shot the film on 35mm in the 4:3 aspect ratio, marking his first collaboration with Schanelec.

== Release ==
The film had its world premiere at the main competition of the 76th Berlin International Film Festival on 17 February 2026. It was selected for the Wavelengths section of the 2026 Toronto International Film Festival, and was also selected for the Main Slate of the 2026 New York Film Festival.

The film will be screened for Japanese Premiere on 29 October 2026 in the World Focus section of the 39th Tokyo International Film Festival.
