= Twiggy (film) =

- Film poster
- French: La brindille
- Directed by: Emmanuelle Millet
- Written by: Emmanuelle Millet
- Produced by: Catherine Bozorgan; Christine Gozlan; David Poirot-Gozlan
- Starring: Christa Théret
- Cinematography: Antoine Héberlé
- Edited by: Emmanuelle Castro; Anny Danché
- Music by: Christophe Julien
- Production companies: Thelma Films; Manchester Films
- Distributed by: Ad Vitam Distribution
- Release date: 21 September 2011
- Running time: 81 minutes
- Country: France
- Language: French
- Box office: $127,500

Twiggy (French: La brindille) is a 2011 French drama film directed by Emmanuelle Millet.

== Plot ==
Sarah is 20 years old. She lives in a home for young workers and works at a museum in Marseille, where she hopes to achieve tenure soon. She enjoys her life as a young single woman. One day she discovers that the museum has decided not to hire her. Without work she will have to leave her home and as if this weren't enough, she discovers that she is six months pregnant.

== Cast ==
- Christa Théret as Sarah Dol
- Johan Libéreau as Thomas
- Anne Le Ny as Sonia
- Maud Wyler as Julie
- Myriam Bella as Leila
- Emilie Chesnais as Marie
- Cathy Ruiz as Sylvie
- Dimitri Mazzuchini as David
- Maéva Fertier as Lola
- Gabrielle Malésis as Nadège
- Léa Ambrogiani as Zoé
- Lili Sagit as Léa
- Amandine Arrighi as Milka
- Laure Grandbesançon as Nina
- Lucile Aknin as Marie-Eve
- Chloé Trombella as Angèle
- Manuel Diaz as Abel
- Nicolas Marié as The doctor
- Albert Dupontel as The museum director
- Laure Duthilleul as The consultant
- Nina Meurisse as The midwife

== Accolades ==
Award	Category	Recipient	Result
César Award	César Award for Most Promising Actress	Christa Théret	Nominated
Taipei Film Festival	International New Talent Competition - Grand Prize	Emmanuelle Millet	Nominated
