= César Award for Best Supporting Actress =

French film award

César de la meilleure actrice dans un second rôle César Award for Best Actress in a Supporting Role
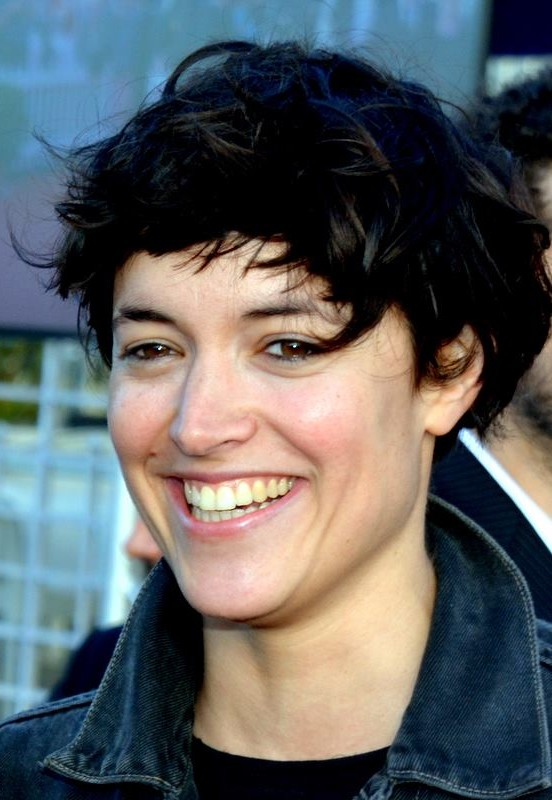
- 2026 recipient: Vimala Pons
- Awarded for: Best Actress in a Supporting Role
- Country: France
- Presented by: Académie des Arts et Techniques du Cinéma
- First award: 1976
- Currently held by: Vimala Pons for The Ties That Bind Us (2026)
- Website: academie-cinema.org

The César Award for Best Actress in a Supporting Role (French: César de la meilleure actrice dans un second rôle) is one of the César Awards, presented annually by the Académie des Arts et Techniques du Cinéma to recognize the outstanding performance in a supporting role of an actress who has worked within the French film industry during the year preceding the ceremony. Nominees and winner are selected via a run-off voting by all the members of the Académie.

== History ==
=== Superlatives ===
Superlative	Best Actress		Best Supporting Actress		Overall (including Most Promising Actress)	
Actress with most awards	Isabelle Adjani	5	Dominique Blanc	3	Isabelle Adjani	5
Actress with most nominations	Isabelle Huppert	14	Noémie Lvovsky	7	Isabelle Huppert	16
Actress with most nominations without ever winning	Emmanuelle Béart; Charlotte Gainsbourg; Cécile de France	5	Noémie Lvovsky	7	Noémie Lvovsky	7
Film with most nominations	Too Beautiful for You; The Ceremony; 8 Women; Feelings; Polisse; In Safe Hands	2	The Crisis	3	Venus Beauty Institute; 8 Women; Polisse	4
Oldest winner	Emmanuelle Riva	85	Suzanne Flon	72	Emmanuelle Riva	85
Oldest nominee	Emmanuelle Riva	85	Claude Gensac	87	Claude Gensac	87
Youngest winner	Sandrine Bonnaire	18	Déborah Lukumuena	22	Sandrine Bonnaire	18
Youngest nominee	Charlotte Gainsbourg	14	Christine Pascal	22	Charlotte Gainsbourg	14

As of 2019, 137 actresses have been nominated in the category, with a total of 34 different winners. The average age at first nomination is 41 and the average age of winners at first win is 38.

With three wins (1991, 1993, 1999), Dominique Blanc holds the record of most César Award for Best Supporting Actress. Eight actresses have won the César twice: Marie-France Pisier (1976, 1977), Nathalie Baye (1981, 1982), Suzanne Flon (1984, 1990), Annie Girardot (1996, 2002), Valérie Lemercier (1994, 2007), Julie Depardieu (2004, 2008), Anne Alvaro (2001, 2011) and Karin Viard (2003, 2019).

Marie-France Pisier and Nathalie Baye have won their two awards in consecutive years. Along with Adèle Haenel, they are the only three performers to have won two competitive acting César in a row. Including her Best Actress César won in 1983, Nathalie Baye is also the only performer to have won an acting César in three consecutive years, in 1981, 1982 and 1983.

Noémie Lvovsky and Karin Viard tie for the record of most nominations with 6, Lvovsky also holding the record of most nominations without ever winning the award. Stéphane Audran holds the record of most consecutive nominations with 3 (1982, 1983, 1984).

Nine women have won both the César Award for Best Supporting Actress and the César Award for Best Actress:

- Nathalie Baye (Best Supporting Actress in 1981 and 1982, Best Actress in 1983 and 2006),
- Annie Girardot (Best Actress in 1977, Best Supporting Actress in 1996 and 2002),
- Dominique Blanc (Best Supporting Actress in 1991, 1993 and 1999, Best Actress in 2001),
- Karin Viard (Best Actress in 2000, Best Supporting Actress in 2003 and 2019),
- Marion Cotillard (Best Supporting Actress in 2005, Best Actress in 2008),
- Emmanuelle Devos (Best Actress in 2002, Best Supporting Actress in 2010),
- Adèle Haenel (Best Supporting Actress in 2014, Best Actress in 2015),
- Catherine Frot (Best Supporting Actress in 1997, Best Actress in 2016).
- Fanny Ardant (Best Actress in 1997, Best Supporting Actress in 2020),

Nathalie Baye is the only actress with multiple wins in both categories.

Three films have received both accolades: One Deadly Summer in 1984 (Best Actress to Isabelle Adjani, Best Supporting Actress to Suzanne Flon), Indochine in 1993 (Best Actress to Catherine Deneuve, Best Supporting Actress to Dominique Blanc) and Queen Margot in 1995 (Best Actress to Isabelle Adjani, Best Supporting Actress to Virna Lisi).

Three women have won the César Award for Best Supporting Actress after previously winning the César Award for Most Promising Actress:

- Charlotte Gainsbourg (Most Promising Actress in 1986, Best Supporting Actress in 2000),
- Julie Depardieu (Most Promising Actress in 2004, Best Supporting Actress in 2004 and 2008),
- Cécile de France (Most Promising Actress in 2003, Best Supporting Actress in 2006).

Both Cécile de France and Julie Depardieu have won their two awards with a same role: Isabelle, an Erasmus student, in The Spanish Apartment (Most Promising Actress) and its sequel Russian Dolls (Best Supporting Actress) for de France, and Jeanne-Marie in Little Lili (both awards) for Depardieu.

Therefore, Depardieu is the only individual to have won two acting César for the same performance. This achievement is no longer possible as the Académie has since modified nomination rules to ensure that no individual could be nominated in more than one acting category (Best Actor/Actress or Best Supporting Actor/Actress or Most Promising Actor/Actress) for the same film.

Three films has received both accolades: An Impudent Girl in 1986 (Best Supporting Actress to Bernadette Lafont, Most Promising Actress to Charlotte Gainsbourg), Life Is a Long Quiet River in 1989 (Best Supporting Actress to Hélène Vincent, Most Promising Actress to Catherine Jacob) and Little Lili in 2004 (both awards to Julie Depardieu).

Thirteen women have received nominations in the three competitive acting categories: Best Actress, Best Supporting Actress and Most Promising Actress. They are Emmanuelle Béart, Charlotte Gainsbourg, Dominique Blanc, Anne Brochet, Karin Viard, Sandrine Kiberlain, Emmanuelle Devos, Cécile de France, Marion Cotillard, Sylvie Testud, Emilie Dequenne, Sara Forestier and Adèle Haenel. So far, no actress has achieved to win the three awards.

To date, the most long-lived winner is Suzanne Flon, who died at 87, and the most short-lived is Valérie Benguigui, who died at 47. The oldest alive winner is Hélène Vincent, aged 75, and the earliest alive winner is Nicole Garcia (Le Cavaleur, 1980).

=== International presence ===
As the César Awards are centered on the French Cinema, the majority of recipients are French and performed in French language. However, the Best Supporting Actress César has been awarded five times to a non-French actress:

- in 1995 to Italian actress Virna Lisi for her performance in Queen Margot;
- in 2006 to Belgian actress Cécile de France for her performance in Russian Dolls;
- in 2012 to Spanish actress Carmen Maura for her performance in The Women on the 6th Floor;
- in 2015 to American actress Kristen Stewart for her performance in Clouds of Sils Maria;
- in 2016 to Danish actress Sidse Babett Knudsen for her performance in Courted.

The Best Supporting Actress César has been awarded only once for a full foreign-language performance with Kristen Stewart's English-language performance. Nevertheless, Virna Lisi's and Carmen Maura's roles included some parts of Italian-language and Spanish-language, respectively.

International actresses who have received nominations are:

- Belgium: Emilie Dequenne, Cécile de France, Virginie Efira (she holds dual Belgian-French citizenship),
- Canada: Francine Racette, Charlotte Le Bon,
- Denmark: Sidse Babett Knudsen,
- Italy: Virna Lisi,
- Netherlands: Maruschka Detmers,
- Spain: Victoria Abril, Carmen Maura,
- Switzerland: Nelly Borgeaud,
- United Kingdom: Jane Birkin, Jacqueline Bisset, Charlotte Rampling, Kelly Reilly,
- United States: Kristen Stewart.

== Winners and nominees ==
Following the AATC's practice, the films below are listed by year of ceremony, which corresponds to the year following the film's year of release. For example, the César for Best Supporting Actress of 2010 was awarded on February 27, 2010 for a performance in a film released between January 1, 2009 and December 31, 2009.

Actresses are selected via a two-round vote: first round to choose the nominees, second round to designate the winner. All the members of the Académie, without regard to their branch, are eligible to vote on both rounds. Initially set to four, the number of nominees was expanded to five in 1984.

Winners are listed first in bold, followed by the other nominees in alphabetic order.

=== 1970s ===
Year	Winner and Nominees	Film	Original Title	Role(s)
1976 (1st)
1976 (1st)	**Marie-France Pisier**	**Cousin Cousine**		**Karine**
1976 (1st)	**Marie-France Pisier**	**French Provincial**	**Souvenirs d'en France**	**Régina**
1976 (1st)	Andréa Ferréol	Cookies	Les Galettes de Pont-Aven	Madame Licquois
1976 (1st)	Isabelle Huppert	Aloïse		Young Aloïse
1976 (1st)	Christine Pascal	Let Joy Reign Supreme	Que la fête commence...	Emilie
1977 (2nd)
1977 (2nd)	**Marie-France Pisier**	**Barocco**		**Nelly**
1977 (2nd)	Anny Duperey	Pardon Mon Affaire	Un Elephant ça trompe énormément	Charlotte
1977 (2nd)	Brigitte Fossey	The Good and the Bad	Le Bon et les méchants	Dominique Blanchot
1977 (2nd)	Francine Racette	Lumière		Julienne
1978 (3rd)
1978 (3rd)	**Marie Dubois**	**La Menace**		**Dominique Montlaur**
1978 (3rd)	Nelly Borgeaud	The Man Who Loved Women	L'Homme qui aimait les femmes	Delphine Grezel
1978 (3rd)	Geneviève Fontanel	The Man Who Loved Women	L'Homme qui aimait les femmes	Hélène
1978 (3rd)	Florence Giorgetti	The Lacemaker	La Dentellière	Marylène Torrent
1978 (3rd)	Valérie Mairesse	Repérages		Esther
1979 (4th)
1979 (4th)	**Stéphane Audran**	**Violette Nozière**		**Germaine Nozière**
1979 (4th)	Arlette Bonnard	A Simple Story	Une Histoire simple	Gabrielle
1979 (4th)	Éva Darlan	A Simple Story	Une Histoire simple	Anna
1979 (4th)	Nelly Borgeaud	Le Sucre		Hilda Courtois

=== 1980s ===
Year	Winner and Nominees	Film	Original Title	Role(s)
1980 (5th)	**Nicole Garcia**	**Le Cavaleur**		**Marie-France**
1980 (5th)	Myriam Boyer	Série noire		Jeanne
1980 (5th)	Dominique Lavanant	Courage – Let's Run		Mathilda
1980 (5th)	Maria Schneider	Memoirs of a French Whore	La Dérobade	Maloup
1981 (6th)	**Nathalie Baye**	**Every Man for Himself (a.k.a. Slow Motion)**	**Sauve qui peut (la vie)**	**Denise Rimbaud**
1981 (6th)	Andréa Ferréol	The Last Metro	Le Dernier Métro	Arlette Guillaume
1981 (6th)	Claire Maurier	A Bad Son	Un mauvais fils	Madeleine
1981 (6th)	Delphine Seyrig	I Sent a Letter to My Love	Chère inconnue	Yvette
1982 (7th)	**Nathalie Baye**	**Strange Affair**	**Une étrange affaire**	**Nina Coline**
1982 (7th)	Stéphane Audran	Coup de torchon		Huguette Cordier
1982 (7th)	Sabine Haudepin	Hotel America	Hôtel des Amériques	Elise Tisserand
1982 (7th)	Véronique Silver	The Woman Next Door	La Femme d'à côté	Mathilde Bauchard
1983 (8th)	**Fanny Cottençon**	**L'Étoile du Nord**		**Sylvie Baron**
1983 (8th)	Stéphane Audran	Paradis pour tous		Edith
1983 (8th)	Danielle Darrieux	Une chambre en ville		Margot Langlois
1983 (8th)	Denise Grey	La Boum 2		Poupette
1984 (9th)	**Suzanne Flon**	**One Deadly Summer**	**L'Eté meurtrier**	**Cognata**
1984 (9th)	Victoria Abril	Moon in the Gutter	La Lune dans le caniveau	Bella
1984 (9th)	Stéphane Audran	Deadly Circuit	Mortelle Randonnée	Germaine
1984 (9th)	Sabine Azéma	Life Is a Bed of Roses	La Vie est un roman	Elisabeth Rousseau
1984 (9th)	Agnès Soral	So Long, Stooge	Tchao Pantin	Lola
1985 (10th)	**Caroline Cellier**	**Year of the Jellyfish**	**L'Année des méduses**	**Claude**
1985 (10th)	Victoria Abril	L'Addition		Patty
1985 (10th)	Carole Bouquet	Rive droite, rive gauche		Babée Senanques
1985 (10th)	Élizabeth Bourgine	La Septième Cible		Laura
1985 (10th)	Maruschka Detmers	The Pirate	La Pirate	Carole
1986 (11th)	**Bernadette Lafont**	**An Impudent Girl**	**L'Effrontée**	**Léone**
1986 (11th)	Anémone	Death in a French Garden	Péril en la demeure	Edwige Ledieu
1986 (11th)	Macha Méril	Vagabond	Sans Toit ni loi	Madame Landier
1986 (11th)	Catherine Frot	Escalier C		Béatrice
1986 (11th)	Dominique Lavanant	Three Men and a Cradle	Trois Hommes et un couffin	Madame Rapons
1987 (12th)	**Emmanuelle Béart**	**Manon des Sources**		**Manon**
1987 (12th)	Clémentine Célarié	Betty Blue	37°2 le matin	Annie
1987 (12th)	Danielle Darrieux	Scene of the Crime	Le Lieu du crime	The Grandmother
1987 (12th)	Marie Dubois	Descent Into Hell	Descente aux enfers	Lucette
1987 (12th)	Jeanne Moreau	Le Paltoquet		The Bartender
1988 (13th)	**Dominique Lavanant**	**Agent trouble**		**Catherine "Karen" Dariller**
1988 (13th)	Sylvie Joly	The Miracle	Le Miraculé	Madame Fox Terrier
1988 (13th)	Anna Karina	Cayenne Palace		Lola
1988 (13th)	Marie Laforêt	Fucking Fernand		Lotte
1988 (13th)	Bernadette Lafont	Masks	Masques	Patricia Marquet
1989 (14th)	**Hélène Vincent**	**Life Is a Long Quiet River**	**La Vie est un long fleuve tranquille**	**Marielle Le Quesnoy**
1989 (14th)	María Casares	The Reader	La Lectrice	The General's widow
1989 (14th)	Françoise Fabian	Three Seats for the 26th	Trois places pour le 26	Marie-Hélène
1989 (14th)	Dominique Lavanant	Quelques jours avec moi		Irène Frontin
1989 (14th)	Marie Trintignant	Story of Women	Une Affaire de femmes	Lucie

=== 1990s ===
Year	Winners and nominees	English title	Original title	Role
1990 (15th)	**Suzanne Flon**	**La Vouivre**		**Louise Muselier**
1990 (15th)	Clémentine Célarié	Indian Nocturne	Nocturne indien	Christine
1990 (15th)	Sabine Haudepin	Force majeure		Jeanne
1990 (15th)	Ludmila Mikaël	White Wedding	Noce blanche	Catherine Hainaut
1990 (15th)	Micheline Presle	I Want to Go Home		Isabelle Gauthier
1991 (16th)	**Dominique Blanc**	**Milou in May**	**Milou en mai**	**Claire**
1991 (16th)	Catherine Jacob	Tatie Danielle		Catherine Billard
1991 (16th)	Odette Laure	Daddy Nostalgie		Miche
1991 (16th)	Danièle Lebrun	Uranus		Mrs. Archambaud
1991 (16th)	Thérèse Liotard	My Father's Glory	La Gloire de mon père	Aunt Rose
1991 (16th)	Thérèse Liotard	My Mother's Castle	Le Château de ma mère	Aunt Rose
1992 (17th)	**Anne Brochet**	**All the Mornings of the World**	**Tous les matins du monde**	**Madeleine**
1992 (17th)	Jane Birkin	The Beautiful Troublemaker	La Belle Noiseuse	Liz Frenhofer
1992 (17th)	Catherine Jacob	Thank You Life	Merci la vie	Evangéline Pelleveau
1992 (17th)	Valérie Lemercier	L'Opération Corned-Beef		Marie-Laurence Granianski
1992 (17th)	Hélène Vincent	I Don't Kiss	J'embrasse pas	Evelyne
1993 (18th)	**Dominique Blanc**	**Indochine**		**Yvette**
1993 (18th)	Brigitte Catillon	A Heart in Winter	Un cœur en hiver	Regine
1993 (18th)	Michèle Laroque	The Crisis	La Crise	Martine
1993 (18th)	Maria Pacôme	The Crisis	La Crise	Mrs. Barelle
1993 (18th)	Zabou Breitman	The Crisis	La Crise	Isa Barelle
1994 (19th)	**Valérie Lemercier**	**The Visitors**	**Les Visiteurs**	**Frénégonde de Pouille / Béatrice de Montmirail**
1994 (19th)	Myriam Boyer	1, 2, 3, Sun	Un, deux, trois, soleil	Daniela Laspada
1994 (19th)	Judith Henry	Germinal		Catherine Maheu
1994 (19th)	Marie Trintignant	Les Marmottes		Lucie
1994 (19th)	Marthe Villalonga	My Favourite Season	Ma saison préférée	Berthe
1995 (20th)	**Virna Lisi**	**Queen Margot**	**La Reine Margot**	**Catherine de' Medici**
1995 (20th)	Dominique Blanc	Queen Margot	La Reine Margot	Henriette de Nevers
1995 (20th)	Catherine Jacob	Neuf mois		Dominique
1995 (20th)	Michèle Moretti	Wild Reeds	Les Roseaux sauvages	Madame Alvarez
1995 (20th)	Line Renaud	I Can't Sleep	J'ai pas sommeil	Ninon
1996 (21st)	**Annie Girardot**	**Les Misérables**		**Madame Thénardier**
1996 (21st)	Jacqueline Bisset	The Ceremony	La Cérémonie	Catherine Lelièvre
1996 (21st)	Clotilde Courau	Élisa		Solange
1996 (21st)	Carmen Maura	Happiness Is in the Field	Le Bonheur est dans le pré	Dolores Thivart
1996 (21st)	Claire Nadeau	Nelly and Mr. Arnaud	Nelly & Monsieur Arnaud	Jacqueline
1997 (22nd)	**Catherine Frot**	**Family Resemblances**	**Un air de famille**	**Yolande Ménard**
1997 (22nd)	Valeria Bruni Tedeschi	My Man	Mon homme	Sanguine
1997 (22nd)	Agnès Jaoui	Family Resemblances	Un air de famille	Betty Ménard
1997 (22nd)	Sandrine Kiberlain	A Self Made Hero	Un héros très discret	Yvette
1997 (22nd)	Michèle Laroque	Pédale douce		Marie Hagutte
1998 (23rd)	**Agnès Jaoui**	**Same Old Song**	**On connaît la chanson**	**Camille Lalande**
1998 (23rd)	Pascale Roberts	Marius and Jeannette	Marius et Jeannette	Caroline
1998 (23rd)	Mathilde Seigner	Dry Cleaning	Nettoyage à sec	Marylin
1998 (23rd)	Marie Trintignant	The Cousin	Le Cousin	Judge Lambert
1998 (23rd)	Karin Viard	Hikers	Les Randonneurs	Coralie
1999 (24th)	**Dominique Blanc**	**Those Who Love Me Can Take the Train**	**Ceux qui m'aiment prendront le train**	**Catherine**
1999 (24th)	Anémone	Lautrec		Countess Adèle de Toulouse-Lautrec
1999 (24th)	Arielle Dombasle	Boredom	L'Ennui	Sophie
1999 (24th)	Catherine Frot	The Dinner Game	Le Dîner de Cons	Marlène Sasseur
1999 (24th)	Emmanuelle Seigner	Place Vendôme		Nathalie

=== 2000s ===
Year	Winner and nominees	English title	Original title
2000 (25th)	**Charlotte Gainsbourg**	**Season's Beatings**	**La bûche**
2000 (25th)	Catherine Mouchet	My Little Business	Ma petite entreprise
2000 (25th)	Bulle Ogier	Venus Beauty Institute	Vénus beauté (institut)
2000 (25th)	Line Renaud	Beautiful Mother	Belle maman
2000 (25th)	Mathilde Seigner	Venus Beauty Institute	Vénus beauté (institut)
2001 (26th)	**Anne Alvaro**	**The Taste of Others**	**Le Goût des autres**
2001 (26th)	Jeanne Balibar	Tomorrow's Another Day	Ça ira mieux demain
2001 (26th)	Agnès Jaoui	The Taste of Others	Le Goût des autres
2001 (26th)	Mathilde Seigner	Harry, He's Here to Help	Harry, un ami qui vous veut du bien
2001 (26th)	Florence Thomassin	A Question of Taste	Une affaire de goût
2002 (27th)	**Annie Girardot**	**The Piano Teacher**	**La Pianiste**
2002 (27th)	Nicole Garcia	Betty Fisher and Other Stories	Betty Fisher et autres histoires
2002 (27th)	Noémie Lvovsky	My Wife Is an Actress	Ma femme est une actrice
2002 (27th)	Isabelle Nanty	Amélie	Le Fabuleux Destin d'Amélie Poulain
2002 (27th)	Line Renaud	Chaos	
2003 (28th)	**Karin Viard**	**Summer Things**	**Embrassez qui vous voudrez**
2003 (28th)	Dominique Blanc	Special Delivery	C'est le bouquet!
2003 (28th)	Danielle Darrieux	8 Women	8 femmes
2003 (28th)	Emmanuelle Devos	The Adversary	L'adversaire
2003 (28th)	Judith Godrèche	The Spanish Apartment (a.k.a. Pot Luck)	L'Auberge espagnole
2004 (29th)	**Julie Depardieu**	**Little Lili**	**La Petite Lili**
2004 (29th)	Géraldine Pailhas	The Cost of Living	Le Coût de la vie
2004 (29th)	Judith Godrèche	France Boutique	
2004 (29th)	Isabelle Nanty	Not on the Lips	Pas sur la bouche
2004 (29th)	Ludivine Sagnier	Swimming Pool	
2005 (30th)	**Marion Cotillard**	**A Very Long Engagement**	**Un long dimanche de fiançailles**
2005 (30th)	Ariane Ascaride	A Common Thread	Brodeuses
2005 (30th)	Mylène Demongeot	Department 36	36 Quai des Orfèvres
2005 (30th)	Julie Depardieu	Podium	
2005 (30th)	Émilie Dequenne	The Light	L'Équipier
2006 (31st)	**Cécile de France**	**Russian Dolls**	**Les Poupées russes**
2006 (31st)	Catherine Deneuve	Palais royal!	
2006 (31st)	Noémie Lvovsky	Backstage	
2006 (31st)	Charlotte Rampling	Lemming	
2006 (31st)	Kelly Reilly	Russian Dolls	Les Poupées russes
2007 (32nd)	**Valérie Lemercier**	**Orchestra Seats**	**Fauteuils d'orchestre**
2007 (32nd)	Christine Citti	When I Was a Singer	Quand j'étais chanteur
2007 (32nd)	Dani	Orchestra Seats	Fauteuils d'orchestre
2007 (32nd)	Mylène Demongeot	French California	La Californie
2007 (32nd)	Bernadette Lafont	I Do	Prête-moi ta main
2008 (33rd)	**Julie Depardieu**	**A Secret**	**Un secret**
2008 (33rd)	Noémie Lvovsky	Actrices	
2008 (33rd)	Bulle Ogier	Let's Dance	Faut que ça danse!
2008 (33rd)	Ludivine Sagnier	A Secret	Un secret
2008 (33rd)	Sylvie Testud	La Vie en Rose	La môme
2009 (34th)	**Elsa Zylberstein**	**I've Loved You So Long**	**Il y a longtemps que je t'aime**
2009 (34th)	Jeanne Balibar	Sagan	
2009 (34th)	Anne Consigny	A Christmas Tale	Un conte de Noël
2009 (34th)	Édith Scob	Summer Hours	L'Heure d'été
2009 (34th)	Karin Viard	Paris	

=== 2010s ===
Year	Winner and nominees	English title	Original title
2010 (35th)	**Emmanuelle Devos**	**In the Beginning**	**À l'origine**
2010 (35th)	Aure Atika	Miss Chambon	Mademoiselle Chambon
2010 (35th)	Anne Consigny	Rapt	
2010 (35th)	Audrey Dana	Welcome	
2010 (35th)	Noémie Lvovsky	The French Kissers	Les Beaux Gosses
2011 (36th)	**Anne Alvaro**	**The Clink of Ice**	**Le Bruit des glacons**
2011 (36th)	Valérie Bonneton	Little White Lies	Les Petits Mouchoirs
2011 (36th)	Laetitia Casta	Gainsbourg: A Heroic Life	Gainsbourg (Vie héroïque)
2011 (36th)	Julie Ferrier	Heartbreaker	L'Arnacœur
2011 (36th)	Karin Viard	Potiche	Potiche
2012 (37th)	**Carmen Maura**	**The Women on the 6th Floor**	**Les Femmes du 6ème étage**
2012 (37th)	Zabou Breitman	The Minister	L'Exercice de l'État
2012 (37th)	Anne Le Ny	Intouchables	
2012 (37th)	Noémie Lvovsky	House of Pleasures	L'Apollonide: Souvenirs de la maison close
2012 (37th)	Karole Rocher	Polisse	
2013 (38th)	**Valérie Benguigui**	**What's in a Name?**	**Le Prenom**
2013 (38th)	Judith Chemla	Camille Rewinds	Camille redouble
2013 (38th)	Yolande Moreau	Camille Rewinds	Camille redouble
2013 (38th)	Isabelle Huppert	Amour	
2013 (38th)	Édith Scob	Holy Motors	
2014 (39th)	**Adèle Haenel**	**Suzanne**	
2014 (39th)	Marisa Borini	A Castle in Italy	Un château en Italie
2014 (39th)	Françoise Fabian	Me, Myself and Mum	Les Garçons et Guillaume, à table!
2014 (39th)	Julie Gayet	The French Minister	Quai d'Orsay
2014 (39th)	Géraldine Pailhas	Young & Beautiful	Jeune & Jolie
2015 (40th)	**Kristen Stewart**	**Clouds of Sils Maria**	**Sils Maria**
2015 (40th)	Marianne Denicourt	Hippocrates	Hippocrate
2015 (40th)	Claude Gensac	Lulu in the Nude	Lulu femme nue
2015 (40th)	Izïa Higelin	Samba	
2015 (40th)	Charlotte Le Bon	Yves Saint Laurent	
2016 (41st)	**Sidse Babett Knudsen**	**Courted**	**L'Hermine**
2016 (41st)	Sara Forestier	Standing Tall	La Tête haute
2016 (41st)	Agnès Jaoui	The Sweet Escape	Comme un avion
2016 (41st)	Noémie Lvovsky	Summertime	La Belle Saison
2016 (41st)	Karin Viard	21 Nights with Pattie	21 nuits avec Pattie
2017 (42nd)	**Déborah Lukumuena**	**Divines**	
2017 (42nd)	Nathalie Baye	It's Only the End of the World	Juste la fin du monde
2017 (42nd)	Valeria Bruni Tedeschi	Slack Bay	Ma Loute
2017 (42nd)	Anne Consigny	Elle	
2017 (42nd)	Mélanie Thierry	The Dancer	La Danseuse
2018 (43rd)	**Sara Giraudeau**	**Bloody Milk**	**Petit Paysan**
2018 (43rd)	Laure Calamy	Ava	
2018 (43rd)	Anaïs Demoustier	The House by the Sea	La Villa
2018 (43rd)	Adèle Haenel	BPM (Beats per Minute)	120 battements par minute
2018 (43rd)	Mélanie Thierry	See You Up There	Au Revoir là-haut
2019 (44th)	**Karin Viard**	**Little Tickles**	**Les Chatouilles**
2019 (44th)	Isabelle Adjani	The World Is Yours	Le monde est à toi
2019 (44th)	Leïla Bekhti	Sink or Swim	Le Grand Bain
2019 (44th)	Virginie Efira	Sink or Swim	Le Grand Bain
2019 (44th)	Audrey Tautou	The Trouble with You	En liberté!

=== 2020s ===
Year	Winner and nominees	English title	Original title	Role
2020 (45th)	**Fanny Ardant**	**La Belle Époque**		**Marianne Drumond**
2020 (45th)	Josiane Balasko	By the Grace of God	Grâce à Dieu	Irène Thomassin
2020 (45th)	Laure Calamy	Only the Animals	Seules les bêtes	Alice
2020 (45th)	Sara Forestier	Oh Mercy!	Roubaix, une lumière	Marie
2020 (45th)	Hélène Vincent	The Specials	Hors normes	Hélène
2021 (46th)	**Émilie Dequenne**	**Love Affair(s)**	**Les Choses qu'on dit,** **les choses qu'on fait**	**Louise**
2021 (46th)	Fanny Ardant	DNA	ADN	Caroline
2021 (46th)	Valeria Bruni Tedeschi	Summer of 85	Été 85	David's mother
2021 (46th)	Noémie Lvovsky	How to Be a Good Wife	La bonne épouse	Marie-Thérèse
2021 (46th)	Yolande Moreau	How to Be a Good Wife	La bonne épouse	Gilberte Van der Beck
2022 (47th)	**Aïssatou Diallo Sagna**	**The Divide**	**La fracture**	**Kim**
2022 (47th)	Jeanne Balibar	Lost Illusions	Illusions perdues	Marquise d'Espard
2022 (47th)	Cécile de France	Lost Illusions	Illusions perdues	Louise de Bargeton
2022 (47th)	Adèle Exarchopoulos	Mandibles	Mandibules	Agnès
2022 (47th)	Danielle Fichaud	Aline		Sylvette Dieu
2023 (48th)	**Noémie Merlant**	**The Innocent**	**L'innocent**	**Clemence**
2023 (48th)	Judith Chemla	The Sixth Child	Le Sixième Enfant	Meriem
2023 (48th)	Anaïs Demoustier	November	Novembre	Ines
2023 (48th)	Anouk Grinberg	The Innocent	L'innocent	Sylvie
2023 (48th)	Lyna Khoudri	November	Novembre	Samia
2024 (49th)	**Adèle Exarchopoulos**	**All Your Faces**	**Je verrai toujours vos visages**	**Chloé Delarme**
2024 (49th)	Leïla Bekhti	All Your Faces	Je verrai toujours vos visages	Nawelle
2024 (49th)	Galatea Bellugi	Junkyard Dog	Chien de la casse	Elsa
2024 (49th)	Élodie Bouchez	All Your Faces	Je verrai toujours vos visages	Judith
2024 (49th)	Miou-Miou	All Your Faces	Je verrai toujours vos visages	Sabine
2025 (50th)	**Nina Meurisse**	**Souleymane's Story**	**L'Histoire de Souleymane**	**OFPRA agent**
2025 (50th)	Élodie Bouchez	Beating Hearts	L'Amour ouf	Clotaire's mother
2025 (50th)	Anaïs Demoustier	The Count of Monte Cristo	Le Comte de Monte-Cristo	Mercédès Herrera
2025 (50th)	Catherine Frot	Misericordia	Miséricorde	Martine Rigal
2025 (50th)	Sarah Suco	The Marching Band	En Fanfare	Sabrina
2026 (51st)	**Vimala Pons**	**The Ties That Bind Us**	**L'Attachement**	**Emillia Demetriu**
2026 (51st)	Dominique Blanc	Leave One Day	Partir un jour	Fanfan
2026 (51st)	Jeanne Balibar	Nino		Nino's mother
2026 (51st)	Marina Foïs	The Richest Woman in the World	La femme la plus riche du monde	Frédérique Spielman
2026 (51st)	Park Ji-min	The Little Sister	La Petite Dernière	Ji-Na

== Multiple wins and nominations ==
The following individuals received two or more Best Supporting Actress awards:

Wins	Actress
3	Dominique Blanc
2	Karin Viard
2	Nathalie Baye
2	Julie Depardieu
2	Annie Girardot
2	Valérie Lemercier
2	Anne Alvaro
2	Suzanne Flon
2	Marie-France Pisier

The following individuals received three or more Best Supporting Actress nominations:

Nominations	Actress
7	Noémie Lvovsky
6	Karin Viard
5	Dominique Blanc
4	Stéphane Audran
4	Jeanne Balibar
4	Catherine Frot
4	Agnès Jaoui
4	Dominique Lavanant
3	Nathalie Baye
3	Valeria Bruni Tedeschi
3	Anne Consigny
3	Danielle Darrieux
3	Anaïs Demoustier
3	Julie Depardieu
3	Catherine Jacob
3	Bernadette Lafont
3	Valérie Lemercier
3	Line Renaud
3	Mathilde Seigner
3	Marie Trintignant
3	Hélène Vincent

== See also ==
- Academy Award for Best Supporting Actress
- BAFTA Award for Best Actress in a Supporting Role
