= Coming Home (2012 film) =

2012 film

- Directed by: Frédéric Videau
- Written by: Frédéric Videau
- Produced by: Laetitia Fèvre
- Starring: Agathe Bonitzer; Reda Kateb; Hélène Fillières; Noémie Lvovsky
- Cinematography: Marc Tevanian
- Edited by: François Quiqueré
- Music by: Florent Marchet
- Distributed by: Pyramide Distribution
- Release dates: 10 February 2012 (Berlin); 4 April 2012 (France)
- Running time: 91 minutes
- Country: France
- Language: French
- Budget: $1.4 million
- Box office: $240.000

Coming Home (French: À moi seule) is 2012 French drama film directed by Frédéric Videau. The film competed in competition at the 62nd Berlin International Film Festival in February 2012.

== Cast ==
- Agathe Bonitzer as Gaëlle Faroult
- Reda Kateb as Vincent Maillard
- Hélène Fillières as Anne Morellini
- Noémie Lvovsky as Sabine Faroult
- Jacques Bonnaffé as Yves Faroult
- Grégory Gadebois as Frank
- Marie Payen as Juliette, la femme du train
- Pascal Cervo
