= Smoking/No Smoking =

- Directed by: Alain Resnais
- Written by: Agnès Jaoui; Jean-Pierre Bacri
- Produced by: Bruno Pésery; Michel Seydoux
- Starring: Sabine Azéma; Pierre Arditi
- Narrated by: Peter Hudson
- Cinematography: Renato Berta
- Edited by: Albert Jurgenson
- Music by: John Pattison
- Distributed by: Pyramide Distribution
- Release date: 15 December 1993
- Running time: 140 minutes (Smoking), 145 minutes (No Smoking)
- Country: France
- Language: French

Smoking/No Smoking is a 1993 french cinematographic work consisting of two films, released separately the same day in theaters and which can be viewed in either order.

It was directed by Alain Resnais and written by Agnès Jaoui and Jean-Pierre Bacri, from the play Intimate Exchanges by Alan Ayckbourn. The film starred Pierre Arditi and Sabine Azéma.

It won the César Award for Best Film, Best Director, Best Actor and Best Original Screenplay or Adaptation.

== Plot ==
"Smoking" and "No Smoking" are two films which are based on closely connected plays. The original plays covered eight separate stories, which have been pared down to three each for these movies. At a certain point in the story of each segment, the five female characters (all played by Sabine Azema) and the four male characters (all played by Pierre Arditi) have their lives skillfully recapped in terms of "what might have happened" if they had made or failed to make certain choices. For example, "No Smoking" focuses chiefly on the relationship between the mild-mannered Miles Coombes and his infinitely more aggressive and ambitious wife, Rowena.

The movies are set in the village of Hutton Buscel.

The narrator is voiced by Peter Hudson.

== Cast ==
- Sabine Azéma as Celia Teasdale / Sylvie Bell / Irene Pridworthy / Rowena Coombes / Josephine Hamilton
- Pierre Arditi as Toby Teasdale / Miles Coombes / Lionel Hepplewick / Joe Hepplewick

== Production ==
Principal photography began from 5 October 1992 to 22 February 1993.

== Awards and nominations ==
- Berlin Film Festival (Germany)
  - Won: Silver Bear – Outstanding Single Achievement (Alain Resnais)
  - Nominated: Golden Bear
- César Awards (France)
  - Won: Best Actor – Leading Role (Pierre Arditi)
  - Won: Best Director (Alain Resnais)
  - Won: Best Film
  - Won: Best Production Design (Jacques Saulnier)
  - Won: Best Original Screenplay or Adaptation (Jean-Pierre Bacri and Agnès Jaoui)
  - Nominated: Best Actress – Leading Role (Sabine Azéma)
  - Nominated: Best Cinematography (Renato Berta)
  - Nominated: Best Editing (Albert Jurgenson)
  - Nominated: Best Sound (Bernard Bats and Gérard Lamps)
- French Syndicate of Cinema Critics (France)
  - Won: Best Film
- Louis Delluc Prize (France)
  - Won: Best Film
