= Let It Rain (2008 film) =

- Film poster
- Directed by: Agnès Jaoui
- Written by: Agnès Jaoui; Jean-Pierre Bacri
- Starring: Jean-Pierre Bacri; Jamel Debbouze; Agnès Jaoui
- Cinematography: David Quesemand
- Edited by: François Gédigier
- Production companies: Les Films A4; France 2 Cinéma
- Distributed by: StudioCanal
- Release date: 17 September 2008
- Running time: 98 minutes
- Country: France
- Language: French
- Budget: $10.4 million
- Box office: $10.1 million

Let It Rain (French: Parlez-moi de la pluie) is a 2008 French comedy-drama film directed by Agnès Jaoui from an original screenplay by Jaoui and Jean-Pierre Bacri. It takes its title from the song L'Orage by Georges Brassens, which Jaoui heard on the way to a writing session for the fipm.

== Plot ==
The film is a comedy of middle-class French life ' examining culture clashes, puncturing smugness, exposing fault lines, finding strength in romantic and familial relationships and discovering an underlying sadness that stops some way short of tragedy.'

The film is set in a small town in Provence during a rainy August. Following the death of her widowed mother Agathe Villanova comes from Paris to deal with the sale of the home where she and her younger sister Florence were brought up, and to announce her entry into politics. She is the author of a feminist best-seller and a divorced film-maker Michel wants to make a TV documentary about her. Michel is having an affair with Agathe's sister. His collaborator is a young Algerian hotel clerk Karim, whose elderly mother has worked for most of her life as a servant with the Villanova family. Agathe's prejudice is put under the microscope when she records a series of interviews with Karim.

'The characters weave around each other for a week or so, occasionally colliding...everyone comes to have a better knowledge of themselves..the dialogue rings true..the ensemble acting is perfect..The film compares favourably with the best of Éric Rohmer.'

== Cast ==
- Jean-Pierre Bacri as Michel Ronsard
- Jamel Debbouze as Karim
- Agnes Jaoui as Agathe Villanova
- Pascale Arbillot as Florence
- Guillaume De Tonquedec as Stéphane
- Frédéric Pierrot as Antoine
