= Tout de suite maintenant =

- Film poster
- Directed by: Pascal Bonitzer
- Written by: Pascal Bonitzer; Agnès de Sacy
- Produced by: Saïd Ben Saïd; Michel Merkt
- Starring: Agathe Bonitzer; Vincent Lacoste; Lambert Wilson; Isabelle Huppert; Jean-Pierre Bacri; Pascal Greggory
- Cinematography: Julien Hirsch
- Edited by: Élise Fiévet
- Music by: Bertrand Burgalat
- Production companies: SBS Productions; France 2 Cinéma; Samsa Film
- Distributed by: Ad Vitam Distribution (France)
- Release date: 22 June 2016 (France)
- Running time: 98 minutes
- Countries: France; Luxembourg
- Language: French
- Box office: $1.2 million

Tout de suite maintenant is a 2016 Franco-Luxembourgish drama film directed and co-written by Pascal Bonitzer. It stars Agathe Bonitzer, Vincent Lacoste, Lambert Wilson, Isabelle Huppert, Jean-Pierre Bacri and Pascal Greggory.

== Plot ==
A young woman who has just joined a finance company learns that her boss and his wife were once acquainted with her father in their youth, and that animosity exists between them, for unknown reasons. A go-getter, she eventually rises through the corporate ranks, but develops a complicated relationship with a colleague who happens to be dating her sister.

== Cast ==
- Agathe Bonitzer as Nora
- Vincent Lacoste as Xavier
- Lambert Wilson as Barsac
- Isabelle Huppert as Solveig
- Jean-Pierre Bacri as Serge
- Pascal Greggory as Prévôt-Parédès
- Julia Faure as Maya
- Virgil Vernier as Zeligmann
- Yannick Renier as Van Stratten
- François Baldassare as Raoul
- Laure Roldan as Fleur
