= Agnès Jaoui =

French actress, screenwriter and singer (born 1964)

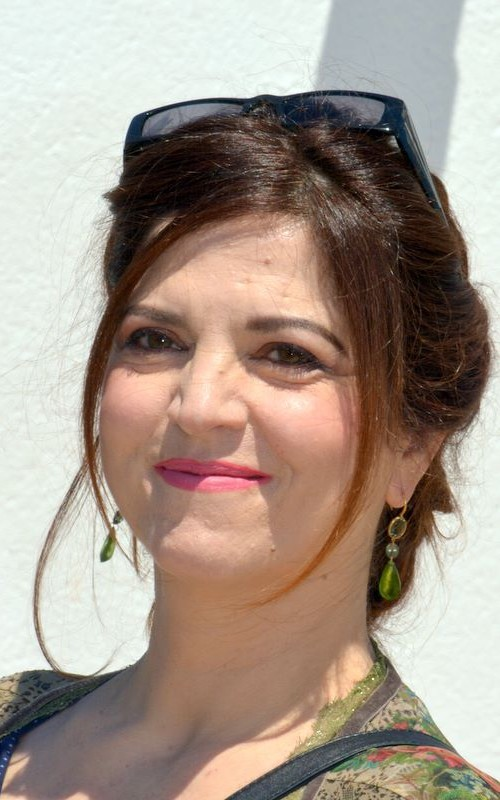
- Agnès Jaoui at the 2017 Cannes Film Festival
- Born: 19 October 1964 (age 62); Antony, France
- Education: Théâtre Nanterre-Amandiers
- Occupations: Actress, screenwriter, film director, singer
- Years active: 1983–present
- Partner: Jean-Pierre Bacri (1987‍–‍2012)
- Children: 2

Agnès Jaoui (French: [aɲɛs ʒawi]; born 19 October 1964) is a French actress, screenwriter, film director and singer.

Jaoui has won six César Awards, three Lumière Awards, and a Best Screenplay Award at the Cannes Film Festival. She has received numerous other awards and nominations, including a nomination for Academy Award for Best Foreign Language Film.

== Life and career ==
Jaoui was born in Antony, Hauts-de-Seine, and is of Tunisian Jewish descent. She is the daughter of Hubert Jaoui and Gyza Jaoui, who are both writers. They moved to Paris when she was 8 years old. She started theatre when she was in high school at the Lycée Henri-IV in Paris. She entered the Cours Florent when she was 15. Patrice Chéreau, director of the Théâtre des Amandiers in Nanterre where she began attending drama classes in 1984, gave her a role in the film Hôtel de France in 1987. That same year, she appeared in Harold Pinter's L'anniversaire with Jean-Pierre Bacri, who later became a faithful colleague and companion.

Jaoui and Bacri wrote the play Cuisine et dépendances, which Philippe Muyl adapted for the screen in 1992. In 1993, director Alain Resnais asked them to make an adaptation of Alan Ayckbourn's eight-part play Intimate Exchanges, which became the two-part film Smoking/No Smoking. This ironic diptych about free will and destiny won the César Award for Best Original Screenplay or Adaptation in 1994. In 1996, they gained greater success with Cédric Klapisch's adaptation of their play Family Resemblances (Un air de famille), which showed their ability to observe and depict everyday life, and to criticize the social norms through bitter and corrosive humor. Once again, they won the César Award for Best Original Screenplay or Adaptation in 1997, and the same year, they collaborated with Resnais again on Same Old Song (On connaît la chanson), which they wrote and performed. They won their third César Award for Best Original Screenplay or Adaptation, and Jaoui won her first César Award for Best Supporting Actress.

Jaoui directed her first feature film, The Taste of Others (Le Goût des autres, 2000, written with Bacri), which questions social-cultural identities. The film was a huge success in France and attracted 4 million spectators. It also won 4 César Awards in 2001 including Best Film and César Award for Best Original Screenplay or Adaptation, and was nominated for the Academy Award for Best Foreign Language Film. In 2004, Jaoui's second film as a director, Look at Me (Comme une image), co-written with Bacri, was selected for the Cannes Festival and won the prize for Best Screenplay. She starred in the last Richard Dembo's film, La maison de Nina (2005) and then focused on music and released her album of Latin songs, Canta (2006). She returned to cinema in 2008 with Let's Talk About the Rain (Parlez-moi de la pluie), with French humorist Jamel Debbouze in a different role from what he was used to.

In 2012, Jaoui directed Under the Rainbow (Au bout du conte), also co-written with Bacri. It revisits several fairy tales, such as Cinderella, Snow White, and Little Red Riding Hood. It received acclaim from critics and audiences for originality and humor in the writing and dialogue.

=== Music ===
Jaoui studied music in the conservatoire when she was 17, but did not start her career as a singer until 2006 when her first album Canta was released. It mixed several Latin music genres (such as flamenco, bolero, and bossa) and she sang exclusively in Spanish and Portuguese. In 2007, it won the Victoire de la Musique award for "best traditional music album".

Jaoui's second album, Dans Mon Pays, was released in 2009. It also featured Latin sonorities and songs sang in Spanish and Portuguese, except for two songs in French.

In November 2024, Jaoui directed a rare revival of Baldassare Galuppi's 1762 opera L'uomo femina at the Opéra de Dijon, which later transferred to the Opéra Royal du Château de Versailles.

== Personal life ==
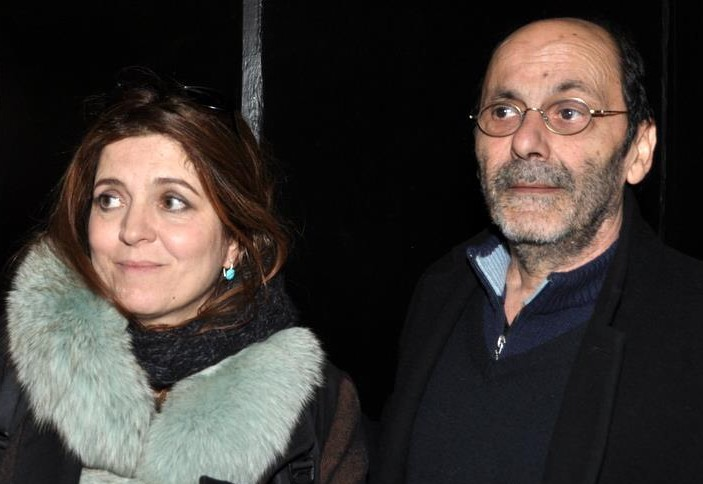
Jaoui and Jean-Pierre Bacri in 2013 at the première of Au bout du conte.

Jaoui is the daughter of Gyza Jaoui; a pioneering figure of transactional analysis, a form of psychotherapy initiated by Eric Berne. Jaoui has a brother, Laurent Jaoui, who is also a screenwriter and a director.

Jaoui was in a relationship with Jean-Pierre Bacri from 1987 to 2012. After their breakup, the two stayed on good terms and continued to work together.

Jaoui adopted two children from Brazil in 2012.

Jaoui is a member of the 50/50 collective, which aims to promote gender equality and diversity in cinema.

Several members of Jaoui's family, on her father's side, were murdered and kidnapped in the Hamas October 7 attacks.

== Filmography ==
=== As filmmaker ===
| Year | English Title | Original Title | Notes |
|---|---|---|---|
| 2000 | The Taste of Others | Le goût des autres | Co-written with Jean-Pierre Bacri |
| 2004 | Look at Me | Comme une image | Co-written with Jean-Pierre Bacri |
| 2008 | Let It Rain / Let's Talk About the Rain | Parlez-moi de la pluie | Co-written with Jean-Pierre Bacri |
| 2013 | Under the Rainbow | Au bout du conte | Co-written with Jean-Pierre Bacri |
| 2018 | Place publique | | |
| 2026 | Crescendo | L'Objet du Délit | |

==== Only writer ====
| Year | English Title | Original Title | Notes |
|---|---|---|---|
| 1993 | Cuisine et Dépendances | | |
| 1993 | Smoking/No Smoking | | Co-written with Jean-Pierre Bacri |
| 1996 | Family Resemblances | Un air de famille | Co-written with Cédric Klapisch and Jean-Pierre Bacri |
| 1997 | Same Old Song | On connaît la chanson | Co-written with Jean-Pierre Bacri |
| 2014 | The Easy Way Out | L'Art de la fugue | Co-written with Brice Cauvin and Raphaëlle Desplechin |

=== As actress ===
| Year | English title | Original title | Role | Notes |
|---|---|---|---|---|
| 1983 | Le Faucon | | Sandra | |
| 1987 | Hôtel de France | | Madame Bouguereau | |
| 1987 | L'Amoureuse | | Agathe | |
| 1990 | Ivanov | | Babakina | |
| 1991 | Canti | | | |
| 1993 | Cuisine et Dépendances | | Charlotte | |
| 1996 | Family Resemblances | Un air de famille | Betty Ménard | |
| 1997 | Le Déménagement | | Claire | |
| 1997 | Same Old Song | On connaît la chanson | Camille | |
| 1998 | Le Cousin | | Claudine Delvaux | |
| 1999 | On The Run | | Kristin | |
| 2000 | Une femme d'extérieur | | Françoise | |
| 2000 | The Taste of Others | Le Goût des autres | Mani | |
| 2003 | 24 Hours in the Life of a Woman | 24 heures dans la vie d'une femme | Marie Collins Brown | |
| 2004 | The Role of Her Life | Le Rôle de sa vie | Elisabeth Baker | |
| 2004 | Nina's House | La Maison de Nina | Nina | |
| 2004 | Look at Me | Comme une image | Sylvia Millet | |
| 2008 | Let It Rain | Parlez-moi de la pluie | Agathe Villanova | |
| 2012 | The Dandelions | Du vent dans mes mollets | Colette Gladstein | |
| 2013 | Under the Rainbow | Au bout du conte | Marianne | |
| 2014 | The Easy Way Out | L'Art de la fugue | Ariel | |
| 2015 | The Sweet Escape | Comme un avion | Laëtitia | |
| 2015 | I'm All Yours | Je suis à vous tout de suite | Simone Belkacem | |
| 2017 | Aurore | | Aurore | |
| 2018 | Place publique | | Helene | |
| 2018 | Best Intentions | Les Bonnes Intentions | Isabelle | |
| 2021 | À l'ombre des filles | | Catherine | |
| 2021 | Compagnons | | Hélène | |
| 2024 | Kaiser Karl | | Gaby Aghion | |

== Discography ==
| Year | Title |
|---|---|
| 2006 | Canta |
| 2009 | Dans Mon Pays |
| 2015 | Nostalgias |

== Awards and nominations ==
| Year | Award | Nominated work | Original title | Result | Notes |
|---|---|---|---|---|---|
| 1994 | César Award for Best Original Screenplay or Adaptation | Smoking/No Smoking | | Won | |
| 1997 | César Award for Best Original Screenplay or Adaptation | Family Resemblances | Un air de famille | Won | |
| 1997 | César Award for Best Supporting Actress | Family Resemblances | Un air de famille | Nominated | |
| 1997 | Lumière Award for Best Screenplay | Family Resemblances | Un air de famille | Won | |
| 1997 | César Award for Best Original Screenplay or Adaptation | Same Old Song | On connaît la chanson | Won | |
| 1998 | César Award for Best Supporting Actress | Same Old Song | On connaît la chanson | Won | |
| 2000 | Lumière Award for Best Film | The Taste of Others | Le Goût des autres | Won | |
| 2000 | Lumière Award for Best Director | The Taste of Others | Le Goût des autres | Won | |
| 2000 | Lumière Award for Best Screenplay | The Taste of Others | Le Goût des autres | Won | |
| 2000 | European Film Award for Best Film | The Taste of Others | Le Goût des autres | Nominated | |
| 2000 | European Film Award for Best Screenwriter | The Taste of Others | Le Goût des autres | Won | |
| 2000 | Montreal World Film Festival - Grand Prix des Amériques | The Taste of Others | Le Goût des autres | Won | |
| 2001 | César Award for Best Film | The Taste of Others | Le Goût des autres | Won | |
| 2001 | César Award for Best Original Screenplay or Adaptation | The Taste of Others | Le Goût des autres | Won | |
| 2001 | César Award for Best Supporting Actress | The Taste of Others | Le Goût des autres | Nominated | |
| 2001 | César Award for Best Director | The Taste of Others | Le Goût des autres | Nominated | |
| 2001 | Academy Award for Best Foreign Language Film | The Taste of Others | Le Goût des autres | Nominated | |
| 2001 | BIFA for Best Foreign Independent Film | The Taste of Others | Le Goût des autres | Nominated | |
| 2001 | Guldbagge Award for Best Foreign Film | The Taste of Others | Le Goût des autres | Nominated | |
| 2001 | René Clair Award | with Bacri | | Won | |
| 2004 | Cannes Film Festival - Best Screenplay | Look at Me | Comme une image | Won | |
| 2004 | European Film Award for Best Screenwriter | Look at Me | Comme une image | Won | |
| 2004 | European Film Award for Best Director | Look at Me | Comme une image | Nominated | |
| 2004 | London Film Critics' Circle Award for Screenwriter of the Year | Look at Me | Comme une image | Nominated | |
| 2005 | César Award for Best Original Screenplay or Adaptation | Look at Me | Comme une image | Nominated | |
| 2005 | Bodil Award for Best Non-American Film | Look at Me | Comme une image | Won | |
| 2007 | Victoires de la Musique — World music album of the year | Canta | | Won | |
| 2016 | César Award for Best Supporting Actress | The Sweet Escape | Comme un avion | Nominated | |
| 2024 | Honorary César | Herself | | Honored | |
