= Family Resemblances =

- Film poster
- Directed by: Cédric Klapisch
- Written by: Cédric Klapisch; Agnès Jaoui; Jean-Pierre Bacri
- Produced by: Charles Gassot
- Starring: Jean-Pierre Bacri; Jean-Pierre Darroussin; Catherine Frot; Agnès Jaoui; Claire Maurier; Wladimir Yordanoff
- Cinematography: Benoît Delhomme
- Edited by: Francine Sandberg
- Music by: Philippe Eidel
- Distributed by: BAC Films
- Release date: 6 November 1996
- Running time: 110 minutes
- Country: France
- Language: French
- Budget: €3.8 million
- Box office: $35.4 million

Family Resemblances (French: Un air de famille) is a 1996 French comedy film. It was directed by Cédric Klapisch, and written by Klapisch, Agnès Jaoui and Jean-Pierre Bacri. The film stars Bacri, Jaoui, Jean-Pierre Darroussin, Catherine Frot, Wladimir Yordanoff, Claire Maurier and Zinedine Soualem.

It won the César Award for Best Original Screenplay or Adaptation, Best Supporting Actor, and Best Supporting Actress.

== Plot ==
An average French family ostensibly celebrates a birthday in a restaurant. In one evening and during one meal, family history, tensions, collective and separate grudges, delights, and memories both clash and coalesce. Indeed, poking each other's sore spots turns out to be the main order of business. Henri (Bacri) runs a saloon that he inherited from his father called "The Even Tempered Dad," and in the near-empty bar, he plays host to several members of the family as they mark the 35th birthday of his sister-in-law, Yolande (Frot). Henri's sister, Betty (Jaoui), is 30, single, and not very happy about it; his brother (and Yolande's husband), Philippe (Yordanoff), is an executive in a growing software company; Mother (Maurier) is the siblings' strong-willed matriarch; and Henri's paralyzed dog is on hand, whom someone describes as "like a rug, but alive." It's not been a good day for most of them: Philippe is anxious that his boss might not have liked the tie he wore on television; Betty is depressed about the sad state of her current relationship; Henri has just learned that his wife is leaving him; and Mother is tossing caustic barbs at everyone left and right. Henri's bartender Denis (Darroussin) is the one neutral party on hand, and he provides the voice of reason in the midst of the bickering.

== Cast ==
- Jean-Pierre Bacri as Henri Ménard
- Jean-Pierre Darroussin as Denis
- Catherine Frot as Yolande Ménard
- Agnès Jaoui as Betty Ménard
- Claire Maurier as Mother
- Wladimir Yordanoff as Philippe Ménard
- Cédric Klapisch as Father in 1967
- Antoine Chappey as A neighbour
- Zinedine Soualem as A consumer
- Sophie Simon as Mother in 1967

== Production ==
Principal photography began on 14 August 1995 and completed shooting on 29 September 1995.

== Awards and nominations ==
- César Awards (France)
  - Won: Best Actor – Supporting Role (Jean-Pierre Darroussin)
  - Won: Best Actress – Supporting Role (Catherine Frot)
  - Won: Best Original Screenplay or Adaptation (Jean-Pierre Bacri, Agnès Jaoui and Cédric Klapisch)
  - Nominated: Best Actress – Supporting Role (Agnès Jaoui)
  - Nominated: Best Director (Cédric Klapisch)
  - Nominated: Best Film
- Gardanne Film Festival (France)
  - Won: Audience Award (Cédric Klapisch)
- Lumière Awards (France)
  - Won: Best Director (Cédric Klapisch)
  - Won: Best Screenplay (Cédric Klapisch, Jean-Pierre Bacri and Agnès Jaoui)
- Montréal Film Festival (Canada)
  - Won: Public Prize (Cédric Klapisch)
  - Won: Special Grand Prize of the Jury (Cédric Klapisch; tied with Sleeping Man (Nemuru otoko))

== Reception ==
On the review aggregator website Rotten Tomatoes, the film holds an approval rating of 89%, based on 18 reviews, with an average rating of 7.4/10.
