= Intimate Exchanges =

Play by Alan Ayckbourn

- Original language: English
- Written by: Alan Ayckbourn
- Characters: Celia Teasdale; Rowena Coombes; Sylvie Bell; Josephine Hamilton; Irene Pridworthy; Toby Teasdale; Miles Coombes; Lionel Hepplewick; Joe Hepplewick; Reg Schooner
- Subject: The consequences of seemingly trivial decisions. Marital discontent.
- Genre: Comedy
- Setting: An English country village

Premiere
- Date: 3 June 1982
- Place: Stephen Joseph Theatre (Westwood site), Scarborough
- Official website

Intimate Exchanges is a play by Alan Ayckbourn. Written between 1982 and 1983 it consists of eight major stories all originating from a single opening scene. As the play progresses the characters make choices, each of which causes the story to go in one of two directions, leading to one of 16 possible endings. The play was nominated for the 1984 Laurence Olivier Award for Best New Comedy, and a 2006 revival was nominated for the 2008 Drama Desk Award for Outstanding Play on its transfer to the Brits Off Broadway festival in New York.

In 1993, six of the eight major variations were made into the two films Smoking/No Smoking directed by Alain Resnais.

== Background ==
Ayckbourn wrote Intimate Exchanges between 1982 and 1983 to mark the 25th anniversary of his arrival in Scarborough. It may not have been written at all if most of his acting troupe had not decided to move on following a US tour. Ayckbourn was left with a summer season to fill and only two actors, Robin Herford and Lavinia Bertram. He decided to pursue a theory he had been mulling on for a few years: that the tiny, often careless choices we make in our lives can lead to vast consequences.

The idea was to write a multi-ended play in which choices lead to other choices in an increasing proliferation. Ayckbourn started writing in early 1982 with the intention of performing all of the plays over the summer months of that year. It proved to be a far greater challenge than he expected and only three of the possible variations actually opened that summer, starting with the variation called "A Cricket Match". The remaining plays came together during Autumn and Winter, finishing in February 1983 with "A Pageant".

In total, Intimate Exchanges includes 31 scenes, 16 hours of dialogue, and 10 characters, all performed by only two actors. Depending upon whether or not the character of Celia Teasdale decides to have a cigarette in the first five seconds of the play, several people might get divorced, married, start affairs, have children or die.

At Easter 1983, Robin Herford and Lavinia Bertram performed all of the sixteen possible variations over the course of twelve days. In 1984 it opened in London and was nominated for two Olivier Awards: Comedy of the Year and Comedy Performance of the Year for Lavinia Bertram. Four of the variants were also recorded for BBC radio.

Since then, the play has been produced only once more in its entirety. It was revived between 2006 and 2007 in Scarborough starring Bill Champion and Claudia Elmhirst. This production transferred to New York in 2008 as part of the "Brits Off Broadway" festival. There, it broke box office records and was nominated for two 2008 Drama Desk Awards: Outstanding Play and Outstanding Actor in a Play for Bill Champion.

Intimate Exchanges is one of the few Ayckbourn plays to have been filmed. Alain Resnais made two French films in 1993, called Smoking/No Smoking, to reflect Celia Teasdale's initial choice of whether or not to smoke a cigarette. Only twelve out the sixteen possible endings were included.

== Structure ==
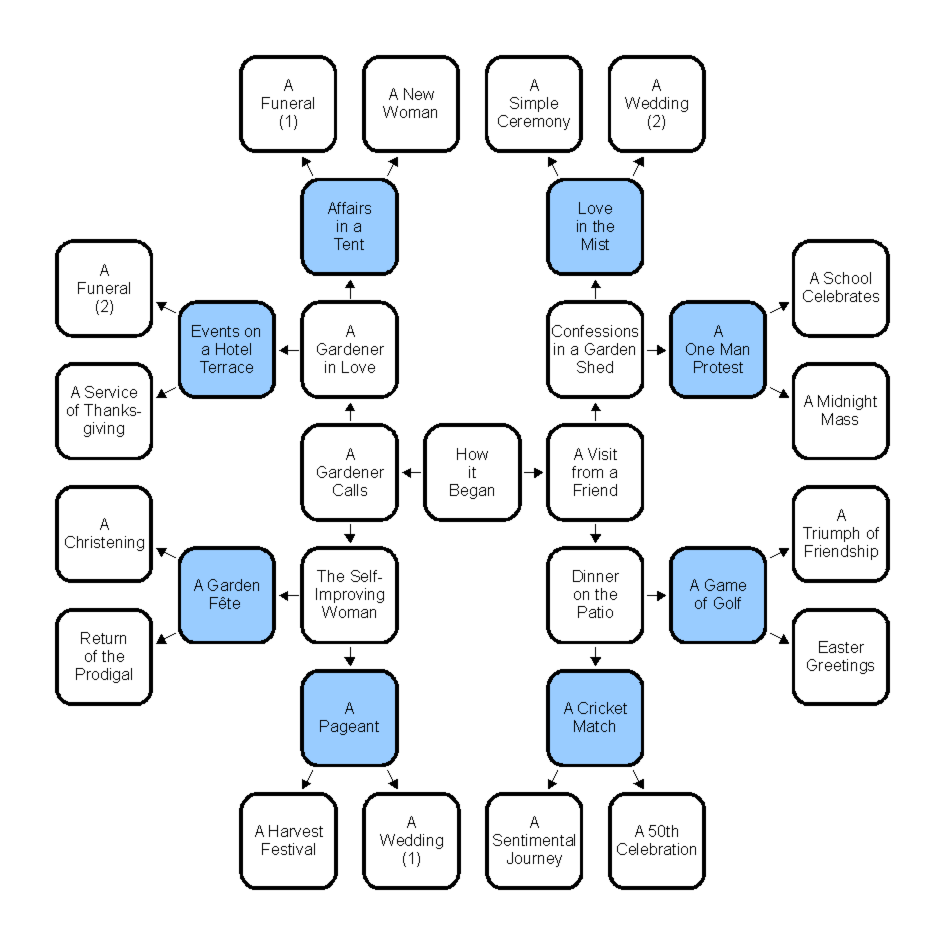
Intimate Exchanges opens with a single common scene. The narrative splits four times over the course of the play leading to one of 16 different endings

Intimate Exchanges starts with a single scene common to all of the different variations, "How it Began". This initial scene lasts only a few seconds and ends with the character of Celia Teasdale making a decision to either smoke a cigarette or to resist the temptation. The play splits into one of two directions depending upon her decision, leading to either "A Gardener Calls" or "A Visit from a Friend". During the course of the play, different characters are faced with further two-way decisions and the play splits into two different directions a total of four times, leading to 16 possible endings.

Each variation of the play is made up of 5 scenes with jumps in time between them that are common across all of the variations. After "How it Began", the second scene occurs 5 seconds later. The events of the third scene occur 5 days later. There is then an interval of 5 weeks before the fourth scene and, finally, a gap of 5 years before the fifth scene.

Each scene has its own title and Intimate Exchanges is often treated as eight different plays named after the longest scenes in the play: "Affairs in a Tent, "Events on a Hotel Terrace", "A Garden Fête", "A Pageant", "A Cricket Match", "A Game of Golf", "A One Man Protest", and "Love in the Mist". Each of these scenes opens the second half of the play.

== Characters ==
The plot of Intimate Exchanges revolves around six major characters and four minor characters, all of whom are played by just two actors. The major characters are:

- Toby Teasdale — Headmaster at a small private school
- Celia Teasdale — Toby's long-suffering wife
- Miles Coombes — Chairman of the school Board of Governors
- Rowena Coombes — Miles' wife and squash fanatic
- Lionel Hepplewick — the school caretaker
- Sylvie Bell — Toby's and Celia's home help

The minor characters, each of which appears only in one or two scenes of the play, are:

- Joe Hepplewick — Lionel's father (appears in "A Garden Fête")
- Josephine Hamilton — Celia's mother (appears in "Dinner on the Patio")
- Irene Pridworthy — a member of the school Board of Governors (appears in "Affairs in a Tent" and "A Game of Golf")
- Reg Schooner — a local cricketer (appears in "A Cricket Match")

== Synopsis ==
=== How it Began ===
The play begins in the garden of Celia and Toby Teasdale. After an unusually harsh winter, it is perhaps the first sunny day of the year. Inside the house, Celia and her "help", Sylvie Bell are busily spring cleaning. Celia emerges to fetch a step ladder from the garden shed but spies a packet of cigarettes on the table.

Celia can either:

1. Have a sneaky cigarette — Go to "A Gardener Calls"
2. Carry on with the spring cleaning – Go to "A Visit from a Friend"

=== A Gardener Calls ===
Celia sits down and lights her cigarette. Five seconds later the doorbell rings and Celia calls to Sylvie to answer it. It is Lionel Hepplewick, caretaker and groundsman of the local school where Toby is headmaster. Lionel has come to do some personal gardening for Celia.

Celia's marriage to Toby is failing and Lionel drops several unsubtle hints that he would be available, including a promise to come round on weekends to make sure her crazy paving is "properly laid". However, Lionel has already promised to take Sylvie out on a date and she wants him to commit to her.

Lionel can either:

1. Turn Sylvie down — Go to "A Gardener in Love"
2. Go out with Sylvie – Go to "The Self-Improving Woman"

=== A Visit from a Friend ===
Celia resists temptation and carries on into the shed. Five seconds later the doorbell goes, but Celia does not hear it. Instead, as she leaves the shed she is greeted by Miles Coombes coming over the fields round the back of the house. Miles is the chairman of the board of Governors at the school where Toby is headmaster.

Toby's behaviour and ability to perform his job have deteriorated to the point where the school is losing pupils. The other members of the Board want to sack Toby. Miles has come to ask Celia for reassurances that Toby will change and that she will stand by him. Celia can not imagine Toby ever changing and announces that she is about to leave him.

Miles can either:

1. Try to salvage things by suggesting a dinner party — Go to "Dinner on the Patio"
2. Forget Celia and stand by Toby on his own – Go to "Confessions in a Garden Shed"

=== A Gardener in Love ===
Five days later, Lionel is clearing out the Teasdale's shed. When Toby heads off to a school meeting, Lionel and Celia take the chance to get to know each other better. Lionel reveals that he is a master baker and Celia suggests that they start a business together.

Toby returns from his meeting and apologises to Celia for the verbal abuse he gives her, promising to change and suggesting they take an exciting and fun holiday together.

Celia can either:

1. Reject the apology and start a bakery with Lionel — Go to "Affairs in a Tent"
2. Stick with Toby and back out of her plans with Lionel – Go to "Events on a Hotel Terrace"

=== The Self-Improving Woman ===
It is the morning after Sylvie and Lionel's big date. Lionel is now clearing out the Teasdale's shed while Sylvie is tidying up their kitchen. Celia has dressed up for a coffee morning and her outfit makes an impression on Lionel. He tells Sylvie to put more effort into her appearance and to stop accepting second best in her life.

Sylvie persuades Toby to give her tuition and Celia gives her some of her old clothes. Lionel is impressed by the transformation and tells Sylvie he'd like to sleep with her again.

Sylvie can either:

1. Carry on improving herself for Lionel — Go to "A Garden Fête"
2. Dump Lionel with the rest of the trash – Go to "A Pageant"

=== Dinner on the Patio ===
Five days later, Miles drops in on Celia as she is finishing preparations for their al fresco dinner. Toby has apparently gone for cigarettes at the pub and Rowena has been delayed at a "meeting" with the school PE teacher. While waiting, Celia and Miles have a few drinks and bemoan their other halves.

As Celia starts to fret about dinner, Miles reveals that Toby has disappeared to give Miles a chance to salvage Celia's and Toby's marriage on Toby's behalf. Celia refuses to listen and she and Miles enjoy a private dinner together, culminating with Miles announcing his long-term love for Celia.

Celia can either:

1. Start an affair with Miles — Go to A Cricket Match
2. Tell Miles to go home and sort out his own marriage – Go to A Game of Golf

=== Confessions in a Garden Shed ===
Five days later, Rowena and Miles are taking a walk when it begins to rain. They seek shelter in the Teasdale's shed and have a rare opportunity to talk to one another. Rowena admits to sleeping with most of the squash club and recommends that Miles have an affair as well to rediscover his long-lost sense of adventure. Miles takes the suggestion badly so she locks him in the shed.

Sylvie, still busy cleaning up the Teasdales' house, lets Miles out and needles him for gossip. He tells her about Rowena and she agrees that he should have an affair. Miles asks Sylvie to go with him on a walk round the whole British coastline.

Sylvie can either:

1. Say no — Go to A One Man Protest
2. Say yes – Go to Love in the Mist

=== Affairs in a Tent ===
Five weeks later, Celia and Lionel are catering for the VIP tea tent at the school sports day, except that Lionel is late and Celia is stressed. Lionel finally arrives with the bread he has baked for the sandwiches, which proves to be inedible. To add to the pressure, the tomatoes and cucumber for the sandwiches get dropped on the running track and trampled.

With everything going wrong, Celia descends into madness, starting an imaginary tea party. She attacks Miles Coombes who is forced to wrap her up in a tablecloth before going for help.

Miles can either:

1. Fetch Toby — Go to A Funeral (1)
2. Fetch Lionel – Go to A New Woman

=== Events on a Hotel Terrace ===
Five weeks later, Celia and Toby are taking their first holiday together in years, but it is not the holiday Toby promised; they are recuperating in a dead-end seaside resort after Toby has suffered a suspected heart tremor. Lionel, meanwhile, has refused to take no for an answer from Celia, has followed her to the hotel and is working as a waiter.

Lionel brings out a succession of cream teas so he can talk with Celia, and Celia is forced to eat them to avoid creating a scene. Nevertheless, she is ready to give up on her husband and asks Lionel what plans he has for their future, only to learn that he is a hopeless incompetent. Utterly depressed, she descends into tears and hiccups. Toby returns from a walk and Celia recounts the whole sad affair.

Toby can either:

1. Start a fight with Lionel — Go to A Funeral (2)
2. Ignore Lionel – Go to A Service of Thanksgiving

=== A Garden Fête ===
Five weeks later, Sylvie is helping out with the village fête. She is putting herself in a set of stocks, ready to be pelted with wet sponges. Lionel, meanwhile, has been fired from his job as school caretaker after blowing up the school boiler and Sylvie is having second thoughts about their relationship.

Lionel tells Sylvie that she needs to settle down and stop wasting her time on the private tuition she is having with Toby. When she tells Toby she is packing the lessons in, he begs her not to waste her brain, pelting her in frustration.

Sylvie can either:

1. Marry Lionel and start a family — Go to A Christening
2. Strike out on her own – Go to Return of the Prodigal

=== A Pageant ===
Five weeks later, Sylvie is still receiving tuition from Toby and Toby is producing the school pageant; an open-air production recounting Boudicca's fight against the Roman forces. It is the day before the performance and Lionel still has not finished building the stage, while the woman playing Boudicca has just broken her wrist.

Celia has been asked by the play's author to take on the role of Boudicca and comes to rehearse only to find that Toby has already given the part to Sylvie. This is the last straw for Celia who is getting jealous of the time that Sylvie and Toby spend together, and is unimpressed by Toby's consequential good mood. She gets into a fight with Sylvie, knocks over Lionel's stage and ends up with a bloody nose. Sylvie professes her love for Toby.

Toby can either:

1. Run off with Sylvie — Go to A Harvest Festival
2. Stay with Celia – Go to A Wedding (1)

=== A Cricket Match ===
Five weeks later, Miles and Rowena are attending the "teachers versus pupils" cricket match. Rowena is in high spirits that Miles had the guts to start an affair and goes off to speak with some young estate agents. Celia takes the chance to speak with Miles. Although both of them are glad to be getting away from their respective other halves, neither of them is having much fun and Celia asks if Miles wants to end the affair.

Miles goes in to bat and is called out for LBW by Toby, who is umpiring the match. The two of them get into a fight over the decision and Miles gives Toby a bloody nose. Celia takes Toby off to hospital leaving Miles with Rowena.

Miles can either:

1. Send Rowena away and continue the affair with Celia — Go to A Sentimental Journey
2. End the affair and go for a walk with Rowena – Go to A 50th Celebration

=== A Game of Golf ===
Five weeks later, Miles and Toby are spending a great deal of time together. This appears to suit Toby, who is much improved and almost sober, but Celia is getting jealous.

Toby and Rowena bump into each other and Rowena asks if Miles is ever going to come home. Toby suggests that Miles does not wish to come home because of Rowena's affairs. Rowena replies that she wouldn't need to have affairs if Miles spent more time in bed with her.

Rowena accosts Miles in a bunker and tries to seduce him.

Miles can either:

1. Reignite his relationship with Rowena — Go to Easter Greetings
2. Reject Rowena's advances – Go to A Triumph of Friendship

=== A One Man Protest ===
Miles, devastated by Sylvie's rejection, has locked himself in the Teasdales' shed for the past five weeks. Celia and Sylvie have both been caring for him and Toby is fed up.

On Toby's instructions, Lionel lights a fire and prepares to smoke Miles out of the shed. Lionel is interrupted by Rowena and decides to make a pass at her. She talks him out of his trousers and then throws them on the fire as a demonstration of marital fidelity for Miles.

Miles can either:

1. Leave Rowena — Go to A Midnight Mass
2. Move back in with Rowena – Go to A School Celebrates

=== Love in the Mist ===
Five weeks later, Miles and Sylvie are walking along a coastal road. Miles is thrilled, but Sylvie is struggling and complaining that her feet hurt. She had been hoping the trip would involve a bit of romance, a bit of champagne and a private bathroom. Instead, she is getting dirty looks from the B&B staff.

The two them get lost in a sudden fog and Miles is terrorised by a passing sheep so they take shelter in a nearby builders' shed. Sylvie is soon fed up and decides to make for home. Miles stays behind until Rowena suddenly emerges through the fog. She has come with news that Sylvie's mother has fallen ill.

Miles can either:

1. Go home with Rowena — Go to A Wedding (2)
2. Carry on walking alone – Go to A Simple Ceremony

=== A Funeral (1) ===
Five years later, Toby is still caring for Celia after her mental breakdown. Lionel, meanwhile, has moved on from baking and has made a success for himself in the fast-food business.

=== A New Woman ===
Five years later, Celia has recovered from her breakdown with Lionel's support, has left Toby and is now running a gourmet freeze-dried convenience food business. Lionel has been relegated to chauffeur duties but remains totally devoted to Celia.

=== A Funeral (2) ===
It is five years later and Toby has driven himself to an early grave, never having learned to control his temper. Celia is looking forward to the chance to live her own life and is approached by Lionel who has plans to become a vicar. He asks Celia if that is good enough for her, but she turns him down again. Lionel promises to keep trying.

=== A Service of Thanksgiving ===
Five years later, Toby's verbal abuse of Celia is worse than ever and she finally makes up her mind to leave him. At that moment, Lionel returns to the village for the first time in five years having started a successful taxi business. Lionel drops a bombshell that he is now married and Celia berates herself for missing a chance at happiness.

=== A Christening ===
Five years later, Sylvie and Lionel are married and already have several children whom Sylvie has named after various literary figure. Sylvie has asked Toby to be godfather to their latest, Anne Charlotte Emily Branwell, and Toby promises that her education will begin where Sylvie's left off.

=== Return of the Prodigal ===
Five years later, Toby is preparing to give an interview to a women's magazine about his school. The journalist turns out to be Sylvie who is doing well for herself and remains happily un-married.

=== A Harvest Festival ===
Five years later, Toby and Sylvie return to the village so that Sylvie can visit her family. Toby is uncomfortable and his constant fear that Sylvie is going to leave him is putting a strain on their relationship. Sylvie bumps into Lionel who is now running an import business and asks her out to dinner. She says she might drop him a line one day.

=== A Wedding (1) ===
Five years later, Lionel and Sylvie are getting married and Sylvie and Toby remain friends. Toby and Celia's relationship has improved and she finally confides in him that she hated their wedding. Instead of being upset, Toby is overjoyed that they have found something in common.

=== A Sentimental Journey ===
Five years later, Miles and Celia are still together but are unable to find happiness. Rowena and Toby, on the other hand, are each doing very well on their own.

=== A 50th Celebration ===
Five years later, Toby's health is deteriorating and Celia is struggling to look after him. Miles approaches her but she rejects his advances..

=== Easter Greetings ===
Miles and Rowena return to the village after five years living in Australia. Toby has died from a heart attack, having returned to his old drinking regimen after Miles left.

=== A Triumph of Friendship ===
Five years later, Toby and Miles have both left their wives and are sharing a house together. Rowena took the opportunity to move to India while Celia has returned to her old career and offers Miles advice on handling Toby's continuing drinking problem.

=== A Midnight Mass ===
Miles returns to the village for the first time in five years to see Rowena and their children. Rowena is still cavorting with half the men in the village and nobody acts very excited to see him.

=== A School Celebrates ===
Five years later, Miles' boring nature is getting the better of Rowena. She is desperately struggling to keep a sense of fun in her life to the point of madness but is nevertheless now loyal to her husband.

=== A Wedding (2) ===
Five years later, Sylvie has resigned herself to a life of marriage to Lionel and starting a family. In memory of one of her many dreams of a different life that failed to become reality, she asks Miles to give her away at the wedding.

=== A Simple Ceremony ===
During his solo walk round the country, Miles fell off a cliff and died. Five years later, Rowena arranges for a shed to be dedicated to his memory. Sylvie, now married to Lionel, sits in the shed from time to time, lost in her thoughts.
