= Emmanuelle Millet =

Emmanuelle Millet is a French director and screenwriter.

== Filmography ==
- 2003 : Douce Errance
- 2005 : T'as un rôle à jouer !
- 2007 : Dix films pour en parler
- 2011 : Twiggy
