= Agathe Bonitzer =

French actress (born 1989)

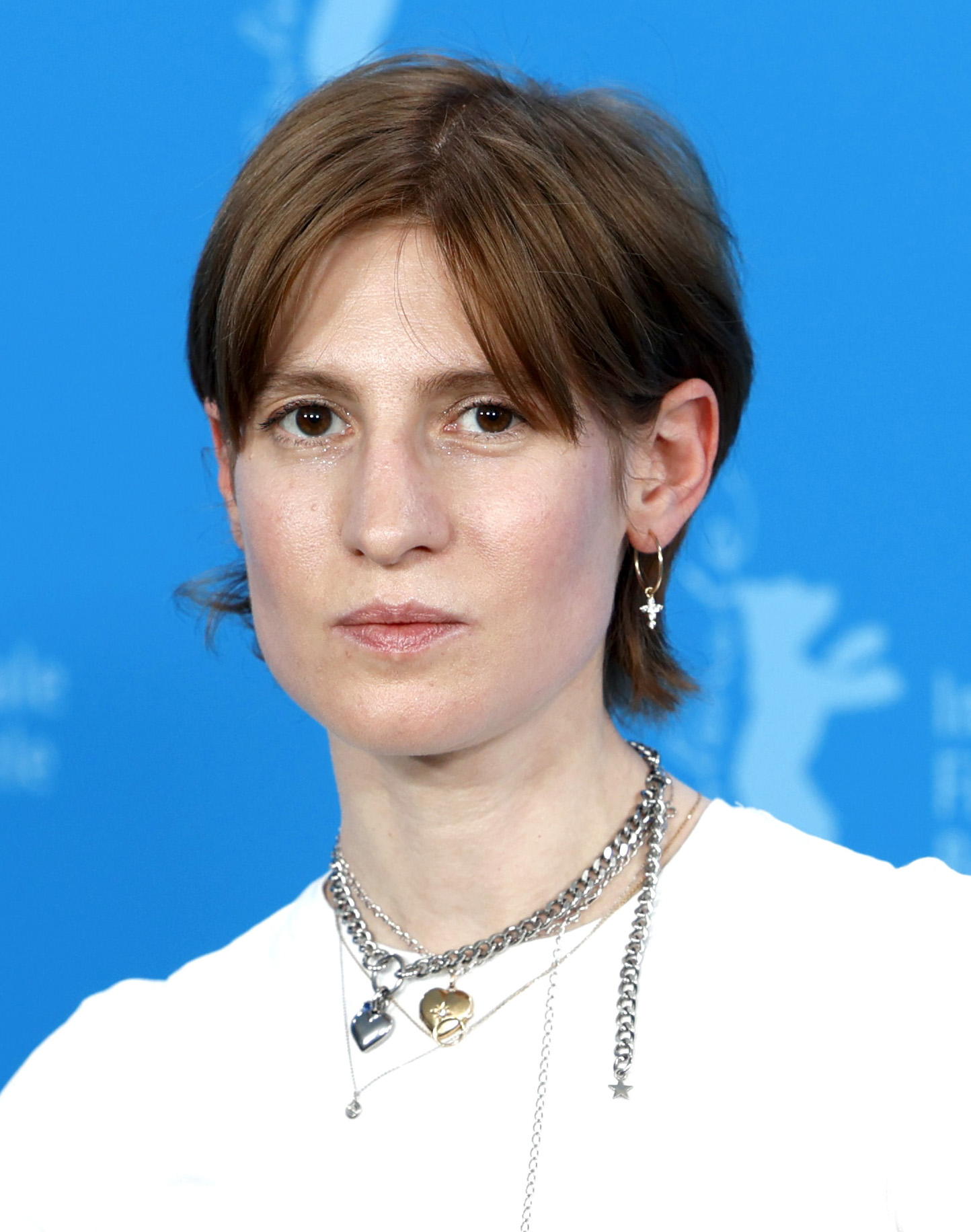
- Bonitzer in 2026
- Born: 24 April 1989 (age 36); Paris, France
- Occupation: Actress

Agathe Bonitzer (born 24 April 1989) is a French actress. She has appeared in more than twenty films since 1996.

== Career ==
In August 2018, it was announced that Bonitzer would star in the Netflix science fiction series Osmosis. The series premiered on 29 March 2019.

In 2021, she was selected as jury member for Filmmakers of the present competition section of 74th Locarno Film Festival held from 4 to 14 August.

== Personal life ==
She is the daughter of filmmakers Pascal Bonitzer and Sophie Fillières.

== Filmography ==
Year	Title	Role	Notes
1994	3000 scénarios contre un virus		TV series
1996	Three Lives and Only One Death		
2003	Small Cuts		
2003	A Man, a Real One	Luna dans les Pyrenées	
2003	Feelings	Sonia	
2006	Made in Paris	Fille Hermann	
2008	The Great Alibi	Chloé	
2008	The Beautiful Person	Marie	
2009	Un chat un chat	Anaïs	
2009	Unlikely Roommates	Ella	TV movie
2009	La morsure	Camille	Short film
2010	Bus Palladium	Myriam	
2010	Toutes les filles pleurent	La jeune chanteuse	
2010	The Three-Way Wedding	Fanny	
2011	A Bottle in the Gaza Sea	Tal Levine	
2011	Conversation avec un épouvantail	La jeune femme	Short film
2012	Climats	Isabelle Cheverny	TV movie
2012	Coming Home	Gaëlle Faroult	
2012	Nights with Théodore	Anna	TV movie
2012	Looking for Hortense	Laetitia	
2013	The Nun	Soeur Thérèse	
2013	Under the Rainbow	Laura	
2015	Valentin Valentin	Florence	
2016	Tout de suite maintenant	Nora	
2018	Blonde Animals	Katia	
2019	Osmosis	Esther Vanhove	TV series (8 episodes)
2019	Les enfants d'Isadora	first dancer	
2022	Comme une actrice	Delphine	
2023	Music	Iro	
2023	Maria Montessori	Clarisse	
2025	Affection Affectionrl	Géraldine	
2026	My Wife Cries	Carla	
