= List of The Bureau episodes =

The Bureau is a French drama series first aired on Canal+ and in France entitled Le Bureau des Légendes.

Based on actual accounts by former spies and inspired by contemporary events, The Bureau centres on the daily life and missions of spies within the DGSE (General Directorate for External Security - the French equivalent of the United States's CIA or the UK's MI6), and its department in charge of most undercover agents, known as the Bureau of Legends. Working at key locations worldwide and living under false identities (or 'legends') for years, these agents' missions are identifying potential sources.

The series focuses on French intelligence officer Guillaume "Malotru" Debailly (Mathieu Kassovitz), who returns to the French capital after six years undercover in Syria. He has to face the challenge of reconnecting with his daughter, ex-wife, colleagues, and even his old self. But returning to 'normal life' proved difficult, especially when informed that Nadia, his lover in Damascus, is also in Paris. For love, he is willing to take risks for himself and the Bureau.

== Series overview ==
| Series | Episodes | Originally released | | |
| Series | Episodes | First released | Last released | Network |
|---|---|---|---|---|
| 1 | 10 | 27 April 2015 | 25 May 2015 | Canal+ |
| 2 | 10 | 9 May 2016 | 6 June 2016 | Canal+ |
| 3 | 10 | 22 May 2017 | 19 June 2017 | Canal+ |
| 4 | 10 | 22 October 2018 | 19 November 2018 | Canal+ |
| 5 | 10 | 6 April 2020 | 5 May 2020 | Canal+ |

== Episodes ==
=== Season 1 (2015) ===
| No. overall | No. in season | Title | Directed by | Written by | Original release date |
|---|---|---|---|---|---|
| 1 | 1 | "Episode 1" | Éric Rochant | Éric Rochant | 27 April 2015 |
Agent Malotru (Debailly) is recalled to Paris after six years undercover in Damascus, and ends his affair with Nadia El Mansour. In Algiers, agent Cyclone is arrested, drunk, despite being avowedly teetotal. Debailly struggles to forget Nadia and to return to a more normal working life. He is assigned to train Marina Loiseau, who will work undercover in Iran. Debailly discovers that Nadia is in Paris and resumes contact with her. Meanwhile, agent Cyclone has gone missing in Algeria.
| 2 | 2 | "Episode 2" | Jean-Marc Moutout, Éric Rochant | Éric Rochant | 27 April 2015 |
Debailly is still under routine surveillance, while resuming his affair with Nadia under his cover identity Paul Lefevbre. He starts to question Nadia's reason for being in Paris. Meanwhile, the DGSE hires psychologist Dr Balmes, and asks her to review his state of mind. Agent Gherbi is exfiltrated from Algiers after hearing about Cyclone, and Marina continues preparing for her mission. The episode closes with a brief scene of Debailly recounting his story while connected to a polygraph.
| 3 | 3 | "Episode 3" | Jean-Marc Moutout, Éric Rochant | Éric Rochant, Camille de Castelnau, Cécile Ducrocq | 4 May 2015 |
Marina starts work at the Institute of Earth Physics. A brief scene shows Debailly, connected to a polygraph, continuing to recount his story. The DGSE interrogates Gherbi to confirm he is not also working for Algerian intelligence. Duflot's brother-in-law works undercover in the Sahel region. Meanwhile, Nadia's visits to Lefevbre arouse the suspicion of Syrian agent Nadim. Debailly digs into Nadia's background, and confronts her as to why she is really in Paris.
| 4 | 4 | "Episode 4" | Hélier Cisterne, Éric Rochant | Éric Rochant, Camille de Castelnau, Emmanuel Bourdieu | 4 May 2015 |
The episode starts with a flashforward of Debailly continuing to explain his story. Nadim investigates Paul Lefevbre, and tells Nadia not to see him again. But he finds them having dinner, and interrogates Lefevbre. Nadia confesses her true reason for being in Paris, and Debailly realises that their relationship puts her in danger. Meanwhile, Reza starts to flirt with Marina, and she has to rebuff his advances. DGSE tries to find out if the Algerians are holding Cyclone, and must stop his mother travelling there to search for him.
| 5 | 5 | "Episode 5" | Hélier Cisterne, Éric Rochant | Éric Rochant, Camille de Castelnau | 11 May 2015 |
DGSE makes contact with Algerians holding Cyclone, and Sisteron goes to Algeria. The Syrians continue to investigate Paul Lefevbre, testing him by mugging him in the street. They also seek help from the Russians. Meanwhile, DGSE puts Marina through a surprise mock interrogation. DGSE is also concerned that Cyclone's capture could have compromised the Sahel region operation, in which the Americans are involved. In flashforward, Debailly continues to recount his story to the Americans.
| 6 | 6 | "Episode 6" | Mathieu Demy, Éric Rochant | Éric Rochant, Camille de Castelnau, Emmanuel Bourdieu | 11 May 2015 |
Debailly continues to investigate the leads on Cyclone. Nadim traces Debailly's daughter Prune and starts asking about him. Marina and another agent force a colleague at the Institute to refuse the secondment to Iran. Debailly realises that the Syrians and Russians are tailing him, and finally tells Duflot about Nadia and her involvement with the Syria talks. Meanwhile, the DGSE identifies who is holding Cyclone for ransom in Algeria.
| 7 | 7 | "Episode 7" | Mathieu Demy, Éric Rochant | Éric Rochant, Camille de Castelnau | 18 May 2015 |
Debailly continues to be tailed by the Russians. The DGSE meet an Algerian with information about Cyclone. They decide to recruit Nadia; Marie-Jeanne realises that Debailly has not told her the full truth, and confronts him. She also helps Marina compel a second colleague to refuse the Iran secondment, and teaches Marina a lesson about not getting close to her contacts. Debailly continues to be interrogated by the CIA in flashforward; it is revealed that Dr Balmes works for the Americans.
| 8 | 8 | "Episode 8" | Laïla Marrakchi, Éric Rochant | Éric Rochant, Camille de Castelnau | 18 May 2015 |
Nadia refuses to betray her country, and is angry at Lefevbre's revelations. Ill from the stress of her situation, she confesses to Nadim, and is flown back to Syria. The Russian FSB confronts DGSE and buys its silence. In Algeria, DGSE fails to plant a bug on the General holding Cyclone; Cyclone is handed over to ISIS. Marina is trained to deal with interrogation by Marie-Jeanne, tested by an Iranian agent pretending to be Reza's wife, and offered the Iran secondment. In flashforward, Debailly continues to talk to the CIA; the Americans do not fully believe his story.
| 9 | 9 | "Episode 9" | Laïla Marrakchi, Éric Rochant | Éric Rochant, Camille de Castelnau | 25 May 2015 |
ISIS threatens to execute Cyclone; Debailly is asked to work on his rescue. Nadim tries to blackmail him with Nadia's life, wanting him to betray Syrian sources; Debailly refuses to do so. The Americans pull out of the Sahel operation; DGSE suspects they may have a mole. Marina is further tested before leaving for Iran. Debailly shares details of the rescue plan for Cyclone with his colleagues.
| 10 | 10 | "Episode 10" | Hélier Cisterne, Éric Rochant | Éric Rochant, Camille de Castelnau | 25 May 2015 |
Debailly asks DGSE to help Nadia, but is refused. He attracts the CIA by approaching the Syrians, purporting to represent the Americans, and takes time off to meet the CIA (revealed as the flashforwards shown from Episode Two). Dr Balmes suggests his motivation is not love for Nadia, but craving for the double life he experienced undercover. He agrees to return to the DGSE as a CIA double agent. Meanwhile, Marina disappears in Tbilisi en route to Iran, kidnapped by the Georgian secret service to see from where she seeks help. Cyclone is rescued in an ambush near the border with Mali.

=== Season 2 (2016) ===
The series was the best performing new drama on the French premium pay net since Les Revenants in 2012. It was therefore quickly renewed for a second season. Shooting started in September 2015 and ended in February 2016. The series was broadcast on Canal+ in May 2016.

| No. overall | No. in season | Title | Directed by | Written by | Original release date |
|---|---|---|---|---|---|
| 11 | 1 | "Episode 1" | Éric Rochant, Antoine Chevrollier | Éric Rochant | 9 May 2016 |
Marina begins to socialise with young Iranians, including Zamani, the son of a well-connected minister. She finds adapting to the internal politics a challenge. The Americans fail to rescue Nadia in an ambush in Lebanon. Debailly threatens to withdraw co-operation; the CIA retaliates by threatening to betray him, then asks him to make a better offer. Debailly offers to share a prospective DGSE source within Iran's nuclear industry. The DGSE discovers that one of the IS executioners, Boumaza, is a French national.
| 12 | 2 | "Episode 2" | Éric Rochant, Antoine Chevrollier | Éric Rochant | 9 May 2016 |
Debailly recalls when he first met Nadia, and continues to agonise about her fate. The CIA confirms its interest in Zamani, but Debailly and Marie-Jeanne fall out over Marina's mission; Debailly persuades Deflot to replace her with him as Marina's handler. Debailly tells Marina to get close to Zamani. The Iranian secret police take an interest in Zamani and Marina. The French Government authorises action against Boumaza; Cyclone cultivates the jihadist's family, and Sisteron poses as a supportive lawyer. Duflot continues to hunt for the mole inside the Bureau. Nadia is held prisoner in Syria.
| 13 | 3 | "Episode 3" | Samuel Collardey, Éric Rochant | Éric Rochant | 16 May 2016 |
The DGSE recruits the jihadist's sister, planning to trap and kill Boumaza. Meanwhile the Iranian secret police continues to investigate Marina, and DGSE discovers this from a source. Marina is recalled to Paris, but leaves on an expedition before receiving the message, and is arrested. In Syria, Judge Badran interrogates Nadia about her affair. Duflot suspects that Dr Balmes, who has resigned from the DGSE, may have been the CIA mole, but fails to find any evidence.
| 14 | 4 | "Episode 4" | Samuel Collardey, Éric Rochant | Éric Rochant | 16 May 2016 |
DGSE receives a report that Nadia has been executed in Syria, but the CIA has warned Debailly to anticipate false reports, and agrees to work with him in return for his Iranian source. Marina is interrogated by the Pasdaran, then released, and she returns to Paris. Duflot tells Marina not to contact Zamani, who is coming to Paris, but Debailly then tells her to contact him again. Sisteron and the sister arrange to meet Boumaza on the Syrian border, where the Turkish military intend his capture. However, the sister is communicating secretly with her brother. Meanwhile, after a mock execution, Nadia is given her 'freedom', but forced to work undercover for the Syrian government representing its rebels abroad.
| 15 | 5 | "Episode 5" | Elie Wajeman, Éric Rochant | Éric Rochant | 23 May 2016 |
Duflot discovers that Debailly disregarded his order to Marina not to contact Zamani, dismisses him for misconduct, and reinstates Marie-Jeanne as handler. But Duflot's boss decides Marina should continue cultivating Zamani. Debailly maintains contact with the CIA. Nadia, visiting France, refuses to see him. Meanwhile, Sisteron sets out with Boumaza's sister to meet the jihadist. Turkish special forces extract Sisteron, but they are ambushed by jihadists and Sisteron is captured. Too late, DGSE discovers the sister's communication with Boumaza.
| 16 | 6 | "Episode 6" | Elie Wajeman, Éric Rochant | Éric Rochant | 23 May 2016 |
Boumaza takes Sisteron into Syria. DGSE decides not to attack, to protect its local agents. He hears that Turkish forces have his sister, and exchanges Sisteron for her, after cutting off his foot. DGSE ask Debailly back unofficially to lead a team to hunt Boumaza; he plans assassination using a suicide bomber. Duflot notices, from the GPS history of Debailly's phone, the weekend when it was untraceable (when he was with the CIA). He plants a bug in Dr Balmes's office. Nadia, in Paris, is reluctant to continue her role, but Nadim forces her; she contacts the DGSE for help. Celine arranges for Nadia to meet Debailly. Meanwhile, Marina returns to Iran, tasked with recruiting Zamani. Debailly passes her reports onto the CIA.
| 17 | 7 | "Episode 7" | Laïla Marrakchi, Éric Rochant, Antoine Chevrollier | Éric Rochant | 30 May 2016 |
Continuing her meeting with Debailly, Nadia insists that DGSE help her escape from her forced role as figurehead for the Syrian rebels. Debailly decides to compromise Nadim by forging his application for asylum; he defects, and Nadia is taken away to a safe house. Debailly and Dr Balmes discover the bug in her office. The CIA stands Dr Balmes down from its service. Meanwhile, the French are close to securing Zamani as a source, only to find he has just been recruited by the CIA. Debailly continues to plan to assassinate the jihadist.
| 18 | 8 | "Episode 8" | Laïla Marrakchi, Éric Rochant, Antoine Chevrollier | Éric Rochant | 30 May 2016 |
Dulfot goes to interview Marina personally about how the CIA managed to recruit Zamani. Marie-Jeanne wants to exfiltrate Marina, but she is overruled. Zamani gets caught texting his handler from an Iranian government meeting; his arrest leads to Marina's. Meanwhile, Duflot questions Nadim about Lefevbre, but he sticks to the answers Debailly had briefed him to give. Marie-Jeanne questions Nadia. Debailly writes a farewell letter to his daughter. The DGSE identifies a German journalist with IS connections, as a way to reach Boumaza in Syria.
| 19 | 9 | "Episode 9" | Hélier Cisterne, Éric Rochant, Antoine Chevrollier | Éric Rochant | 6 June 2016 |
The suicide bomber pulls out of the mission against Boumaza, and Debailly steps into the operation, travelling to Syria but swearing his team to secrecy. He finishes his letter to Prune. DGSE hears that Marina is being interrogated by the Iranian secret police, who are torturing Zamani. The DGSE meets the CIA and insists that they identify the mole; after being threatened, the Americans name Debailly. Prune finds Debailly gone from his flat, reads his letter, and alerts the DGSE.
| 20 | 10 | "Episode 10" | Hélier Cisterne, Éric Rochant, Antoine Chevrollier | Éric Rochant | 6 June 2016 |
Duflot lectures his team about loyalty, then offers to resign, but his boss refuses to accept. The DGSE investigates Debailly's disloyalty and interviews his colleagues. Debailly takes the suicide bomber's place as cameraman for the interview with Boumaza. In Iran, the CIA has agreed to trade one of its prisoners for Marina, but the Pasdaran try to kill her after encouraging her escape. However, she evades capture and is exfiltrated to France. In Raqqa, Debailly meets and kills the jihadist, but is himself captured and made hostage. Nadia opens the letter he left her, which expresses the same feelings about their love affair that she did, in the first episode of season one.

=== Season 3 (2017) ===
| No. overall | No. in season | Title | Directed by | Written by | Original release date |
|---|---|---|---|---|---|
| 21 | 1 | "Episode 1" | Éric Rochant, Antoine Chevrollier | Éric Rochant | 22 May 2017 |
Debailly is prisoner of ISIS in Iraq. DGSE asks Nadia to negotiate his release through an intermediary Shahanah, a corrupt art dealer, and promises her an EU Deputy Commissioner position in return for her help. Sisteron is sent to Iraq to meet Kurdish fighters and rescue Debailly, but their attempt to do so during a sandstorm fails. He finds an SNCF railway points diagram left behind by ISIS, which DGSE believes is an attempt by 'Cochise', someone senior within ISIS, to communicate with them. Meanwhile Marina is working as a seismologist and is still traumatised by her experiences in Iran.
| 22 | 2 | "Episode 2" | Éric Rochant, Antoine Chevrollier | Éric Rochant | 22 May 2017 |
One of Debailly's jailers is a Russian FSB mole and offers to help him. Meanwhile, Duflot tries to help Marina overcome her trauma. Shahanah takes Nadia to meet Lely, a female intermediary for ISIS. Sisteron and Kurdish fighter Esrin are ambushed by snipers and she is injured, and flown to France for treatment. Sisteron suggests to Duflot that Esrin should be rectruited in exchange for help with her son's education. Marina, plagued by panic attacks, resigns from the DGSE. The FSB mole is seriously injured in combat.
| 23 | 3 | "Episode 3" | Samuel Collardey, Éric Rochant | Éric Rochant | 29 May 2017 |
Debailly loses hope after his FSB helper is wounded, and stops eating. Marina is approached by Oron, a Mossad agent who is posing as DGSE and wanting to recruit her. DGSE advises her to accept the offer, and report everything back to them. Shahanah requires Nadia to launder stolen artefacts from Syria in return for his help with the negotiations, but she refuses to compromise herself. The FSB mole recovers in hospital, and returns just as Debailly is being filmed for a new hostage video by ISIS.
| 24 | 4 | "Episode 4" | Samuel Collardey, Éric Rochant | Éric Rochant | 29 May 2017 |
The CIA wants to bomb the camp where Debailly might be held, but DGSE insists they wait. Duflot wants to get Debailly released before he retires, but MAG reminds him that the agency doesn't normally make much effort to rescue disloyal agents. DGSE use Prune to pressure Nadia into agreeing to resume negotiations; Nadia meets Lely again and is given the hostage video. DGSE see that the points diagram has been altered to communicate that Cochise wants to defect. Duflot volunteers to go into the field and handle both cases himself. In Iraq, the FSB spy escapes into the desert with Debailly, with ISIS in pursuit. Meanwhile, Mossad persuades Marina to speak at a seismology conference in Baku. Simon, Marina's ex who works for DGSI, offers his help if she runs into trouble.
| 25 | 5 | "Episode 5" | Elie Wajeman, Éric Rochant | Éric Rochant | 5 June 2017 |
Shahanah is murdered by the Iranians. DGSE sets up a secret meeting between Duflot and Cochise near Jarabulus, and Duflot prepares for his mission. Lely asks to meet Nadia again, and DGSE suspects ISIS may have lost Debailly; their agents in Iraq confirm he has escaped. Meanwhile ISIS catch and kill the Russian spy, but Debailly manages to evade capture.
| 26 | 6 | "Episode 6" | Elie Wajeman, Éric Rochant | Éric Rochant | 5 June 2017 |
Debailly manages to escape into the hills, and seeks help from a farmer who betrays him to ISIS, and he is recaptured. French agents identify the area where he escaped, but arrive too late. In Baku Marina gives her presentation to the conference, and is offered a job there, which Oron, the Mossad agent, urges her to take; she agrees after consulting DGSE. She panics when asked to take a polygraph, but is trained by Mossad on how to pass. In Syria, Esrin takes Duflot to his clandestine meeting with Cochise; however, Cochise is followed across the river by two of his men.
| 27 | 7 | "Episode 7" | Laïla Marrakchi, Éric Rochant, Antoine Chevrollier | Éric Rochant | 12 June 2017 |
Cochise refuses to spy for DGSE within ISIS, wanting exfiltration. Duflot agrees, if Cochise can free Debailly. Before he can return, Duflot is shot by one of Cochise's men; he is taken to hospital but later dies. Cochise obtains custody of Debailly. Meanwhile DGSE identify that Mossad plans to use Marina to infect the Iranian nuclear programme with a computer virus, which will subsequently allow them to disrupt it, via the seismic monitoring system linked to Baku. Marina panics again when she discovers the Iranian connections of her new security manager, and tries to flee but is intercepted and reassured by Oron, the Mossad agent.
| 28 | 8 | "Episode 8" | Laïla Marrakchi, Éric Rochant, Antoine Chevrollier | Éric Rochant | 12 June 2017 |
DGSE mourns the loss of Duflot. Meanwhile, Mossad gives Marina the memory stick with the virus, which DGSE manages to copy before Marina successfully introduces it into the system. In Iraq, Cochise and his ISIS fighters take Debailly toward an arranged ambush with French special forces. Before they arrive, one of them becomes suspicious and stops the convoy; the CIA makes a drone strike on the support vehicle. Cochise is wounded in the fighting; the French forces arrive in time to rescue Debailly, who is put on a ship to Libya. The CIA insist on debriefing Debailly first; DGSE reluctantly agrees on condition that Dr Balmes does the interview. Later, Debailly escapes from the ship.
| 29 | 9 | "Episode 9" | Hélier Cisterne, Éric Rochant, Antoine Chevrollier | Éric Rochant | 19 June 2017 |
DGSE discovers that Debailly is using the stolen IDs of former agents to travel back to France. Nadia hears from her assistant's Iranian contact that Debailly is free, but DGSE refuses to tell her anything; they use Prune to tempt Debailly into making contact with her. Debailly uses burner phones to contact Prune, and then gets a message to Nadia. Meanwhile, the Mossad agent tells Marina that her mission is completed. Before he leaves he realises that Marina has not been telling him the whole truth about herself, and begins to suspect that she is a spy. He confronts her and holds her captive. Marina uses their agreed code to call for Simon's help.
| 30 | 10 | "Episode 10" | Hélier Cisterne, Éric Rochant, Antoine Chevrollier | Éric Rochant | 19 June 2017 |
DGSE tracks Debailly's attempts to contact Nadia. Dr Balmes meets her, and explains how Debailly got her released from captivity. Debailly sets up a plan to meet Nadia in a hotel, contacting her via her assistant's mobile, which DGSE is already monitoring for another operation. Meanwhile, Simon tells DGSE about Marina's call for help; he suspects she is being held in the hotel, and plants a microphone in her room. The agent is told that a Mossad team is coming to deal with her, which DGSE overhears. Marina is saved at the last minute when DGSE blow her cover. In Syria, the French pull out of helping the Kurds, but leave Esrin in place; she is killed in the fighting. In France, DGSE arrive at the hotel to apprehend Debailly, but Nadia warns him using their agreed code. Nadia is taken away, and Debailly disappears into the night.

=== Season 4 (2018) ===
| No. overall | No. in season | Title | Directed by | Written by | Original release date |
|---|---|---|---|---|---|
| 31 | 1 | "Episode 1" | Pascale Ferran | Éric Rochant, Cécile Ducrocq, Camille de Castelnau, Claire Lemarechal | 22 October 2018 |
Chased by the DGSE and the CIA all the way to Moscow, Malotru tries to negotiate his return to France. The DGSE’s new head of Internal Security, JJA, initiates a full-spectrum audit of The Bureau and its new chief Marie-Jeanne, with the clear-cut intention of severing a few heads in the process.
| 32 | 2 | "Episode 2" | Anna Novion | Éric Rochant, Camille de Castelnau, Claire Lemarechal, Capucine Rochant, Vincent Mariette | 22 October 2018 |
Dumped by the DGSE, Malotru comes out of hiding and is quickly located by the Russian secret services. At the DGSE, Liz manipulates Sisteron to cause distrust between him and Marie-Jeanne. Meanwhile, Jonas begins to suspect that his mission might be hiding an ulterior motive: to ultimately eliminate the Jihadists he has been targeting.
| 33 | 3 | "Episode 3" | Antoine Chevrollier | Éric Rochant, Camille de Castelnau, Claire Lemarechal, Capucine Rochant, Gaëlle Bellan | 29 October 2018 |
Arrested for Espionage by the Russian secret services, Malotru is tossed aside and left to the mercy of other inmates. Back in France, the DGSE is striving to understand his motives before making a move. Marina’s phone has been hacked and used in a cyberattack against the Boulgakov Centre. Back in Iraq, Jonas suspects that a seemingly repentant Jihadist may be playing him to sneak his way back to France.
| 34 | 4 | "Episode 4" | Anna Novion | Éric Rochant, Quoc Dang Tran, Dominique Baumard | 29 October 2018 |
While under intense pressure from the FSB to cooperate, Malotru is considering how to approach a cyber operations officer. Back in France, Marie-Jeanne seeks Mag’s advice, only to find out that JJA had coerced him to resign and that she could very well be next. Jonas hires an expert to infiltrate an Islamist financial network.
| 35 | 5 | "Episode 5" | Antoine Chevrollier | Éric Rochant, Raphaël Chevènement, Dominique Baumard | 5 November 2018 |
Just as Karlov is beginning to lose patience, Malotru suggests recruiting Ellenstein. Back at the DGSE, Marie-Jeanne is monitoring a cyberattack, hoping to track down the person responsible for hacking Marina’s phone. Meanwhile in Mosul, Jonas and Jean-Paul are searching for a way through the ravaged city to get to the Collector.
| 36 | 6 | "Episode 6" | Laïla Marrakchi | Éric Rochant, Capucine Rochant | 5 November 2018 |
Under Karlov’s watchful gaze, Malotru initiates Ellenstein’s recruitment. At the DGSE, Sisteron suspects that César is not ready to go on a mission and will not be able to hold his legend undercover. Back in Raqqa, still under Daesh’s occupation, Jonas and Jean-Paul join a battalion of Yazidi women to track down Iode 3.
| 37 | 7 | "Episode 7" | Antoine Chevrollier | Éric Rochant, Joëlle Touma, Dominique Baumard | 12 November 2018 |
In Moscow, Malotru welcomes César, who has taken Ellenstein’s identity. Back in Damascus, the Syrian authorities refuse to let either Jonas or Jean-Paul access the morgue, where Iode 3’s body most likely lies.
| 38 | 8 | "Episode 8" | Pascale Ferran | Eric Rochant, Olivier Dujols | 12 November 2018 |
Karlov asks Malotru to join the FSB in Moscow. In Paris, Sisteron and the entire Bureau must answer to an inquiry questionnaire on Marie-Jeanne, which JJA intends to use against her during the next board meeting. Meanwhile, Marina is resenting the way the Bureau is using Misha, afraid to once again leave a trail of destruction in her wake.
| 39 | 9 | "Episode 9" | Eric Rochant | Eric Rochant, Dominique Baumard | 19 November 2018 |
Sisteron warns Marina that her cover has been blown, but that her arrest could help on another crucial assignment. Meanwhile, Malotru parts ways with Samara and comes back to France, where he is to be held in solitary confinement. Back in Syria, Jonas has lost Iode 3’s track and must turn to artificial intelligence to try and find him.
| 40 | 10 | "Episode 10" | Eric Rochant | Eric Rochant, Olivier Dujols | 19 November 2018 |
In Ukraine, Malotru arrives at the exchange location to get Marina. But on the way back, their convoy deviates from the route initially agreed upon by the DGSE, forcing him to warn Sisteron. Back in Paris, Marie-Jeanne quickly understands that Malotru’s life is at stake and confronts JJA and Ponte. Meanwhile, Jonas interrogates Iode 3 to try and prevent an impending terrorist attack in France.

=== Season 5 (2020) ===
| No. overall | No. in season | Title | Directed by | Written by | Original release date |
|---|---|---|---|---|---|
| 41 | 1 | "Episode 1" | Samuel Collardey and Anna Novion | Eric Rochant and Camille de Castelnau | 6 April 2020 |
Eight months after Malotru's alleged death, Le Figaro publishes allegations that the CIA murdered him with consent from the DGSE. JJA is now director of the Légendes office, following Marie-Jeanne's departure for the field. She now works under a fictitious identity, responsible for the security of a hotel in Cairo. The news about Malotru causes confusion among DGSE agents including Mille Sabords, a clandestine in Amman. JJA had used Sabords to further his plan for Malotru’s disappearance. The young computer whiz César ("Pacemaker") continues his mission within the FSB. He learns of Malotru's death and, like other undercover agents, panics. Seeking to leave Russia, he prepares a trip to Riga, but is intercepted by the Russian services.
| 42 | 2 | "Episode 2" | Unknown | Eric Rochant & Olivier Dujols & Camille de Castelnau . | 6 April 2020 |
Malotru wakes up in a military hospital near Moscow. One of the FSB executives, Karlov, announces to him that he has been naturalised Russian, and that he now bears the name of Pavel Lebedev. He must cooperate with the FSB by providing them with information about the DGSE. Marie-Jeanne is sent to Sinai under the protection of the Egyptian security services, to meet the head of the Bedouin tribe Tarabin about a conference which will take place in her hotel. In Paris, the Légendes office fears for Pacemaker, who has not been found. JJA announces to Ellenstein and Sisteron that Malotru is probably alive. He admits to them his strategy, which was to encourage the Russians to intervene; if successful, it would implant an agent at the heart of the Russian services. Mille Sabords, who plays the role of an arms dealer in the Middle East, travels to Yemen to meet a rebel leader, who asks him to sell him an Israeli-made computer virus. He is interrogated and threatened on his return to Saudi Arabia by a representative of the Saudi services. Mille Sabords pretends to give in by agreeing to become their informant. In Russia, Malotru, released from hospital, returns to see Samara. She tells him that a Frenchman had warned her that he would return.
| 43 | 3 | "Episode 3" | Unknown | Hippolyte Girardot & Capucine Rochant & Eric Rochant & Camille de Castelnau | 13 April 2020 |
Malotru is integrated into a Russian thinktank which is a facade of the FSB. Samara explains that a Frenchman came to see her to ask her to suggest he go jogging in a city park. Malotru sees a DGSE agent, Pépé. He indirectly receives an encrypted message from JJA, which offers him work as an underground informant in Russia. Malotru refuses. In Cairo, Marie-Jeanne agrees to recruit the son of the chief of the Tarabin tribe. Sisteron, who is now second in command at the Légendes office, goes to Cairo without notifying JJA, to find out if it was Marie-Jeanne who leaked the information to Le Figaro. The IT department of the DGSE finds César: he was taken from Russia and transported to Phnom Penh, Cambodia, where he must now supervise for two years a team of hackers who work for Russia. JJA begins to hear voices in Russian in his sleep, and sinks into paranoia.
| 44 | 4 | "Episode 4" | Unknown | Eric Rochant & Raphaël Chevènement & Dominique Baumard | 13 April 2020 |
In Paris, Liz Bernstein discovers that the sources of Le Figaro were Russian, and that Malotru had used a "methylene blue": he had transmitted to them erroneous information that the DGSE can find in the article. Marina Loiseau, now at the Centrale in charge of training and liaising with undercover agents, oversees and evaluates Mille Sabords; he will soon return to the Middle East to try to approach the Saudi secret services. Sabords asks about Malotru and his death. Mille Sabords prepares his plan: in Saudi Arabia, he must make his client, Mohammed Al Taouf, believe that he will provide him with the list of equipment that the Huthi warlord Yusuf Ahmed buys from him on behalf of the Iranians, to relaunch their nuclear programme. Malotru and Nadia El Mansour communicate discreetly, and she meets him in Moscow.
| 45 | 5 | "Episode 5" | Unknown | Eric Rochant & Cécile Ducrocq | 20 April 2020 |
In Russia, Malotru decides discreetly to send his analysis to the DGSE about Mikhail Karlov, an FSB executive. He proposed to use his exploits to turn him. If the FSB learns that he and Pacemaker are French undercover operatives introduced into the FSB through his negligence, he will be disgraced and imprisoned. To avoid this, he would surely agree to be recruited. The solution is validated by the DGSE, but it would involve exfiltrating Pacemaker; however, the information he communicates about Russia's cyber advances is too precious. In Phnom Penh, Pacemaker is working on the cyber tools of the FSB. Its mission is to infiltrate the computer network of Jusos, the "youth" branch of the German socialist party. In Cairo, Marie-Jeanne welcomes the son of the chief of the Tarabin tribe for an internship of a few months in her hotel. She does not know that the individual works for ISIS. She discovers microphones in her hotel room, and summons the Egyptian intelligence services, believing they are theirs. Jonas joins her at the hotel to investigate Daesh and meet the Bedouin sheikh.
| 46 | 6 | "Episode 6" | Unknown | Capucine Rochant & Eric Rochant | 20 April 2020 |
Marina travels to Jordan to meet Mille Sabords and entrust him with equipment that measures the uranium enrichment rate. He, in turn, meets the Saudi Mohammed Al Taouf and makes him believe that Yusuf Ahmed, the Iranian warlord, ordered 50 of the devices in order to dupe the inspectors who are investigating the supposed Iranian nuclear disarmament. Ponte, worried about JJA's paranoia and fearing that it will prevent him from making good decisions, asks Liz Bernstein to conduct a security investigation on him. JJA, who was in Moscow in the 1990s on behalf of the DGSE, had been tortured by the FSB and forced to work for Karlov, who had asked him to betray a few targets, symbolised by a series of increasingly small Russian nesting-dolls (matryoshka), representing each president of the United States, from Clinton back to Kennedy. JJA had managed to escape from Russia and has since been haunted by Russian voices in his head. Ponte agrees with JJA for the recruitment of Karlov, nicknamed "Kennedy" in reference to the last matryoshka, which JJA would have had to return to Karlov in the 1990s if he had completed his mission for the FSB. JJA can thus heal and put an end to the voices in his head.
| 47 | 7 | "Episode 7" | Unknown | Hippolyte Girardot & Eric Rochant | 27 April 2020 |
JJA travels to Russia to meet Malotru and prepare the recruitment of Kennedy. He announces that he will soon retire. JJA sends Marina to Saudi Arabia to convey to Mille Sabords that he must stop conducting research on Malotru, as he could then make it known that Malotru is alive, which would destroy Kennedy's recruitment efforts. In Cairo, Egyptian services warn Marie-Jeanne in the middle of the night that a terrorist attack will take place in her hotel. As security manager, she must ensure the safety of customers, but she understands belatedly that the intern, son of the chief of the Bedouin tribe, works with Daesh. Jonas contacts her just in time to tell her. She fights against the individual and the Egyptian services put him out of harm's way. In Cambodia, the office is implementing a plan to exfiltrate Pacemaker.
| 48 | 8 | "Episode 8" | Unknown | Eric Rochant & Dominique Baumard | 27 April 2020 |
In Moscow, Karlov is worried about the recent disappearance of Pacemaker. He goes to Phnom Penh to learn more. There, he realises that he has been tricked, that Malotru and Pacemaker are double-agents and that he is responsible for bringing both of them to work for the FSB. Alexis Bakatine, a promising young counterintelligence officer, investigates them and risks exposing the alleged betrayal of Karlov to the FSB. Back in Paris, Ponte summons JJA and announces that Mille Sabords will continue his mission, whereas JJA had wanted to get him out of Saudi Arabia, and lets him know that he must resign from the Bureau. JJA proposes to Sisteron that he take over the direction of the office upon his resignation. During his exfiltration from Moscow, Malotru improvises a plan to protect Nadia El Mansour. He arranges an appointment with Karlov and offers to recruit him.
| 49 | 9 | "Episode 9" | Jacques Audiard | Jacques Audiard & Thomas Bidegain & Eric Rochant & Cécile Ducrocq | 5 May 2020 |
Marie-Jeanne is recalled to France from her post in Egypt. She takes over the management of the Bureau of Legends after the resignation of JJA. Karlov is exfiltrated with his family to France, and his family initially believe they are on vacation. Karlov wanders through Paris and goes to an Airbnb, where he writes down an address. He hides this paper and indirectly alerts someone to its location. Karlov is then found dead, having committed suicide by jumping from his building. Malotru, also exfiltrated, is placed in a DGSE safe-house in the Perche, where he rests and is protected by an officer of the DGSE, in reality, a psychologist who is there to assess his readiness to return to work.
| 50 | 10 | "Episode 10" | Jacques Audiard | Jacques Audiard & Thomas Bidegain & Eric Rochant & Cécile Ducrocq | 5 May 2020 |
A strange man, who says he came from Uzbekistan, settles in Paris and rents the same Airbnb as the one occupied by Karlov a few days earlier. He retrieves a pistol and the paper that the latter had hidden, and finds the address of a person to be killed. For his part, in the Perche, Malotru is convinced that Karlov has found a way to take revenge one last time, even dead. He works with Sisteron at the DGSE to re-read all the files related to the Kennedy affair, but they find nothing. Jonas is worried because he suspects his girlfriend, whom he recently met, of being a 'plant'. He asks for help from Marina, who explains to him how to make sure if she is a 'plant' or not. He breaks up with her after concluding that this is indeed the case. Marie-Jeanne is appointed director of intelligence at the DGSE to replace Ponte, who is retiring. She informs him of her intention to dissolve the Bureau des légendes. Malotru celebrates his birthday in Perche with Nadia El Mansour and his daughter, Prune, who dropped philosophy to study economics and now lives with her boyfriend. After dropping Prune home, Nadia is murdered inside her car by the man hired by Karlov. The final images show the locker-room of the main "clandestine" characters in the series being destroyed.
