= The Bureau (TV series) =

French political thriller television series

- Also known as: Le Bureau des Légendes
- Genre: Spy drama
- Created by: Éric Rochant
- Written by: Éric Rochant; Camille de Castelnau; Cécile Ducrocq; Emmanuel Bourdieu
- Directed by: Éric Rochant; Mathieu Demy; Laïla Marrakchi; Hélier Cisterne; Jean-Marc Moutout; Samuel Collardey; Antoine Chevrollier; Jacques Audiard
- Starring: Mathieu Kassovitz; Sara Giraudeau; Jean-Pierre Darroussin; Florence Loiret Caille; Léa Drucker; Zineb Triki
- Country of origin: France
- Original language: French
- No. of seasons: 5
- No. of episodes: 50 (list of episodes)

Production
- Executive producers: Eric Rochant; Alex Berger; Pascal Breton
- Production locations: Paris; Morocco; Russia; Azerbaijan; Ukraine
- Running time: 52–59 minutes
- Production companies: Federation Entertainment; TOP – The Oligarchs Productions

Original release
- Network: Canal+
- Release: April 27, 2015 – May 4, 2020

The Bureau (original title: Le Bureau des Légendes) is a French espionage thriller television series created and co-written by Éric Rochant and produced by TOP – The Oligarchs Productions and Canal+, which revolves around the lives of agents of the DGSE (General Directorate of External Security), France's principal external intelligence service. Originally aired in France from 27 April 2015, it was launched in the United States and Canada on iTunes on 1 June 2016 as part of a new international "Episodic Cinema" label, quickly reaching the Top Five. In the United Kingdom, the series was released exclusively by Amazon Prime on 17 June 2016.

The first season received positive reviews in both France and other countries, and won several awards. The second season has been universally acclaimed, and has even been seen by some as the best television ever produced in France. The third and fourth seasons, respectively aired in France beginning 22 May 2017 and 22 October 2018, have met with further acclaim, with praise for the show's acting, pacing, plot and realism. The series was concluded with fifth season.

== Synopsis ==
The Bureau is based upon real accounts by former spies and inspired by contemporary events, and centres on the daily life and missions of agents within France's Directorate-General for External Security, its principal external security service. It focuses on the "Bureau of Legends", responsible for training and handling deep-cover agents (operating 'under legend') on long-term missions in areas with French interests, especially in North Africa and the Middle East. Living under false identities for years, these agents' missions are to identify and recruit good intelligence sources.

The series features intelligence officer Guillaume Debailly, codenamed "Malotru" (literally "Lout") who returns to Paris after six years undercover in Damascus. He has to face the challenge of reconnecting with his daughter, ex-wife, colleagues, and even his old self. But his return to "normal life" proves difficult, especially when he discovers that Nadia, who was his love in Damascus, is now also in Paris. The first season follows his attempts to navigate the rules of life as a spy, and his increasingly tenuous position with Nadia.

The second season continues with the same themes, four months later, but also focuses on another character from the first season, Marina Loiseau. She is leaving for Tehran to work undercover as a specialist in seismology, in order to gather intelligence about Iran's nuclear weapons programme. Malotru has been promoted to deputy director but also becomes a double agent on behalf of the CIA. He becomes increasingly desperate to resolve the situation with Nadia, which culminates in serious consequences for them both. Meanwhile, the DGSE has the challenge of a bloodthirsty French jihadist who is publicly taunting France.

Season three follows the DGSE's desperate effort to rescue Malotru from ISIS captivity, relying on a would-be ISIS defector and a costly rescue mission that ultimately claims the life of Director Henri Duflot. At the same time, Marina is drawn into a dangerous double-agent operation involving Iran's nuclear programme. Malotru ultimately escapes ISIS custody and is returned secretly to France, but evades DGSE capture.

Season four begins with Malotru fleeing to Russia, where he is captured by the FSB and coerced into helping recruit a cyber-specialist; the DGSE struggles to understand his motives. The Bureau is thrown into turmoil as the new internal security chief, JJA, launches an aggressive investigation into its activities — particularly surrounding Malotru. Syrian desk expert Jonas Maury conducts dangerous counterterrorism missions against ISIS in Iraq and Syria. The season culminates in a prisoner-exchange for Marina (also planted in Russia) that conceals a joint DGSE-CIA plan to eliminate Malotru once and for all.

Season five reveals that Malotru survived the assassination attempt; he agrees to secretly embed himself inside the FSB as part of JJA's long-term plan to recruit his former Russian handler, Karlov. César remains undercover in Russia's cyber programme and Marie-Jeanne undertakes a dangerous field assignment in Cairo. As JJA's growing paranoia — stemming from his own traumatic history with the FSB — threatens the operation, Malotru succeeds in bringing Karlov to France, but Karlov engineers one final act of revenge before taking his own life. The series ends with Nadia's assassination and Marie-Jeanne — now the Director — deciding to dismantle the Bureau des Légendes.

== Cast and characters ==
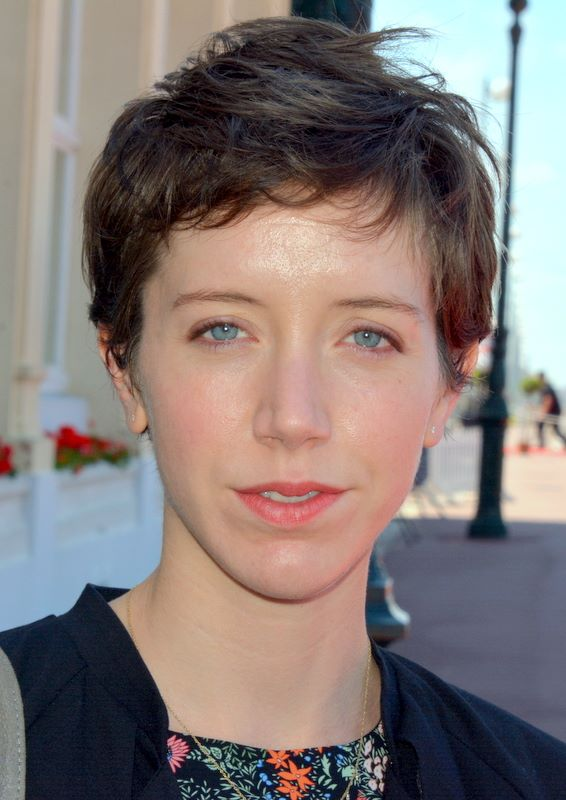
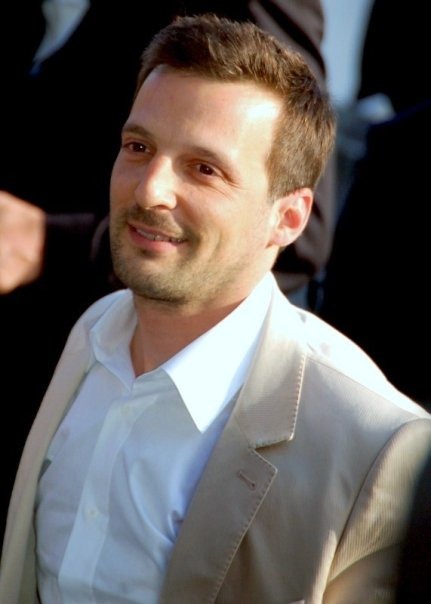
Sara Giraudeau and Mathieu Kassovitz lead the main cast of "The Bureau"

Some character codenames are based on Captain Haddock's expletives.

- Mathieu Kassovitz as Guillaume Debailly, codename "Malotru" (Lout). After six years undercover in Damascus, Syria, he returns to Paris but finds it difficult to re-adapt to a more normal life. When he learns that Nadia El Mansour, his lover in Damascus, is in Paris, he breaks the rules and renews their affair, returning to his false identity as Paul Lefebvre. (season 1– )
- Sara Giraudeau as Marina Loiseau, codename "Phénomène" (Phenomenon) later "Rocambole", a young and brilliant woman who has been cast to become the next deep-cover agent while working as a seismologist. She is under intense training to prepare an infiltration of the Iranian nuclear industry and later the Russian cybercentre. (season 1– )
- Jean-Pierre Darroussin as Henri Duflot, codename "Socrate" (Socrates), Director of the Service of Clandestines, a unit within the DGSE also known as the Bureau of Legends. (season 1–3, guest season 4-5)
- Florence Loiret Caille as Marie-Jeanne Duthilleul, Debailly's handler, who becomes Loiseau's handler after Debailly's return from Syria. During season 3, she succeeds Henri Duflot as head of the Bureau. (season 1– )
- Jonathan Zaccaï as Raymond Sisteron, a colleague of Debailly. (season 1– )
- Zineb Triki as Nadia El Mansour, a Syrian professor of history and Debailly's lover from Damascus. Their relationship and her role in seeking to resolve the Syrian conflict form the crux of the first season. (season 1–3, 5, guest season 4)
- Léa Drucker as Dr Laurène Balmes, a new recruit as a psychiatrist specialised in behavioural psychology. She assists the agents in manipulating their targets, but is also working as a double agent for the CIA. (season 1–3)
- Gilles Cohen as Colonel Marc Lauré, codename "MAG" (acronym standing for "Moule à gaufres" or Waffle iron), Director of Intelligence and Henri Duflot's boss. (season 1–4)
- Jules Sagot as Sylvain Ellenstein, a DGSE agent specialised in electronic surveillance. (season 1– )
- Alba Gaïa Bellugi as Prune Debailly, the daughter of Guillaume Debailly. (season 1–3, guest season 4-5)
- Irina Muluile as Daisy Bappé, codename "The Mule", operational support in France (field surveillance, escort, logistics). (season 1– )
- Alexandre Brasseur and Michaël Abiteboul as "Pépé" and "Mémé" (grandpa and grandma), two DGSE agents in charge of operational support (tailing, escort, logistics, intimidation). (season 1–2, 5)
- Patrick Ligardes as Marcel Gaingouin, Director of Operations of the DGSE. (season 1, guest season 2, 3, 5)
- Elodie Navarre as Emilie Duflot, the wife of Henri Duflot. (guest season 1–3)
- Jean-Marie Rollin as Edouard Rubin, a senior DGSE officer. (season 1–2)
- Rajae as Rajae Rina, the Palestinian analyst (season 1)
- Pauline Étienne as Céline Delorme, a regional expert on the Middle East and North Africa. (season 2–3)
- Mathieu Demy as Clément Migaud, head of the DGSE's Iran service. (season 2–3)
- Stefan Godin as Pierre de Lattre de Tassigny, Director General of the DGSE. (guest season 2–5)
- Alice Belaïdi as Sabrina Boumaza, sister French ISIS recruit Toufik Boumaza. (season 2)
- Artus as Jonas Maury, the Syrian analyst (season 3–4, guest season 5)
- Melisa Sözen as Esrin, a Kurdish fighter. (season 3)
- Mathieu Amalric as Jean-Jacques Angel (JJA), director of the DGSE security service (DSEC) (supposedly based on James Jesus Angleton). (season 4–5)
- Oleksiy Gorbunov as Mikhail Dmitrievich Karlov, Deputy Director of the FSB. (season 4–5)
- Anne Azoulay as Liz Bernstein, a DGSE security and counterintelligence officer. (season 4–5)
- Stefan Crepon as César, who works with Sylvain in electronic surveillance, and ends up becoming a field agent. (season 4-5)
- Maryana Spivak as Samara, the Russian love interest of Guillaime. (season 4)
- Louis Garrel as Andrea Tassone, codename "Mille Sabords". (season 5)

== Production ==
The Bureau was the brainchild of Éric Rochant, who served as showrunner and lead writer. After four-plus seasons, and not wishing to conclude the series in a "sentimental manner", Rochant handed over the writing and directorial reins to filmmaker Jacques Audiard for the last two episodes of the fifth and final season. (This decision proved controversial with fans.)

== Broadcast ==
The Bureau originally came to French television in 2015 on the premium network Canal+ with a ten-episode first season. It was an immediate critical and commercial success, becoming Canal+'s strongest-performing drama since Les Revenants and earning a rapid renewal for a second season. It was quickly renewed for a second season, broadcast in 2016, and further renewed for a third season in May 2016. The Bureau was renewed for a fourth season in April 2017 (while it was also announced that Pascal Breton's Federation Entertainment was developing a US remake of the show). In June 2019, Canal+ announced that production had begun on a ten-episode fifth season. The fifth season debuted in April 2020, with showrunner Rochant declaring it would be his last season with the show.

In the United States and Canada, the series was first launched exclusively on iTunes, on 1 June 2016, before later becoming available on other streaming platforms. In the United Kingdom, the series was released exclusively on Amazon Prime on 17 June 2016. In the United States, seasons 1-5 are now available to Amazon Prime customers, but require the purchase of either AMC Networks' Sundance Now or AMC+ premium channel additions. In Germany, it was sold to RTL Crime for broadcast in 2016. In Australia, it aired on public broadcaster SBS, and all five seasons were available on their free streaming service SBS On Demand until 30 November 2023.

== Reception ==
=== Critical reception ===
The programme was well received by audiences and critics. In its domestic market, the first season received very positive reviews. Le Monde commented on its "mastery of its subject" and "rigorous construction of narrative arcs" and lauded its "different and credible tone". Le Nouvel Observateur compared it to Mad Men and congratulated it on "staging that exceptional routine with flair and breathing life into a convincing team of heroes".

The second season was immensely popular. Télérama called it "captivating, subtly written, staged and acted: a mission accomplished" and Le Figaro stated that "to this day, this series is the best ever made in France".

The New York Times described the series as "moody, cynical & stylish ... consistently smart and understated". Broadwayworld also wrote a positive review, describing it as "a riveting spy story told with psychological sophistication and cinematic flair".

=== Awards ===
==== Season 1 ====
- Series Mania Festival 2015:
  - International Press Jury Award - Best Male Actor (Mathieu Kassovitz)
- French Syndicate of Cinema Critics Award: Best Series
- French TV Critics Association Awards (A.C.S.): Best Male Actor (Mathieu Kassovitz) (2015)

==== Season 2 ====
- COLCOA French Film Festival:
  - TV Series Jury Special Prize
  - TV Series Audience Award
- French TV Critics Association Awards (A.C.S.): Best Production (2016)
- French TV Critics Association Awards (A.C.S.): Best Female Actor (Sara Giraudeau) (2016)
- Le Parisien: Best French Series (2016)
- Télérama: Top 10 Series 2016 (N°1)
- Globes de Cristal Award: Best French Series (2016)

==== Season 3 ====
- French TV Critics Association Awards (A.C.S.): Best Series (2017)
- French TV Critics Association Awards (A.C.S.): Best Writing (2017)

==== Season 4 ====
- Télérama: Top 10 Series 2018 (N°1)

==== Season 5 ====
- TV France International: Export Fiction Award 2020
- Grand prix des Média: Best Fictional TV show 2020

== Adaptation ==
An English-language adaptation, The Agency, starring Michael Fassbender, was released in 2024. Éric Rochant, the showrunner of The Bureau, said in 2025 at the Cannes Film Festival that The Agency has no ties with him, as he is no longer under contract with Canal+ for The Bureau. Instead, he is working on another international espionage series for Canal+, Secret People.
