= 65th Venice International Film Festival =

2008 film festival in Italy

- Festival poster
- Opening film: Burn After Reading
- Location: Venice, Italy
- Founded: 1932
- Awards: Golden Lion: The Wrestler
- Hosted by: Kseniya Rappoport
- Artistic director: Marco Müller
- Festival date: 27 August – 6 September 2008
- Website: Website

Venice Film Festival chronology
- 66th 64th

The 65th annual Venice International Film Festival, was held from 27 August 2008 to 6 September 2008, at Venice Lido in Italy. The festival was dedicated to the late Egyptian filmmaker Youssef Chahine.

German filmmaker Wim Wenders was the jury president for the main competition. Russian actress Kseniya Rappoport was the Host of the opening and closing ceremonies. The Golden Lion was awarded to The Wrestler by Darren Aronofsky.

Italian filmmaker Ermanno Olmi received the Golden Lion for Lifetime Achievement during the festival.

A restored version of Federico Fellini's 1952 comedy The White Sheik, with forty minutes of newly discovered footage. The record for the longest film at the festival was broken by Lav Diaz's Melancholia, with a running time of approximately seven and a half hours, which was included in the Orizzonti competition section.

The festival opened with Burn After Reading by Joel and Ethan Coen.

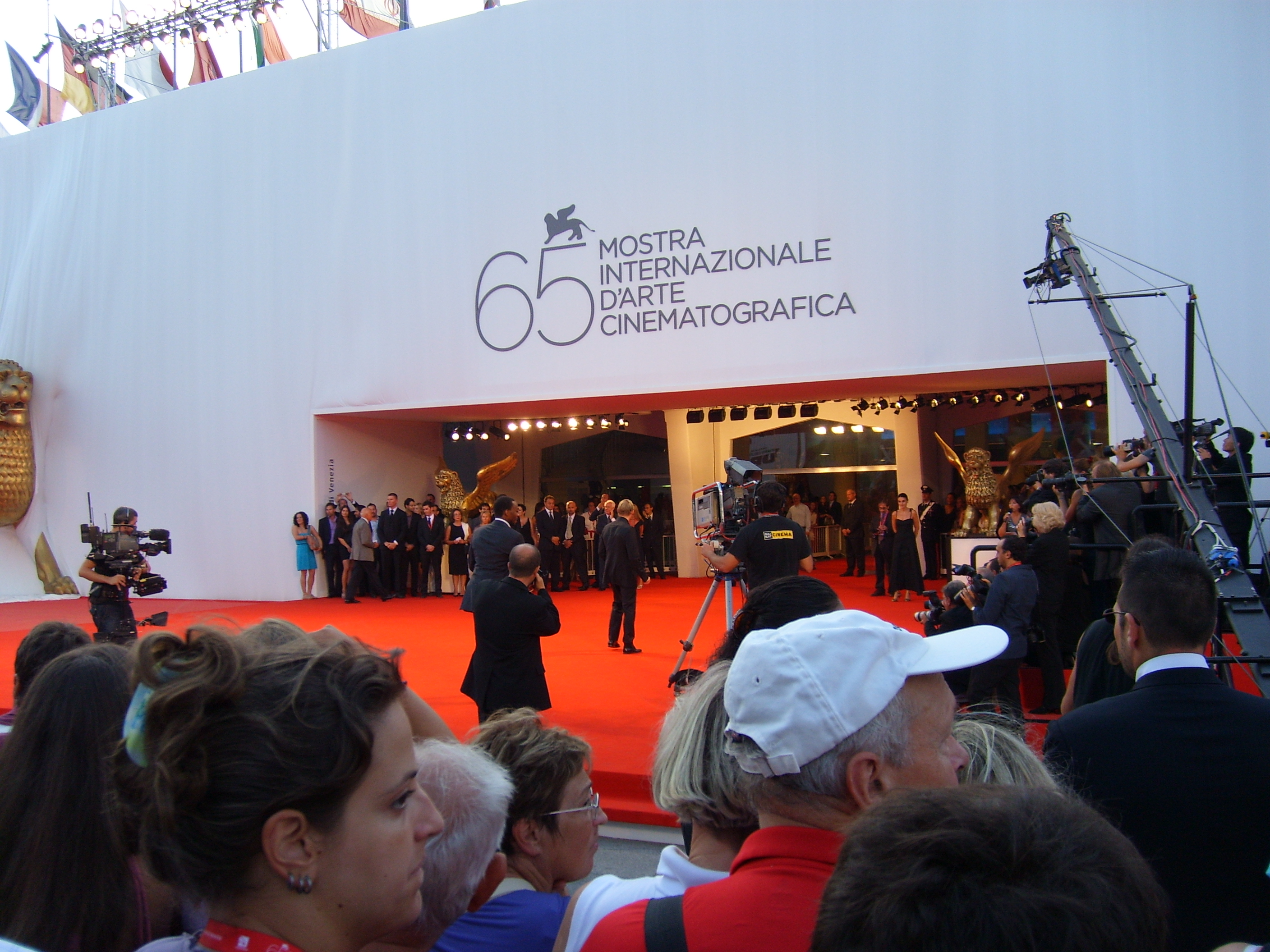
65th Venice International Film Festival

== Juries ==
=== Main Competition (Venezia 65) ===
- Wim Wenders, German filmmaker, playwright, author and photographer - Jury President
- Yuri Arabov, Russian screenwriter, writer, poet and educator
- Valeria Golino, Italian actress and director
- Douglas Gordon, Scottish artist
- John Landis, American filmmaker, actor and producer
- Lucrecia Martel, Argentine filmmaker, and producer
- Johnnie To, Hong Kong director and producer

=== Orizzonti ===
- Chantal Akerman, Belgian filmmaker, artist and professor of film - Jury President
- Nicole Brenez, French historian, theoretician and professor of cinema
- Barbara Cupisti, Italian documentary director and actress
- José Luis Guerín, Spanish filmmaker and educator
- Veiko Õunpuu, Estonian filmmaker

=== Opera Prima ("Luigi de Laurentiis" Award for a Debut Film) ===
- Abdellatif Kechiche, Tunisian-French actor, and filmmaker - Jury President
- Alice Braga, Brazilian actress
- Gregory Jacobs, American director, producer and screenwriter
- Donald Ranvaud, British producer and film journalist
- Heidrun Schleef, Italian screenwriter and producer

== Official Sections ==
=== In Competition ===
The following films were selected for the main competition:

English title	Original title	Director(s)	Production country
Achilles and the Tortoise	アキレスと亀	Takeshi Kitano	Japan
Birdwatchers	La terra degli uomini rossi	Marco Bechis	Italy, Brazil
The Burning Plain		Guillermo Arriaga	United States
Gabbla		Tariq Teguia	Algeria, France
Giovanna's Father	Il papà di Giovanna	Pupi Avati	Italy
The Hurt Locker		Kathryn Bigelow	United States
Inju: The Beast in the Shadow	Inju, la bête dans l'ombre	Barbet Schroeder	France
Jerichow		Christian Petzold	Germany
Milk	Süt	Semih Kaplanoglu	Turkey, France, Germany
The Other One	L’Autre	Patrick Mario Bernard, Pierre Trividic	France
Paper Soldier	Бумажный солдат	Aleksei German	Russia
A Perfect Day	Un giorno perfetto	Ferzan Özpetek	Italy
Plastic City	荡寇	Yu Lik-wai	Brazil, China, China（Hong Kong）, Japan
Ponyo	崖の上のポニョ	Hayao Miyazaki	Japan
Rachel Getting Married		Jonathan Demme	United States
The Seed of Discord	Il seme della discordia	Pappi Corsicato	Italy
The Sky Crawlers	スカイ·クロラ	Mamoru Oshii	Japan
Teza	ጤዛ	Haile Gerima	Ethiopia, Germany, France
This Night	Nuit de Chien	Werner Schroeter	France, Germany, Portugal
Vegas: Based on a True Story		Amir Naderi	United States
The Wrestler		Darren Aronofsky	United States, France

=== Out of Competition ===
The following films were selected to be screened out of competition:

English title	Original title	Director(s)	Production country
Feature films
35 Shots of Rum	35 Rhums	Claire Denis	France, Germany
The Beaches of Agnès	Les Plages d'Agnes	Agnès Varda	France
Burn After Reading (opening film)		Joel and Ethan Coen	United States
Embodiment of Evil	Encarnação do Demônio	Jose Mojica Marins	Brazil
Monster X Strikes Back: Attack the G8 Summit	ギララの逆襲／洞爺湖サミット危機一発	Minoru Kawasaki	Japan
Puccini and the Girl	Puccini e la fanciulla	Paolo Benvenuti	Italy
Queens of Langkasuka	ปืนใหญ่จอมสลัด	Nonzee Nimibutr	Thailand
Shirin	شیرین	Abbas Kiarostami	Iran
Vinyan		Fabrice Du Welz	France, United Kingdom, Belgium
Short films
Do Visível ao Invisível		Manoel de Oliveira	Brazil, Portugal
Cry Me a River	河上的爱情	Jia Zhangke	China, Spain, France
Vicino al Colosseo c’è Monti		Mario Monicelli	Italy
Special Event
Yuppi du		Adriano Celentano	Italy
Events
Bajo el signo de las sombras (1984)		Ferrán Alberich	Spain
Bicycle Thieves (1948)	Ladri di biciclette	Vittorio De Sica	Italy
Cairo Station (1958)	باب الحديد	Youssef Chahine	Egypt, France
Life in Shadows (1947)	Vida en Sombras	Lorenzo Llbobet Gracia	Spain
Orfeus 9 (1975)	Orfeo 9	Tito Schipa Jr.	Italy
La rabbia di Pasolini (2008)		Pier Paolo Pasolini, Giuseppe Bertolucci	Italy
Takadanobaba Duel (1937)	Kettô Takadanobaba	Masahiro Makino, Hiroshi Inagaki	Japan
Tutto è musica (1963)		Domenico Modugno	Italy
Nel blu dipinto di blu - Volare (1959)		Piero Tellini	Italy

=== Orizzonti ===
The following films were selected for the Horizons (Orizzonti) section:

English title	Original title	Director(s)	Production country
In Competition
The First Day of Winter	Il primo giorno d’inverno	Mirko Locatelli	Italy
Goodbye Solo		Ramin Bahrani	United States
The Herb of the Rat	A Erva do Rato	Julio Bressane	Brazil
I'm Gonna Explode	Voy a explotar	Gerardo Naranjo	Mexico
Jay		Francis Xavier Pasion	Philippines
Un lac		Philippe Grandrieux	France
Melancholia		Lav Diaz	Philippines
Pa-ra-da		Marco Pontecorvo	Italy, France, Romania
Parc		Arnaud des Pallières	France
Perfect Life	完美生活	Emily Tang	China, China（Hong Kong）
Khastegi	خستگی	Bahman Motamedian	Iran
Wild Field	Дикое поле	Mikheil Kalatozishvili	Russia
Zero Bridge		Tariq Tapa	India, United States
Documentaries
Below Sea Level		Gianfranco Rosi	Italy, United States
L'Exil et le royaume		Andreο Schtakleff, Jonathan Le Fourn	France
Los Herederos		Eugenio Polgovsky	Mexico
In Paraguay		Ross McElwee	United States
Puisque nous sommes nés		Jean-Pierre Duret, Andréa Santana	France, Brazil
Women		Huang Wenhai	China, Switzerland
Z32		Avi Mograbi	Israel, France
Horizons Events
Antonioni su Antonioni		Carlo Di Carlo	Italy
La fabbrica dei tedeschi		Mimmo Calopresti	Italy
Soltanto un nome nei titoli di testa		Daniele Di Biasio	Italy
ThyssenKrupp Blues		Pietro Balla, Monica Repetto	Italy
Valentino: The Last Emperor		Matt Tyrnauer	United States
Venezia '68		Antonello Sarno, Steve Della Casa	Italy
Verso Est		Laura Angiulli	Italy, Bosnia

=== Short Film Competition (Corto Cortissimo) ===
The following films were selected for the Short film competition (Corto Cortissimo) section:

English title	Original title	Director(s)	Production country
In competition
1937		Giacomo Gatti, Francesco Carrozzini	United States, Italy, France
The Altruists	De onbaatzuchtigen	Koen Dejaegher	Belgium
Ashes Engagement	Noces de cendre	Pierre Eden Simon	Belgium
The Butcher’s Shop		Philip Haas	United States
Corpus/Corpus		Christophe Loizillon	France
The Dinner	Vacsora	Karchi Perlmann	Hungary
Every Breath You Take	Vdih (working title)	Igor Sterk	Slovenia
I Don't Dream in German	Ich träume nicht auf Deutsch	Ivana Lalovic	Switzerland, Bosnia and Herzegovina
I’m in Away from Here		Catriona MacInnes	United Kingdom
Land and Bread	Tierra y Pan	Carlos Armella	Mexico
Lies	Lögner	Jonas Odell	Sweden
Mine	我的	Liu Hui	China
Sand	Zand	Joost Van Ginkel	Netherlands
The Second Coming	Teine tulemine	Tanel Toom	Estonia
The Stars Don't Twinkle in Outer Space		Peter Thwaites	United Kingdom
Ten	Dix	Bif	France, United Kingdom
We Who Stayed Behind	Vi der blev tilbage	Martin de Thurah	Denmark
When I’m 20	Khi toi 20	Dang Di Phan	Vietnam
Out of competition
Eve (Opening film)		Natalie Portman	United States
Jarred (Closing film)		Martin Gaiss	United States
Alba		Giorgia Farina	Italy
Il colore della Bassa		Giuseppe Morandi	Italy
Un canto lontano		Alberto Momo	Italy
Managua Boxing		Frediana Fornari	Italy

=== These Phantoms: Italian Cinema Rediscovered (1946-1975) ===
Retrospective screenings and restorations. Special mono-graphic sessions dedicated to the "secret story of Italian cinema". This is the fifth part of the retrospective, initiated at the 61st edition of the festival.

English title	Original title	Director(s)
Fiction
Agostino (1962)		Mauro Bolognini
Arcana (1972)		Giulio Questi
La bella di Lodi (1963)		Mario Missiroli
City of Pain (1949)	La città dolente	Mario Bonnard
The City Stands Trial (1952)	Processo alla città	Luigi Zampa
Difficult Years (1948)	Anni difficili	Luigi Zampa
The Doll That Took the Town (1956)	La donna del giorno	Francesco Maselli
The Earth Cries Out (1949)	Il grido della terra	Duilio Coletti
Fire! (1968)	Fuoco!	Gian Vittorio Baldi
Flashback (1969)		Raffaele Andreassi
A Girl... and a Million (1962)	La cuccagna	Luciano Salce
Leoni al sole (1961)		Vittorio Caprioli
Letter at Dawn (1948)	Una lettera all’alba	Giorgio Bianchi
The Lizards (1963)	I basilischi	Lina Wertmüller
A New World (1964)	Un monde nouveau	Vittorio De Sica
Oh, Grandmother's Dead (1969)	Toh è Morta la Nonna	Mario Monicelli
Opiate '67 (1963)	I Mostri	Dino Risi
Our Lady of the Turks (1968)	Nostra Signora dei Turchi	Carmelo Bene
Paris, My Love (1962)	Parigi o cara	Vittorio Caprioli
Pelle Viva		Giuseppe Fina
Revenge (1946)	Un uomo ritorna	Max Neufeld
The Sky Is Red (1950)	Il cielo è rosso	Claudio Gora
Smog (1963)		Franco Rossi
Violent Life (1962)	Una vita violenta	Paolo Heusch, Brunello Rondi
The White Sheik (1952)	Lo Sceicco Bianco	Federico Fellini
Documentaries and shorts
E il Casanova di Fellini? (1975)		Gianfranco Angelucci, Liliana Betti
Italia proibita (1963)		Enzo Biagi
La Forza e la Ragione (1971)		Roberto Rossellini
Mysteries of Rome (1963)	I misteri di Roma	(collective film)
Provini per "Il padre selvaggio" (1962)		Pier Paolo Pasolini
Spot Banca di Roma (1992)		Federico Fellini

== Independent sections ==
=== Venice International Film Critics' Week ===
The following films were selected for the 23rd International Film Critics' Week:

English title	Original title	Director(s)	Production country
In competition
The Apprentice	L'apprenti	Samuel Collardey	France
Cucumber	Huanggua / Qing gua	Zhou Yaowu	China
Kabuli Kid		Barmak Akram	France, Afghanistan
Mid-August Lunch	Pranzo di ferragosto	Gianni Di Gregorio	Italy
Nightguards	Čuvari noći	Namik Kabil	Bosnia and Herzegovina
Sell Out!		Yeo Joonhan	Malaysia
Two Lines	Iki Çizgi	Selim Evci	Turkey
Out of competition
Cold Lunch (Opening film)	Lønsj	Eva Sørhaug	Norway
Pinuccio Lovero - Sogno di una morte di mezza estate (opening film)		Pippo Mezzapesa	Italy

=== Venice Days ===
The following films were selected for the 5th edition of Venice Days (Giornate Degli Autori) autonomous section:

English title	Original title	Director(s)	Production country
In competition
One Day in a Life	Un altro pianeta	Stefano Tummolini	Italy
Broken Lines		Sallie Aprahamian	United Kingdom
Machan		Uberto Pasolini	Sri Lanka, Italy, Germany
The Visitor	Muukalainen	Jukka-Pekka Valkeapää	Finland
Nowhere Man	(N)iemand	Patrice Toye	Belgium
Hooked	Pescuit sportiv	Adrian Sitaru	Romania
Landscape No. 2	Pokrajina št. 2	Vinko Möderndorfer	Slovenia
Scratch	Rysa	Michał Rosa	Poland
A Week Alone	Una semana solos	Celina Murga	Argentina
Stella		Sylvie Verheyde	France
The Country Teacher	Venkovský učitel	Bohdan Sláma	Czech Republic
Portraits (documentaries)
Che saccio		Camille d'Arcimoles	Italy
Il passato è il mio bastone		Flavia Mastrella, Antonio Rezza	Italy
Villa degli Autori – Open Space
Adius Piero Ciampi e altre storie		Ezio Alovisi	Italy
Emilia Galotti: dal Settecento ad oggi		Alessandro Berdini	Italy
Lo stato d’eccezione		Germano Maccioni	Italy
Un paese diverso		Silvio Soldini, Giorgio Garini	Italy

== Official Awards ==
=== In Competition (Venezia 65) ===
- Golden Lion: The Wrestler by Darren Aronofsky
- Silver Lion for Best Director: Aleksei Alekseivich German for Paper Soldier
- Special Jury Prize: Teza by Haile Gerima
- Volpi Cup for Best Actor: Silvio Orlando for Giovanna's Father
- Volpi Cup for Best Actress: Dominique Blanc for The Other One
- Marcello Mastroianni Award: Jennifer Lawrence for Burning Plain
- Golden Osella for Best Cinematography: Alisher Khamidhodjaev and Maxim Drozdov for Paper Soldier
- Golden Osella for Best Screenplay: Haile Gerima for Teza
- Special Lion: Werner Schroeter

=== Horizons (Orizzonti) ===
- Best Film: Melancholia by Lav Diaz
- Best Documentary: Below Sea Level by Gianfranco Rosi
  - Special Mention: Un Lac by Philippe Grandrieux & Women by Huang Wenhai

=== Short Film Competition (Corto Cortissimo) ===
- Lion for Best Short Film: Tierra y Pan by Carlos Armella
  - Special Mention: Vacsora by Karchi Perlmann
- U.I.P. Award for Best European Short: De onbaatzuchtigen by Koen Dejaegher

=== Luigi De Laurentis Award For a Debut Film ===
- Mid-August Lunch by Gianni Di Gregorio

== Independent Sections Awards ==
=== Venice International Film Critics' Week ===
- Best Film: The Apprentice by Samuel Collardey
- Isvema Award for a debut or second feature film: Mid-August Lunch by Gianni Di Gregorio
- Doc/it Award – Special mention: The Apprentice by Samuel Collardey
- "Altre Visioni" Award: Sell Out! by Yeo Joon Han
- EIUC Human Rights Film Award: Kabuli Kid by Akram Barmak

=== Venice Days (Giornate Degli Autori) ===
- Label Europa Cinemas Award: Machan by Uberto Pasolini
- Christopher D. Smithers Foundation Special Awards: Stella by Sylvie Verheyde
- FEDIC Award: Machan by Uberto Pasolini
- Lina Mangiacapre Award: Stella by Sylvie Verheyde

== Independent Awards ==
The following collateral awards were conferred to films of the official selection:

=== FIPRESCI Award ===
- Best Film (Main competition): Gabbla by Tariq Teguia
- Best Film (Out of competition): Goodbye Solo by Ramin Bahrani

=== SIGNIS Award ===
- The Hurt Locker by Kathryn Bigelow
  - Special mention: Vegas: Based on a True Story by Amir Naderi & Teza by Haile Gerima

=== Francesco Pasinetti Award (SNGCI) ===
- Best Film: Mid-August Lunch by Gianni Di Gregorio
  - Special Mention: Pa-ra-da by Marco Pontecorvo (Out of competition)
- Best Actor: Silvio Orlando for Giovanna's Father
- Best Actress: Isabella Ferrari for Un giorno perfetto

=== Doc/it Award – Sicilia Film Commission ===
- Below Sea Level by Gianfranco Rosi

=== Leoncino d'oro Agiscuola Award ===
- Giovanna's Father by Pupi Avati

=== Queer Lion ===
- One Day in a Life by Stefano Tummolini

=== UNICEF Award ===
- Teza by Haile Gerima

=== Art Cinema Award ===
- Dikoe Pole (Wild Field) by Mikheil Kalatozishvili

=== La Navicella – Venezia Cinema Award ===
- The Hurt Locker by Kathryn Bigelow

=== C.I.C.T. UNESCO Enrico Fulchignoni Award ===
- BirdWatchers by Marco Bechis

=== Biografilm Lancia Award ===
- Best Fiction Film: Rachel Getting Married by Jonathan Demme
- Best Documentary: Below Sea Level by Gianfranco Rosi

=== Nazareno Taddei Award ===
- Giovanna's Father by Pupi Avati

=== Don Gnocchi Award ===
- Pa-ra-da by Marco Pontecorvo
  - Special mention: Ezio Greggio for Giovanna's Father

=== Future Film Festival Digital Award ===
- The Sky Crawlers by Mamoru Oshii
  - Special mention: Ponyo by Hayao Miyazaki

=== Brian Award ===
- Khastegi by Bahman Motamedian

=== Lanterna Magica Award (Cgs) ===
- Pa-ra-da by Marco Pontecorvo

=== CinemAvvenire, Best Film in Competition ===
- Vegas: Based on a True Story by Amir Naderi
  - "The circle is not round. Cinema for peace and the richness of diversity" Award: Teza by Haile Gerima

=== Bastone Bianco Award (Filmcritica) ===
- Achilles and the Tortoise by Takeshi Kitano

=== Human Rights Film Network Award ===
- The Hurt Locker by Kahryn Bigelow

=== Arca Cinemagiovani Award ===
- Best Film: The Hurt Locker by Kathryn Bigelow
- Best Italian Film: Mid-August Lunch by Gianni Di Gregorio

=== Air For Film Fest Award ===
- Pa-ra-da by Marco Pontecorvo

=== "Poveri ma belli" Award ===
- Puccini e la fanciulla by Paolo Benvenuti

=== Mimmo Rotella Foundation Award ===
- Ponyo by Hayao Miyazaki

=== Open Award 2008 ===
- The Butcher's Shop by Philip Haas
