= Brian Award =

Italian film award

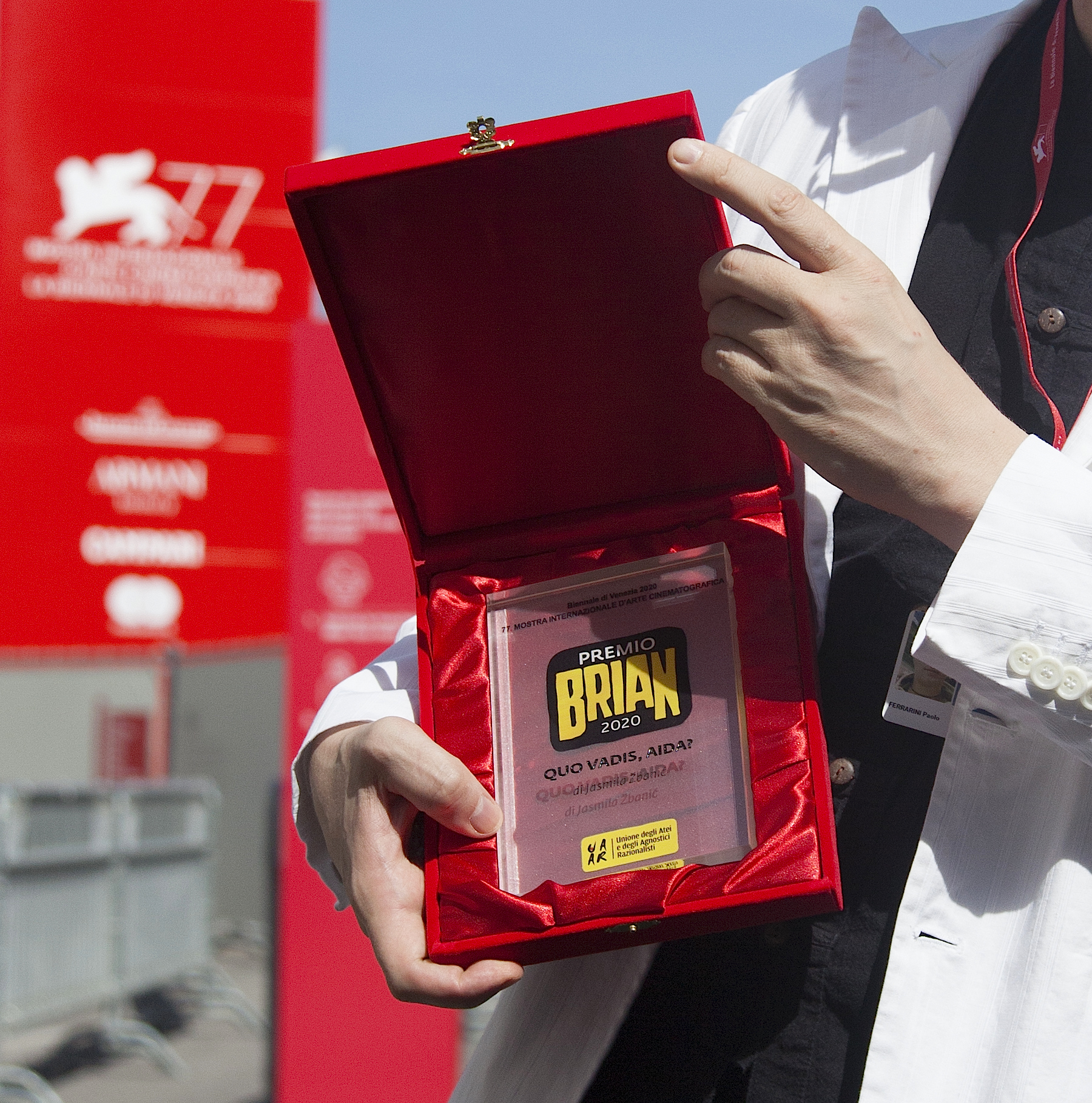
The Brian Award assigned to the film "Quo Vadis, Aida" at the 77th edition of the Venice International Film Festival

The Brian Award (in Italian: Premio Brian) is the award given since 2006 to “a film that highlights and enhances the values of rationality, respect for human rights, democracy, pluralism, promotion of individuality, freedom of conscience, expression and research, the principle of equal opportunities in public institutions for all citizens, without the frequent distinctions based on sex, gender identity, sexual orientation, religious or philosophical stands” among those presented during the Venice International Film Festival.

== History ==
The "Brian Award" was inspired by the name of the Monty Python's satire movie Life of Brian. The award initially took the form of a golden globe with glass balls inside, created by the Italian jeweler-artist Giovanni Corvaja. Later, it was a transparent plaque bearing the award's logo. The award was established by the Italian Union of Rationalist Atheists and Agnostics (member of Humanists International).

== Awards ==
Year	Winner	Director	Country
2006	Dark Blue Almost Black	Daniel Sánchez Arévalo	Spain
2007	Sympathy for the Lobster	Sabina Guzzanti	Italy
2008	Khastegi	Bahman Motamedian	Iran
2009	Lourdes	Jessica Hausner	Austria
2010	Lost Kisses	Roberta Torre	Italy
2011	The Ides of March	George Clooney	United States
2012	Dormant Beauty	Marco Bellocchio	Italy
2013	Philomena	Stephen Frears	United Kingdom
2014	The Farewell Party	Tal Granit; Sharon Maymon	Israel
2015	Spotlight	Tom McCarthy	United States
2016	Worldly Girl	Marco Danieli	Italy
2017	The Blessed	Sofia Djama	France
2018	On My Skin	Alessio Cremonini	Italy
2019	The Perfect Candidate	Haifaa Al Mansour	Saudi Arabia
2020	Quo Vadis, Aida?	Jasmila Žbanić	Bosnia and Herzegovina
2021	Happening	Audrey Diwan	France
2022	The Lord of the Ants	Gianni Amelio	Italy
2023	Tatami	Guy Nattiv, Zar Amir Ebrahimi	Georgia, United States
2024	The Room Next Door	Pedro Almodóvar	Spain
2025	La grazia	Paolo Sorrentino	Italy
2026	Let Us Through, Dear Ancestors	Lav Diaz	Philippines
