= Corvaja =

Corvaja may refer to:

== People ==
- Giovanni Corvaja (born 1971), Italian jewellery artist
- Pietro Corvaja (born 1967), Italian mathematician

== Places ==
- Palazzo Corvaja, a medieval palace in Sicily
