= Louis Delluc Prize =

French film award

The Louis Delluc Prize (French: Prix Louis-Delluc [pʁi lwi dɛlyk]) is a French film award presented annually since 1937. The award is bestowed to the Best Film and Best First Film of the year on the second week of each December. The jury is composed of 20 members, consisting of a group of film critics and figures who are culturally significant. Gilles Jacob is the president. The meeting is at le Fouquet's restaurant in Champs-Élysées.

The award was created in 1937 in view of the decision of the Académie française to award its Grand Prix du Cinema to films that were created by French filmmakers. Twenty-four film critics including Maurice Bessy and Marcel Idzkowski established the prize to honor Louis Delluc (1890–1924), the first French journalist to specialize in cinema and founder of the ciné-clubs. It is nicknamed the "Goncourt of cinema".

== Louis Delluc Prize for Best Film ==
=== 1930s ===
Year	English title	Original title	Director(s)
1937	The Lower Depths	Les Bas-fonds	Jean Renoir
1938	The Puritan	Le Puritain	Jeff Musso
1939	Port of Shadows	Le Quai des brumes	Marcel Carné

=== 1940s ===
Year	English title	Original title	Director(s)
1945	Espoir: Sierra de Teruel		André Malraux
1946	Beauty and the Beast	La Belle et la Bête	Jean Cocteau
1947	Paris 1900		Nicole Védrès
1948	The Spice of Life	Les Casse Pieds	Jean Dréville
1949	Rendezvous in July	Rendez-vous de juillet	Jacques Becker

=== 1950s ===
Year	English title	Original title	Director(s)
1950	Diary of a Country Priest	Journal d'un curé de campagne	Robert Bresson
1952	The Crimson Curtain	Le Rideau cramoisi	Alexandre Astruc
1953	Les Vacances de Monsieur Hulot	Les Vacances de M. Hulot	Jacques Tati
1954	Les Diaboliques		Henri-Georges Clouzot
1955	The Grand Maneuver	Les Grandes Manœuvres	René Clair
1956	The Red Balloon	Le Ballon rouge	Albert Lamorisse
1957	Elevator to the Gallows	Ascenseur pour l'échafaud	Louis Malle
1958	Moi, un noir		Jean Rouch
1959	No Burials on Sunday	On n'enterre pas le dimanche	Michel Drach

=== 1960s ===
Year	English title	Original title	Director(s)
1960	The Long Absence	Une aussi longue absence	Henri Colpi
1961	The Winner	Un cœur gros comme ça	François Reichenbach
1962	L'Immortelle		Alain Robbe-Grillet
1962	The Suitor	Le Soupirant	Pierre Étaix
1963	The Umbrellas of Cherbourg	Les Parapluies de Cherbourg	Jacques Demy
1964	Le Bonheur		Agnès Varda
1965	A Matter of Resistance	La Vie de château	Jean-Paul Rappeneau
1966	The War Is Over	La Guerre est finie	Alain Resnais
1967	Benjamin		Michel Deville
1968	Stolen Kisses	Baisers volés	François Truffaut
1969	The Things of Life	Les Choses de la vie	Claude Sautet

=== 1970s ===
Year	English title	Original title	Director(s)
1970	Claire's Knee	Le Genou de Claire	Éric Rohmer
1971	Rendezvous at Bray	Rendez-vous à Bray	André Delvaux
1972	State of Siege	État de siège	Costa-Gavras
1973	The Clockmaker	L'Horloger de Saint-Paul	Bertrand Tavernier
1974	The Slap	La Gifle	Claude Pinoteau
1975	Cousin Cousine		Jean-Charles Tacchella
1976	Le Juge Fayard dit Le Shériff		Yves Boisset
1977	Peppermint Soda	Diabolo menthe	Diane Kurys
1978	L'Argent des autres		Christian de Chalonge
1979	The King and the Mockingbird	Le Roi et l'Oiseau	Paul Grimault

=== 1980s ===
Year	English title	Original title	Director(s)
1980	Un étrange voyage		Alain Cavalier
1981	Strange Affair	Une étrange affaire	Pierre Granier-Deferre
1982	Danton		Andrzej Wajda
1983	À Nos Amours		Maurice Pialat
1984	Dangerous Moves	La Diagonale du fou	Richard Dembo
1985	An Impudent Girl	L'Effrontée	Claude Miller
1986	Mauvais Sang		Léos Carax
1987	Keep Your Right Up	Soigne ta droite	Jean-Luc Godard
1987	Au revoir les enfants		Louis Malle
1988	The Reader	La Lectrice	Michel Deville
1989	Love Without Pity	Un monde sans pitié	Éric Rochant

=== 1990s ===
Year	English title	Original title	Director(s)
1990	The Little Gangster	Le Petit Criminel	Jacques Doillon
1990	The Hairdresser's Husband	Le Mari de la coiffeuse	Patrice Leconte
1991	Tous les matins du monde		Alain Corneau
1992	Le Petit Prince a dit		Christine Pascal
1993	Smoking / No Smoking		Alain Resnais
1994	Wild Reeds	Les Roseaux sauvages	André Téchiné
1995	Nelly and Mr. Arnaud	Nelly et Monsieur Arnaud	Claude Sautet
1996	Will It Snow for Christmas?	Y aura-t-il de la neige à Noël ?	Sandrine Veysset
1997	Same Old Song	On connaît la chanson	Alain Resnais
1997	Marius and Jeannette	Marius et Jeannette	Robert Guédiguian
1998	L'Ennui		Cédric Kahn
1999	Farewell, Home Sweet Home	Adieu, plancher des vaches!	Otar Iosseliani

=== 2000s ===
Year	English title	Original title	Director(s)
2000	Merci pour le Chocolat		Claude Chabrol
2001	Intimacy	Intimité	Patrice Chéreau
2002	To Be and to Have	Être et avoir	Nicolas Philibert
2003	On the Run / An Amazing Couple / After the Life	Cavale / Un couple épatant / Après la vie	Lucas Belvaux
2003	Feelings	Les Sentiments	Noémie Lvovsky
2004	Kings and Queen	Rois et Reine	Arnaud Desplechin
2005	Regular Lovers	Les Amants réguliers	Philippe Garrel
2006	Lady Chatterley		Pascale Ferran
2007	The Secret of the Grain	كسكسي بالبوري / La Graine et le Mulet	Abdellatif Kechiche
2008	Modern Life	La Vie moderne	Raymond Depardon
2009	A Prophet	Un prophète	Jacques Audiard

=== 2010s ===
Year	English title	Original title	Director(s)
2010	Mysteries of Lisbon	Mistérios de Lisboa / Mystères de Lisbonne	Raúl Ruiz
2011	Le Havre		Aki Kaurismäki
2012	Farewell, My Queen	Les Adieux à la reine	Benoît Jacquot
2013	Blue Is the Warmest Colour	La Vie d'Adèle – Chapitres 1 & 2	Abdellatif Kechiche
2014	Clouds of Sils Maria	Sils Maria	Olivier Assayas
2015	Fatima		Philippe Faucon
2016	A Woman's Life	Une vie	Stéphane Brizé
2017	Barbara		Mathieu Amalric
2018	Sorry Angel	Plaire, aimer et courir vite	Christophe Honoré
2019	Joan of Arc	Jeanne	Bruno Dumont

=== 2020s ===
Year	English title	Original title	Director(s)
2020	Adolescents	Adolescentes	Sébastien Lifshitz
2021	Onoda: 10,000 Nights in the Jungle	Onoda, 10 000 nuits dans la jungle / ONODA 一万夜を越えて	Arthur Harari
2022	Pacifiction	Pacifiction – Tourment sur les îles	Albert Serra
2022	Saint Omer		Alice Diop
2023	The Animal Kingdom	Le Règne animal	Thomas Cailley
2024	Misericordia	Miséricorde	Alain Guiraudie
2025	The Little Sister	La Petite Dernière	Hafsia Herzi

== Louis Delluc Prize for Best First Film ==
=== 1990s ===
Year	English title	Original title	Director(s)
1999	Voyages		Emmanuel Finkiel

=== 2000s ===
Year	English title	Original title	Director(s)
2000	Human Resources	Ressources humaines	Laurent Cantet
2001	Toutes les nuits		Eugène Green
2002	Wesh wesh, qu'est-ce qui se passe?		Rabah Ameur-Zaïmeche
2003	It's Easier for a Camel...	Il est plus facile pour un chameau...	Valeria Bruni-Tedeschi
2004	When the Sea Rises	Quand la mer monte...	Yolande Moreau and Gilles Porte
2005	Cold Showers	Douches froides	Antony Cordier
2006	Premonition	Le Pressentiment	Jean-Pierre Darroussin
2007	Water Lilies	Naissance des pieuvres	Céline Sciamma
2007	All Is Forgiven	Tout est pardonné	Mia Hansen-Løve
2008	The Apprentice	L'Apprenti	Samuel Collardey
2009	Silent Voice	Qu'un seul tienne et les autres suivront	Léa Fehner

=== 2010s ===
Year	English title	Original title	Director(s)
2010	Dear Prudence	Belle Épine	Rebecca Zlotowski
2011	Donoma		Djinn Carrénard
2012	Louise Wimmer		Cyril Mennegun
2013	Vandal		Hélier Cisterne
2014	Love at First Fight	Les Combattants	Thomas Cailley
2015	The Great Game	Le Grand Jeu	Nicolas Pariser
2016	Still Life	Gorge cœur ventre	Maud Alpi
2017	Raw	Grave	Julia Ducournau
2018	Custody	Jusqu'à la garde	Xavier Legrand
2018	The Wild Boys	Les Garçons sauvages	Bertrand Mandico
2019	Burning Ghost	Vif-Argent	Stéphane Batut

=== 2020s ===
Year	English title	Original title	Director(s)
2020	Josep		Aurel
2021	Towards the Battle	Vers le bataille	Aurélien Vernhes-Lermusiaux
2022	Falcon Lake		Charlotte Le Bon
2023	The Rapture	Le Ravissement	Iris Kaltenbäck
2024	Ghost Trail	Les Fantômes	Jonathan Millet
2025	That Summer in Paris	Le rendez-vous de l'été	Valentine Cadic

== Jury ==
=== 1937 edition ===
- Maurice Bessy
- Pierre Bost
- Georges Charensol
- Nino Franck
- Marcel Idzkowski
- Roger Régent
