= Irina Muluile =

French actress (born 1989)

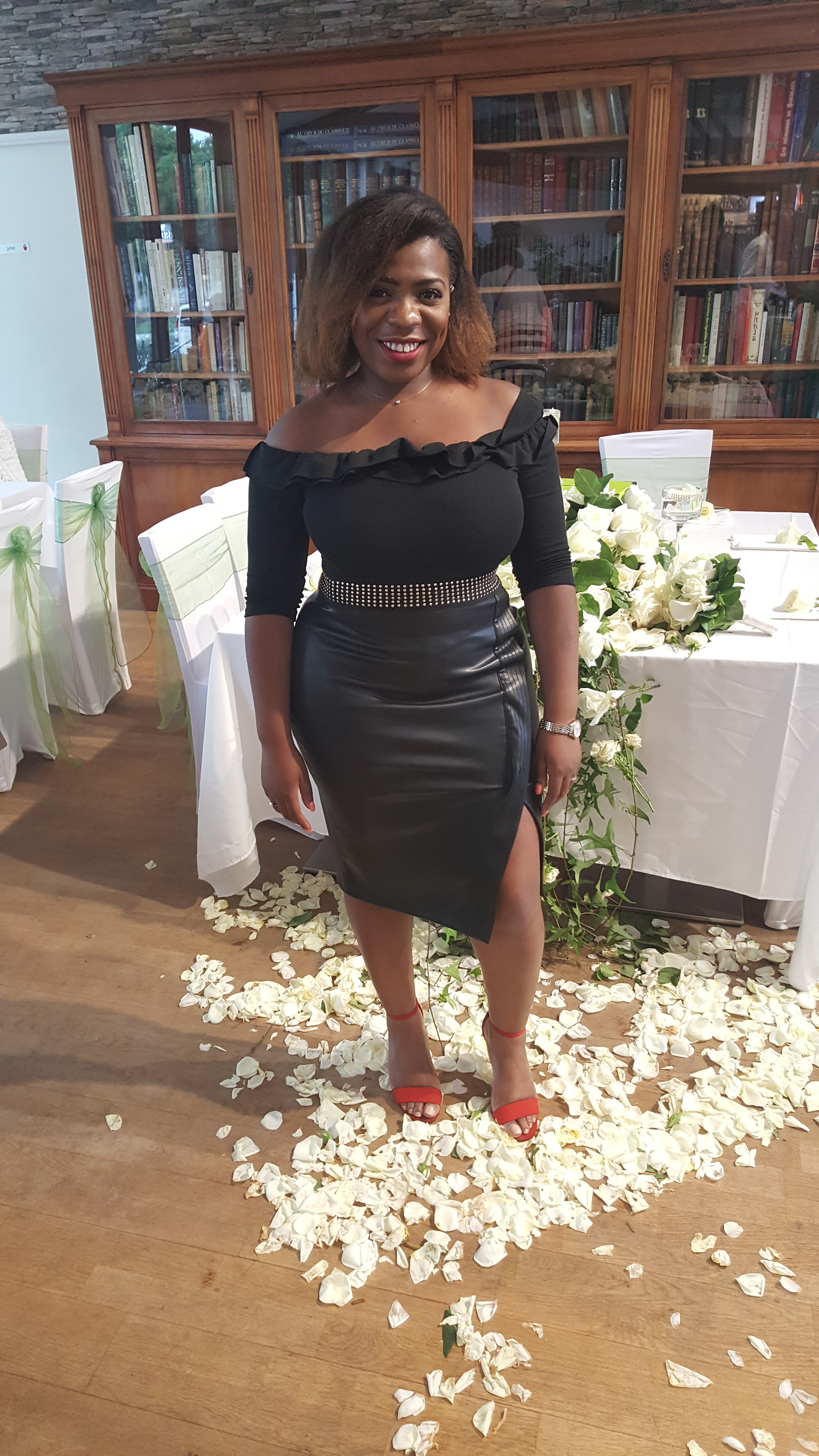
- Muluile in June 2014
- Born: 6 March 1989 (age 37); Kinshasa, Zaire
- Occupation: Actress
- Years active: 2006–present

Irina Muluile (born 6 March 1989) is a French actress. She has appeared in L'École pour tous, Camping 2, Heal the Living and, since 2015, in the French political thriller television series The Bureau as Daisy Bapes ("The Mule").

== Biography ==
Irina Muluile was born on 6 March 1989 in Kinshasa, Zaire.

She arrived in France with her parents at the age of 3 months and grew up in Villemomble. In 2000, she moved in Sevran in Seine-Saint-Denis. She practises Muay Thai, rugby, dancing and singing.
