= Gorge cœur ventre =

- Directed by: Maud Alpi
- Written by: Maud Alpi, Baptiste Boulba
- Produced by: Mathieu Bompoint
- Cinematography: Jonathan Ricquebourg
- Edited by: Laurence Larre
- Release date: 2016
- Running time: 82 mins
- Country: France
- Language: French

Still Life (French: Gorge cœur ventre) is a 2016 French drama film directed by Maud Alpi. It premiered at the Locarno Film Festival.

It received the Louis-Delluc Prize for Best First Film in 2016 and was also nominated for the Lumières Award for Best First Film.

== Plot ==
Thomas works in a slaughterhouse, guiding animals toward their deaths each night. His dog, Boston, stays by his side and sees everything with him. The film follows Thomas as he struggles with the harsh, frightening environment of his job and the fear he witnesses in the animals. Outside of work, he lives a rough life but still tries to find small moments of calm and kindness.

== Release ==
Gorge cœur ventre premiered in August 2016 at the Locarno Film Festival in the Cineasti del presente section. It was later released theatrically in France on 16 November 2016. The film also screened at various international festivals.
