= Land Legs =

- Directed by: Samuel Collardey
- Written by: Samuel Collardey; Catherine Paillé
- Produced by: Grégoire Debailly
- Starring: Dominique Leborne
- Cinematography: Samuel Collardey
- Edited by: Julien Lacheray
- Music by: Vincent Girault
- Release date: September 9, 2015 (Venice Film Festival)
- Language: French
- Box office: $330,000

Land Legs (French: Tempête) is a 2015 French drama film written and directed by Samuel Collardey. It was screened at the 72nd Venice International Film Festival, where Dominique Leborne was awarded best actor in the Horizons section.

== Cast ==
- Dominique Leborne as Dom
- Mailys Leborne as Mailys
- Matteo Leborne as Matteo
- Chantal Leborne as Dom's Mother
- Vincent Bessonnet as Vincent
- Patrick d'Assumçao as The Shipowner
- Marc Brunet as The Banker
