= Bahman Motamedian =

Iranian filmmaker, photographer and writer

- بهمن معتمدیان
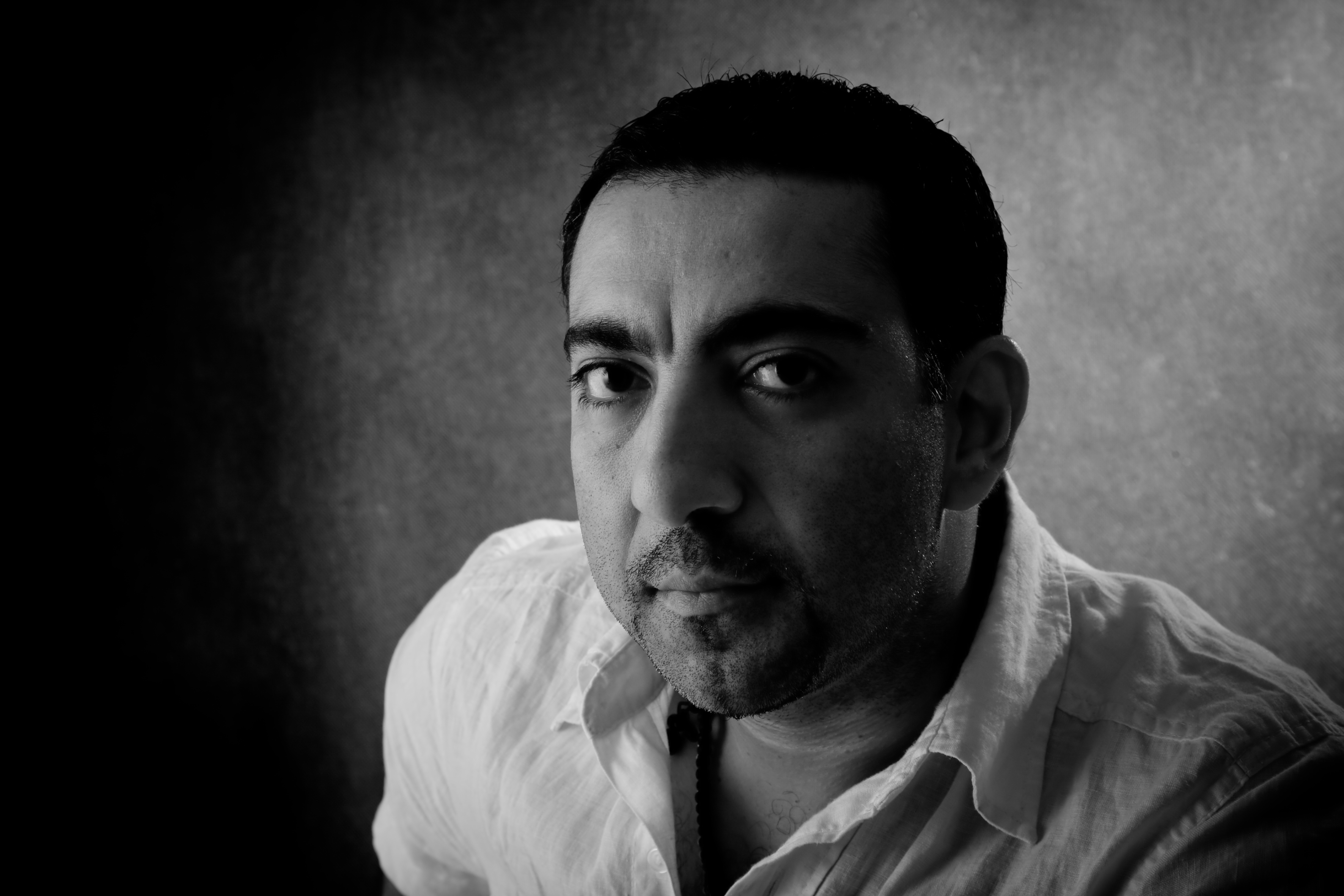
- Born: July 2 Tehran, Iran
- Occupations: Filmmaker, screenwriter, photographer
- Years active: 1998–present
- Website: www.bahmanmotamedian.com

Bahman Motamedian (Persian: بهمن معتمدیان; born 2 July) is an Iranian filmmaker, photographer, writer and script writer. He was born in Tehran, Iran. Motamedian belongs to the so-called "new wave" of Iranian cinema. Bahman Motamedian is also has been involved in over twenty works, including shorts film, documentaries film, video art and theater.
Motamedian made his first feature film, titled "Khastegi" ("Sex My Life" aka "Tedium") in 2008. "Khastegi" (Sex My Life) was shown in the official selection of 65th Venice International Film Festival as the "surprise film" in 2008.

== Filmography ==
Film	Date	Type
Khastegi (Sex My Life)	2008	Feature Film
A Song for the Dying	2006	Documentary
Music and Forgetting	2006	Documentary
Aquarium	2001	short film

== Screen Writing ==
Film	Year	Type
Khastegi (Sex My Life)	2008	Feature Film
A Song for the Dying	2006	Documentary
Music and Forgetting	2006	Documentary
Left Handed	2006	Feature Film
Aquarium	2001	Short Film

== Screen Writing for Television Series ==
- Char Khooneh [Title in Persian: Chahar Khoone] (2007–2008)
- Barareh Nights [Title in Persian: Shabhaye Barareh] (2005)
- The Dots (TV series) [Title in Persian: Noghtechin] (2005)
- Do Not Enter [Title in Persian: Vorod Mamno, Mamno] (2004)
- Under the City's Skin (TV series) [Title in Persian: Zire Asemane Shahr] (2003)
- Without Description [Title in Persian: Bedone Sharh] (2002)
- Empyrean Police [Title in Persian: Polise Asemani] (2001)
- Number 14 [Title in Persian: Pelake 14] (2000)
- Magic Light [Title in Persian: Cheraghe Jadou] (2000)
- Eternal Train [Title in Persian: Ghatare Abadi] (2000)

== Awards and nominations ==
- Awards the first prize (24th Torino GBLT Film Festival 23–3 April 2009 / Torino, Italy)
- Special citation (Best producer) (Asia Pacific Festival of 1st Films/ 4–10 December 2008/ Singapore)
- Brian Prize (65th Venice International Film Festival / 27 August to 6 September 2008)
- Queer Lion Award (65th Venice International Film Festival / 27 August to 6 September 2008)
- The Best Experimental Film /Aquarium /(Festival of Nations / 13–19 June 2003/Ebensee, Austria)
- Silver Bear /Aquarium /(Festival of Nations / 13–19 June 2003/Ebensee, Austria)

== "Aquarium" has been screened at ==
- Sonar International Short Film Festival (April 2006 /Florence – Italy)
- 3rd International Festival Signes de Nuit (25–30 April 2005 /Paris)
- Rencontres International Paris/Berlin (18–28 February 2003/Paris)
- Festival of Nations (13–19 June 2003 /Ebensee, Austria)
- Rencontres International Paris/Berlin (10–22 November 2003/berlin)
- Victoria Independent Film & Video Festival (1-10 February 2002/Canada)
- 25th Open Air Film Fest WEITERSTAD (16–20 August 2001/Germany)
- 2nd IndieKINO International film festival (July 2001/Seoul, Korea)
- Ajijic International film festival (7–11 November 2001/Mexico)
- Kansas City film festival (7–14 April/U.S.A)

== "Khastegi" (Sex My Life) has been screened at ==
- 24th BFI London Lesbian & Gay Film Festival (BFI) ( 17–31 March 2010/ London, England)
- Cinema Digital Seoul Film Festival (CinDi) ( 19–25 August 2009 / Seoul, South Korea)
- Chelsea Art Museum (15 July – 19 August 2009 / New York City)
- 19th Toronto LGBT Film Festival (14–24 May 2009 / Toronto, Ontario, Canada)
- 24th Torino GBLT Film Festival (23–3 April 2009 / Torino, Italy)
- Prague international Film Festival (FEBIOFEST) (26 March-3 April 2009 / Prague, Czech Republic)
- International Contemporary Film Festival (FICCO) (17 Feb – 1 Mar 2009 / Mexico, Mexico City)
- Asia Pacific Festival of 1st Films (4–10 December 2008 / Singapore)
- Festival of 3 Continents, Nantes (22 November – 2 December 2008 / Nantes, French)
- Sao Paulo Film Festival (17–30 October 2008 / São Paulo, Brazil)
- Venice Film Festival (27 August – 6 September 2008 / Venice, Italy)

== Play Directing/ Stage Directing ==
- Eugène Ionesco's play The Bald Soprano (2013) /Tehran
- Eugène Ionesco's play Jack, or the Submission (1997) /Tehran
- Eugène Ionesco's play Maid to Marry (1997) /Tehran
- Eugène Ionesco's play The Bald Soprano (1997) /Tehran
- Eugène Ionesco's play The Bald Soprano (1995) /Tehran

== Published Stories ==
- The Big Overcoat (2010) /Short Story Collection
- The Sound of Train Whistling (1999) /Short Story

== Solo Exhibition ==
- Niyavaran Cafe Art Gallery /Photography /2007 /Tehran

== Group Exhibition ==
- Youth Cinéma Institute /Photography /1991 /Tehran

== Educational-backgrounds ==
- Tehran Azad University /Master of Play Directing /1996-1997 /Tehran
- Tehran Azad University /Bachelor of Industrial Engineering /1995 /Tehran
- Studying Theatre for two years and joining to /1994 /Tehran
- Experimental Theater Institute
- Art University /Film Directing Major /1992-1994 /Tehran
- Studying Photography at Youth Cinema Institute /1990 /Tehran
- and working as a Professional Photographer
- High School Diploma /1989 /Tehran

== See also ==
- Intellectual movements in Iran
- Iranian New Wave (cinema)
- Cinema of Iran
- Humanitarianism
