= Catriona MacInnes =

Scottish filmmaker

Catriona MacInnes is a Scottish film-maker. A graduate of MFA (Advanced Film Practice), Screen Academy Scotland, her graduation film ("I'm In Away From Here") was nominated for the Golden Lion Award in Corto Cortissimo at the 65th Venice International Film Festival in 2008. Since then it has won a "Golden Opportunity Award" at Nashville Film Festival and Special Mention for Performance at Arcipelago Film Festival as well as appearing at many other festivals and being nominated in the fiction category of the BAFTA Scotland New Talent Awards during 2009.

In 2011 her second short A Cuillin Rising (developed and commissioned by Digicult and funded by Creative Scotland and the UK Film Council) premiered at the BFI London Film festival, and was later nominated for British Council Best New Short at London Short Film Festival. It as also screened at many other festivals including Glasgow, Nashville and Seattle.

Catriona began developing a planned feature film Gift From God in 2012 through a Playwright's Studio Scotland residency. Her mentor on the residency was Molly Stensgaard.
