= Donoma =

- Film poster
- Directed by: Djinn Carrénard
- Written by: Djinn Carrénard
- Release date: May 13, 2010 (CIFF)
- Running time: 133 minutes
- Country: France
- Language: French

Donoma is a 2010 French drama film written and directed by Djinn Carrénard. Carrénard was awarded the 2010 Prix Louis-Delluc for first film.

== Cast ==
- Emilia Derou-Bernal as Amalia
- Vincente Perez as Dacio
- Salomé Blechmans as Salma
