= The Visitor (2008 film) =

- Film poster
- Directed by: Jukka-Pekka Valkeapää
- Written by: Jan Forsström, Jukka-Pekka Valkeapää
- Starring: Vitali Bobrov, Emilia Ikäheimo, Pavel Liška
- Cinematography: Tuomo Hutri
- Edited by: Mervi Junkkonen
- Release date: 31 August 2008 (Venice)
- Running time: 105 minutes
- Country: Finland
- Language: Finnish

The Visitor (Finnish: Muukalainen) is a 2008 drama film directed by Finnish director Jukka-Pekka Valkeapää. It is a joint production of Finland, Estonia, Germany, and the UK.

== Plot ==
A mute boy lives in a remote farm with his mother, while his father, a violent person, is in prison. A stranger arrives at the farm and, reluctantly, he is given hospitality. The film brings the viewer close to the winter landscapes of the Finnish countryside through the eyes of the boy.

== Cast ==
- Vitali Bobrov, as the mute boy
- Emilia Ikäheimo, as his mother
- Jorma Tommila, as his father
- Pavel Liška, a stranger

== Production ==
The Visitor was co-written by Jan Forsström and Jukka-Pekka Valkeapää, and directed by Valkeapää.

Cinematography was by Tuomo Hutri.

It is a joint production of Finland, Estonia, Germany, and the UK.

== Release ==
On 28 August 2008, The Visitor premiered at the Venice Days section of the 65th Venice International Film Festival.

== Accolades ==
The film won the Dragon Award and the Nordic Vision Award at the 2009 Göteborg Film Festival.

In 2010, it won two Jussi Awards, one for Best Cinematography and one for Best Editing, and was nominated for four more.
