= The Apprentice (2008 film) =

- Directed by: Samuel Collardey
- Screenplay by: Samuel Collardey; Catherine Paillé
- Produced by: Grégoire Debailly
- Starring: Paul Barbier
- Cinematography: Samuel Collardey
- Edited by: Julien Lacheray
- Music by: Vincent Girault
- Release date: 2008
- Country: France
- Language: French

The Apprentice (French: L'apprenti) is a 2008 French docudrama film written and directed by Samuel Collardey, in his feature directorial debut. It premiered at the 65th Venice International Film Festival, in the Venice International Film Critics' Week sidebar, in which it won the Award for Best Film. It also won the Louis Delluc Prize for Best First Film.

== Cast ==
- Paul Barbier as Paul
- Mathieu Bulle as Mathieu
- Jeannine Barbier as Paul's girlfriend
- Pascal Bulle as Mathieu's father
- Martine Maire as Mathieu's mother
