= Khastegi =

- Directed by: Bahman Motamedian
- Written by: Bahman Motamedian
- Produced by: Bahman Motamedian; Esmaeil Mirzaei Ghomi
- Cinematography: Homayoon Paivar
- Edited by: Bahman Motamedian; Behzad Mosleh
- Music by: Iman Vaziri
- Distributed by: Celluloid Dreams
- Release date: 2008
- Running time: 76 minutes
- Country: Iran
- Language: Persian

Khastegi (Persian: خستگی; also known as Tedium and Sex My Life) is a 2008 Persian independent film written and directed by Bahman Motamedian and produced in Iran. It was shown at the 65th Venice International Film Festival in 2008.

== Plot ==
Khastegi tells the story of seven Iranian transsexuals living in Tehran.

== Screenings ==
- 24th BFI London Lesbian and Gay Film Festival (BFI) (March 17–31, 2010/ London, England)
- Cinema Digital Seoul Film Festival (CinDi) (August 19–25, 2009 / Seoul, South Korea)
- Chelsea Art Museum (July 15- August 19, 2009 / New York, USA)
- 19th Toronto LGBT Film Festival (May 14–24, 2009 / Toronto, Ontario, Canada)
- 24th Torino GBLT Film Festival (23–3 April 2009 / Torino, Italy)
- Prague international Film Festival (Febiofest) (26 March-3 April 2009 / Prague, Czech Republic)
- Mexico City International Contemporary Film Festival (FICCO) (17 Feb. - 1 Mar. 2009 / Mexico, Mexico City)
- Asia Pacific Festival of 1st Films (4–10 December 2008 / Singapore)
- Three Continents Festival, Nantes (22 November - 2 December 2008 / Nantes, French)
- Sao Paulo Film Festival (17–30 October 2008 / São Paulo, Brazil)
- Venice Film Festival (August 27- September 6, 2008 / Venice, Italy)

== Awards and nominations ==
- Awards the first prize (24th Torino GBLT Film Festival 23–3 April 2009 / Torino, Italy)
- Special citation (Best producer) (Asia Pacific Festival of 1st Films/ 4–10 December 2008/ Singapore)
- Brian Award (65th Venice International Film Festival / August 27 to September 6, 2008)
- Queer Lion Award (65th Venice International Film Festival / August 27 to September 6, 2008)
