= Éric Rochant =

French film director and screenwriter (born 1961)

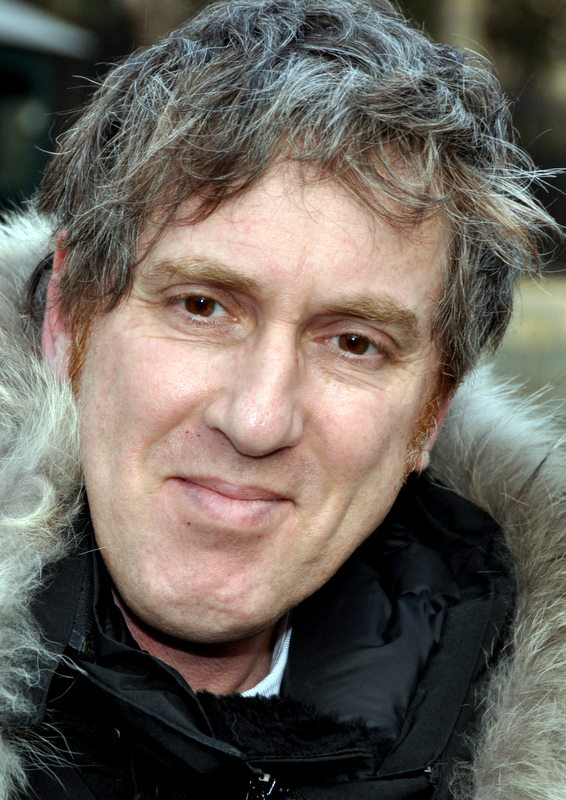
- Rochant in 2013
- Born: 24 February 1961 (age 65); Paris, France
- Occupations: Film director, screenwriter, producer
- Years active: 1984–present

Éric Rochant (born 24 February 1961) is a French film director and screenwriter. He is an alumnus of the Institut des hautes études cinématographiques (IDHEC), from the generation of Arnaud Desplechin and Noémie Lvovsky. Rochant is of Jewish background.

== Filmography ==
Year	Title	Role	Notes
1984	Comme les doigts de la main	Director & writer	Short
1985	French Lovers	Director & writer	Short; Clermont-Ferrand International Short Film Festival - Filmodie Award
1987	Présence féminine	Director & writer	Short; César Award for Best Short Film; Tampere International Short Film Festival - Diploma of Merit - International Competition
1989	Love Without Pity	Director & writer	César Award for Best First Feature Film; Louis Delluc Prize; Venice Film Festival - Critics Week - FIPRESCI Prize; Venice Film Festival - Kodak-Cinecritica Award; Nominated - César Award for Best Film; Nominated - César Award for Best Original Screenplay or Adaptation; Nominated - European Film Award for European Discovery of the Year
1991	Aux yeux du monde	Director & writer	
1994	The Patriots	Director & writer	Nominated - Cannes Film Festival - Palme d'Or
1996	Anna Oz	Director & writer	Nominated - Mar del Plata International Film Festival - Best Film - International Competition
1997	Vive la république	Director & writer	
2000	Total western	Director & writer	
2001	Traders	Director & writer	Documentary
2006	L'école pour tous	Director & writer	
2008–10	Mafiosa	Director & writer	TV series (16 episodes); Nominated - Globes de Cristal Award for Best Television Film or Television Series
2013	Möbius	Director & writer	
2015–2020	The Bureau	Director, writer & Producer	TV series (50 episodes); ACS Award for Best Writing (2017); Nominated - ACS Award for Best Director (2016); Nominated - ACS Award for Best Writing (2016); Nominated - ACS Award for Best Director (2019); Nominated - ACS Award for Best Writing (2019)
