= Giovanni Corvaja =

Italian jewellery artist

Giovanni Corvaja (born 30 September 1971) is an Italian jewellery artist known for fine wire work.

== Early life ==
Born in 1971 in Padua, Italy, Giovanni Corvaja began work as a metalsmith at the age of 13 at Pietro Selvatico High School of Art in Padua under the tuition of Francesco Pavan and Paolo Maurizio. In 1988 was awarded the Diploma di Maestro d’Arte, and in 1990 – the Maturità d’Arte Applicata.

In 1990, he joined the Royal College of Art in London to continue his studies in the field of art jewellery. After graduation from the Royal College with the Degree of Master of Arts in 1992, he returned to Padua where he pursued his artistic career in goldsmithing.

== Career ==
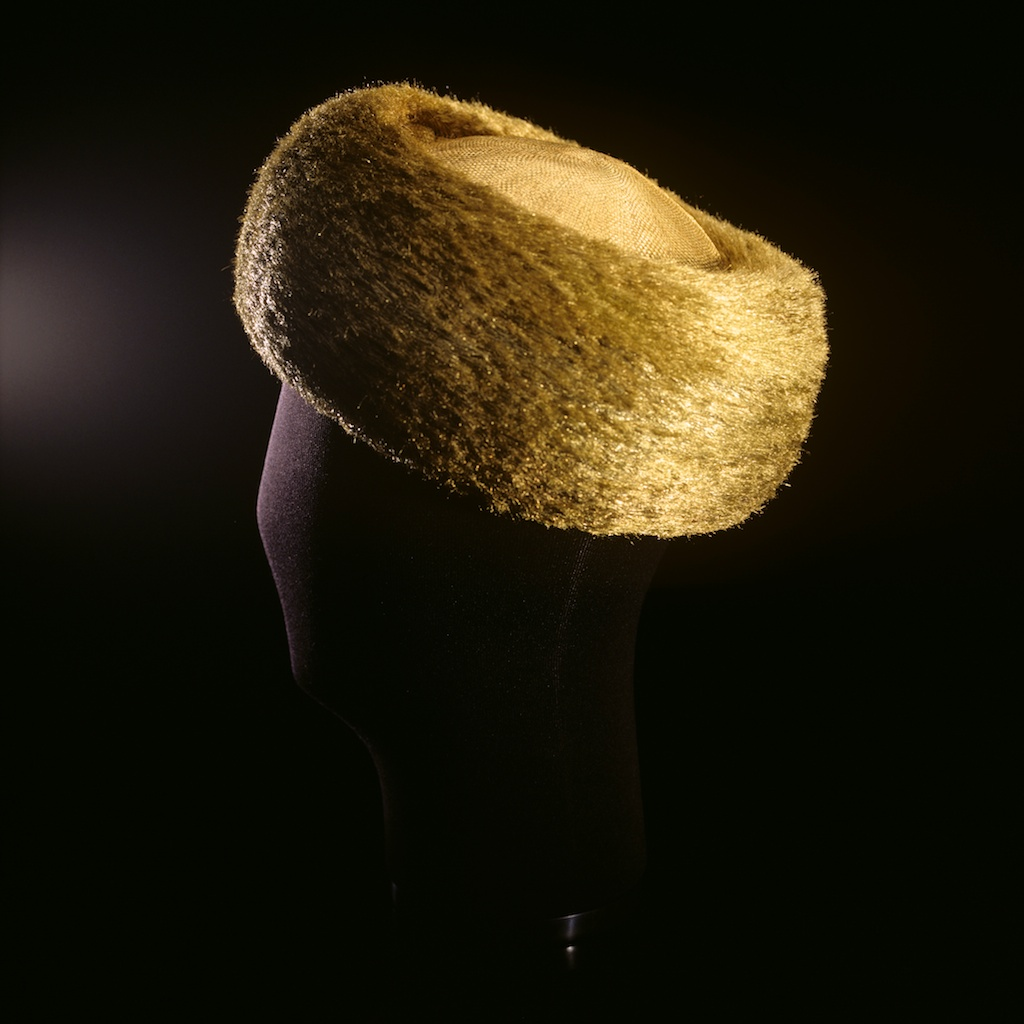
The Headpiece from The Golden Fleece Collection, exhibited in the 'What is Luxury' exhibition at the Victoria and Albert Museum, London.

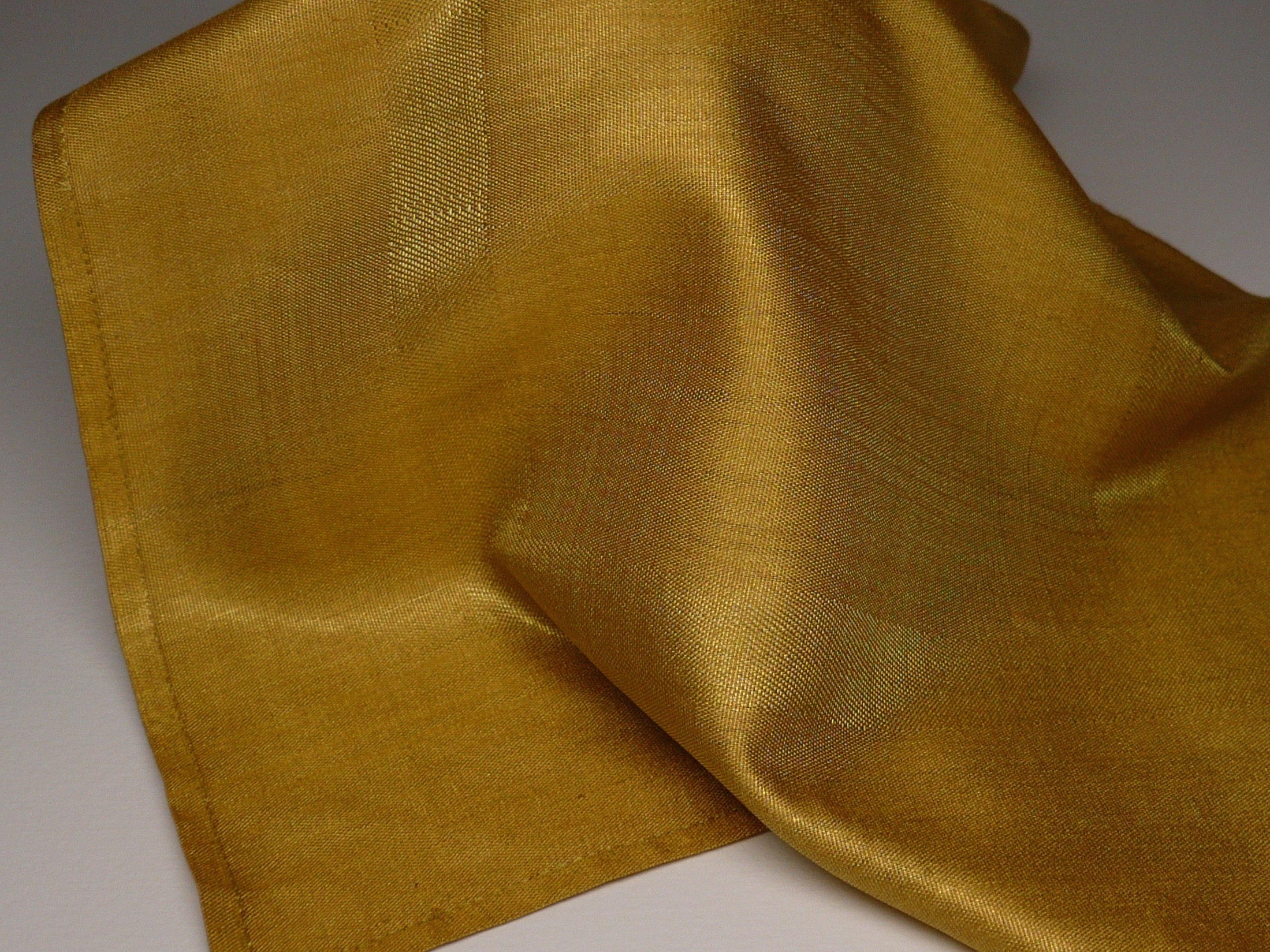
The Golden Handkerchief (hand-woven golden fabric)

Giovanni Corvaja has been exhibiting his work internationally since 1989, and has presented his pieces in more than 150 solo and group exhibitions worldwide. Some of his annual exhibitions are in major art fairs such as The European Fine Art Fair, Pavilion of Art and Design, London, Masterpiece, London and COLLECT since 2008.

=== The Golden Fleece Collection and The Golden Cloth ===
Giovanni Corvaja is renowned as the creator of the mythical Golden Fleece Collection, a series of five unique pieces made from hand-spun golden fur. The first public presentation of the collection took place in spring 2009 in Munich, Germany, at the International Trade Fair, in the fame of a special exhibition, Modern Masters. The epical collection has been followed by the Golden Handkerchief, a piece made from hand-woven golden fabric.

=== Work in public collections ===
Corvaja’s pieces are in numerous collections of major museums worldwide, such as:

- Nottingham Castle Museum and Art Gallery, Nottingham, UK (2011)
- The Alice and Louis Koch Collection of Rings, Switzerland (2010)
- Dallas Museum of Art, Dallas, USA (2010)
- mima Middlesbrough Institute of Modern Art, Middelsbrough, UK (2009)
- The National Gallery of Australia, Canberra, Australia (2008)
- Museum of Arts and Design, New York, USA (2008)
- Museo degli Argenti e delle Porcellane, Palazzo Pitti, Florence, Italy (2007)
- Schmuckmuseum Pforzheim, Germany (2006)
- Museum für Kunst und Gewerbe, Hamburg, Germany (1999, 2005)
- Victoria and Albert Museum, London, England
- Newark Museum of Arts, Newark, New Jersey, USA (2004)
- Toledo Museum of Art, Toledo, Ohio, USA (2003)
- National Museum of Scotland, Edinburgh, Scotland
- Kunstgewerbemuseum, Berlin, Germany (1999)
- Landesmuseum Joanneum, Graz, Austria (1998)
- Musée des Arts Décoratifs, Montreal, Canada (1996)
- Musée des Arts Décoratifs, Paris, France (1996)
- Die Neue Sammlung, Staatliches Museum Für Angewandte Kunst, Munich, Germany (1992)
- Royal College of Art Public Collection, London, England (1992)
- Ayrton Metals Platinum Collection, London, England (1992)

== Awards and recognition ==
Corvaja has been awarded many international prizes and recognitions, such as:

- Contemporary Art and design - 21st Century, Masterpiece, London, UK (2016)
- Art Fund COLLECT (2011)
- Prize of the Unione Regionale delle Camere di Commercio dell’Umbria, Terni, Italy (1998)
- Prize for Highly Commended Work, International Jewellery Competition ‘97, Tokyo, Japan (1998)
- Bayerischer Staatspreis, Munich, Germany (1997)
- 2nd Prize, Granulation ‘96, Pforzheim, Germany (1996)
- Herbert Hofmann Prize, Munich, Germany (1992)
- 2nd Prize, Worshipful Company of Gold and Silver Wyre Drawers Competition, London, England (1991)
- 3rd Prize, Signaturen, Schwäbisch Gmünd, Germany (1990)

== Bibliography ==
- MEDUSA Jewellery & Taboos, Musée d’Art Moderne de la Ville de Paris, Anne Dressen, Michèle Heuzé, Benjamin Lignel, Paris Musées, 2017, pp. 64–65: ISBN 978-2-7596-0374-9
- Rings around the World, Beatriz Chadour and Sandra Hindman, Les Enluminures, 2016, pp. 260–264: ISBN 978-0-9971842-1-1
- Scotland to the World. Treasures from the National Museum of Scotland, National Museum of Scotland, 2016, pp. 100–101: ISBN 978-1-910682-05-0
- Showcase 500 Rings: new directions in art jewelry, Marthe Le Van, Lark Crafts, 2012, pp. 189, 283: ISBN 978-1-4547-0288-7
- 21st Century Jewelry: The best of 500 Series, Marthe Le Van, Lark Crafts, 2011, pp. 7, 157, 234, 345, 395, 403: ISBN 978-1-60059-521-9
- Masters Gold: major works by leading artists, Marthe Le Van, Lark Books, 2009, pp. 120–127: ISBN 978-1-60059-040-5
- Gioiello Italiano Contemporaneo. Tecniche e materiali tra arte e design, Alba Cappellieri, SKIRA, 2008, P. 61
- 500 Earrings: new directions in contemporary jewelry, Marthe Le Van, Lark Books, 2007, pp. 13, 155, 261, 263: ISBN 978-1-57990-823-2
- 500 Bracelets: an inspiring collection of extraordinary designs, Marthe Le Van, Lark Books, 2005, pp. 112, 352: ISBN 1-57990-480-7
- 500 Brooches: inspiring adornments for the body, Marthe Le Van, Lark Books, 2005, pp. 6, 34, 150: ISBN 1-57990-612-5
- Contemporary Jewellery. The Padua School, Graziella Filching Grassetto, Arnoldsche, 2005, pp. 94–101: ISBN 3-89790-202-8
- Dizionario del Gioiello Italiano del XIX e XX Secolo, Lia Lenti e Maria Christina Bergesio, Umberto Allemandi & C., 2005, pp. 82–83
- 1000 Rings: inspiring adornments for the hand, Marthe Le Van, Lark Books, 2004, pp. 339, 411: ISBN 1-57990-508-0
- Design Sourcebook. Jewellery, David Watkins, New Holland, 1999, pp. 1, 14-15: ISBN 1-85974-078-2
- III eme Triennale du Bijou, Musée des Arts Décoratifs, Editions Du May, 1992, P. 108: ISBN 2-906450-86-3
