= Samuel Collardey =

French cinematographer, film director and screenwriter

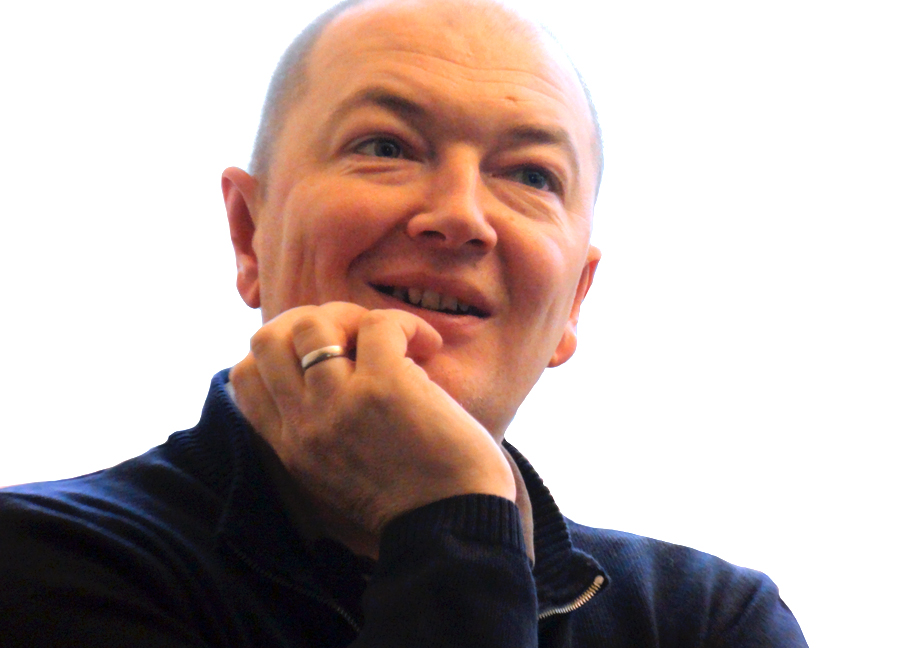
- Born: July 29, 1975; Besançon
- Occupations: French Director, Cinematographer
- Years active: 2004–present

Samuel Collardey is a French film and television director and cinematographer noted for his work in the Docufiction genre.

== Biography ==
Born July 29, 1975, in the eastern French city of Besançon, Collardey spent four years working for French television before being accepted to France's prestigious national film school, La Fémis. His thesis film, Du soleil en hiver, garnered numerous accolades including the SACD prize at the Director's Fortnight sidebar of the Cannes Film Festival, and the special jury prize at the Clermont-Ferrand International Short Film Festival.

In 2008, he released his first feature-length docufiction film entitled The Apprentice. It tells the story of a young farmhand learning his trade at a dairy near the Swiss border. The film received the Critic's Fortnight prize at the Venice Film Festival and the Louis-Delluc Prize for best first feature.

In 2013, he directed his second feature Little Lion about a young Senegalese soccer player who has to fend for himself in France after being abandoned there by a crooked talent scout. The film was coproduced by Arte France.

In his third feature, Land Legs, Collardey returned to a more documentary approach, adapting his script, co-written with Catherine Paillé, from the real-life story of Dom, a commercial fisherman forced to choose between a life at sea and the custody of his two children. The film was selected at the Venice International Film Festival, where Dominique Leborne was awarded the Best Actor Prize in the Horizons section.

In addition to his work for the big screen, in 2015 Collardey directed two episodes of the critically acclaimed political thriller The Bureau (TV series), available in the US and UK via iTunes and Amazon Prime.

He is currently at work on his fourth feature, which takes place in Greenland.

== Filmography ==
=== As Director of Photography ===
Short Films

- 2004 : Tempête by Nikolay Khomeriki
- 2005 : Naissance de l'orgueil by Antonio Hébrard
- 2005 : À deux (Vdvoyom) by Nikolay Khomeriki
- 2005 : Du soleil en hiver by Samuel Collardey
- 2005 : Contre Temps by Armel Hostiou

Feature Films

- 2009 : Adieu Gary by Nassim Amaouche
- 2011 : J'aime regarder les filles by Frédéric Louf

=== As a director ===
Short Films

- 2004 : René et Yvonne
- 2005 : Du soleil en hiver

Feature Films

- 2008 : The Apprentice
- 2013 : Little Lion
- 2015 : Land Legs

== Prizes ==
- 2005: SACD Prize at the Director's Fortnight, Cannes
- 2005: Bayard d'or for best short film at the Festival international du film francophone de Namur
- 2006: Laureat of the Fondation Gan pour le cinéma for L'Apprenti.
- 2006: Special Jury Prize at the Clermont-Ferrand International Short Film Festival
- 2008: Prix Louis-Delluc du premier film pour The Apprentice
- 2008: International Critic's Week Prize 65e Mostra de Venise
