= Hélier Cisterne =

French director and screenwriter

Hélier Cisterne is a French director and screenwriter.

== Background ==
Hélier Cisterne is originally from the Lot region. After earning a literature baccalaureate with a cinema option at the Lycée d'Arsonval in Brive-la-Gaillarde, he went on to study philosophy at the University of Paris VIII, where he made his first short film at the age of 22.

He is a member of the Collectif 50/50, an organization dedicated to promoting gender equality and diversity within the film and audiovisual industries.

In 2008, Cisterne won the Prix Jean Vigo award for his short film Les Paradis perdus. He was also nominated for a César Award in 2009 in the Best Short Film category for Les Paradis perdus (Lost Paradises).

== Filmography ==
- 2003: Dehors
- 2006: Les Deux Vies du serpent
- 2008: Les Paradis perdus
- 2011: Sous la lame de l'épée
- 2013: Vandal
- 2020: De nos frères blessés
