= 35th César Awards =

2010 French film awards ceremony

- Date: 27 February 2010
- Site: Théâtre du Châtelet, Paris, France
- Hosted by: Valérie Lemercier and Gad Elmaleh

Highlights
- Best Picture: A Prophet
- Best Director: Jacques Audiard
- Best Actor: Tahar Rahim; A Prophet
- Best Actress: Isabelle Adjani; La Journée de la jupe
- Most awards: A Prophet (9)
- Most nominations: A Prophet (13)

Television coverage
- Network: Canal Plus

The 35th César Awards ceremony was presented by the Académie des Arts et Techniques du Cinéma in Paris to honour its selection of the best films of 2009 on 27 February 2010. The ceremony was chaired by Marion Cotillard, with Valérie Lemercier and Gad Elmaleh acting as the host. Harrison Ford was presented with an Honorary César by Sigourney Weaver.

== Winners and nominees ==
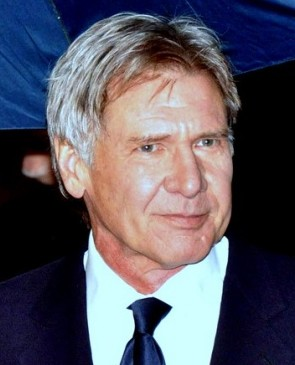
Harrison Ford, Honorary César recipient

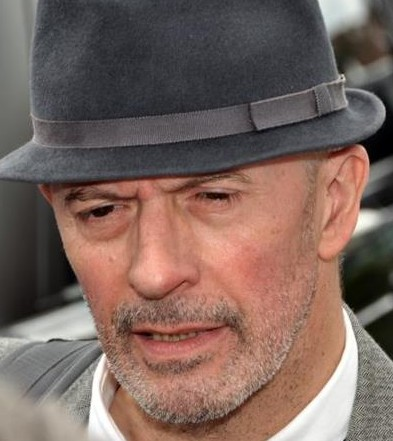
Jacques Audiard, Best Director winner

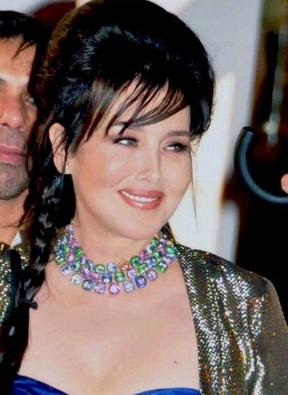
Isabelle Adjani, Best Actress winner

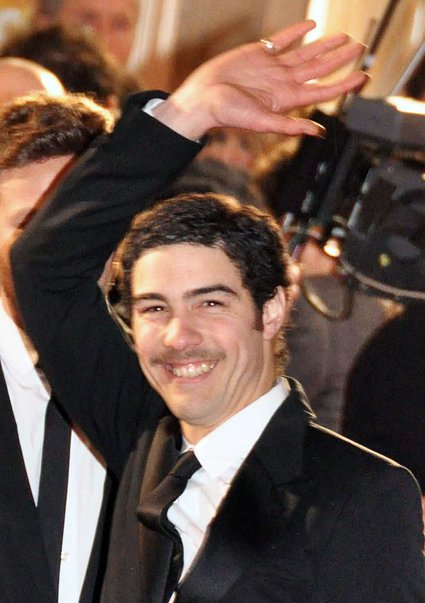
Tahar Rahim, Best Actor and Most Promising Actor winner

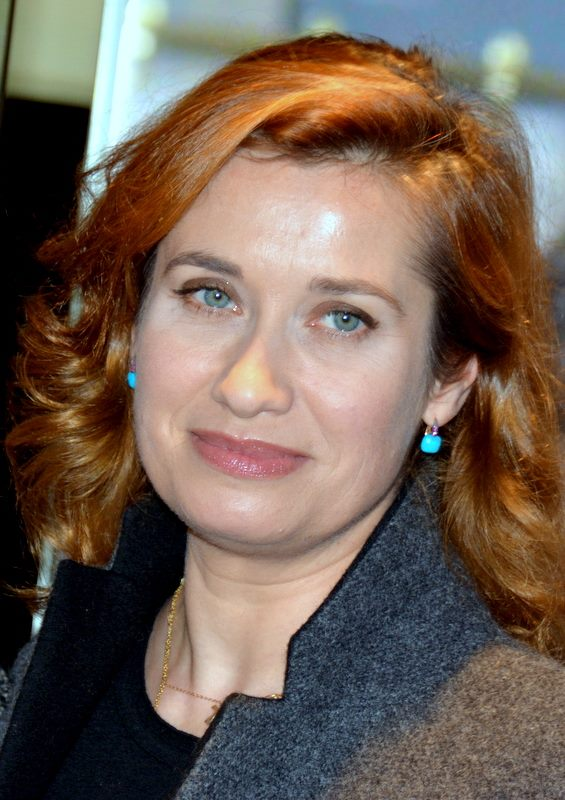
Emmanuelle Devos, Best Supporting Actress winner

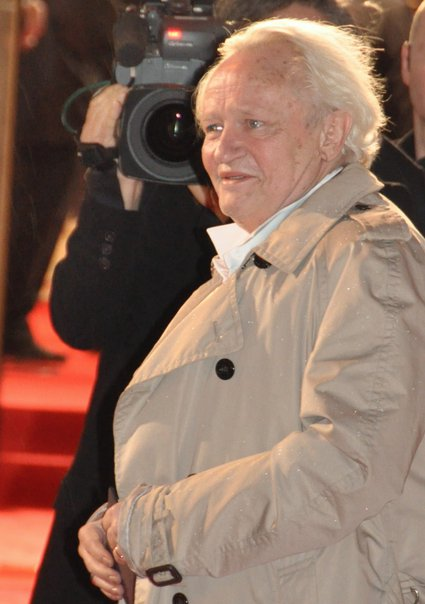
Niels Arestrup, Best Supporting Actor winner

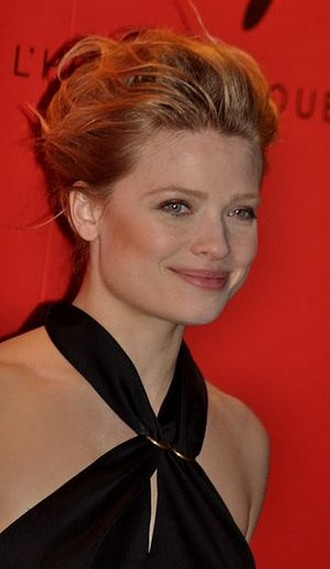
Mélanie Thierry, Most Promising Actress winner

Best Film (presented by Marion Cotillard) A Prophet: In the Beginning; Le Concert; Wild Grass; La Journée de la jupe; Rapt; Welcome	Best Director (presented by Vanessa Paradis) Jacques Audiard – A Prophet: Xavier Giannoli – In the Beginning; Radu Mihăileanu – Le Concert; Lucas Belvaux – Rapt; Philippe Lioret – Welcome
Best Actor (presented by Mélanie Laurent) Tahar Rahim – A Prophet: Yvan Attal – Rapt; François Cluzet – In the Beginning; François Cluzet – One for the Road; Vincent Lindon – Welcome	Best Actress (presented by Gérard Depardieu) Isabelle Adjani – La Journée de la jupe: Dominique Blanc – The Other One; Sandrine Kiberlain – Mademoiselle Chambon; Kristin Scott Thomas – Leaving; Audrey Tautou – Coco Before Chanel
Best Supporting Actor (presented by Laetitia Casta) Niels Arestrup – A Prophet: Jean-Hugues Anglade – Persécution; Joeystarr – All About Actresses; Benoît Poelvoorde – Coco Before Chanel; Michel Vuillermoz – One for the Road	Best Supporting Actress (presented by André Dussollier) Emmanuelle Devos – In the Beginning: Aure Atika – Mademoiselle Chambon; Anne Consigny – Rapt; Audrey Dana – Welcome; Noémie Lvovsky – The French Kissers
Most Promising Actor (presented by Laura Smet) Tahar Rahim – A Prophet: Firat Ayverdi – Welcome; Adel Bencherif – A Prophet; Vincent Lacoste – The French Kissers; Vincent Rottiers – I'm Glad My Mother Is Alive	Most Promising Actress (presented by Richard Berry) Mélanie Thierry – One for the Road: Pauline Étienne – Silent Voice; Florence Loiret-Caille – Je l'aimais; Soko – In the Beginning; Christa Théret – LOL (Laughing Out Loud)
Best Original Screenplay (presented by Marina Foïs) A Prophet – Jacques Audiard, Thomas Bidegain, Abdel Raouf Dafri and Nicolas Peufaillit: In the Beginning – Xavier Giannoli; Le Concert – Radu Mihăileanu, Alain-Michel Blanc, Matthew Robbins, Hector Cabello-Reyes and Thierry Degrandi; La Journée de la jupe – Jean-Paul Lilienfeld; Welcome – Philippe Lioret, Emmanuel Courcol and Oliver Adam	Best Adaptation (presented by Sandrine Kiberlain) Mademoiselle Chambon – Stéphane Brizé and Florence Vignon: Coco Before Chanel – Anne Fontaine and Camille Fontaine; One for the Road – Philippe Godeau and Agnès de Sacy; Wild Grass – Alex Réval and Laurent Herbiet; Little Nicholas – Laurent Tirard and Grégoire Vigneron
Best First Feature Film (presented by Mélanie Doutey and Pascal Elbé) The French Kissers: One for the Road; Spy(ies); La Première Étoile; Silent Voice	Best Cinematography (presented by Firmine Richard and Vincent Elbaz) Stéphane Fontaine – A Prophet: Glynn Speeckaert – In the Beginning; Christophe Beaucarne – Coco Before Chanel; Eric Gautier – Wild Grass; Laurent Dailland – Welcome
Best Editing (presented by Virginie Efira and François-Xavier Demaison) Juliette Welfling – A Prophet: Célia Lafitedupont – In the Beginning; Ludo Troch – Le Concert; Hervé de Luze – Wild Grass; Andréa Sedlackova – Welcome	Best Sound (presented by Firmine Richard and Vincent Elbaz) Pierre Excoffier, Bruno Tarrière and Sélim Azzazi – Le Concert: François Musy and Gabriel Hafner – In the Beginning; Jean Umansky, Gérard Hardy and Vincent Arnardi – Micmacs; Brigitte Taillandier, Francis Wargnier and Jean-Paul Hurier – A Prophet; Pierre Mertens, Laurent Quaglio and Eric Tisserand – Welcome
Best Original Music (presented by Jeanne Balibar) Armand Amar – Le Concert: Cliff Martinez – In the Beginning; Alex Beaupain – Making Plans for Lena; Alexandre Desplat – A Prophet; Nicola Piovani – Welcome	Best Costume Design (presented by Élie Semoun) Catherine Leterrier – Coco Before Chanel: Chattoune and Fab – Coco Chanel & Igor Stravinsky; Madeline Fontaine – Micmacs; Charlotte David – OSS 117: Lost in Rio; Virginie Montel – A Prophet
Best Production Design (presented by Virginie Efira and François-Xavier Demaison) Michel Barthélémy – A Prophet: François-Renaud Labarthe – In the Beginning; Olivier Radot – Coco Before Chanel; Aline Bonetto – Micmacs; Maamar Ech Cheikh – OSS 117: Lost in Rio	Best Short Film (presented by Marc-André Grondin and Hafsia Herzi) C'est gratuit pour les filles: ¿Dónde está Kim Basinger?; La Raison de l'autre; Séance familiale; Les Williams
Best Documentary Film (presented by Emma de Caunes and Laurent Lafitte) L'Enfer d'Henri-Georges Clouzot: La Danse; Himalaya, le chemin du ciel; Home; My Greatest Escape (Ne me libérez pas je m'en charge)	Best Foreign Film (presented by Tony Gatlif) Gran Torino: Avatar; Milk; I Killed My Mother; A Town Called Panic; The White Ribbon; Slumdog Millionaire
Honorary César (presented by Sigourney Weaver) Harrison Ford

== Viewers ==
The show was followed by 1.7 million viewers on Canal+. This corresponds to 9.1% of the audience.

== Special tributes ==
During the ceremony, actor Fabrice Luchini presented a tribute to filmmaker Éric Rohmer, who had died the month before.

I’m gonna read a remarkable text written by Jacques Fieschi: "Writer, director; creator of “the cinematographe”, challenger of "Les cahiers du cinéma", which recently published a special edition on Eric Rohmer. Truffaut once said he was one of the greatest directors of the 20th century, Godard was his brother, Chabrol admired him, Wenders couldn’t stop taking photos of him. Rohmer is a tremendous international star. The one and only French director who was in coherence with the money spent on his films and the money that his films made. I remember a phrase by Daniel Toscan Du Plantier the day “Les Visiteurs” opened, which eventually sold 15 million tickets: “Yes but there is this incredible film called "L'arbre, le maire et la médiathèque" that sold 100,000 tickets, which may sound ridiculous in comparison, but no, because but it was only playing in one theater for an entire year." A happy time for cinema when this kind of thing could happen. Rohmer." Here is a tribute from Jacques Fieschi: "We are all connected with the cinema, at least for a short time. The cinema has its economical laws, its artistic laws, a craft that once in a while rewards us or forgets us. Eric Rohmer seems to have escaped from this reality by inventing his own laws, his own rules of the game. One could say his own economy of the cinema that served his own purpose, which could skip the others, or to be more accurate that couldn’t skip the audience with its originality. He had a very unique point of view on the different levels of language and on desire that is at work in the heart of each and every human being, on youth, on seasons, on literature, of course, and one could say on history. Eric Rohmer, this sensual intellectual, with his silhouette of a teacher and a walker. As an outsider he made luminous and candid films in which he deliberately forgot his perfect knowledge of the cinema in a very direct link with the beauty of the world." The text was by Jacques Fieschi and it was a tribute to Eric Rohmer, Thank You.

== See also ==
- 82nd Academy Awards
- 63rd British Academy Film Awards
- 22nd European Film Awards
- 15th Lumière Awards
- 55th David di Donatello
- 25th Goya Awards
