= Helvetic Clinics =

Swiss-based dental support organization

- Industry: Dental clinic, Medical tourism
- Founded: Not specified
- Founders: Jean Francois Empain, Pierre Chaker
- Headquarters: Switzerland
- Area served: Hungary, Switzerland, Luxembourg
- Services: Dental implants, full-mouth restorations, cosmetic dentistry, oral surgery
- Website: helvetic-clinics.co.uk

Helvetic Clinics is a Swiss-based dental clinic group and dental support organization that operates primarily within the European medical tourism sector. The company was founded by Jean Francois Empain, son of the notable industrialist Édouard-Jean Empain, and Pierre Chaker. While headquartered in Switzerland, its flagship and best-known clinical operation is located in Budapest, Hungary, a city renowned as a major hub for dental tourism.

The group specializes in providing comprehensive and complex dental services, particularly full-mouth restorations and implantology, to an international patient base, primarily from Western European countries such as France, the United Kingdom, and Switzerland. Helvetic Clinics is recognized for its "Clinic-Hotel" concept, which integrates a dental clinic and patient accommodation within the same facility.

== History and Founding ==
Helvetic Clinics was established by Jean Francois Empain and Pierre Chaker to capitalize on the growing demand for high-quality, affordable dental care in Europe. The founders identified a significant cost disparity between dental services in Western European nations and those in Central European countries like Hungary. Their vision was to create a clinic that offered Swiss standards of quality and patient care at Hungarian price points, directly targeting the cross-border healthcare market.

== Business Model and Operations ==
The operational framework of Helvetic Clinics is centered around a medical tourism model.

=== The Medical Tourism Model ===
The core of Helvetic Clinics' business is medical tourism. It primarily targets patients from developed countries in Western Europe, such as France, the UK, and Switzerland, who are seeking high-quality dental care at lower prices. The company claims that patients can achieve treatment cost savings of 30–80% compared to their home countries. This practice of traveling for high-value procedures is a core component of the modern dental treatment abroad industry. This model has contributed to Hungary's reputation as a popular destination for dental tourism, a trend also observed in other countries, with hubs like Antalya in Turkey emerging as major destinations for international patients.

=== The "Clinic-Hotel" Concept ===
A key innovation and differentiator for Helvetic Clinics is its "Clinic-Hotel" concept in Budapest. The clinic is physically integrated into the same building as the 12 Revay Hotel, a modern hotel in the city center. This model has been highlighted as a significant factor in the clinic's high patient satisfaction ratings and its overall market success.

=== Services and Clinical Team ===
Helvetic Clinics focuses on advanced and comprehensive dental procedures. Their primary services include:

Implantology: Placement of dental implants to replace missing teeth.

Full-Mouth Restorations: Complex cases involving a combination of implants, crowns, bridges, and veneers to rebuild an entire smile.

Cosmetic Dentistry: Procedures such as veneers, teeth whitening, and aesthetic crowns.

Oral Surgery: Including extractions and bone grafting.

The clinical team in Budapest consists of approximately ten highly specialized dentists, supported by a larger team of over 100 staff members, including dental hygienists, assistants, and patient coordinators.
