= 15th Lumière Awards =

2010 French film awards ceremony

- Date: 15 January 2010
- Site: Hôtel de Ville, Paris, France

Highlights
- Best Film: Welcome
- Best Director: Jacques Audiard
- Best Actor: Tahar Rahim
- Best Actress: Isabelle Adjani

The 15th Lumière Awards ceremony, presented by the Académie des Lumières, was held on 15 January 2010. The ceremony was presided by Régis Wargnier. Welcome won the award for Best Film.

== Winners and nominees ==
Winners are listed first and highlighted in bold.

Best Film	Best Director
**Welcome**: A Prophet; In the Electric Mist; Coco Before Chanel; In the Beginning	**Jacques Audiard — A Prophet**: Bertrand Tavernier — In the Electric Mist; Anne Fontaine — Coco Before Chanel; Philippe Lioret — Welcome; Xavier Giannoli — In the Beginning
Best Actor	Best Actress
**Tahar Rahim — A Prophet**: François Cluzet — In the Beginning; Yvan Attal — Rapt; Vincent Lindon — Welcome; Romain Duris — Persécution	**Isabelle Adjani — La Journée de la jupe**: Sandrine Kiberlain — Mademoiselle Chambon; Dominique Blanc — The Other One; Valeria Bruni Tedeschi — Regrets; Audrey Tautou — Coco Before Chanel
Most Promising Actor	Most Promising Actress
**Vincent Lacoste** & **Anthony Sonigo** — **The French Kissers**: Samy Seghir — Neuilly sa mère!; Fırat Ayverdi — Welcome; Maxime Godart — Little Nicholas	**Pauline Étienne** — **Silent Voice**: Christa Theret — LOL (Laughing Out Loud); Garance Le Guillermic — The Hedgehog; Mati Diop — 35 Shots of Rum; Julie Sokolowski — Hadewijch
Best Screenplay	Best French-Language Film
**Father of My Children** — **Mia Hansen-Løve**: A Prophet — Jacques Audiard, Thomas Bidegain, Abdel Raouf Dafri and Nicolas Peufaillit; Le Concert — Alain-Michel Blanc, Héctor Cabello Reyes, Thierry Degrandi, Radu Mihaileanu, Matthew Robbins; Welcome — Olivier Adam, Emmanuel Courcol, Philippe Lioret; The Ordinary People — Mathias Gokalp and Nadine Lamari	**I Killed My Mother**: Les Saignantes; That Day; Hand of the Headless Man; Beyond the Ocean
Best Cinematography	World Audience Award (presented by TV5Monde)
**Glynn Speeckaert** — **In the Beginning**	**Hand of the Headless Man** — **Guillaume Malandrin and Stéphane Malandrin**

== See also ==
- 35th César Awards
