= Wild Grass =

2009 film

- Film poster
- Directed by: Alain Resnais
- Written by: Alex Reval; Laurent Herbiet
- Story by: Christian Gailly
- Produced by: Jean-Louis Livi; Julie Salvador
- Starring: Sabine Azéma; André Dussollier; Anne Consigny; Emmanuelle Devos
- Narrated by: Édouard Baer
- Cinematography: Éric Gautier
- Edited by: Hervé de Luze
- Music by: Mark Snow
- Distributed by: StudioCanal
- Release date: 4 November 2009
- Running time: 104 minutes
- Country: France
- Language: French
- Budget: $13 million
- Box office: $4.8 million

Wild Grass (French: Les Herbes folles) is a 2009 French comedy-drama film directed by Alain Resnais. The film competed in the main competition at the 2009 Cannes Film Festival.

== Background ==
After working with the producer Bruno Pésery on his previous four films, Alain Resnais accepted an invitation from producer Jean-Louis Livi to make one with him. For a subject, he was drawn to the novels of Christian Gailly by the author's "ironic and melancholy voice", and also by the musical quality of his writing and dialogue. He settled upon L'Incident, and obtained Gailly's permission to adapt it for the cinema when he undertook not to require Gailly's involvement in the preparation of the script. Although Resnais had worked closely with novelists on some earlier projects, this was the first time in his career that he based a film on an existing novel.

== Plot ==
Marguerite Muir is a single, middle-aged, dentist. Georges Palet is unemployed, in his late 50s and married. When Georges discovers a wallet discarded from Marguerite's stolen handbag and hands it in to the police, he imagines the door opening to a romantic encounter. After the police give her his name and they connect, Marguerite initially has other ideas, but is later drawn towards him. Georges's wife Suzanne, Marguerite's best friend Josépha, and two policemen are drawn into the entanglement. Georges and Marguerite share a love of aviation. After Marguerite gives Georges the controls of a small plane, the plane performs aerobatics and disappears behind some trees.

== Cast ==
- Sabine Azéma as Marguerite Muir
- André Dussollier as Georges Palet
- Anne Consigny as Suzanne, the wife of Georges
- Emmanuelle Devos as Josépha, Marguerite's partner in their dental practice
- Mathieu Amalric as Bernard de Bordeaux, a local police officer
- Michel Vuillermoz as Lucien d'Orange, another police officer
- Sara Forestier as Élodie, the daughter of Georges and Suzanne
- Nicolas Duvauchelle as Jean-Mi, Élodie's husband
- Annie Cordy as Marguerite's neighbor
- Vladimir Consigny as Marcellin, the son of Georges and Suzanne
- Roger Pierre as Marcel Schwer, Marguerite's elderly patient
- Isabelle Des Courtils as Madame Larmeur (the mother with a laptop)
- Candice Charles as Elodie Larmeur (the little girl in bed)
- Patrick Mimoun as Jean-Baptiste Larmeur (the farmer in a field)
- Édouard Baer (voice) as the narrator

== Production ==
In preparing the script, Resnais used the dialogue from Gailly's novel, since this had been the element which had particularly attracted him initially, and he repeatedly made reference back to Gailly's style of writing when seeking a rhythm for the film narrative or a visual equivalence for the hesitations and contradictions within his sentences. He also encouraged his set designer Jacques Saulnier and his director of photography Éric Gautier to follow the spirit of Gailly in the way that they used bold and contrasted elements of colour in the film's visual design. The composer of the music Mark Snow provided similarly varied and clear-cut musical styles for different episodes.

In the two principal roles, Resnais used actors with whom he had worked many times before: Sabine Azéma, making her ninth appearance in a Resnais film, and André Dussollier, making his seventh appearance. For the main supporting roles Resnais chose three actors (Anne Consigny, Emmanuelle Devos and Mathieu Amalric) who were new to his films, but who had all worked together in films directed by Arnaud Desplechin (alongside cameraman Éric Gautier). (Resnais acknowledged his admiration for Desplechin elsewhere.) Roger Pierre, who first worked for Resnais on Mon oncle d'Amérique (1980), played the small part of the dentist's elderly patient who says that this will be the last dental appointment he needs; Pierre died in January 2010.

The story is presented with the help of a voiceover narrator (Édouard Baer) who is almost another character in the film since he seems to be inventing what we see on the spot, complete with hesitations and omissions and changes of tone. It is left to the audience to decide whether his observations about the characters that the audience watches are to be believed or not.

Resnais explained his alteration of the title to Les Herbes folles as a recognition that L'Incident would not work as successfully as a title in a cinematic context as it did for the novel. His "wild grass" refers to a plant that grows in a place where it has no hope of developing: in a crack in a wall, or a ceiling. In the film his principal characters are "two people who have no reason to meet, no reason to love each other". The image reflects the stubbornness of Georges and Marguerite "who are incapable of resisting the desire to carry out irrational acts, who display incredible vitality in what we can look on as a headlong rush into confusion".

The film incorporates a number of references to cinema, notably in excerpts from and discussion of the American war film The Bridges at Toko-Ri (1954). The fanfare which traditionally accompanied the 20th Century Fox logo is featured at two points, marking off a section of the film within the film. For one major sequence, Jacques Saulnier constructed in the studio an extensive set of a street scene in which a local cinema, evocative of bygone years, provides the focal point.

Towards the end of the film, there is an interpolated quotation (from Flaubert's L'Éducation sentimentale): "N'importe, nous nous serons bien aimés." ["No matter, we shall have loved each other well."]

The film was a French-Italian production budgeted at €11.1 million. Filming took place at the Arpajon studios near Paris.

== Reception ==
The film was first shown at the 2009 Cannes Film Festival in competition, and it resulted in a special jury prize for Alain Resnais as a "lifetime achievement award for his work and exceptional contribution to the history of cinema".

When the film was released in France in November 2009, reviews were predominantly favourable, with frequent reference to the originality and youthfulness of this work from an 87-year-old director. Public reaction was more varied, but the film achieved over 380,000 ticket sales in its first four weeks of distribution. The film ultimately reached 572,000 admissions in Europe.

At the French César Awards 2010, Les Herbes folles was nominated for four awards including Best Film and Best Cinematography.

Reactions to the film among English-language reviewers indicated a more polarised assessment, with a contrast between those who were unconvinced about either the coherence or the significance of the story and those who savoured its sense of humour and cinematic invention. Roger Ebert considered the movie a "young man's film made with a lifetime of experience" and called it a "visual pleasure."

Not all reviews were mixed, however. Keith Uhlich of Time Out New York named Wild Grass the best film of 2010: "Alain Resnais's stalker romance brilliantly confounds at every turn. The wry final passage raises it from comic to cosmic statement – what glorious fools we mortals be."
