= I Killed My Mother =

2009 film by Xavier Dolan

- Poster
- French: J'ai tué ma mère
- Directed by: Xavier Dolan
- Written by: Xavier Dolan
- Produced by: Xavier Dolan; Carole Mondello; Daniel Morin
- Starring: Xavier Dolan; Anne Dorval; Suzanne Clément; François Arnaud
- Cinematography: Stéphanie Weber Biron; Nicolas Canniccioni
- Edited by: Hélène Girard
- Music by: Nicholas Savard-L'Herbier
- Distributed by: K Films Amerique
- Release dates: 18 May 2009 (Cannes); 5 June 2009 (Canada)
- Running time: 96 minutes
- Country: Canada
- Language: French
- Budget: CA$800,000

I Killed My Mother (French: J'ai tué ma mère) is a 2009 Canadian coming-of-age drama film written, directed, produced by and starring Xavier Dolan, in his directorial debut. Loosely autobiographical, it follows the complicated relationship between a young man Hubert Minel (Dolan) and his mother (Anne Dorval). The film attracted international press attention when it won three awards from the Director's Fortnight program at the 2009 Cannes Film Festival. After being shown, the film received a standing ovation. It was shown in 12 cinemas in Quebec and 60 in France.

I Killed My Mother was announced as Canada's submission for the Academy Award for Best International Feature Film at the 82nd Academy Awards, but it was not nominated.

== Plot ==
The film begins with Hubert Minel giving a black-and-white monologue explaining how he loves his mother but cannot stand being her son; he also reveals that when he was younger, things were better between them.

Hubert is a 16-year-old Québécois living in suburban Montreal with his single mother, Chantale, who divorced Hubert's father, Richard, when Hubert was much younger. Hubert barely sees his father, and this adds to the animosity between mother and son. One morning, as his mother drives him to school, Hubert starts an argument with her about her applying makeup while driving. The argument ends when Chantale stops the car and tells him to walk to school. At school Hubert claims to his teacher, Ms Cloutier, that his mother is dead. After the teacher finds out that it is a lie, she expresses this lie as "you killed your mother." This inspires Hubert to write an essay for school titled "I killed my mother."

Later in the film, Hubert expresses to his mother that he wants to live in his own apartment. At first, his mother seems to agree, but the next day she has changed her mind and does not allow it, claiming that she thinks he is too young. Hubert's friend Antonin is revealed to be his boyfriend, but Hubert has not told his mother, and she finds out from Antonin's mother, who assumed that Chantale already knew. Chantale, to some extent, accepts her son's homosexuality; however, she appears hurt that he did not tell her.

The relationship between mother and son continues to deteriorate, and Hubert goes to live with his teacher, pretending to be staying with his boyfriend. Hubert's father invites him over for a visit; however, once there, Richard and Chantale tell Hubert they've decided to send him to a boarding school in Coaticook. Hubert is deeply angered that his father makes the decision, since Hubert only sees his father at Christmas and Easter.

At the Catholic boarding school, Hubert meets Eric, with whom he cheats on Antonin. Eric invites Hubert to go to a nightclub with the other students, where they kiss and Hubert takes speed. He takes the Metro home, wakes his mother, and has an emotional conversation with her. The next morning, she takes Hubert to Antonin's mother's workplace to help drip the walls in paint. He and Antonin finish, and he lays down. Antonin proceeds to lay on top of him and kiss him, and they end up having sex. Hubert, later at home, finds out that his mother has enrolled him for another year at the boarding school. Because of this, Hubert trashes his mother's bedroom, but soon after, he calms down and cleans it up. The two fight, and Chantale sends Hubert to Antonin's house, from which he returns to school the next day.

Back at school, Hubert is beaten by two fellow students. This causes Hubert to run away from school. The school's principal calls Chantale to inform her of the developments, revealing the note Hubert left, saying he will be "In his kingdom". Chantale knows exactly where Hubert's "kingdom" is; the house he lived in as a child with both his parents. The principal also begins to lecture Chantale, which causes her to have an angry outburst at him, saying how he thinks he's better than her and how he has no right to judge a single mother. Hubert runs away with the help of Antonin, who has borrowed his mother's car. On the journey, Antonin tells Hubert that he is selfish and only cares about himself, but adds that he loves him.

Indeed, she finds Hubert and Antonin there. Chantale sits next to Hubert overlooking the beach. The film ends with a home video clip of Hubert as a child playing with his mother.

== Cast ==
- Xavier Dolan as Hubert Minel
- Anne Dorval as Chantale Lemming, Hubert's mother
- Suzanne Clément as Julie Cloutier, Hubert's teacher
- François Arnaud as Antonin Rimbaud, Hubert's boyfriend
- Niels Schneider as Éric, a boy at the boarding school
- Patricia Tulasne as Hélène Rimbaud, Antonin's mother
- Pierre Chagnon as Richard Minel, Hubert's father
- Monique Spaziani as Denise, Chantale's friend
- Benoît Gouin as Principal Nadeau, the boarding school principal

== Production ==
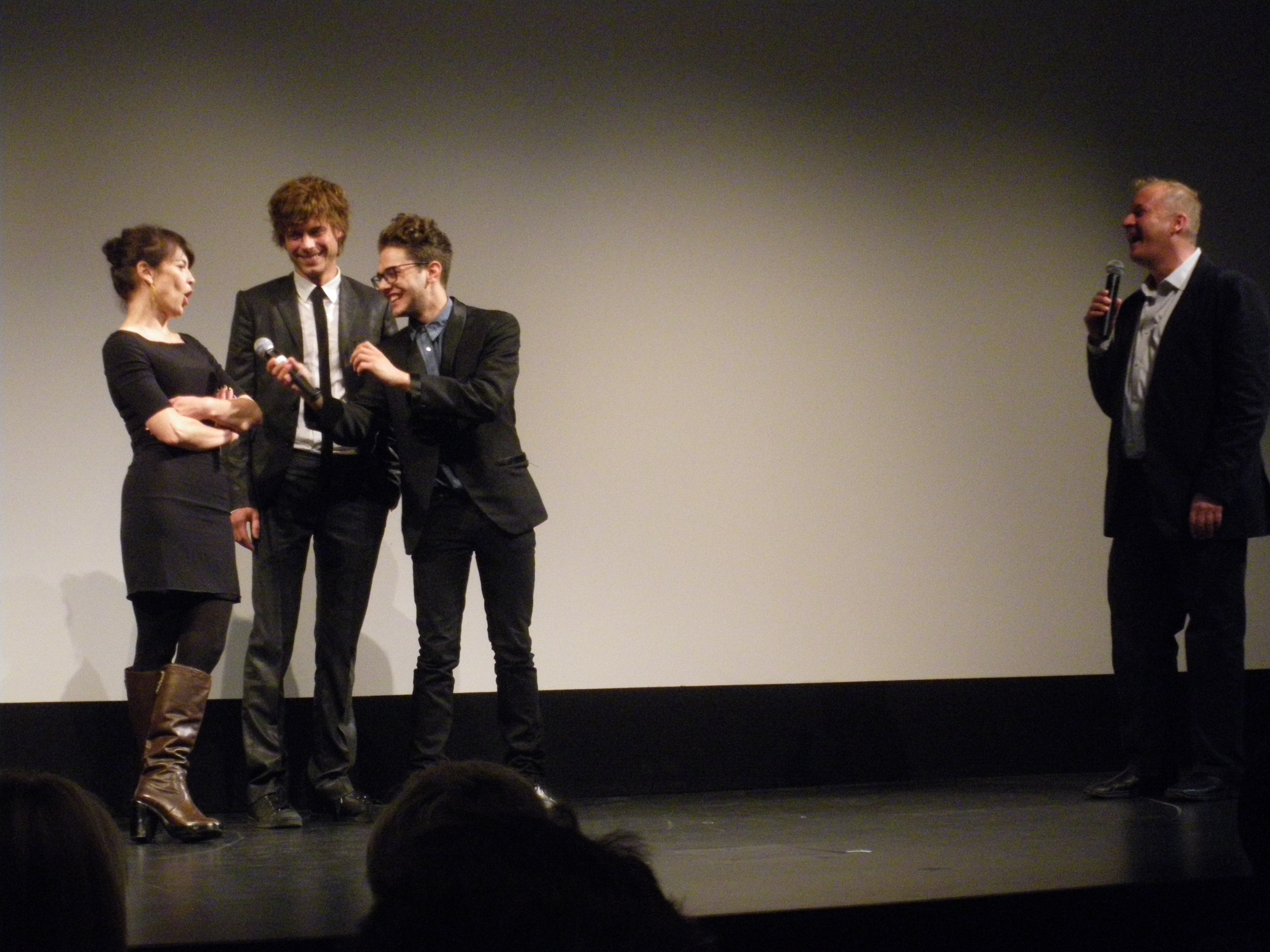
Anne Dorval, François Arnaud, and Xavier Dolan on stage for a Q&A at the 2009 Toronto International Film Festival.

Xavier Dolan wrote the script when he was 16 years old. He said in an interview with Canadian newspaper Le Soleil that the film was partly autobiographical.

The film was at first financed by Dolan, but when need for more money arose, he asked both Téléfilm and the SODEC for subsidies. Both turned him down for different reasons. SODEC, who had loved the project but refused to finance it because it was submitted to a too commercial department, encouraged Dolan to submit it again in the more appropriate "indie" department, which he did.

In December 2008, SODEC gave him a $400,000 subsidy. In all, the film cost around $800,000 CAD. Dolan said that the system to acquire funding is "[...] an obsolete financing mechanism that holds the creative assets of Quebec hostage."

== Reception ==
=== Critical response ===
The film received generally positive reviews from critics. The review aggregator website Rotten Tomatoes reports an approval rating of 87%, with an average rating of 7.1/10 based on 23 reviews. The website's consensus reads, "I Killed My Mother's raw, blunt coming-of-age narrative marks an impressive debut for filmmaker Xavier Dolan." Metacritic assigned the film a weighted average score of 77 out of 100, based on 9 critics, indicating "generally favorable reviews".

Peter Howell from the Toronto Star said that "What makes it extraordinary is its depth of feeling, which Dolan's age makes all the more impressive: he was just 19 when he made this." Peter Brunette from The Hollywood Reporter called it "Uneven but funny and audacious adolescent comedy from a talented beginner."

=== Accolades ===
On 22 September 2009, Telefilm announced the film had been selected as Canada's submission for Best Foreign Language film at the 82nd Academy Awards. Despite this, it received no nominations at the 30th Genie Awards and received only the Claude Jutra Award for best directorial debut. Kevin Tierney, vice-chairman of cinema for the Academy of Canadian Cinema and Television, criticized the overlook, comparing it to "being sent to the kiddie table".

Award	Date of ceremony	Category	Recipient(s)	Result	Ref(s)
Cannes Film Festival	13–24 May 2009	C.I.C.A.E. Award	Xavier Dolan	Won	
Cannes Film Festival	13–24 May 2009	Prix Regards Jeune	Xavier Dolan	Won	
Cannes Film Festival	13–24 May 2009	SACD Prize (Directors' Fortnight)	Xavier Dolan	Won	
César Awards	27 February 2010	Best Foreign Film	Xavier Dolan	Nominated	
Genie Awards	12 April 2010	Claude Jutra Award	Xavier Dolan	Won	
Jutra Awards	28 March 2010	Best Film	Xavier Dolan, Carole Mondello and Daniel Morin	Won	
Jutra Awards	28 March 2010	Best Director	Xavier Dolan	Nominated	
Jutra Awards	28 March 2010	Best Screenplay	Xavier Dolan	Won	
Jutra Awards	28 March 2010	Best Actor	Xavier Dolan	Nominated	
Jutra Awards	28 March 2010	Best Actress	Anne Dorval	Won	
Jutra Awards	28 March 2010	Most Successful Film Outside Quebec	Xavier Dolan, Carole Mondello and Daniel Morin	Won	
Lumière Awards	15 January 2010	Best French-Language Film	Xavier Dolan	Won	
Palm Springs International Film Festival	January 2010	Women's Performing Award	Anne Dorval	Won	
Reykjavík International Film Festival	September 2009	Golden Puffin	Xavier Dolan	Won	
Toronto Film Critics Association	16 December 2009	Stella Artois Jay Scott Prize	Xavier Dolan	Won	
Vancouver International Film Festival	October 2009	Best Canadian Film	Xavier Dolan	Won	
Vancouver Film Critics Circle	11 January 2010	Best Canadian Film	Xavier Dolan	Won	
Vancouver Film Critics Circle	11 January 2010	Best Director of a Canadian Film	Xavier Dolan	Won	
Vancouver Film Critics Circle	11 January 2010	Best Actor in a Canadian Film	Xavier Dolan	Won	
Vancouver Film Critics Circle	11 January 2010	Best Supporting Actor in a Canadian Film	François Arnaud	Won	
Zagreb Film Festival	October 2009	Best Feature Film	Xavier Dolan	Won	

== See also ==
- List of submissions to the 82nd Academy Awards for Best Foreign Language Film
- List of Canadian submissions for the Academy Award for Best Foreign Language Film
