= François Fabius =

French equestrian

- Born: François Élie Louis Fabius; 28 July 1944; Bourg-en-Bresse, France
- Died: 13 August 2006 (aged 62); Paris, France
- Education: École du Louvre
- Occupation: Antiquarian • Equestrian
- Relatives: Laurent Fabius (brother); Catherine Leterrier (sister)

François Fabius (28 July 1944 in Bourg-en-Bresse – 13 August 2006 in Paris) was a French antiquarian and equestrian.

A graduate of École du Louvre, Fabius was a managing partner of the Galerie Fabius Frères, founded by his father André Fabius and his uncle Pierre. He was a specialist on the 14th century. In 1998, his gallery was the scene of a major burglary. A hundred works of art, including animal bronzes of Barye were stolen.

Fabius was a French junior champion in horse racing in 1962 and was a member of the French riding team from 1962 to 1972. In 1972, he competed at the Summer Olympics in Munich in both the individual and team eventing competitions.

He was the brother of Prime Minister Laurent Fabius and costume designer Catherine Leterrier.
