= Le Concert =

2009 French comedy-drama film

- Theatrical release poster
- Directed by: Radu Mihăileanu
- Written by: Radu Mihăileanu; Héctor Cabello Reyes; Thierry Degrandi; Matthew Robbins; Alain-Michel Blanc
- Produced by: Alain Attal
- Starring: Aleksei Guskov; Mélanie Laurent; Dmitry Nazarov; François Berléand; Miou-Miou; Lionel Abelanski
- Cinematography: Laurent Dailland
- Edited by: Ludo Troch
- Music by: Armand Amar; Tchaikovsky
- Production companies: EuropaCorp; Wild Bunch; France 3 Cinema
- Distributed by: Europa Filmes (France); Cineart (Belgium); BIM Distribuzione (Italy); Independența Film (Romania); Ruscico (Russia)
- Release dates: September 2009 (Russia); 4 November 2009 (France)
- Running time: 119 minutes
- Countries: France; Belgium; Italy; Romania; Russia
- Languages: French; Russian
- Budget: $14.2 million
- Box office: $41.1 million

Le Concert is a 2009 comedy-drama film by Radu Mihăileanu, starring Aleksei Guskov, Mélanie Laurent and Miou-Miou. It won the Best Original Score and Best Sound awards at César Awards 2010. It was also nominated for two Magritte Awards in the category of Best Film in Coproduction and Best Editing for Ludo Troch in 2011, and Best Foreign Film at the 68th Golden Globe Awards.

== Plot ==
A former world-famous conductor of the Bolshoi Theatre orchestra, known as "The Maestro", Andrey Simonovich Filipov, had had his career publicly broken by Leonid Brezhnev for defending Jewish musicians and is reduced to working as a mere janitor in the theatre where he once conducted, becoming an alcoholic in the process.

While cleaning his boss's office, he intercepts an official invitation from the prestigious Théâtre du Châtelet in Paris to replace a concert of the Los Angeles Philharmonic Orchestra that was canceled at the last minute. Filipov comes up with a plan to reunite his old orchestra, composed of old Jewish and Gypsy musicians – who also have been reduced to making a living as movers or taxi drivers – to perform in Paris and complete a performance of Tchaikovsky's Violin Concerto, which was interrupted 30 years earlier by former KGB Agent Ivan Gavrilov, who is enrolled by Filipov in his scheme as the orchestra's manager and is actively and efficiently supporting Filipov's plan, much to the dismay of Aleksandr 'Sasha' Abramovich Grossman (the orchestra's main cellist), because he suspects that Gavrilov has his own agenda for the Paris trip.

Gavrilov and Filipov demand several conditions from the Châtelet, that they are forced to accept, since the concert with the Bolshoi is significantly less expensive. One condition is that the solo violinist will be Anne-Marie Jacquet, who famously has never played Tchaikovsky's concerto because she is afraid of it. She has long dreamed of playing it with the Bolshoi and particularly with Filipov, whose fame outside of Russia has not diminished. Her agent, Guylène de La Rivière, who is also Anne-Marie's adoptive mother, is reluctant to allow that because she is acquainted with Filipov and his past, but Anne-Marie insists, and de la Riviere has no option but to accept. The orchestra is also forced to accept the sponsorship of an open Russian mafia boss who likes to play the cello, despite the fact that he does so terribly and who wants to be part of the orchestra.

Once in Paris, the entire orchestra disappears, partying and raising money in other jobs such as taxi drivers, movers or translators. The unprofessionalism of the Russian musicians and Anne-Marie's own impression that the performance serves as a means of catharsis for Filipov forces Anne-Marie to call off her participation in the concert. But La Rivière convinces her to come to the theater because the Concert holds the key to Anne-Marie's past and her parents, whom she has never met, and whom she believes to be scientists who died during her infancy in the Alps. As it turns out, Filipov and his wife Irina were best friends of Lea and Yitzhak Strum, also Jewish musicians. Lea was an accomplished violinist and the soloist at the time of the interrupted concert thirty years before in Moscow. After the public humiliation they suffered under Gavrilov and the entire Brezhnev regime, the couple spoke openly against the government on Radio Free Europe, an American radio station that was banned in the former USSR. As a result, they were deported to Siberia, where they spent the rest of their lives. Lea, Anne-Marie's mother, lost her mind and played the Tchaikovsky concert in her imagination every day for her husband until her death in 1981. Her husband died six months later. Guylène, at the time the representative of a visiting French orchestra, had managed to escape with Baby Anne-Marie hidden in a cello case, at the behest of Irina, Filipov, and Sasha.

At the last moment, the entire orchestra, after receiving an SMS message calling them to play in honor of Lea, appears at the Theatre despite the fact that not a single rehearsal has taken place. In the meantime, the real manager of the Bolshoi, who happened to be vacationing in Paris and learned by chance about the concert, appears at the theatre to prevent the performance, but he is intercepted by Gavrilov, who locks him in a broom closet. The concert has a wobbly beginning due to the lack of rehearsals – even Gavrilov, who actually intended to speak at a Communist Party meeting, asks God to demonstrate his existence by salvaging the situation. However, the orchestra manages to reach Filipov's ideal of spontaneous harmony once Anne-Marie mesmerizes everyone with her magnificent interpretation of the solo part, which she had studied on her mother's annotated score. The concert is a huge success and Filipov is able to restart his career as a conductor of the new "Andreï Filipov Orchestra" along with Anne-Marie, who joins him in a world tour.

== Cast ==
- Aleksei Guskov as Andreï Filipov
- Mélanie Laurent as Anne-Marie Jacquet and Lea Strum (her mother)
- Dmitry Nazarov as Sacha Grossman
- François Berléand as Olivier Morne Duplessis
- Miou-Miou as Guylène de La Rivière
- Valery Barinov as Ivan Gavrilov
- Lionel Abelanski as Jean-Paul Carrère
- Laurent Bateau as Bertrand
- Vlad Ivanov as Pyotr Tretyakin
- Guillaume Gallienne as a critic
- Ramzy Bedia as Ahmed
- Anghel Gheorghe as Vassili (Taraf de Haïdouks)
- Anna Kamenkova as Irina Filipova

== Production ==
To prepare for her role, Laurent spent five months studying violin with Sarah Nemtanu of the Orchestre National de France. Nemtanu is also the violin soloist throughout the film.

== Music ==
Le Concert

Soundtrack album by Armand Amar
- Released: 2 November 2009
- Genre: Classical
- Label: Columbia Records

The film's original score was composed by Armand Amar with one track written by Radu Mihăileanu ("Le Trou Normand"). The musical work which has a central role in the film and is played during the final scene is the Violin Concerto in D major, Op. 35 by Tchaikovsky. Classical selections by Mahler, Mendelssohn, Mozart and Khachaturian are also included on the soundtrack.

1. "Andreï I"
2. "S'Il Vous Sied"
3. "Nani, Nani" (Kek Lang Chants Roms)
4. "Place Rouge I"
5. "Andreï II"
6. "Merci Bolchoï"
7. "Kalinka"
8. "100% Des Voix"
9. "Kalou"
10. "Je Vous Baise Chaleureusement"
11. "Symphonie N°1 Titan"
12. "Ci-Gît"
13. "Danse Du Sabre Remix"
14. "Piano Concerto No. 21 in C major, K. 467"
15. "Andreï III"
16. "Tziganie"
17. "Le Trou Normand"
18. "Ai Routchiok" (Traditional)
19. "Place Rouge II"
20. "Je Régule L'Addition"
21. "Sir Bina Ya Qitâr" (Les Musiciens du Nil)
22. "Je Suis Ravissant De Vous Rencontrer"
23. "Andreï IV"
24. "Les Russes Sont Comme Des Mûles"
25. "Avant Le Concert"
26. "Violin Concerto in D major, Op. 35"
27. "Concert, Concert"
28. "Vous Avez Voulu Des Russes"

== Accolades ==
Award / Film Festival	Category	Recipients and nominees	Result
César Awards	Best Film		Nominated
César Awards	Best Director	Radu Mihaileanu	Nominated
César Awards	Best Original Screenplay	Alain-Michel Blanc and Radu Mihaileanu	Nominated
César Awards	Best Editing	Ludo Troch	Nominated
César Awards	Best Original Music	Armand Amar	Won
César Awards	Best Sound	Pierre Excoffier, Bruno Tarriere and Selim Azzazi	Won
European Film Awards	Best Screenwriter	Alain-Michel Blanc and Radu Mihaileanu	Nominated
Golden Globe Awards	Best Foreign Language Film		Nominated
Lumière Awards	Best Screenplay	Alain-Michel Blanc and Radu Mihaileanu	Nominated
Magritte Awards	Best Film in Coproduction		Nominated
Magritte Awards	Best Editing	Ludo Troch	Nominated
Nashville Film Festival	Audience Award for Best Narrative Feature		Won
Traverse City Film Festival	Audience Award		Won

== Bibliography ==
- The Concert – Film Review. The Hollywood Reporter
