= Rapt (film) =

- Film poster
- Directed by: Lucas Belvaux
- Written by: Lucas Belvaux
- Produced by: Patrick Sobelman; Diana Elbaum; Sébastien Delloye
- Starring: Yvan Attal
- Cinematography: Pierre Milon
- Edited by: Danielle Anezin
- Music by: Riccardo Del Fra
- Distributed by: Diaphana Films
- Release dates: 18 November 2009 (France); 9 December 2009 (Belgium)
- Running time: 125 minutes
- Countries: France; Belgium
- Language: French
- Budget: $6 million
- Box office: $3 million

Rapt is a 2009 French-Belgian dramatic film directed by Lucas Belvaux and starring Yvan Attal. It was nominated for 4 César Awards in 2010, including Best Film. It was released in France on 18 November 2009.

The film is inspired by the true story of the kidnapping of Édouard-Jean, 3rd Baron Empain, a very wealthy Hungarian-born Belgian aristocrat and CEO of the Schneider-Empain conglomerate, which occurred in Paris in January 1978.

== Plot ==
Stanislas, a wealthy and high-profile businessman, is kidnapped and held for ransom. The kidnappers amputate one of his fingers and send it to his business with their demands for 50 million euros. His family comes into conflict with the police and his corporate associates as they struggle to raise the money. His business associates refuse to pay the ransom from corporate funds, but will loan the amount he will be able to repay, 20 million. Stanislas is kept in darkness, unwashed, with little food, repeatedly made to write desperate notes to his family.

Details of his mistresses and gambling losses emerge in the media. His wife, Francoise, and teenage daughters are traumatized. His business colleagues use it as an opportunity to turn against him. His mother rebukes his wife for not meeting his needs at home. The family refuses to cooperate with the police. When they try to deliver the ransom, police surveillance disrupts the exchange. After two months, the kidnappers arrange for another exchange. The family is now cooperating with the police, who again disrupt the exchange but take one of the criminals into custody. The kidnappers devise a new scheme. They release Stanislas after he agrees that he will secretly pay them off. They will enforce the agreement by killing a random person and tying the death to his failure to pay.

Stanislas is released to his distraught wife and two daughters who demand explanations for his affairs and gambling, publicity for which they have suffered during his captivity. Only his dog is happy to see him. His business associates explain his reputation prohibits his return and, when he refuses to resign, tell him he will be removed. The authorities suspect that he arranged his own kidnapping to pay off his gambling debts and force him to submit to questioning. Meeting with his attorney, he signs papers selling his shares in the business and postpones discussion of his divorce. His attorney advises him to relaunch his life, wealthy and unattached. In his mail, he receives the kidnappers' note that he must prepare to pay the agreed upon ransom.

== Cast ==
- Yvan Attal as Stanislas Graff
- Anne Consigny as Françoise Graff
- André Marcon as André Peyrac
- Françoise Fabian as Marjorie
- Alex Descas as Maître Walser
- Michel Voïta as Le commissaire Paoli
- Patrick Descamps as Massart
- Gérard Meylan as Le Marseillais
- Pierre Rochefort as Fostier

== Critical response ==
On Rotten Tomatoes, the film holds an approval rating of 97%, based on 31 reviews, with an average rating of 7.6/10. On Metacritic the film has a score of 71 out of 100, based on 16 critics, indicating "generally favorable reviews".

== Accolades ==
Award / Film Festival	Category	Recipients and nominees	Result
César Awards	Best Film		Nominated
César Awards	Best Director	Lucas Belvaux	Nominated
César Awards	Best Actor	Yvan Attal	Nominated
César Awards	Best Supporting Actress	Anne Consigny	Nominated
Lumière Awards	Best Actor	Yvan Attal	Nominated
