= Firat Ayverdi =

Kurdish film actor

Firat Ayverdi is a Kurdish film actor, born in 1990, best known for his lead role as young Bilal in French director Philippe Lioret's film Welcome about illegal immigration, a film that co-stars French actor Vincent Lindon.

In 2010, Ayverdi was nominated for the prestigious French César Awards "Meilleur espoir masculin" (Most Promising Male Actor) for his role. But the award went to Tahar Rahim for his role in A Prophet.

His sister Derya Ayverdi is also an actress and has appeared in the same film Welcome.
