= One for the Road (2009 film) =

- Directed by: Philippe Godeau
- Written by: Philippe Godeau; Agnès de Sacy
- Based on: Le Dernier pour la route by Hervé Chabalier
- Produced by: Philippe Godeau
- Starring: François Cluzet
- Cinematography: Jean-Marc Fabre
- Production companies: Pan-Européenne; StudioCanal
- Distributed by: Wild Bunch
- Release date: 23 September 2009
- Running time: 106 minutes
- Country: France
- Language: French
- Budget: $8 million
- Box office: $5.6 million

One for the Road (French: Le Dernier pour la route) is a 2009 French film directed by Philippe Godeau and starring François Cluzet. Based on reporter Hervé Chabalier's autobiography about his battle with alcoholism, the story takes place in a French Alps retreat where Herve (Cluzet) confronts his dangerous addiction. The film received five nominations at the César Awards 2010 with Mélanie Thierry winning Most Promising Actress.

== Cast ==
- François Cluzet as Hervé Chabalier
- Mélanie Thierry as Magali
- Michel Vuillermoz as Pierre
- Anne Consigny as Agnès
- Marilyne Canto as Carol
- Bernard Campan as Marc
- Riton Liebman as Martin
