= Catherine Leterrier =

French costume designer

- Born: Catherine Fabius; 26 October 1942 (age 84); Aix-les-Bains, Savoie, France
- Occupation: Costume designer
- Years active: 1970–present
- Spouse: François Leterrier (m. 1970; died 2020)
- Children: Louis Leterrier
- Relatives: François Fabius (brother); Laurent Fabius (brother)

Catherine Leterrier (née Fabius; born 26 October 1942) is a French costume designer. She received three César Awards, in addition to nominations for an Academy Award and a BAFTA Award.

Leterrier was married to filmmaker François Leterrier until his death in 2020. They had one child, the director Louis Leterrier, in 1973. She is the older sister of antiquarian François Fabius and politician Laurent Fabius.

== Selected filmography ==
Year	Title	Director	Notes
1973	Projection privée	François Leterrier	
1973	France, Inc.	Alain Corneau	
1975	That Most Important Thing: Love	Andrzej Żuławski	
1975	Lovers Like Us	Jean-Paul Rappeneau	
1976	Silence... on tourne	Roger Coggio	
1977	Providence	Alain Resnais	
1977	The Accuser	Jean-Louis Bertucelli	
1977	Goodbye Emmanuelle	François Leterrier	
1977	Tendre poulet	Philippe de Broca	
1977	Julie pot-de-colle	Philippe de Broca	
1977	Violette & François	Jacques Rouffio	
1978	Le Sucre	Jacques Rouffio	
1979	French Postcards	Willard Huyck	
1979	Le cavaleur	Philippe de Broca	
1980	Jupiter's Thigh	Philippe de Broca	
1980	My American Uncle	Alain Resnais	
1980	The Formula	John G. Avildsen	
1980	Je vais craquer !!!	François Leterrier	
1981	Les Uns et les Autres	Claude Lelouch	
1981	Les Babas Cool	François Leterrier	
1981	Psy	Philippe de Broca	
1981	Rends-moi la clé !	Gérard Pirès	
1982	All Fired Up	Jean-Paul Rappeneau	
1982	L'Étoile du Nord	Pierre Granier-Deferre	
1982	The Passerby	Jacques Rouffio	
1983	Édith et Marcel	Claude Lelouch	
1983	Life Is a Bed of Roses	Alain Resnais	
1983	Gramps Is in the Resistance	Jean-Marie Poiré	
1983	La crime	Philippe Labro	
1984	Viva la vie	Claude Lelouch	
1984	Love Unto Death	Alain Resnais	
1984	The Twin	Yves Robert	
1985	Slices of Life	François Leterrier	
1985	Partir, revenir	Claude Lelouch	
1986	Mélo	Alain Resnais	
1987	La vie dissolue de Gérard Floque	Georges Lautner	
1988	Gorillas in the Mist	Michael Apted	
1988	L'Étudiante	Claude Pinoteau	
1989	La Révolution française	Robert Enrico; Richard T. Heffron	
1989	I Want to Go Home	Alain Resnais	
1990	May Fools	Louis Malle	
1991	Meeting Venus	István Szabó	
1991	The Old Lady Who Walked in the Sea	Laurent Heynemann	
1992	Salt on Our Skin	Andrew Birkin	
1992	Max et Jérémie	Claire Devers	
1993	Les Visiteurs	Jean-Marie Poiré	
1993	La Soif de l'or	Gérard Oury	
1994	Prêt-à-Porter	Robert Altman	
1994	La Vengeance d'une blonde	Jeannot Szwarc	
1996	Fantôme avec chauffeur	Gérard Oury	
1997	Les Soeurs Soleil	Jeannot Szwarc	
1998	The Visitors II: The Corridors of Time	Jean-Marie Poiré	
1999	The Messenger: The Story of Joan of Arc	Luc Besson	
2000	The Divine Inspiration	Claus Drexel	Short film
2001	J'ai faim !!!	Florence Quentin	
2001	Un aller simple	Laurent Heynemann	
2002	The Truth About Charlie	Jonathan Demme	
2002	Vendredi soir	Claire Denis	
2003	Bon Voyage	Jean-Paul Rappeneau	
2004	Changing Times	André Téchiné	
2005	How Much Do You Love Me ?	Bertrand Blier	
2005	Palais Royal!	Valérie Lemercier	
2006	Avenue Montaigne	Danièle Thompson	
2006	A Good Year	Ridley Scott	
2007	After Him	Gaël Morel	
2008	Mes stars et moi	Laetitia Colombani	
2009	Coco Before Chanel	Anne Fontaine	
2009	Change of Plans	Danièle Thompson	
2011	My Worst Nightmare	Anne Fontaine	
2012	Amour	Michael Haneke	
2013	Girl on a Bicycle	Jeremy Leven	
2013	The Ultimate Accessory	Valérie Lemercier	
2013	Des gens qui s'embrassent	Danièle Thompson	
2014	Three Hearts	Benoît Jacquot	
2015	The Scent of Mandarin	Gilles Legrand	
2016	Cézanne and I	Danièle Thompson	
2016	From the Land of the Moon	Nicole Garcia	
2017	Happy End	Michael Haneke	
2017	Marie-Francine	Valérie Lemercier	
2021	Aline	Valérie Lemercier	
2025	Dust Bunny	Bryan Fuller	with Olivier Bériot

== Awards and nominations ==
Association	Year (Note: Indicates the year of ceremony. Each year is linked to the article about the awards held that year, wherever possible.)	Category	Work	Result
Academy Awards	2010	Best Costume Design	Coco Before Chanel	Nominated
British Academy Film Awards	2010	Best Costume Design	Coco Before Chanel	Nominated
César Awards	1987	Best Costume Design	Mélo	Nominated
César Awards	1990	Best Costume Design	La Révolution française	Nominated
César Awards	1994	Best Costume Design	Les Visiteurs	Nominated
César Awards	2000	Best Costume Design	The Messenger: The Story of Joan of Arc	Won
César Awards	2004	Best Costume Design	Bon Voyage	Nominated
César Awards	2004	Best Production Design	Bon Voyage	Won
César Awards	2010	Best Costume Design	Coco Before Chanel	Won
César Awards	2016	Best Costume Design	The Scent of Mandarin	Nominated
César Awards	2017	Best Costume Design	From the Land of the Moon	Nominated
César Awards	2022	Best Costume Design	Aline	Nominated
Costume Designers Guild Awards	2010	Excellence in Period Film	Coco Before Chanel	Nominated
European Film Awards	2009	Prix d'Excellence	Coco Before Chanel	Nominated
Fangoria Chainsaw Awards	2026	Best Costume Design	Dust Bunny	Nominated
Gala Québec Cinéma	2022	Best Costume Design	Aline	Nominated
Las Vegas Film Critics Society Awards	2000	Best Costume Design	The Messenger: The Story of Joan of Arc	Nominated
