= Silent Voice (2009 film) =

- Film poster
- Directed by: Léa Fehner
- Written by: Léa Fehner; Catherine Paillé
- Produced by: Philippe Liégeois; Jean-Michel Rey
- Starring: Farida Rahouadj; Reda Kateb; Pauline Étienne
- Cinematography: Jean-Louis Vialard
- Edited by: Julien Chigot
- Music by: Luc Meilland
- Production company: Rézo Productions
- Distributed by: Rézo Films
- Release date: 9 December 2009
- Running time: 120 minutes
- Country: France
- Languages: French; Arabic

Silent Voice (French: Qu'un seul tienne et les autres suivront; also known as Silent Voices) is a 2009 French drama film written and directed by Léa Fehner. The film won the Louis Delluc Prize for Best First Film in 2009. The film also received two nominations at the 35th César Awards.

== Cast ==
- Farida Rahouadj as Zorha
- Reda Kateb as Stéphane
- Pauline Étienne as Laure
- Marc Barbé as Pierre
- Vincent Rottiers as Alexandre
- Julien Lucas as Antoine
- Dinara Droukarova as Elsa
- Michaël Erpelding as François
- Fanny Avram as Femme du parvis
- Edmonde Franchi as La mère de Stéphane
- François Fehner as La mère de Laure

== Accolades ==
Award / Film Festival	Category	Recipients and nominees	Result
Louis Delluc Prize	Best First Film	Silent Voice	Won
Cabourg Film Festival	Male Revelation	Vincent Rottiers	Won
César Awards	Best First Feature Film	Silent Voice	Nominated
César Awards	Most Promising Actress	Pauline Étienne	Nominated
Lumière Awards	Most Promising Actress	Pauline Étienne	Won
Étoiles d'Or	Best Female Newcomer	Pauline Étienne	Won
Deauville Film Festival	Michel d'Ornano Award	Léa Fehner	Won
