= Édouard-Jean Empain =

French-Belgian industrialist

- Born: 7 October 1937; Budapest, Kingdom of Hungary
- Died: 21 June 2018 (aged 80); Pontoise, France
- Occupation: Industrialist
- Title: Baron
- Spouse(s): Silvana Betuzzi (1957–1978) Jacqueline Ragonaux (m. 1990)
- Children: 3, including Jean Francois Empain

Édouard-Jean, 3rd Baron Empain (7 October 1937 – 21 June 2018) was a French-Belgian industrialist, best known by the general public for his kidnapping in 1978.

Between 1969 and 1981, Baron Empain was CEO of the Schneider group (Schneider-Empain).

== Biographical details ==
The Baron was the son of Jean, 2nd Baron Empain, and the grandson of Édouard Louis Joseph, 1st Baron Empain. He married the Italian Silvana Betuzzi in 1957 by whom he had two daughters and a son: they were divorced shortly after Empain's kidnapping. He lived in the suburbs of Paris with his second wife Jacqueline (née Ragonaux), a former model, whom he married in 1990.

His abduction left a deep impression on him. He claims he has never been the same since. The newspapers dissected his private life during his confinement, "revealing his taste for gambling and the existence of his bachelor pad. A whiff of scandal that wounded the Baron, so discreet until then, even more fiercely than his two months in captivity".

== Career before the kidnapping ==
In 1978, Édouard-Jean Empain was a Belgian nobleman living in Paris. A wealthy heir at the age of forty-one, he had been chairman and CEO of the Empain-Schneider group (later Schneider Electric) since 1971. He was one of France's leading businessmen, (Note: In 1976, he became the first foreigner to be admitted to the Conseil national du patronat français (CNPF), according to creusot.net) with a group of almost three hundred companies, one hundred and fifty thousand employees and sales of twenty-two billion francs. The Empain-Schneider group included companies such as Framatome (nuclear boilers), Creusot-Loire (metallurgy), Jeumont-Schneider, Cerci, Citra and Spie Batignolles (construction). (Note: Since 1999, the Group, which has undergone profound changes, has been officially named Schneider Electric.)

== Kidnapping ==
=== Capture on Avenue Foch ===
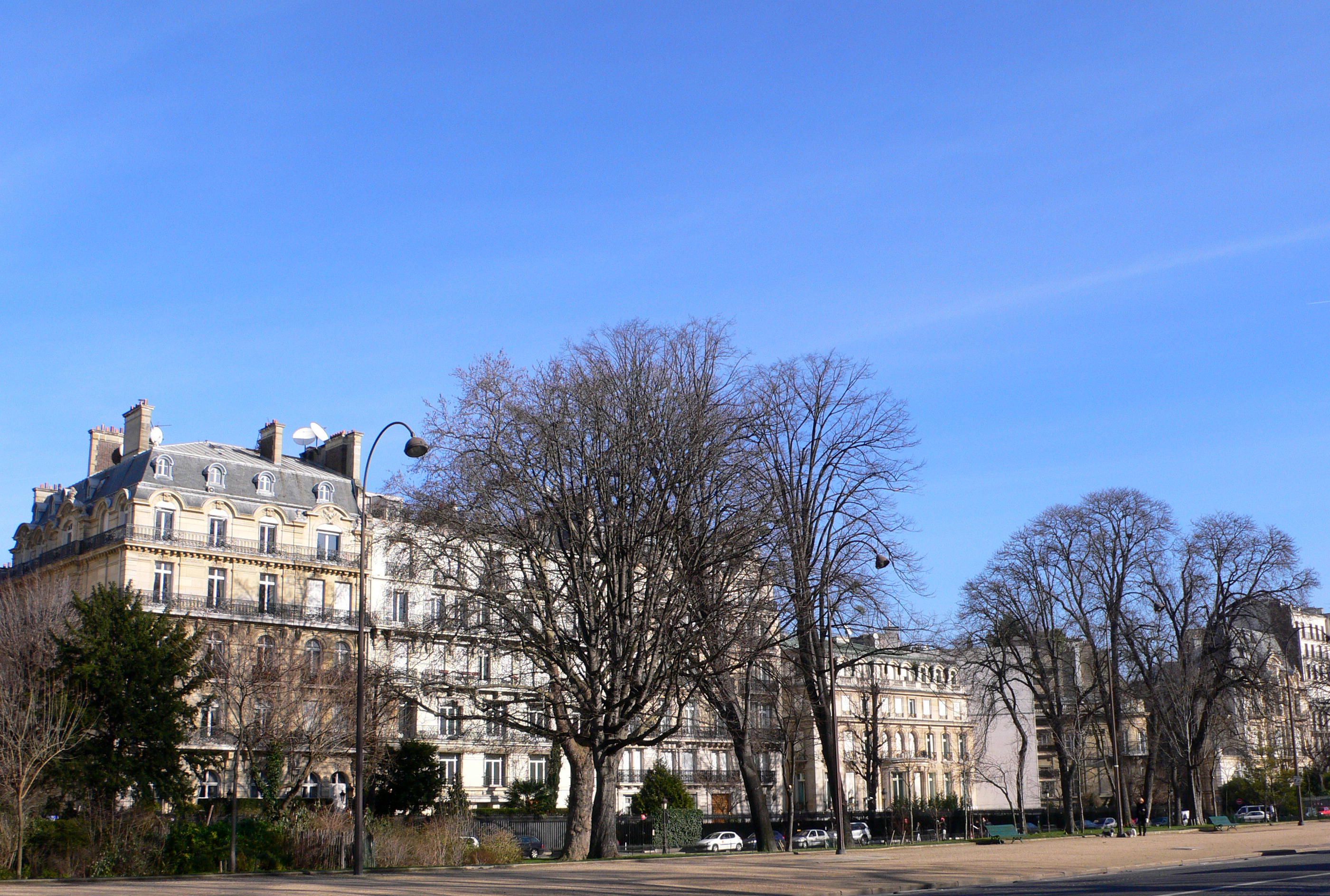
Avenue Foch, the location of the kidnapping.

On Monday, January 23, 1978, at approximately 10:30am, Édouard-Jean, 3rd Baron Empain, was picked up as usual from his home at 33 Avenue Foch, a prestigious address in the 16th arrondissement of Paris, a stone's throw from the Arc de Triomphe.

The Baron's chauffeured car, a Peugeot 604, was intercepted at a junction some 50 metres after it had left his home. A moped slid across the road, faking an accident in order to bring his car to a halt next to a parked van. Once the car had stopped several armed men removed the driver from the vehicle and bundled him into the van, while the Baron was quickly handcuffed and the kidnappers made off in his car. The Baron's car was found some hours later in an underground parking structure but contained no usable fingerprints.

Despite the lack of detailed evidence provided by witnesses, the circumstances of the kidnapping were rapidly made known to the public. In the hope of recovering the Baron, the police put in place traffic stops throughout Paris and its suburbs but to no avail.

=== Initial investigation ===
Empain's driver Jean Denis, who was released close to Porte Maillot, told investigators that he had been handcuffed at gunpoint and thrown into the back of a van, and as such had not seen the faces of the kidnappers. He overheard one of them speaking in German, however, which led the authorities to think that the crime might have been committed by an extreme-left group affiliated with the Red Army Faction. That scenario was persuasive as the kidnapping of Empain came on the heels of the kidnapping and the assassination of the German industrialist Hanns Martin Schleyer by the Red Army Faction.

The police quickly installed themselves in Empain's family home. Presuming that the kidnappers would contact the family, they tapped the phones and kept the house under surveillance so that the family would not try to deal directly with the kidnappers.

French president Valéry Giscard d'Estaing, who was close to Empain at the time, advised Interior Minister Christian Bonnet and Attorney General Alain Peyrefitte to put together a crisis team. Peyrefitte called on the public to 'denounce the criminals', and Socialist Party First Secretary François Mitterrand talked of the 'decline of civilisation'. A team similar to that of the government was set up by the Schneider group to represent its interests in the affair. The group comprised René Engen (Empain's right-hand man) and Robert Badinter (Empain's lawyer) as well as the former director general of the police, Max Fernet, who was employed by the group as a 'technical consultant'.

=== First message from kidnappers ===
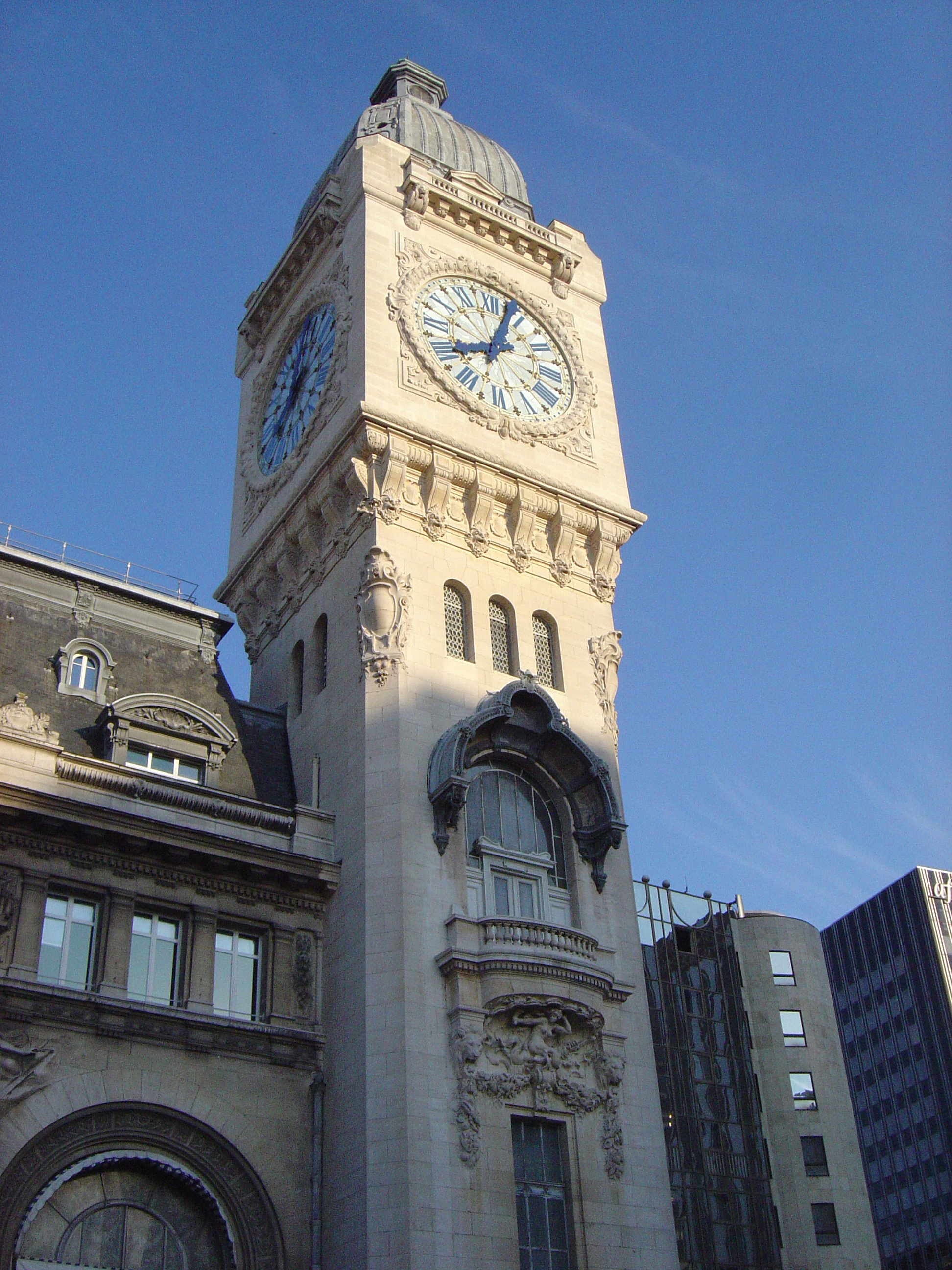
The belfry of the Gare de Lyon, known as the Clock Tower.

On Tuesday January 24, 1978, the day after the kidnapping, the radio station RTL received a call from a group purporting to be responsible:

"We, Armed Core Groups for Popular Autonomy, claim responsibility for the kidnapping of Baron Empain.
We demand the liberation of our comrades before noon on Wednesday (Note: i.e. the following day (January 25th).) if not we will kill the Baron.
Other businessmen will follow..."

The Armed Core Groups for Popular Autonomy (NAPAP) was an extreme-left, French guerrilla organisation which had claimed responsibility for the kidnapping of a number of foreign diplomats. Although this lead supported the initial police theory, which was echoed in the press, that the kidnapping was politically motivated, the family had in fact received an anonymous telephone call from the real kidnappers which they relayed to the police. The call, which came from the Rue Anjou, close to the headquarters of the Schneider group, demanded that someone go to the Gare de Lyon to collect a message left in locker 595. One of the members of the group, along with the police, proceeded directly to the station where they found the Baron's identity card, a number of letters from the kidnappers, a note from the Baron (including a message to his wife) and a small package.

The kidnappers demanded 80 million francs in ransom and seemed extremely determined. The package the police found in the locker contained the Baron's left little finger preserved in formaldehyde. The family were increasingly unnerved as the letter stipulated that further body parts would follow if the ransom was not paid.

=== Six days wait ===
Six days passed without news from the kidnappers. The police widened their investigation into the Baron's private life in order to discover whether the kidnapping had motives other than financial gain.

Numerous routes of inquiry were followed. The Baron's passion for poker to which he devoted many of his evenings and a considerable sum of money suggested a possible mafia connection. The investigation revealed that the Baron had lost 11 million francs a few weeks earlier and had to take out a loan to cover the debt. The press quickly got wind of these revelations and the hypothesis that the Baron had staged his own kidnapping to cover his gambling debts was forwarded. It was the Baron's numerous affairs, however, which grabbed the public's attention and served to damage his previously untarnished reputation.

Affected by these revelations, the Empain family became increasingly hostile towards journalists. Despite the family's silence, the press maintained a constant presence outside the Baron's home. To add to the media interest, the police refused to confirm the amputation of the Baron's finger which provoked widespread speculation.

At the same time, the kidnappers sent a further letter to the Baron's eldest daughter Patricia, who was married to American oil and ranch heir Terrell Braly. Written in the Baron's own hand and dictated by the kidnappers, the letter specified the procedure for the transfer of the ransom and reminded the family not to alert the police. The family and the Empain-Schneider group did not immediately warn the police, preferring to handle the situation themselves. However the increasing silence of those close to the Baron excited the suspicion of the police who placed the family under heightened surveillance. This surveillance allowed the police to discover the existence of secret negotiations between the group and the kidnappers with the group having the aim of reducing the sum demanded from 80 million francs to 30 million. The family and the group both thought that it would be better to pay the ransom whereas the police refused to contemplate this course of action as setting a dangerous precedent. After much discussion, the group allowed themselves to be convinced by the police to pay a fake ransom, which was a great disappointment to the family, especially the Baron's wife, Silvana Empain, who feared it would put her husband's life in peril.

=== Relative calm period ===
Four weeks after the kidnapping, on Monday February 20, 1978 a telephone call placed by the kidnappers to the Schneider group's headquarters indicated that the ransom had been reduced to 40 million francs without further negotiations.

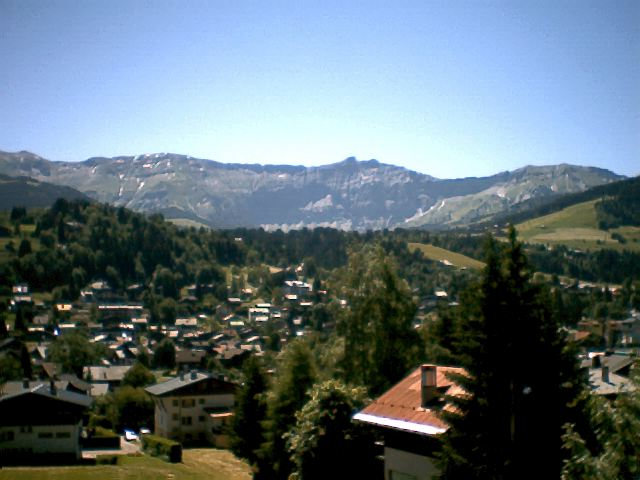
View of Megève.

The rendezvous set by the kidnappers was to take place two days later at Megève, a winter resort in Haute-Savoie. A radio communication system was rapidly deployed in the area by the police to facilitate the operation. The police examined the numerous possible methods the kidnappers could use for their ingress and egress and in order that the unmarked police cars used were not spotted their Parisian licence plates were changed.

Inspector Jean Mazzieri, a skilled martial artist, was chosen to carry out the ransom delivery under the guise of Mr. Mazo, a fictitious aide of the Baron.

=== Megève episode ===
On the day of the rendezvous, Wednesday February 22, 1978, Jean Mazzieri made his way to the Le Chalet du Mont d'Arbois hotel where he was supposed to receive a telephone call from Félix le Chat who would ask for Jacques Dupond and arrange another meeting place for the exchange. He had with him two holdalls containing a mix of bank notes and paper designed to mimic on cursory inspection the ransom of 17 million Swiss francs. The area was under surveillance by numerous plain clothes police who were ready to intervene if necessary. The kidnappers did not call however and the operation was cancelled later that evening.

=== Contact ===
Seven weeks after the kidnapping, on Friday March 17, 1978, Pierre Salik, a Belgian businessman who was close to the Baron, received a telephone call at his Brussels office. The kidnappers wished to contact René Engen and had called Salik to avoid the telephone surveillance that the French police had put in place. Engen immediately returned from a business trip to Luxembourg and went to the arranged rendezvous at the Hilton hotel in Brussels where he was to await a telephone call. From this call he learned that a new exchange would be arranged and he would receive the details in the post. The letter which he received, written by Empain at the behest of his kidnappers, warned Engen that it was "life or death" for the Baron if the police were involved. The police were nonetheless informed and rapidly organised an operation to oversee the new rendezvous, which was to take place on Thursday March at 15:00 at Fouquet's restaurant on the Champs-Élysées.

=== Parisian excursion ===
On the day of the rendezvous, it was again officer Jean Mazzieri who was to carry the ransom, still under the guise of the Baron's aide. He was to expect a telephone call from Charlotte Corday who would ask for a Mr. Marat and question the respondent to ensure that the police were not involved. A further rendezvous was arranged at the Le Murat café where Mazzieri was to receive another telephone call. Throughout his journey Mazzieri was discreetly followed by armed police officers. At the second café Mazzieri was told to look for a road map at the bottom of a bin near to one of the entrances to the Porte d'Auteuil metro station. The map instructed Mazzieri to proceed to a third café, Le Rond Point, in Porte d'Orléans and defined a precise route as well as a maximum speed of 50 km/h. The map also stipulated that the car should take a service road, which had been specially opened by the kidnappers to make sure that Mazzieri was not followed by the police. Mazzieri could at all times contact the other police officers by radio to update them on his location.

A second road map hidden at Le Rond Point sent Mazzieri to Antony where he was to enter a car park and exchange his vehicle for one left by the kidnappers. This meant Mazzieri could no longer update his colleagues by radio. The glovebox of the car contained the address of a new meeting place, the Les Trois Obus café, situated near to the Porte de Saint-Cloud metro station. From there he received instructions to proceed to the Hilton hotel in Orly. Here, after six hours of travel around Paris and its suburbs, he received a call from the kidnappers who, using the darkness as a pretext, told Mazzieri that it was too late to undertake the exchange and rescheduled it for the following day.

=== Arrest ===
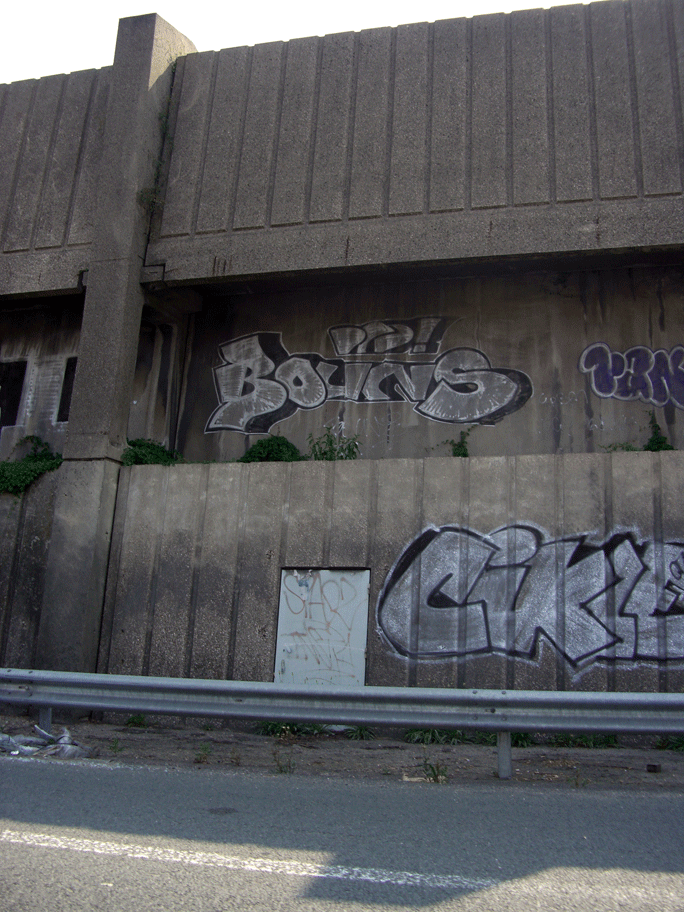
Part of the motorway soundproofing wall showing the service door, near L'Haÿ-les-Roses.

In the early evening of the following day, Friday March 24, 1978, while waiting at the bar of the Orly Hilton, Mazzieri received a telephone call instructing him to fill up his petrol tank and prepare for a further excursion. Upon his return to the bar, Mazzieri received a second call telling him to head on to the A6 motorway in the direction of Paris and stop on the hard shoulder at emergency telephone point B16.

Soon after the car had come to a stop on the hard shoulder a tow truck pulled in behind Mazzieri, believing him to have broken down. Mazierri got out of the car to tell the driver of the tow truck to move along and it was at this moment that two of the kidnappers, who had been hiding nearby, made off in Mazzieri's car. The kidnappers stopped the car a few hundred metres further down the hard shoulder next to a service door in the 20m high soundproofing wall which lines the motorway. This door had already been opened by the kidnappers to aid their escape and they boobytrapped it with a grenade to prevent pursuit by the police. The kidnappers had also stationed an accomplice armed with a submachine gun on top of the wall to cover their escape and this man opened fire on the police as they attempted to pursue the kidnappers. A firefight then took place between the kidnappers and the police in which one of the kidnappers was killed and another arrested. Two police officers were wounded, inspectors Berux and Lailheugue. The man who was killed was Daniel Duchâteau, a convicted bank robber, the man who was arrested called himself Alain and was at that time unknown to the police.

=== Release ===
On Sunday March 26, 1978, the police interrogated the captured kidnapper who called himself Alain Caillol and tried to induce him to call the kidnappers and tell them to release their hostage. The police eventually convinced him to contact his accomplices after guaranteeing that they would not be arrested. Police commissioner Ottavioli proposed that Alain call the kidnappers from his personal phone, which was not under surveillance. Alain called twice telling his accomplices "it's over, the ransom has been seized, we must avoid carnage and release the baron". After these calls Alain told the police that "it's 99% certain: the release of the baron is close". A tape recorder attached to the telephone allowed the police to identify the number using the Touch-Tone waveform and trace the call.

Two hours later, before the call was traced, the baron was released. After several months of investigation all of the kidnappers were arrested apart from one who was killed in a firefight during his arrest. Over the course of the investigation, 24,000 vehicles were stopped and 12,000 homes were visited. The kidnapping lasted 63 days.

== The captivity ==
According to his testimony, Baron Empain was first taken to a ruined house with no water or electricity. Chained by the neck, he was then locked in an orange camping tent set up in the former Hennocque quarry in Méry-sur-Oise. All contact with the kidnappers took place after the hostage had donned a balaclava, preventing him from identifying his interlocutors. The mutilation of a phalanx with a guillotine on the first day of detention, although dramatic, reassured him as a sign of the kidnappers' intention not to kill him immediately. The baron suspected that such a large ransom could not be paid, since the kidnappers had abducted, in his words, "the only person with money". He therefore hoped that they would settle for a smaller sum, (Note: Around seven million francs.) making it possible for his relatives to collect and pay the ransom. During his imprisonment, the Baron hardly ever saw the light of day, causing him to become depressed. The kidnappers tried to improve his conditions of captivity, for example by giving him a small bedside lamp.

After the Megève attempt, the nervous kidnappers changed their hiding place. The Baron was transported in a nailed crate. The new location was not as cold as the first, and Empain was provided with a reading lamp and a small television, which he left on all the time. According to Empain's testimony, the kidnappers were trying to gain time because, in their view, the more time that passed, the greater the chances of obtaining a ransom. According to him, the kidnappers had set a very high ransom with the aim of collecting a high but lower ransom.

On Friday March 24, 1978 the Baron was released following an appeal from Alain Caillol. Hooded and wearing a blue jogging suit with white stripes, he was abandoned on a vacant lot in a street in Ivry-sur-Seine, near Paris, with a ten-franc bill. It was the first time he had walked for two months. He made his way with difficulty towards a nearby metro station, relieved to be in Paris. He got off at the Opéra station and phoned home to inform his wife of his release. Madame Empain and the police arrived immediately and took the Baron home. In the car, he broke into tears. On April 7, 1978, a photograph of the Baron taken by the kidnappers while he was in custody appeared on the cover of Paris Match with the headline "Empain enchaîné" ("Empain in chains").

Alain Caillol, one of the kidnappers, would later reveal certain details in his book Lumière (2012), such as the fact that the man who cut the phalanx had been drawn to the short straw, or the fact that they had voted on the possible murder of the hostage after a month's confinement due to negotiation difficulties.

== The reunion ==
The reunion of "Wado", as he was known to those close to him, with his wife went badly. "I knew you were going out that evening" were the only words she uttered, without any apparent emotion, giving the impression of minimizing the drama that had just ended. She wanted the Baron to go straight to the police to make a statement, while he, having been released, was determined to go home and make his statement later. The untreated wound on his finger was causing him pain, and he was exhausted, malnourished, lacking in physical effort, and had lost twenty kilos. He was hospitalized the next day at the American Hospital of Paris, Neuilly-sur-Seine.

His place of detention, identified by the police thanks to the location of Alain Caillol's call to his accomplice, was the cellar of a bungalow in Savigny-sur-Orge, twenty-six kilometers from Paris, deserted by its occupants before the arrival of the police. However, the names of the tenants and some investigative work enabled them to find the people involved, who, to the surprise of the police, were by no means major figures in organized crime.

Shortly after his release, the Baron decided to divorce his wife. Those close to him wanted explanations for the press revelations about his private life. The Empain-Schneider group, managed in his absence by associates, now had to face up to his return, and the Baron's now public "antics" posed a problem. Leaving one "prison" for another, the Baron declared that he much preferred the former. When he learned of the way the operation had been carried out, he was deeply affected by the behavior of those around him, explaining that if he had known about it when he was being held prisoner, he would have "let himself die". Disappointed by the people around him and the reception he received, he left France to live in the United States for six months, "with jeans and a backpack", to get away from it all. He remarried a Frenchwoman and severed most of his ties with the French business community.

In the months following his kidnapping he received many letters of support, and for many years avoided returning to Avenue Foch, where he had been abducted. On September 7, 1978, several months after his release, he gave his first press conference. He confessed to having been pressured not to speak to the press before this date, and acknowledged that this event had changed his way of seeing things, concluding: "Deprivation of liberty is an unbearable state. You know, the important things are to be able to shower and have breakfast in peace every morning". A "different man", he explained that he forgave his kidnappers, but not the police, for having smeared him by suggesting that it could have been an organized self-kidnapping to pay off his debts, and for having revealed his extramarital affairs to his family. He was also surprised by the behavior of those close to him: "I expected to be welcomed differently. Instead of friendship and love, they immediately spoke to me, without waiting for me to recover, about a number of facts from my private life, and asked me to respond". His collaborators also disappointed him: "I can no longer trust anyone, because I've never been able to find out what really happened during my confinement. I found the group's attitude strange". In February 1981, the Baron left the Group, selling his stake to the Paribas bank.

Talking about his 1970s, he says: "All I had to do was move on. People went to bed! A minister would ask me something: if I said no, he wouldn't insist. I've always been a gambler. In 1978, I had a few slates left and right. I didn't really know how to settle them, but as I was the living God, it didn't matter." After his kidnapping, those days were behind him.

== The trial ==
On December 2, 1982, four years after the events, the trial of the "Empain affair" began. It lasted sixteen days, presided over by Judge Chavagnac. Paradoxically, the immediate focus was on the victim, not the accused. For the first time, Baron Empain saw the faces of his eight living kidnappers, six men and two women, including a pimp from Marseilles and his wife, the brothers François and Alain Caillol, Georges Bertoncini aka "Joe le marseillais", (Note: Georges Bertoncini committed suicide in 2001 at the Luynes prison. Released after a 15-year sentence for the Empain affair, in June 2000 he was again sentenced to 22 years' imprisonment for international cocaine trafficking (see L'ex-ravisseur du baron Empain meurt en prison , Libération.fr, February 20, 2001).) his brother-in-law Marc Le Gayan and Bernard Guillon. They seemed to him to be "little guys" of no stature. He publicly announced that he had forgiven them so that the sentence would not be too harsh, confirming what he had said at his first press conference. Indeed, on the strength of his experience of two months without freedom, he was aware of the harshness of this sentence over a long period.

The defense argued that the defendants were merely executors, intermediaries for an unknown sponsor who was too dangerous for them to dare denounce him. The defendants tried to pin responsibility for the most serious acts on Daniel Duchâteau, the kidnapper killed during the shoot-out on the Autoroute du Sud, and on another, killed during a robbery in December 1978. The discovery of plane tickets to Majorca proved that these people, who claimed not to know each other, had in fact all been there together for a week to plan the kidnapping. A court-ordered re-enactment took place on June 27, 1979, at the Savigny-sur-Orge pavilion.

During the trial, the kidnappers stated that they had chosen the baron from a list of three personalities: Marcel Dassault, Baron de Rothschild and him. Later, they would mention Liliane Bettencourt and Claude François, who lived and worked on boulevard Exelmans like Baron Empain. His habits, his precise and regular schedule and his stronger physical constitution, enabling him to better withstand detention, as well as the side alley of his home, making it easier to abduct him, determined the choice of his kidnappers. In court, the defendants apologized to the baron. The trial also gave Baron Empain the opportunity to explain himself, and thus rehabilitate his image. Then the owner of a small business with fifteen employees, he recounted his ordeal with modesty and dignity, without seeking to accuse the defendants and refusing to give "the sordid details". He adds: "It was a nightmare. I wouldn't wish it on my worst enemy". In fact, his invective was directed more towards those closest to him and his collaborators – the real culprits, in his view. He also explained how, after his release and before the arrest of his kidnappers, he continued to live in fear because he had signed an IOU for thirty-five million francs under threat and, failing payment, his kidnappers threatened to randomly kill strangers in the street by pinning a copy of the document on them.

The sentences handed down to the kidnappers ranged from fifteen to twenty years' imprisonment. Their accomplices were sentenced to between two and five years.

== In popular culture ==
- The song Le Prix d'un homme sung by Michel Sardou on his album Je vole (1978), evokes the Empain affair.
- The film Rapt (2009) from Lucas Belvaux was inspired on the Empain affair.

== See also ==
- List of kidnappings
- Lists of solved missing person cases

== Bibliography ==
- Édouard-Jean Empain, La Vie en jeu, Éditions Jean-Claude Lattès, October 1985. (in French) ISBN 978-2-7096-0430-7
- Christophe Hondelatte, Marie-Sophie Tellier et Hugues Raffin, L'Enlèvement du baron Empain, Éditions Michel Lafon, April 2006. (in French) ISBN 978-2-7499-0444-3
- Yvon Toussaint, Les Barons Empain, Éditions Fayard, January, 1996 (in French). ISBN 978-2-213-03126-2
- Alain Caillol, Lumière, Éditions Le Cherche midi, January 19, 2012 (in French). ISBN 978-2749123233
- Dominique Sels, Un sanglier dans le salon, éditions de la Chambre au Loup, December 26, 2013 (in French). ISBN 978-2-9528451-7-5, chap. 4 : « Alain Caillol ». This same chapter is included in volume 1 of the kindle digital edition, entitled Sept salons Botul, January 2014 ASIN B00HTNRF86, ISBN 978-2-9528451-9-9.

=== Documentaries and TV programs ===
- « L'enlèvement du baron Empain » – Faites entrer l'accusé in France 2 on April 10, 2005 Official website .
- Words from hostages Jean-Claude Raspiengeas and Patrick Volson (1989). The story of three hostages : Gerhard Vaders, Édouard-Jean Empain et Jean-Paul Kauffmann, VHS, TF1 Video, 1990. First broadcast of the documentary in France, on TF1 in 1990.
- L'affaire Empain, TF1 20h news June 27, 1979, reconstitution of the kidnapping INA
- Édouard Jean Empain, Cartes sur table, A2 September 18, 1978, INA
- Comment ils ont changé de vie (2012). Presentation by Mireille Dumas and first broadcast in France in France 3 on May 14, 2012. Édouard-Jean Empain and Alain Caillol were invited to join on set.
- « L'affaire du baron Empain : deux mois sans voir le jour » le March 29, 2018 on Enlèvements in C8.
- « Qui a enlevé ces millionnaires français » – Héritages on NRJ 12 of February 16, 2021. Second story of the episode « Baron Empain: cet enlèvement qui a bouleversé les français ».

Belgian nobility
Preceded by Jean, 2nd Baron Empain	Baron Empain; 1946-2018	Succeeded by Jean Francois, 4th Baron Empain
