= Baron Empain =

Belgian noble title

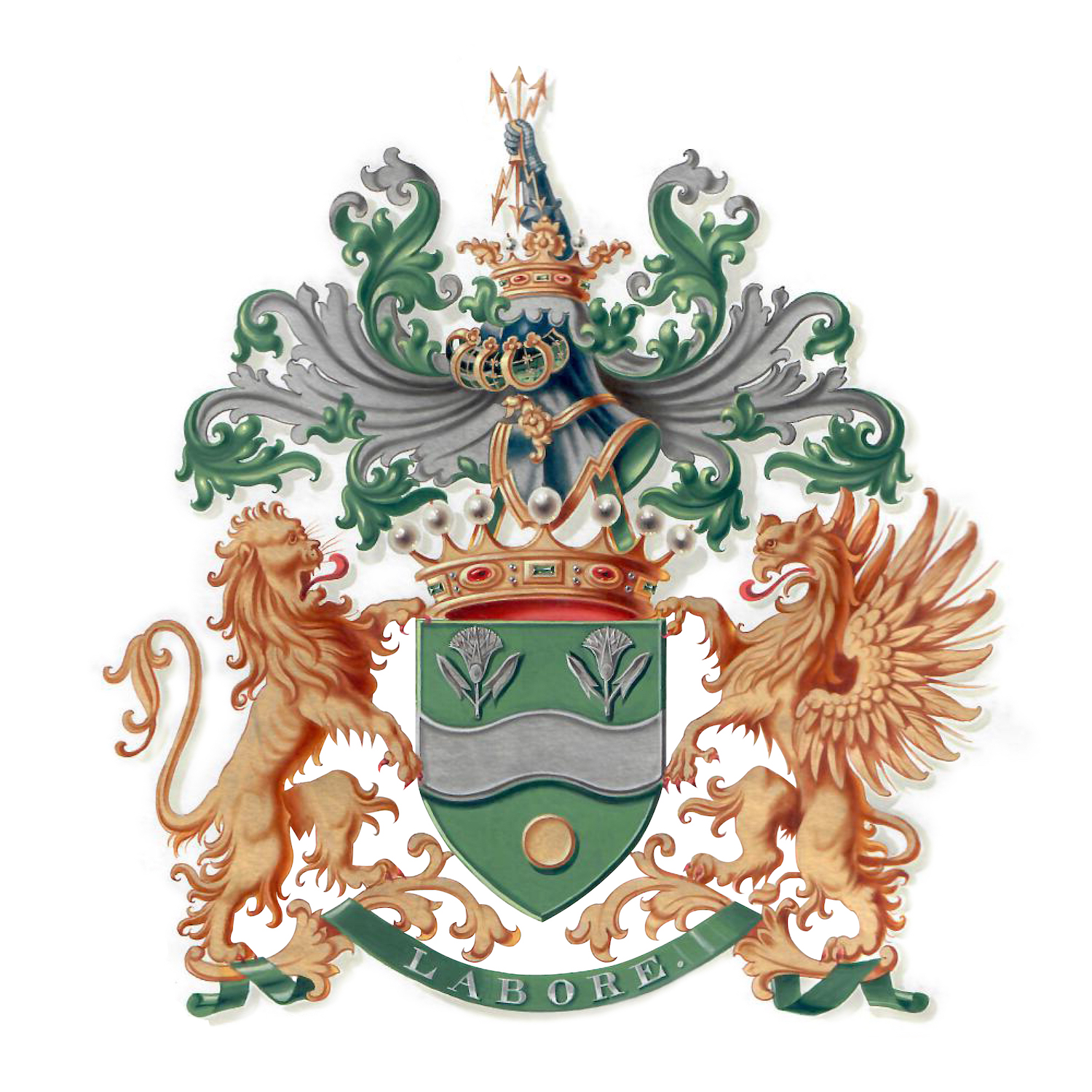

Baron Empain is a title of nobility of the Kingdom of Belgium. The title was created in 1907 by Leopold II of Belgium for Édouard Empain, a wealthy Belgian engineer, entrepreneur, financier and industrialist, as well as an amateur Egyptologist. The title is hereditary and descends to the senior male by agnatic primogeniture.

The Baron Empain Palace in Heliopolis, Cairo, was renovated and opened to public June 30, 2020.

== Barons Empain (1907) ==
- Édouard Empain, 1st Baron Empain (1852-1929)
- Jean Empain, 2nd Baron Empain (1902-1946)
- Édouard-Jean Empain, 3rd Baron Empain (1937-2018)
- Jean Francois Empain, 4th Baron Empain (b.1964)
