= Terrell Braly =

American businessman (born 1953)

Terrell Alfred Braly (born 1953) is an American businessman.

== Biography ==
=== Early life ===
His great-great grandfather, J. Oliver Russell, along with his brothers William G. Russell, Levi Russell and James Russell, discovered gold in the Colorado Territory in 1858 and are credited with founding Denver and starting the Pikes Peak Gold Rush. He was born on December 1, 1953, in San Antonio, Texas. He began school in England and France before his family settled in Marin County, CA in 1961. He attended 3R schools and San Rafael Military Academy and graduated from Babson College in Wellesley, MA. in 1977.

=== Career ===
He founded Sandwich World in Denver, CO which was purchased and later became Quiznos. An association with Tom Hulett of Concerts West led to his becoming a leading concert promoter in the 1980s producing such acts as The Beach Boys, Huey Lewis and the News, America, The Eagles and many other top acts of the era.

He took control of National Video Industries in New York City in 1991 producing music videos, documentaries, short films and commercials including A Great Day in Harlem which was nominated for an Academy Award for Best Documentary.

In 2001, he returned to Texas to look after family business interests. He soon took control of a small Austin cinema eatery, the Alamo Drafthouse Cinema, and grew it from a five-screen company to what was called by Entertainment Weekly in 2005 "The Best Theater in America". Terrell also founded, with Tim League, the franchise division with the first franchise being in Houston, TX. He sold his interests shortly thereafter.

In 2007, he formed a joint venture with the Regal Entertainment Group called Cinebarre and became its CEO/Chairman. Cinebarre now has locations nationally in cities including Charlotte NC, Charleston SC, Thornton CO, Boulder CO, Seattle, WA, Issaquah WA and Salem, OR.

Controlling interest was sold to Regal Entertainment Group in December 2015.
