= Coco Before Chanel =

2009 film by Anne Fontaine

- French theatrical release poster
- French: Coco avant Chanel
- Directed by: Anne Fontaine
- Written by: Anne Fontaine; Camille Fontaine
- Based on: Chanel and Her World by Edmonde Charles-Roux
- Produced by: Simon Arnal; Caroline Benjo; Philippe Carcassonne; Carole Scotta
- Starring: Audrey Tautou; Benoît Poelvoorde; Alessandro Nivola; Marie Gillain; Emmanuelle Devos
- Cinematography: Christophe Beaucarne
- Edited by: Luc Barnier
- Music by: Alexandre Desplat
- Production companies: Haut et Court; Ciné@; France 2 Cinéma
- Distributed by: Warner Bros. Pictures
- Release dates: 6 April 2009 (Paris); 22 April 2009 (France and Belgium)
- Running time: 105 minutes
- Countries: France; Belgium
- Languages: French; English
- Budget: $22.2 million
- Box office: $50.8 million

Coco Before Chanel (French: Coco avant Chanel) is a 2009 biographical drama film directed and co-written by Anne Fontaine. The film stars Audrey Tautou and details the early life of French fashion designer Coco Chanel.

The film premiered in Paris on 6 April 2009 and was released in France and Belgium on 22 April 2009. As of 21 December that year, it had grossed $43,832,376 worldwide. The production budget was $23 million.

Instead of releasing Coco Before Chanel in the United States itself, Warner Bros. Pictures let Sony Pictures Classics handle the release there. The film grossed $6 million in the United States.

Coco Before Chanel was nominated for four BAFTA Awards, three European Film Awards, six César Awards and the Oscar for Best Costume Design.

== Plot ==
The film opens showing Gabrielle Chanel and her sister Adrienne being abandoned by their father at an orphanage in Aubazine in 1893. Gabrielle waits every Sunday for their father to visit them, but he never shows up. We learned later from Gabrielle's own reminiscing that her parents' marriage made her mother extremely unhappy, and that the father abandoned the two little girls after their mother's death. It also emerges that shortly after abandoning the two little girls their father left France to try his fortune in America.

15 years down the line in 1908, we find a young Gabrielle Chanel working in a provincial bar. She works as a seamstress for the performers by day and as a cabaret singer by night, singing and dancing with Adrienne a song about a little dog named "Coco" that gets lost at the Trocadéro in Paris. Gabrielle and Adrienne resist being confused with the hookers whose services are purchased by the male customers of the bar, but they both get the seductive attentions of two older rich men, a baron for Adrienne, and another aristocrat named Balsan for Gabrielle. "Coco" becomes Gabrielle's nickname. Adrienne becomes the de facto wife of the baron, who however never marries her, due to his family opposition.

Deprived of opportunities and driven by an inner drive to make it at all costs, Gabrielle resolves to leave the provincial city and reach Balsan's country estate. Here she accepts to have a liaison with Balsan, while still trying to assert her independence. She learns to ride horses and this experience gives her the idea of designing trousers for women. She meets actress Emilienne, in the circle of Balsan's friends, and she begins designing hats and dresses for her, as well as for herself. She starts reinventing women's dresses by dropping corsets and excessive decorations and shortening skirts.

Balsan's circle of friends includes a self-made, rich, English businessman, named Arthur Capel, significantly younger than Balsan. Capel courts Gabrielle-Coco until the two fall in love during an escapade at the seaside in Normandy. Balsan is upset at the prospect of losing Coco to a man whom he has himself introduced to her, and he offers to marry Gabrielle to win her back from Capel, but Gabrielle refuses. In revenge, Balsan reveals to Gabrielle that Capel is betrothed to a woman in England. Coco decides to continue the liaison with Capel, but with no more illusions about marriage, declaring that she will never get married.

Capel believes in Coco's talent making hats and dresses and tells her "There's no one else like you". Coco continues developing independently her own new vision of how a modern woman should be dressed, in a style that conveys freedom and self-determination, rather than being a man's toy. When she learns that the bank is lending her money for her new business in Paris only thanks to guarantees offered by Capel, she shows aversion, and she insists on dealing with the bank by herself, understanding that her independence and her success will not be for real if she depends on a man. Suddenly, Capel dies in a car accident. Coco is emotionally devastated, but rationally determined to continue asserting herself, her independence, her unique style.

The movie ends showing Coco dressed in one of her hallmark tailleurs, sitting on a stair, and watching a series of beautiful models wearing Coco Chanel's dresses from various decades of fashion making. The movie only shows the beginning of her career, hence the title "Coco avant Chanel," summarizing her future success and ascent in the stardom of fashion only in this final sequence.

== Cast ==
- Audrey Tautou as Coco Chanel
- Benoît Poelvoorde as Étienne Balsan
- Alessandro Nivola as Arthur Capel
- Marie Gillain as Adrienne Chanel
- Emmanuelle Devos as Émilienne d'Alençon
- Émilie Gavois-Kahn as The alternate seamstress

== Reception ==
=== Critical response ===
Roger Ebert praised the film for its unsentimental approach to Chanel's early years. English critic Philip French found the film handsomely designed, tasteful, and reserved, but rather dull.

Coco Before Chanel has an approval rating of 64% on Rotten Tomatoes, based on 136 reviews, and an average rating of 6/10. The website's critical consensus states, "Though it doesn't quite capture the complexity of its subject's life, Coco Avant Chanel remains a fascinating, appropriately lovely tribute". Metacritic assigned the film a weighted average score of 65 out of 100, based on 30 critics, indicating "generally favorable reviews".

=== Accolades ===
Date of ceremony	Award	Category	Recipients	Result
17 October 2009	World Soundtrack Awards	Film Composer of the Year	Alexandre Desplat	Won
12 December 2009	European Film Awards	Prix d'Excellence	Catherine Leterrier (costume design)	Nominated
12 December 2009	European Film Awards	Best Composer	Alexandre Desplat	Nominated
12 December 2009	European Film Awards	People's Choice Award for Best European Film	Coco Before Chanel	Nominated
21 December 2009	St. Louis Gateway Film Critics Association Awards	Best Foreign Language Film	Coco Before Chanel	Nominated
15 January 2010	Critics' Choice Movie Award	Best Foreign Language Film	Coco Before Chanel	Nominated
15 February 2010	Étoiles D'or du Cinéma Français	Best Film Composer	Alexandre Desplat	Won
20 February 2010	Golden Reel Awards	Best Sound Editing in a Feature Foreign Language Film	Jean-Claude Laureux; Franck Desmoulins; Anne Gibourg; Sylvain Malbrant; Claire-Anne Largeron; Pascal Chauvin	Nominated
21 February 2010	British Academy Film Awards	Best Film Not in the English Language	Coco Before Chanel	Nominated
21 February 2010	British Academy Film Awards	Best Actress in a Leading Role	Audrey Tautou	Nominated
21 February 2010	British Academy Film Awards	Best Costume Design	Catherine Leterrier	Nominated
21 February 2010	British Academy Film Awards	Best Makeup and Hair	Thi Thanh Tu Nguyen; Madeleine Cofano; Jane Milon	Nominated
25 February 2010	Costume Designers Guild Awards	Excellence in Period Film	Catherine Leterrier	Nominated
27 February 2010	César Awards	Best Actress	Audrey Tautou	Nominated
27 February 2010	César Awards	Best Actor in a Supporting Role	Benoît Poelvoorde	Nominated
27 February 2010	César Awards	Best Adaptation	Anne Fontaine; Camille Fontaine	Nominated
27 February 2010	César Awards	Best Cinematography	Christophe Beaucarne	Nominated
27 February 2010	César Awards	Best Costumes	Catherine Leterrier	Won
27 February 2010	César Awards	Best Set Design	Olivier Radot	Nominated
7 March 2010	Academy Awards	Best Costume Design	Catherine Leterrier	Nominated
5 February 2011	Magritte Awards	Best Supporting Actor	Benoît Poelvoorde	Nominated
