= Jean Francois Empain =

Belgian entrepreneur

- Born: 5 June 1964 (age 62); Boulogne-Billancourt, France
- Occupation: Internet entrepreneur
- Known for: Helvetic Clinics.
- Title: Baron Empain
- Spouse(s): Veronique Rousselin (1990–2000); Anne Simond (2018)
- Children: Philippine and Morgane
- Parent(s): Édouard-Jean Empain, Silvana Betuzzi

Jean Francois Empain, 4th Baron Empain (born 5 June 1964, Boulogne-Billancourt) is a Belgian entrepreneur and the last living Baron Empain after his father's death in June 2018.

== Personal life ==
Jean Francois Empain was born to Édouard-Jean Empain and his first wife, Silvana Betuzzi. His parents were divorced shortly after his father's kidnapping, in 1978.

Jean Francois remained married to Veronique Rousselin from 1990 to 2000. He married Anne Simond in March 2019. Jean has two daughters; Philippine and Morgane.

== Career ==
In 1988, Jean Francois Empain started his career in Paris, working for Bacot Alain Warburg (now UBS) as a stock broker. In 1991, he set up a successful Commodity Trading Advisor (CTA) in Europe with Pierre Chaker.

Jean François Empain became an early player in the online industry in France. He founded NetBourse, a French online brokerage firm in 1995 that entered into an agreement with Etrade US. In 1999, Etrade (US) bought back their shares in Etrade-Netbourse.

Jean Francois moved to Switzerland in 2002 and became an E-Commerce investor in several ventures before Co-founding Helvetic Dental Clinics, a Switzerland-based company that owns dental clinics of the same name in Hungary, Switzerland, France and Luxembourg.

Belgian nobility
Preceded by Édouard-Jean, 3rd Baron Empain	Baron Empain; 2018–present	Succeeded by Incumbent
