= Anne Consigny =

French actress

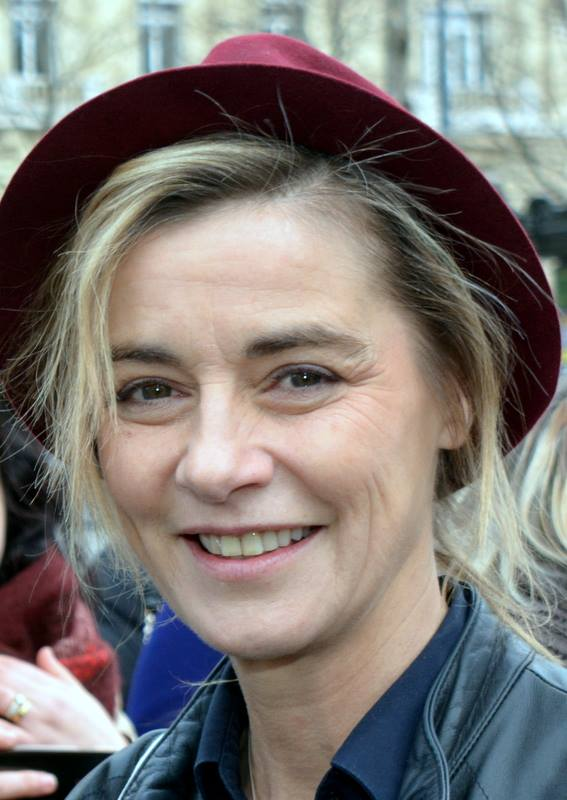
- Consigny in 2017
- Born: 25 May 1963 (age 63); Alençon, Orne, France
- Occupation: Actress
- Years active: 1981–present
- Spouse: Éric de Chassey (m. 2013)
- Children: 2

Anne Consigny (French pronunciation: [an kɔ̃siɲi]; born 25 May 1963) is a French actress who has been active since 1981. She received a César Award nomination for Best Actress for her role in the film Not Here to Be Loved (2005). She is also known for her role as Claude in the 2007 drama The Diving Bell and the Butterfly and as Elizabeth in the 2008 film A Christmas Tale, for which she was nominated for the César Award for Best Supporting Actress.

== Personal life ==
She is the daughter of Pierre Consigny, who was the head of cabinet for the Prime Minister Maurice Couve de Murville. She has five siblings. One of her brothers is the writer and publicist Thierry Consigny, author of La Mort de Lara.

She has two sons with French film director and former partner Benoît Jacquot; Vladimir Consigny, an actor born in 1988, and Louis, born in 1994. She is married to art critic Éric de Chassey.

== Filmography ==
Year	Title	Role	Notes
1981	Yume, yume no ato	Yuki	
1981	Ursule Mirouët	Ursule Mirouët	Telefilm
1982	La Cerisaie	Ania	Telefilm
1983	Bel-Ami	Suzanne	TV series
1984	Allô Béatrice	Agnès	TV series
1985	The Satin Slipper	Marie des Sept-Épées	
1986	L'Ami Maupassant	Berthe	TV series
1986	La Chambre des dames	Agnès	TV series
1988	La Belle Anglaise	Michelle	TV series
1988	Alice		
1995	La Place Royale	Angélique	Telefilm
2002	Une famille formidable	Éléonore	TV series
2003	Playing 'In the Company of Men'	Thérèse Jurrieu	
2003	Le Bison	Attorney	
2003	Hôtel des deux mondes	Laura	Telefilm
2004	36 Quai des Orfèvres	Hélène Klein	
2004	The Light	Camille	
2005	Not Here to Be Loved	Françoise	Nominated—César Award for Best Actress
2006	Aller simple	Carole	Telefilm
2006	On va s'aimer	Mathilde	
2006	Du jour au lendemain	Caroline	
2006	L'État de Grace	Grace Bellanger	
2007	The Diving Bell and the Butterfly	Claude	
2007	Anna M.	Marie Zanevsky	
2008	Béthune sur le Nil	Lucette Vaillant	TV series
2008	Largo Winch	Hannah	
2008	Mesrine	Mesrine's lawyer	
2008	A Christmas Tale	Elizabeth Dédalus	Nominated—César Award for Best Supporting Actress
2008	The Great Alibi	Claire Collier	
2008	Coupable	Blanche	
2008	Les Vœux (Histoire de Colbrune et Bjorn)		Short film
2009	Rapt	Françoise Graff	Nominated—César Award for Best Supporting Actress
2009	One for the Road	Agnès	
2009	Bambou	Anne Chevalier	
2009	Angel at Sea	Mother	
2009	Wild Grass	Suzanne	
2009	La Première Étoile	Suzy	
2009	John Rabe	Valérie Dupres	
2011	E-Love	Paule Zachmann	Telefilm
2011	Les Beaux Mecs	Claire	TV series
2011	De force	Danielle Canetti	
2012-2015	Les Revenants	Claire Séguret	TV series
2012	You Ain't Seen Nothin' Yet	Eurydice #2	
2012	What the Day Owes the Night	Madeleine	
2013	Sous le figuier	Nathalie	
2013	Swim Little Fish Swim	Françoise de Castillon	
2013	12 ans d'âge	Dany	
2014	96 hours	Françoise Carré	
2014	Three Hearts	The cardiologist	Uncredited
2016	History's Future	Caroline	
2016	Diabolique	Isabelle de Lassay	Telefilm
2016	7 Minutes	Madame Rochette	
2016	Elle	Anna	Nominated—César Award for Best Supporting Actress
2018	At Eternity's Gate	Teacher	
2018, 2021	Hippocrate	Muriel Wagner	TV series (16 episodes)
2020	Trigonometry	Mathilde	TV series
2024	La Maison	Marie Ledu	TV series
