= Welcome (2009 film) =

- Theatrical release poster
- Directed by: Philippe Lioret
- Written by: Philippe Lioret; Emmanuel Courcol; Olivier Adam
- Produced by: Christophe Rossignon
- Starring: Vincent Lindon; Firat Ayverdi; Audrey Dana; Olivier Rabourdin; Derya Ayverdi
- Cinematography: Laurent Dailland
- Edited by: Andréa Sedlackova
- Music by: Nicola Piovani; Wojciech Kilar; Armand Amar
- Production companies: Nord-Ouest Productions; Studio 37; France 3 Cinéma; Mars Films; Fin Août Productions
- Distributed by: Mars Distribution
- Release dates: 7 February 2009 (Berlinale); 11 March 2009 (France)
- Running time: 110 minutes
- Country: France
- Languages: French; English; Kurdish; Turkish
- Budget: $10 million
- Box office: $13.6 million

Welcome is a 2009 French film directed by Philippe Lioret. It stars Vincent Lindon and features Firat Ayverdi and Derya Ayverdi in their inaugural roles. The film was released on 11 March 2009 in France. The director wanted to highlight the plight of immigrants living in Calais, France, and their plans to reach the United Kingdom.

== Plot ==
The film tells the story of Simon Calmat (Vincent Lindon), a French swimming coach who is divorcing his wife Marion (Audrey Dana). Simon tries to help a young Iraqi-Kurd immigrant, Bilal Kayani (Firat Ayverdi), whose dream is to cross the English Channel from Calais in France to the United Kingdom by any means possible to be reunited with his girlfriend Mina (Derya Ayverdi). Meanwhile, Mina's father strongly opposes Bilal's plans as he wants to marry his daughter to her cousin who owns a restaurant. After being caught with other immigrants and returned to France, Simon gives him temporary refuge at his home after the young Bilal, nicknamed "Bazda" (runner, for his athletic abilities and love of football and Manchester United in particular) registers for swimming lessons, intending to train to be able to swim across the Channel. After police search Simon's apartment, Bilal goes on a final attempt and drowns 800 meters from the English coast while hiding from the coastguard. Simon then travels to inform Mina.

== Cast ==
- Vincent Lindon as Simon Calmat
- Firat Ayverdi as Bilal Kayani, "Bazda", 17-year-old Iraqi-Kurd immigrant
- Audrey Dana as Marion, Simon's wife
- Olivier Rabourdin as Police lieutenant
- Derya Ayverdi as Mîna, girlfriend of Bilal
- Yannick Renier as Simon's colleague at the swimming pool
- Thierry Godard as Bruno, immigration activist and friend of Marion at the volunteers
- Fırat Çelik as Koban, a furious Turkish immigrant pursuing Bilal for a debt
- Jean-Paul Comart as The rank
- Mouafaq Rushdie as Mîna's father
- Behi Djanati Atai as Mîna's mother
- Patrick Ligardes as Hostile neighbor
- Jean-Paul Brissart as Immigration judge
- Éric Hérson-Macarel as Police officer at the detention center
- Emmanuel Courcol as Manager at the supermarket
- Jean-François Fagour as Security personnel at the supermarket
- Jean-Christophe Voiron as Czech truck driver

== Reception ==
The film became popular with audiences in France alone reaching 780,000 in just 3 weeks on screen. The debate about immigration intensified after French Immigration Minister Éric Besson and film director Philippe Lioret debated the issue during the popular French television discussion show Ce soir (ou jamais !). Lioret took the opportunity to ask for an amendment to French law depenalising those who help refugees. "If such a thing passes on [amending] this article, it will be a victory", he declared.

The French member of parliament Daniel Goldberg introduced a proposition to decriminalize the aiding of unauthorised immigration (l'immigration clandestine). The proposition was hotly debated. The amendment was discussed but did not become law. Goldberg said he intended to introduce further measures to amend the law. Another proposition was tabled by a group of Communist senators, but never discussed.

On review aggregator website Rotten Tomatoes, the film holds an approval rating of 87% based on 30 reviews, with an average rating of 6.9/10.

== Accolades ==
On 25 November 2009, the film won the Lux Prize from the European Parliament.

Other awards:

- 2009: Won "Label Europa Cinemas" and "Prize of the Ecumenical Jury" at the Berlin International Film Festival
- 2009: Won "Best Screenplay" and "Special Prize of the Young Jury" at the Gijón International Film Festival
- 2009: Won Grand Prize for Dramatic Feature at the Heartland Film Festival
- 2009: Won the Audience Award at the Warsaw International Film Festival
- 2010: Won Lumière Award for Best Film at the 15th Lumière Awards
- 2010: Won Prix Jacques Prévert du Scénario for Best Original Screenplay

== See also ==
- Kurdish cinema
