= Philippe Lioret =

French film director, screenwriter and producer (born 1955)

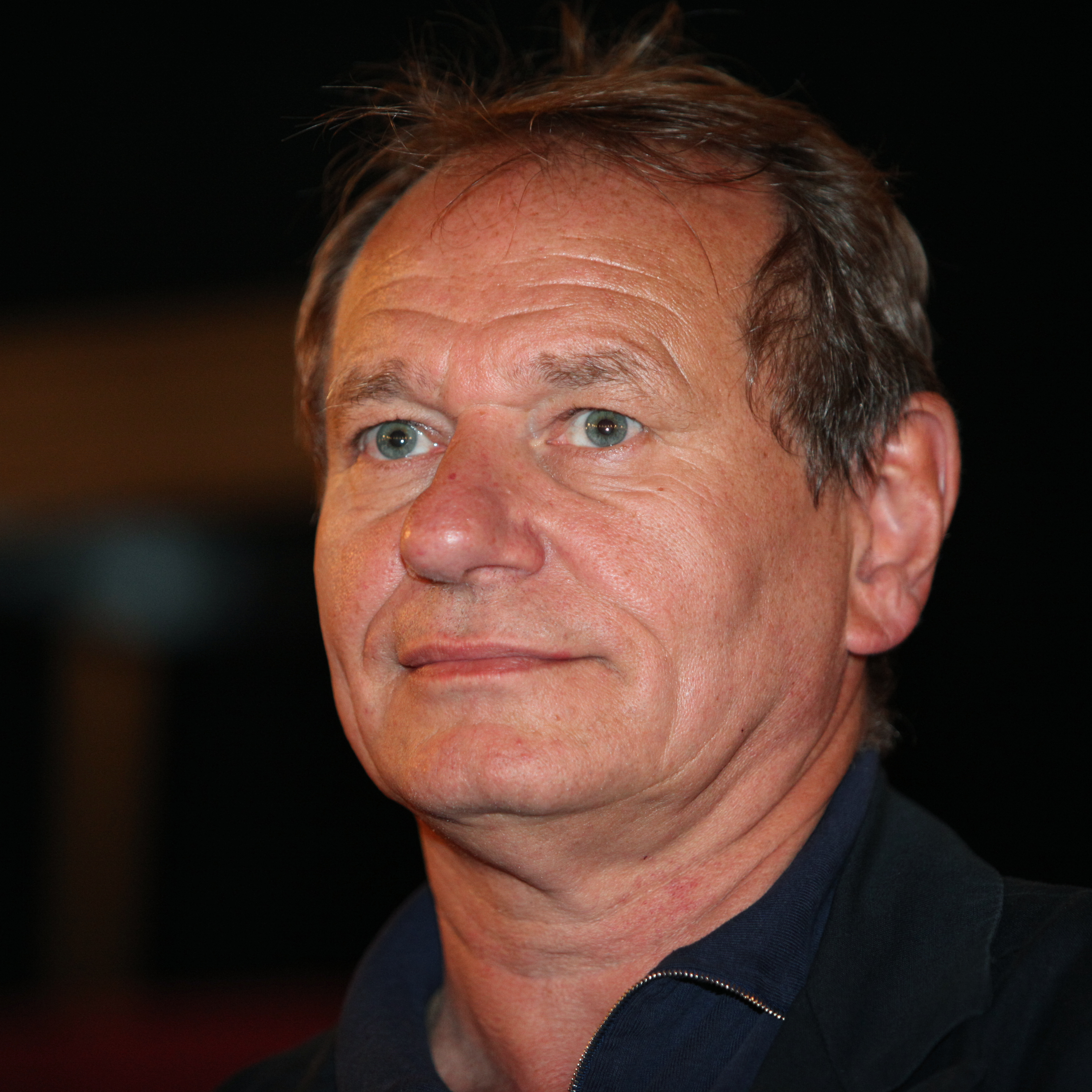
- Philippe Lioret at 2009 KVIFF
- Born: 10 October 1955 (age 71); Paris, France
- Occupations: Film director, screenwriter, producer
- Years active: 1982—present

Philippe Lioret (born 10 October 1955) is a French film director, screenwriter and producer.

== Filmography ==
Film

Year	Title	Director	Writer	Producer	Notes
1993	Lost in Transit	Yes	No	No	
1997	Proper Attire Required	Yes	Yes	No	
2001	Mademoiselle	Yes	Yes	No	
2004	The Light	Yes	Yes	No	
2006	Don't Worry, I'm Fine	Yes	Yes	No	
2009	Welcome	Yes	Yes	No	Also actor
2011	All Our Desires	Yes	Yes	Yes	
2015	French Blood	No	No	Yes	
2016	Le Fils de Jean	Yes	Yes	Yes	

Short film

Year	Title	Director	Writer	Notes
1994	La Sirène	Yes	No	Segment of 3000 scénarios contre un virus
2001	Pas d'histoire	Yes	Yes	Segment of Don't Make Trouble!
2005	Tue l'amour	Yes	Yes	
2005	Vache-qui-rit	Yes	Yes	

== Awards and nominations ==
Year	Title	Awards/Nominations
1993	Lost in Transit	San Sebastián International Film Festival – Silver Shell for Best Director; Yubari International Fantastic Film Festival – Grand Prize
2001	Mademoiselle	Nominated—Moscow Film Festival – Golden St. George
2006	Don't Worry, I'm Fine	Nominated—César Award for Best Film; Nominated—César Award for Best Director; Nominated—César Award for Best Adaptation
2009	Welcome	Berlin Film Festival – Prize of the Ecumenical Jury (Panorama); Berlin Film Festival – Europa Cinemas Label; Durban International Film Festival – Best Direction; Gijón International Film Festival – Best Screenplay; Gijón International Film Festival – Special Prize of the Young Jury; Heartland Film Festival – Grand Prize for Dramatic Feature; Lumière Award for Best Film; Lux Prize; Prix Jacques Prévert du Scénario for Best Original Screenplay; Sofia International Film Festival – Burgas Municipality Award; Torino Film Festival – Maurizio Collino Award; Unabhängiges Filmfest Osnabrück – Peace Film Award; Warsaw International Film Festival – Audience Award; Nominated—César Award for Best Film; Nominated—César Award for Best Director; Nominated—César Award for Best Original Screenplay; Nominated—David di Donatello for Best European Film; Nominated—Globes de Cristal Award for Best Film; Nominated—Lumière Award for Best Director; Nominated—Lumière Award for Best Screenplay
2011	All Our Desires	Nominated—Venice Film Festival - Venice Days Award
