= List of French films of 2009 =

A list of French produced or co-produced films released in France in 2009:

Title	Director	Cast	Genre	Release date
13ème Mois	Lewis-Martin Soucy	Jean-Pierre Martins, Maria Flor, Jean-Christophe Bouvet, Khalid Maadour	Comedy	May 25
1943 Le temps d'un répit (A Pause during the Holocaust)	André Waksman		Documentary	in Paris on 4 December
36 vues du Pic Saint-Loup	Jacques Rivette	Julie-Marie Parmentier, Jacques Bonnaffé, André Marcon		September 16
À l'origine	Xavier Giannoli	François Cluzet, Emmanuelle Devos	Drama	20 May at Cannes
Adieu Gary Cooper	Nassim Amaouche	Bernard Blancan, Mohamed Mahmoud Ould Mohamed	Drama	July 22
Ah! La libido	Michèle Rosier	Audrey Dana, Sarah Grappin, Anna Mihalcea, Claude Degliame	Comedy, Romance	February
L' Armée du crime	Robert Guédiguian	Virginie Ledoyen, Simon Abkarian, Robinson Stévenin, Jean-Pierre Darroussin, Lola Naymark, Ariane Ascaride, Grégoire Leprince-Ringuet, Yann Trégouët, Ivan Franěk, Olga Legrand,	Drama, History, War	September 23
Arthur and the Revenge of Maltazard	Luc Besson	Freddie Highmore, Mia Farrow, Robert Stanton, Madonna, Snoop Dogg, Jimmy Fallon, Emilio Estevez, Robert De Niro, Chazz Palminteri, Anthony Anderson, Jason Bateman, David Bowie	Adventure, Family, Fantasy	December 9
Bellamy	Claude Chabrol	Gérard Depardieu, Vahina Giocante, Clovis Cornillac, Marie Bunel, Jacques Gamblin, Marie Matherson, Adrienne Pauly	Crime	February 25
Bluebeard	Catherine Breillat	Dominique Thomas, Lola Créton, Daphné Baiwir	Crime	
Celle que j'aime	Élie Chouraqui	Marc Lavoine, Gérard Darmon, Barbara Schulz	Comedy	April 22
Cendres et sang	Fanny Ardant	Zoltan Butuc		May
Cineman	Yann Moix	Franck Dubosc, Jean-Christophe Bouvet	Comedy	April 29
Le Code a changé	Danièle Thompson	Emmanuelle Seigner, Dany Boon, Karin Viard, Marina Hands, Patrick Bruel	Comedy	
Don't Look Back	Marina de Van	Sophie Marceau, Monica Bellucci	Thriller	May at Cannes
Enter the Void	Gaspar Noé	Nathaniel Brown	Drama	13 May at Cannes
Father of My Children	Mia Hansen-Løve	Louis-Do de Lencquesaing	Drama	May at Cannes
The Good Heart	Dagur Kári	Brian Cox, Paul Dano	Drama-Comedy	March 17
Hadewijch	Bruno Dumont	Julie Sokolowski, Karl Sarafidis	Drama	September 11
A Happy Man (Le Bonheur de Pierre)	Robert Ménard	Pierre Richard, Sylvie Testud, Rémy Girard, Louise Portal, Patrick Drolet, Jean-Nicolas Verreault, Luc Proulx, Gaston Lepage, André Lacoste, Vincent Bilodeau, Sylvie Lemay, Philippe Agède	Comedy	March 6
Les Herbes folles	Alain Resnais	Sabine Azéma, André Dussollier		13 May at Cannes
La Horde	Yannick Dahan	Claude Perron, John-Pierre Martins	Horror	September 17
I Love You Phillip Morris	John Requa, Glenn Ficarra	Jim Carrey, Ewan McGregor, Rodrigo Santoro, Leslie Mann	Romantic comedy-drama	
The Imaginarium of Doctor Parnassus	Terry Gilliam	Heath Ledger, Jude Law	Fantasy	
Irene	Alain Cavalier		Drama	May at Cannes
Kinatay	Brillante Mendoza	Coco Martin, Maria Isabel Lopez, Julio Diaz, John Regala	Crime, Drama, Horror, Thriller	17 May at Cannes, 23 September 2009 (Philippines) & 18 November 2009 (France)
Lola	Brillante Mendoza	Anita Linda, Rustica Carpio	Drama	
Looking for Eric	Ken Loach	Eric Cantona	Drama/Comedy/Biographical	June
Micmacs	Jean-Pierre Jeunet	Dany Boon, Dominique Pinon, André Dussollier, Jean-Pierre Marielle, Julie Ferrier, Yolande Moreau	Comedy, Crime, Adventure	15 September 2009
Mr. Nobody	Jaco Van Dormael	Sarah Polley, Jared Leto, Diane Kruger, Rhys Ifans	Science fiction film	January
OSS 117: Lost in Rio	Michel Hazanavicius	Jean Dujardin	Comedy	15 April 2009
A Prophet	Jacques Audiard	Tahar Rahim, Niels Arestrup	Crime drama	May at Cannes
The Soloist	Joe Wright	Jamie Foxx, Robert Downey Jr., Catherine Keener, Tom Hollander, LisaGay Hamilton	Drama	
Tomorrow at Dawn	Denis Dercourt	Gérald Laroche, Françoise Lebrun	Drama	May at Cannes
A Town Called Panic	Vincent Patar, Stéphane Aubier		Animation-Comedy	October 28
Triage	Danis Tanovic	Colin Ferrell, Paz Vega, Christopher Lee	Drama-War	June 16
Ultimatum	Alain Tasma	Gaspard Ulliel, Jasmine Trinca	Drama	30 September 2009
Welcome	Philippe Lioret	Vincent Lindon	Drama	March 11
White Material	Claire Denis	Isabelle Huppert	Drama	6 September 2009
