= Agat Films & Cie – Ex Nihilo =

Agat Films & Cie
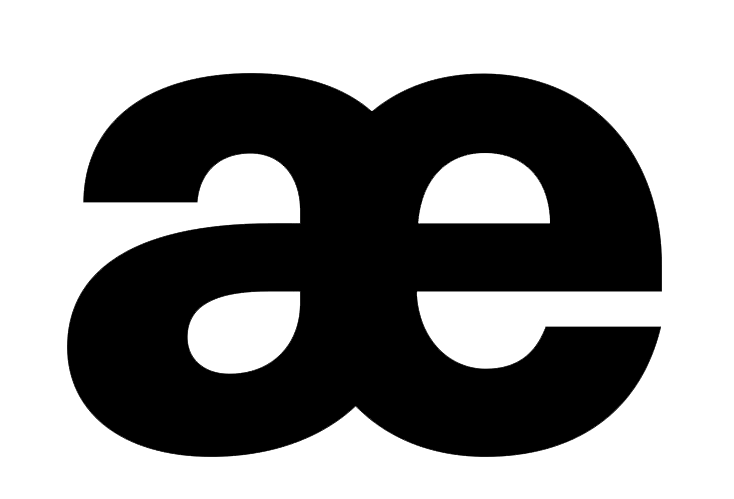
- Industry: Motion pictures
- Founded: 23 July 1986; 39 years ago
- Headquarters: Paris, France
- Products: Film production, film distribution
- Revenue: €5.2 million
- Number of employees: 200–249
- Website: Official website

Agat Films & Cie – Ex Nihilo is a French production company and film distributor.

The company groups the following eight producers: Robert Guédiguian, Blanche Guichou, Marie Balducchi, Nicolas Blanc, Marc Bordure, Arnaud Colinart, David Coujard, Muriel Meynard, and Patrick Sobelman. The company is chaired alternately by each of the eight partners.

== Selected filmography ==
=== Films ===
- 1995: The Age of Potential by Pascale Ferran
- 1997: Marius and Jeannette by Robert Guédiguian
- 1999: Venus Beauty Institute by Tonie Marshall
- 1999: The Little Thief by Erick Zonca
- 1999: Cold Lands by Sébastien Lifshitz
- 2000: Tontaine et Tonton by Tonie Marshall
- 2000: Save Me by Christian Vincent
- 2001: Roberto Succo by Cédric Kahn
- 2002: Marie-Jo and Her Two Lovers by Robert Guédiguian
- 2002: My Life on Ice by Olivier Ducastel and Jacques Martineau
- 2003: Stormy Weather by Sólveig Anspach
- 2004: Bad Spelling by Jean-Jacques Zilbermann
- 2004: Innocence by Lucile Hadžihalilović
- 2005: Cockles and Muscles by Olivier Ducastel and Jacques Martineau
- 2005: The Last Mitterrand by Robert Guédiguian
- 2005: Free Zone by Amos Gitai
- 2006: Armenia by Robert Guédiguian
- 2007: Disengagement by Amos Gitai
- 2008: Lady Jane by Robert Guédiguian
- 2009: The Army of Crime by Robert Guédiguian
- 2011: The Snows of Kilimanjaro by Robert Guédiguian
- 2014: Ariane's Thread by Robert Guédiguian
- 2015: Don't Tell Me the Boy Was Mad by Robert Guédiguian
- 2016: Jamais contente by Émilie Deleuze
- 2017: Gaspard at the Wedding by Antony Cordier
- 2019: Bro by Julien Abraham

=== TV series ===
- 2005: Venus and Apollo
- 2016: Tu mourras moins bête
- 2013: La langue secrète des marionnettes

=== Video games ===
- 2013: Type:Rider
