= 23rd César Awards =

1998 French cinema awards ceremony

- Date: 28 February 1998
- Site: Théâtre des Champs-Élysées, Paris, France
- Hosted by: Antoine de Caunes

Highlights
- Best Film: Same Old Song
- Best Actor: André Dussollier; Same Old Song
- Best Actress: Ariane Ascaride; Marius and Jeannette

Television coverage
- Network: Canal+

The 23rd César Awards ceremony, presented by the Académie des Arts et Techniques du Cinéma, honoured the best French films of 1997 and took place on 28 February 1998 at the Théâtre des Champs-Élysées in Paris. The ceremony was chaired by Juliette Binoche and hosted by Antoine de Caunes. Same Old Song won the award for Best Film.

== Winners and nominees ==
The winners are highlighted in bold:

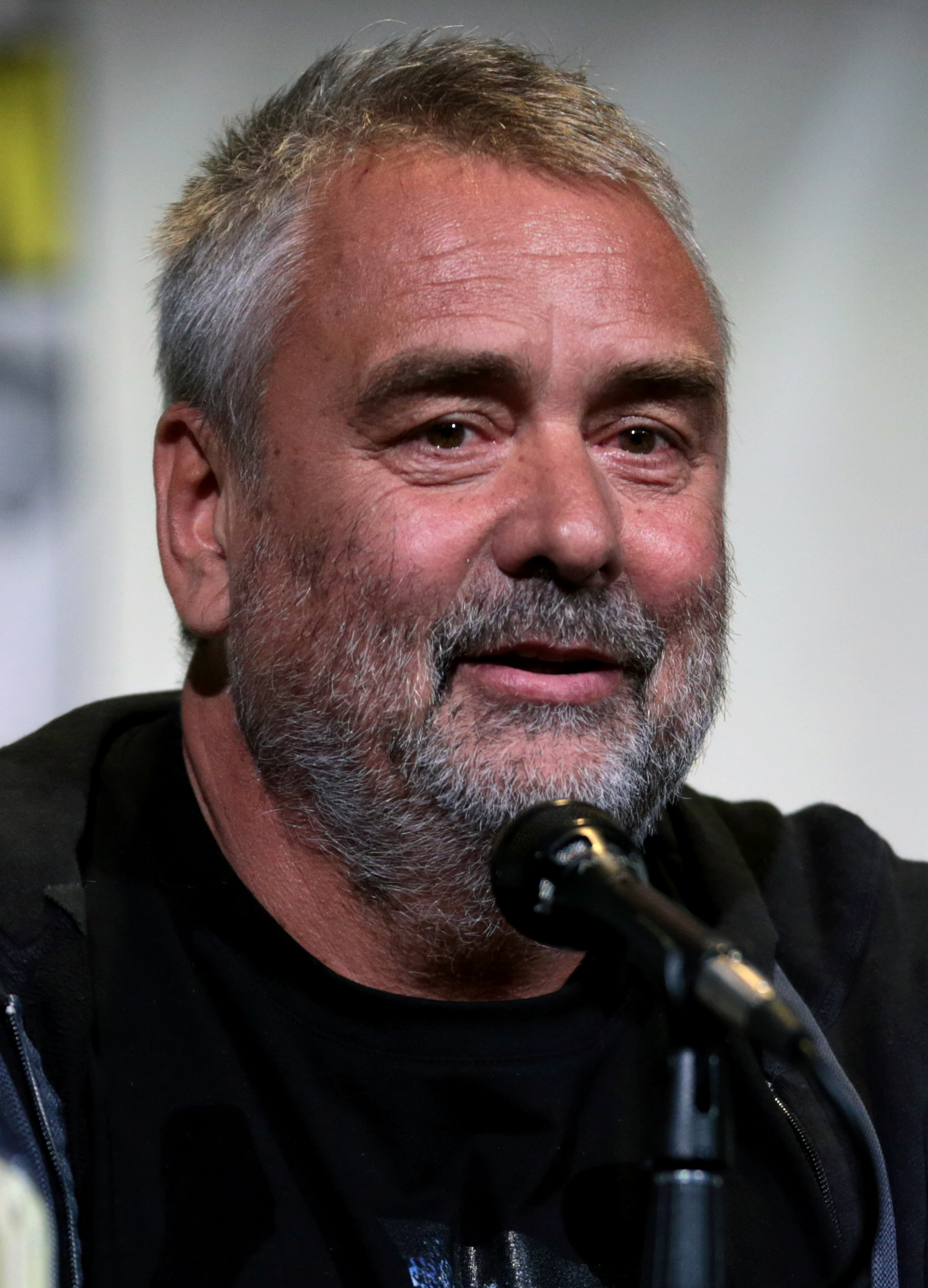
Luc Besson, Best Director winner

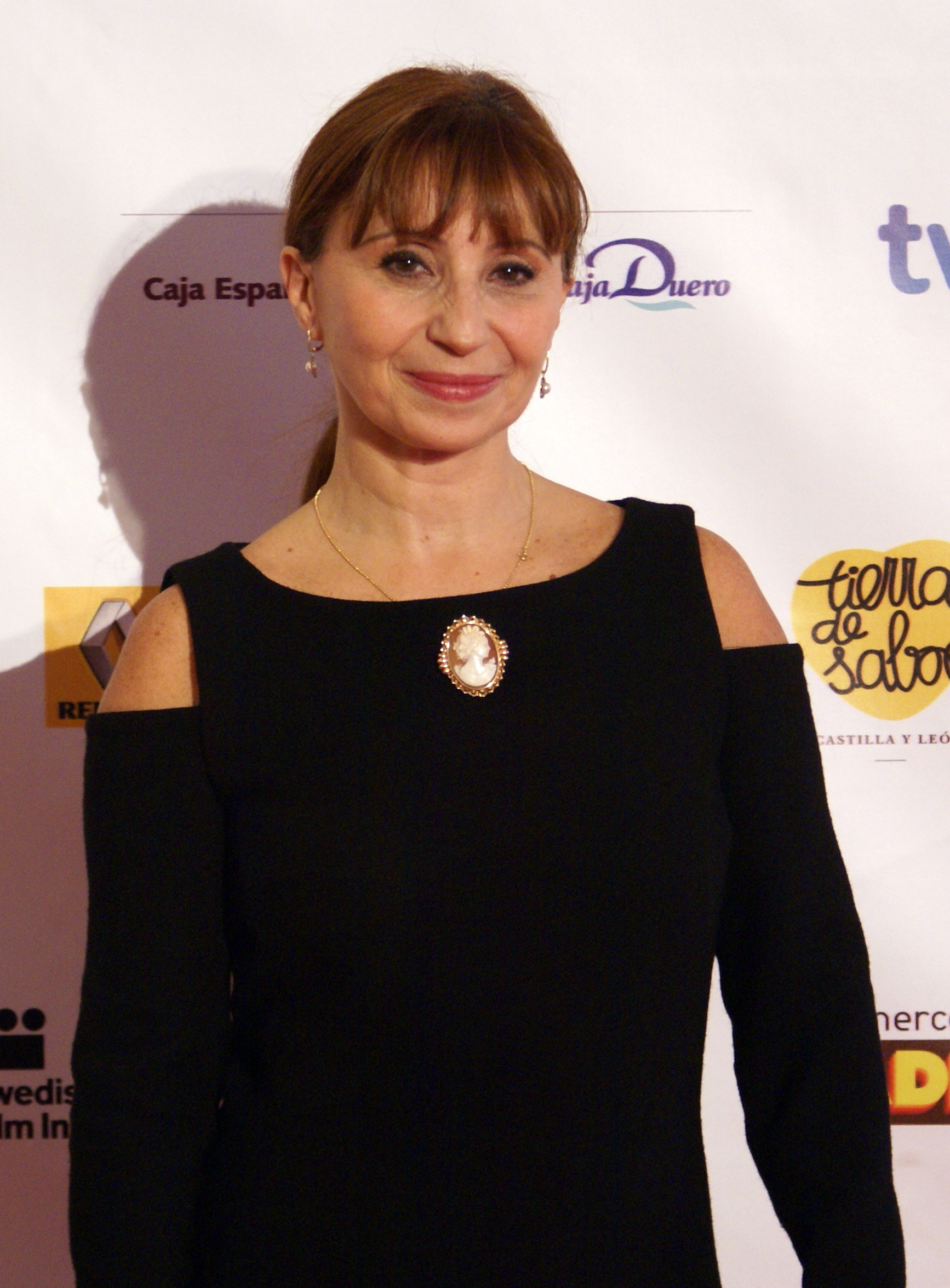
Ariane Ascaride, Best Actress winner

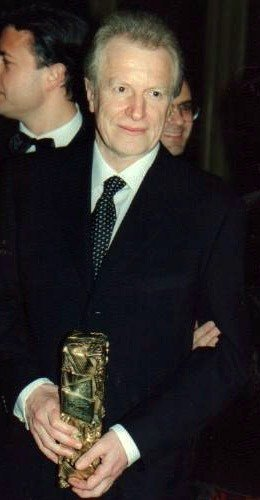
André Dussollier, Best Actor winner

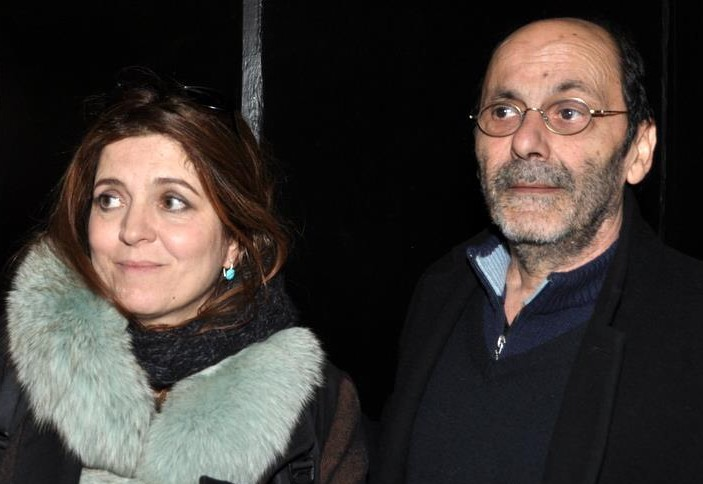
Agnès Jaoui and Jean-Pierre Bacri, Best Supporting Actress, Best Supporting Actor and Best Original Screenplay or Adaptation winners

| **Best Film** **Same Old Song**: On Guard; The Fifth Element; Marius and Jeannette; Western | **Best Director** **Luc Besson – The Fifth Element**: Alain Corneau – Le Cousin; Robert Guédiguian – Marius and Jeannette; Alain Resnais – Same Old Song; Manuel Poirier – Western |
| **Best Actor** **André Dussollier – Same Old Song**: Daniel Auteuil – On Guard; Charles Berling – Dry Cleaning; Alain Chabat – Didier; Patrick Timsit – Le Cousin | **Best Actress** **Ariane Ascaride – Marius and Jeannette**: Sabine Azéma – Same Old Song; Marie Gillain – On Guard; Sandrine Kiberlain – Seventh Heaven; Miou-Miou – Dry Cleaning |
| **Best Supporting Actor** **Jean-Pierre Bacri – Same Old Song**: Jean-Pierre Darroussin – Marius and Jeannette; Gérard Jugnot – Marthe; Vincent Pérez – On Guard; Lambert Wilson – Same Old Song | **Best Supporting Actress** **Agnès Jaoui – Same Old Song**: Pascale Roberts – Marius and Jeannette; Mathilde Seigner – Dry Cleaning; Marie Trintignant – Le Cousin; Karin Viard – Hikers |
| **Most Promising Actor** **Stanislas Merhar – Dry Cleaning**: Sacha Bourdo – Western; Vincent Elbaz – Hikers; José Garcia – La Vérité si je mens !; Sergi López – Western | **Most Promising Actress** **Emma de Caunes – Un frère**: Jeanne Balibar – I Hate Love; Isabelle Carré – The Banned Woman; Amira Casar – La Vérité si je mens !; Laetitia Pesenti – Marius and Jeannette |
| **Best Original Screenplay or Adaptation** **Same Old Song** – **Agnès Jaoui and Jean-Pierre Bacri**: Le Cousin – Michel Alexandre and Alain Corneau; Marius and Jeannette – Robert Guédiguian and Jean-Louis Milesi; Dry Cleaning – Anne Fontaine and Gilles Taurand; Western – Jean-François Goyet and Manuel Poirier | **Best First Feature Film** **Didier**: The Other Shore; Les Démons de Jésus; La Vie de Jésus; Ma vie en rose |
| **Best Cinematography** **Thierry Arbogast – The Fifth Element**: Benoît Delhomme – Artemisia; Jean-François Robin – On Guard | **Best Editing** **Hervé de Luze – Same Old Song**: Henri Lanoë – On Guard; Sylvie Landra – The Fifth Element |
| **Best Sound** **Jean-Pierre Laforce, Michel Klochendler and Pierre Lenoir – Same Old Song**: Daniel Brisseau – The Fifth Element; Pierre Gamet and Gérard Lamps – Le Cousin | **Best Original Music** **Bernardo Sandoval – Western**: Philippe Sarde – On Guard; Éric Serra – The Fifth Element; Jordi Savall – Marquise; Bruno Fontaine – Same Old Song |
| **Best Costume Design** **Christian Gasc – On Guard**: Dominique Borg – Artemisia; Jean-Paul Gaultier – The Fifth Element | **Best Production Design** **Dan Weil – The Fifth Element**: Bernard Vezat – On Guard; Jacques Saulnier – Same Old Song |
| **Best Short Film** **Majorettes in Space (Des majorettes dans l'espace)**: Ferrailles; Seule; Tout doit disparaître; The Old Lady and the Pigeons | **Best Foreign Film** **Brassed Off**: The English Patient; Everyone Says I Love You; The Full Monty; Hana-bi |
**Honorary César** **Michael Douglas**; **Clint Eastwood**; **Jean-Luc Godard**

== See also ==
- 70th Academy Awards
- 51st British Academy Film Awards
- 10th European Film Awards
- 3rd Lumière Awards
