= Gloria Mundi =

2019 film

- Film poster
- Directed by: Robert Guédiguian
- Written by: Robert Guédiguian; Serge Valletti
- Produced by: Marc Bordure; Robert Guédiguian
- Starring: Ariane Ascaride; Jean-Pierre Darroussin; Gérard Meylan; Anaïs Demoustier
- Cinematography: Pierre Milon
- Release date: 5 September 2019 (Venice)
- Running time: 106 minutes
- Country: France
- Language: French

Gloria Mundi is a 2019 French drama film directed by Robert Guédiguian. It was selected to compete for the Golden Lion at the 76th Venice International Film Festival. At the Venice Film Festival, Ariane Ascaride won the Volpi Cup for Best Actress.

== Synopsis ==
Daniel is released from prison after many years and returns to Marseille, where he reconnects with his former wife, Sylvie, who now lives with Richard. Sylvie tells him that their daughter Mathilda and her husband, Nicolas, have welcomed a baby girl named Gloria. The family is overjoyed by the new arrival, but they are all struggling financially. Sylvie works as an office cleaner, Nicolas earns a living as an Uber driver, and Richard works as a bus driver.

Their fragile situation begins to unravel when Nicolas is attacked by rival drivers. Determined to protect his family, Daniel attempts to seek justice and confront the challenges threatening their lives.

== Cast ==
- Ariane Ascaride as Sylvie
- Jean-Pierre Darroussin as Richard
- Gérard Meylan as Daniel
- Anaïs Demoustier as Mathilda
- Robinson Stévenin as Nicolas
- Lola Naymark as Aurore
- Grégoire Leprince-Ringuet as Bruno
- Yann Trégouët as the man in the emergency department
- Adrien Jolivet as cleaning company boss
