= The House by the Sea (2017 film) =

2017 film

- Film poster
- Directed by: Robert Guédiguian
- Written by: Robert Guédiguian; Serge Valletti
- Produced by: Marc Bordure; Robert Guédiguian
- Starring: Ariane Ascaride
- Cinematography: Pierre Milon
- Edited by: Bernard Sasia
- Distributed by: Diaphana
- Release dates: 3 September 2017 (Venice); 29 November 2017 (France)
- Running time: 107 minutes
- Country: France
- Language: French
- Budget: $4.1 million
- Box office: $5.7 million

The House by the Sea (French: La villa) is a 2017 French drama film directed by Robert Guédiguian. It was screened in the main competition section of the 74th Venice International Film Festival.

== Cast ==
- Ariane Ascaride as Angèle Barberini
- Jean-Pierre Darroussin as Joseph
- Gérard Meylan as Armand
- Jacques Boudet as Martin, father of Yvan
- Anaïs Demoustier as Bérangère
- Robinson Stévenin as Benjamin
- Yann Trégouët as Yvan
- Geneviève Mnich as Suzanne, mother of Yvan
- Fred Ulysse as Maurice, the dying father
- Diouc Koma as a soldier
- Haylana Bechir as a young refugee
- Ayoub Oaued as first refugee child
- Giani Rouxas as second refugee child
- Esther Seignon as Blanche
- Théau Courtès as adjutant

== Reception ==
On review aggregator website Rotten Tomatoes, the film holds an approval rating of 100% based on 7 reviews, and an average rating of 6.3/10. On Metacritic, the film has a weighted average score of 64 out of 100, based on 4 critics, indicating "generally favorable reviews".
