= Jacques Boudet =

French stage and screen actor (1935–2024)

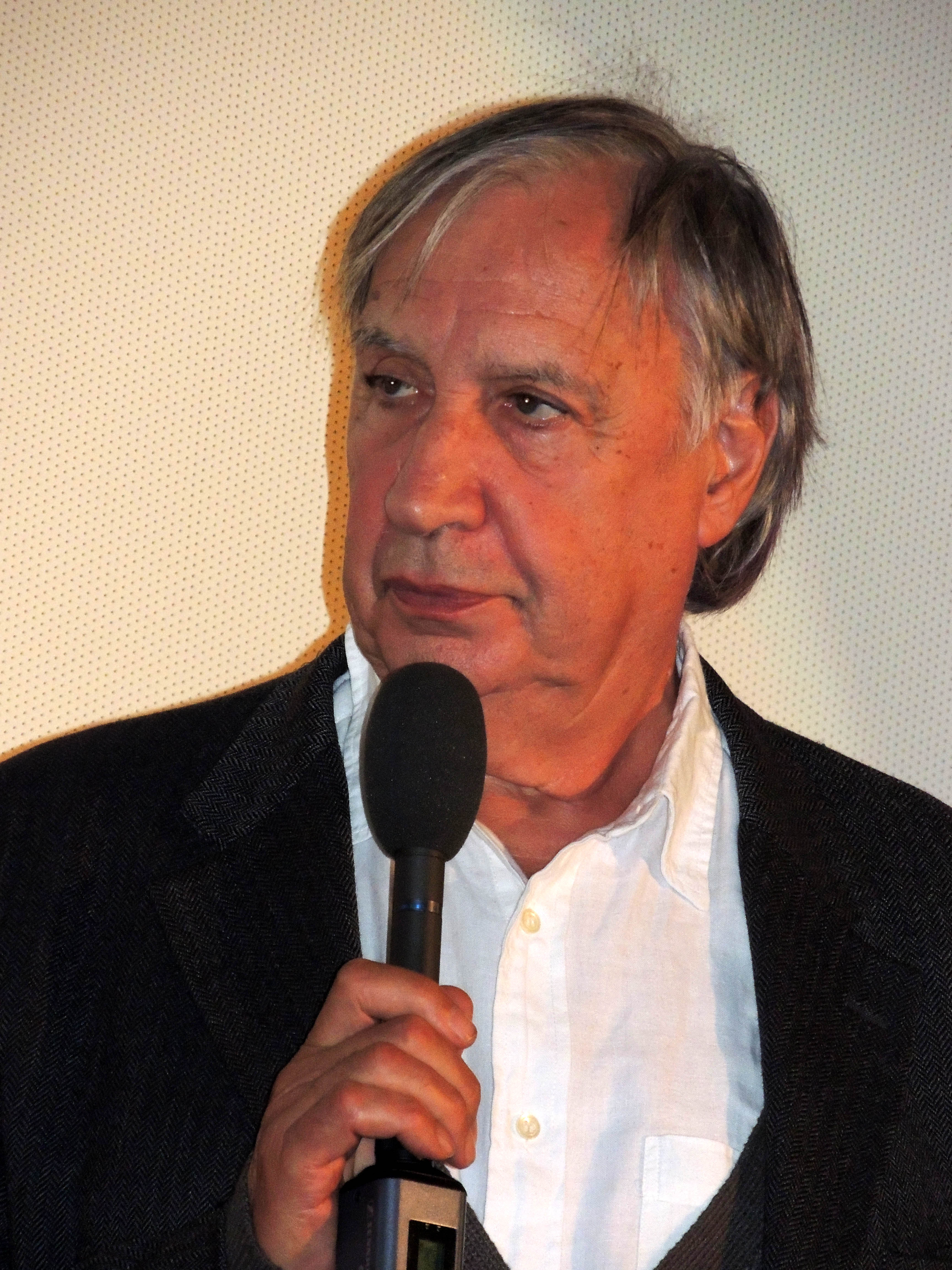
- Boudet in 2013
- Born: 15 April 1935; Montpellier, France
- Died: 15 July 2024 (aged 89); Montpellier, France
- Occupation: Actor
- Years active: 1963–2024

Jacques Boudet (French: [ʒak budɛ]; 15 April 1935 – 15 July 2024) was a French stage and screen actor. He had great success in the 1980s with his appearance in Exercises in Style, and is featured in the film The Names of Love (2010).

== Career ==
In cinema, he frequently appeared in films by Robert Guédiguian. He excelled in composite roles such as his Duc de Guermantes in Un amour de Swann, the brother of the character played by Philippe Noiret in Père et fils and the cynical politician with a southern French accent in L'Ivresse du pouvoir. He also appeared in the 1979 British TV play Churchill and the Generals as Charles de Gaulle.

== Death ==
Boudet died in his sleep at his home in Montpellier, France, on 15 July 2024, at the age of 89.

== Filmography ==
Year	Title	Role	Director	Notes
1967	La double méprise	The Domestic	Jean-Pierre Marchand	TV movie
1967	Lagardère	A Lackey	Jean-Pierre Decourt	TV mini-series
1971	La coqueluche		Christian-Paul Arrighi	
1975	That Most Important Thing: Love	Robert Beninge	Andrzej Żuławski	
1976	Dracula and Son		Édouard Molinaro	
1977	L'apprenti salaud	The Locksmith	Michel Deville	
1977	Le couple témoin	The Psychosociologiste	William Klein	
1977	Julie pot-de-colle	The Commissioner	Philippe de Broca	
1977	Tendre poulet	The Elegant Man	Philippe de Broca (2)	
1977	La question	Commander Roch	Laurent Heynemann	
1977	L'ombre et la nuit	The Psychoanalyst	Jean-Louis Leconte	
1978	On a marché sur les eaux		François Migeat	Short
1979	Revenir en décembre		Véronique Caillot	Short
1979	Churchill and the Generals	Charles de Gaulle	Alan Gibson	TV movie
1980	Bobo la tête		Gilles Katz	
1980	L'histoire du cahier anonyme		Olivier Douyère	Short
1980	Les amours des années folles	Laurent	Boramy Tioulong	TV series (1 episode)
1981	Strange Affair	M. Blain	Pierre Granier-Deferre	
1981	Asphalte		Denis Amar	
1981	Une affaire d'hommes		Nicolas Ribowski	
1981	Histoire contemporaine	M. Bonnaud	Michel Boisrond	TV mini-series
1981	Les gaietés de la correctionnelle	Trousselier	Jeannette Hubert	TV series (1 episode)
1982	Josepha	Moulu	Christopher Frank	
1982	Envers du décor		Marc Guiet	Short
1982	Jimmy Jazz	M. Colonna	Laurent Perrin	Short
1982	Mozart		Marcel Bluwal	TV mini-series
1983	Itinéraire bis	The Server	Christian Drillaud	
1983	Une pierre dans la bouche	Pump Attendant	Jean-Louis Leconte (2)	
1983	Un bruit qui court		Daniel Laloux & Jean-Pierre Sentier	
1984	Swann in Love	Duke de Guermantes	Volker Schlöndorff	
1984	Dangerous Moves	Stuffli	Richard Dembo	
1984	Rive droite, rive gauche	The Minister	Philippe Labro	
1984	Quidam		Gérard Marx	TV movie
1984	L'appartement	Falavigna	Dominique Giuliani	TV series (1 episode)
1985	Rouge midi	Fredou	Robert Guédiguian	
1986	Cours privé	Bonnier	Pierre Granier-Deferre (2)	
1986	Music Hall		Marcel Bluwal (2)	TV movie
1986	Cinéma 16	The Tailor	Philippe Condroyer	TV series (1 episode)
1987	Agent trouble	The Writer	Jean-Pierre Mocky	
1987	Buisson ardent	Henri's Father	Laurent Perrin (2)	
1987	American Playhouse	Guillaume Apollinaire	Jill Godmilow	TV series (1 episode)
1988	Natalia	André Brachaire	Bernard Cohn	
1988	La petite amie	Charles	Luc Béraud	
1988	La bête féroce		Magali Cerda	Short
1989	Ce qui me meut	Grégoire Charpentier	Cédric Klapisch	Short
1989	Le retour d'Arsène Lupin	Lawsky	Philippe Condroyer (2)	TV series (1 episode)
1990	La Femme Nikita	The Chemist	Luc Besson	
1990	Every Other Weekend	Jacquet	Nicole Garcia	
1990	L'ami Giono	Albernic	Marcel Bluwal (3)	TV movie
1990	La goutte d'or		Marcel Bluwal (4)	TV movie
1990	La belle Anglaise	Berthier	Jacques Besnard	TV series (1 episode)
1991	Merci la vie	Craven	Bertrand Blier	
1991	Dieu vomit les tièdes	Fernand	Robert Guédiguian (2)	
1991	Le coup suprême	Professor	Jean-Pierre Sentier (2)	
1991	Le cri du cochon		Alain Guesnier	
1991	Le piège	Schlessinger	Serge Moati	TV movie
1991	Les ritals		Marcel Bluwal (5)	TV movie
1992	The Return of Casanova	Abbot	Édouard Niermans	
1992	L.627	Raymond	Bertrand Tavernier	
1992	Navarro	François Ferrat	Yvan Butler	TV series (1 episode)
1993	Tout ça... pour ça !	The Prosecutor	Claude Lelouch	
1993	L'argent fait le bonheur	M. Goudre	Robert Guédiguian (3)	
1993	Hélène traverse la Manche		Franciska Moeneclay	Short
1993	L'homme dans la nuit	Fléchard	Claude Boissol	TV movie
1993	Navarro	Jean-Louis Seurat	Nicolas Ribowski (2)	TV series (1 episode)
1993	Ferbac	Inspector Bertin	Bruno Gantillon	TV series (1 episode)
1994	Farinelli	Felipe V	Gérard Corbiau	
1994	Des feux mal éteints	Newspaper Boss	Serge Moati (2)	
1994	Le nez au vent		Lucie Caries	Short
1994	Pas si grand que ça !	The Teacher	Bruno Herbulot	TV movie
1994	La récréation	The Inspector	Nicolas Ribowski (3)	TV movie
1994	La guerre des privés	Desgranges	Josée Dayan	TV series (1 episode)
1994	Renseignements généraux	Lemoult	Boramy Tioulong (2)	TV series (1 episode)
1995	Les Misérables	The Doctor	Claude Lelouch (2)	
1995	À la vie, à la mort!	Papa Carlossa	Robert Guédiguian (4)	
1995	Marie-Louise ou la permission		Manuel Flèche	
1995	Pressions		Sanvi Panou	Short
1995	Lulu roi de France	The Count	Bernard Uzan	TV movie
1995	Julie Lescaut	M. de Courcy	Élisabeth Rappeneau	TV series (1 episode)
1995	Chercheur d'héritiers	François Guyon	Laurent Heynemann (2)	TV series (1 episode)
1996	Rainbow pour Rimbaud	The Minister	Jean Teulé	
1996	Les Cordier, juge et flic	The Piedmontese	Bruno Herbulot (2)	TV series (1 episode)
1997	Marius and Jeannette	Justin	Robert Guédiguian (5)	
1997	An Air So Pure	M. Elmer	Yves Angelo	
1997	Tenue correcte exigée	The Judge	Philippe Lioret	
1997	Sapho	Caoudal	Serge Moati (3)	TV movie
1997	Nini	André	Myriam Touzé	TV movie
1998	À la place du coeur	Monsieur Lévy	Robert Guédiguian (6)	
1998	Les beaux pères	Harmond	Guillaume Tunzini	Short
1998	Les marchands de gloire	Lucien Grandel	Georges Folgoas	TV movie
1998	The Count of Monte Cristo	President of the Room	Josée Dayan (2)	TV mini-series
1998	Maigret	Inspector Cadavre	Pierre Joassin	TV series (1 episode)
1999	The Children of the Marshland	Tane	Jean Becker	
1999	Le plus beau pays du monde	Clothaire	Marcel Bluwal (6)	
1999	Le bleu des villes	The Chief	Stéphane Brizé	
1999	Dessine-moi un jouet	Abbot Michalon	Hervé Baslé	TV movie
1999	Joséphine, ange gardien	Café's Owner	Dominique Baron	TV series (1 episode)
1999	Dossier : disparus	Father Marc	Paolo Barzman	TV series (1 episode)
2000	Bellyful	Henri	Melvin Van Peebles	
2000	The Town Is Quiet	Paul's Father	Robert Guédiguian (7)	
2000	À l'attaque !	Pépé Moliterno	Robert Guédiguian (8)	
2000	Une rue dans sa longueur	The Third Man	Thomas Salvador	Short
2001	Mademoiselle	Gilbert Frémont	Philippe Lioret (2)	
2001	The Milk of Human Kindness	Jean-François	Dominique Cabrera	
2001	Tanguy	The Judge	Étienne Chatiliez	
2001	De toute urgence	François	Philippe Triboit	TV movie
2001	Maigret	Descharneaux	Pierre Granier-Deferre (3)	TV series (1 episode)
2001	Chercheur d'héritiers	The Notary	Patrice Martineau	TV series (1 episode)
2002	Safe Conduct	Café's Owner	Bertrand Tavernier (2)	
2002	Marie-Jo and Her Two Lovers	Jean-Christophe	Robert Guédiguian (9)	
2002	Il buma	Ben	Giovanni Massa	
2002	Commissariat Bastille	Edmond Valençay d'Argenton	Jean-Marc Seban, Gilles Béhat & Jacques Malaterre	TV series (7 episodes)
2003	Père et fils	Joseph	Michel Boujenah	
2003	Midi à sa porte...		Michel Alexandre	Short
2003	Jean Moulin, une affaire française	Charles de Gaulle	Pierre Aknine	TV movie
2003	Ambre a disparu	Mordelles	Denys Granier-Deferre	TV movie
2004	Mon père est ingénieur	Natacha's Father	Robert Guédiguian (10)	
2004	La confiance règne	Philippe Térion	Étienne Chatiliez (2)	
2004	L'empreinte	Paul Vannier	David Mathieu-Mahias	
2004	La faucheuse à ma mère	The Father	Carole Guenot	Short
2004	Une autre vie		Bernadette Massin & Fabrice Nicot	Short
2004	Mon fils cet inconnu	Bernard	Caroline Huppert	TV movie
2004	Le grand patron	Marcel Bonmartin	Christian Bonnet	TV series (1 episode)
2005	Cache cache	The Dentist	Yves Caumon	
2005	L'arbre et l'oiseau	M. Ruche	Marc Rivière	TV movie
2005	La pomme de Newton	Michel	Laurent Firode	TV movie
2005	Joséphine, ange gardien	Malleval	Sylvie Ayme	TV series (1 episode)
2006	Comedy of Power	Descarts	Claude Chabrol	
2006	Those Happy Days	Albert	Éric Toledano and Olivier Nakache	
2006	The Colonel	The Senator	Laurent Herbiet	
2006	Le passager de l'été	Father Saucey	Florence Moncorgé-Gabin	
2006	Plus ou moins		Gianguido Spinelli	Short
2007	Trivial	Commissioner Penaud	Sophie Marceau	
2007	Polichinelle	The Father	David Braun	Short
2007	Chez Maupassant	The Minister	Claude Chabrol (2)	TV series (1 episode)
2008	Lady Jane	Henri	Robert Guédiguian (11)	
2008	Agathe Cléry	Roland Cléry	Étienne Chatiliez (3)	
2008	À droite toute	Chanoine Vivié	Marcel Bluwal (7)	TV mini-series
2009	Le coach	Jacques Marmignon	Olivier Doran	
2009	Au siècle de Maupassant	Judge Boissec	Claude Chabrol (3)	TV series (1 episode)
2010	Romantics Anonymous	Rémi	Jean-Pierre Améris	
2010	The Names of Love	Lucien Martin	Michel Leclerc	
2010	La très excellente et divertissante histoire de François Rabelais	Jean du Bellay	Hervé Baslé (2)	TV movie
2010	Les toqués	Mr. Dutot	Laurence Katrian	TV series (1 episode)
2011	The Minister	Senator July	Pierre Schoeller	
2011	Beur sur la ville	The Minister	Djamel Bensalah	
2011	De force	Jacques de Saint-Amont	Frank Henry	
2011	La résistance de grenadine	Francis	Philippe Collet	Short
2011	Château Mouton Rothschild	Étienne	Louis Aubert	Short
2011	Bas les coeurs	The Mayor	Robin Davis	TV movie
2011	Longue peine	Charles Grimaud	Christian Bonnet (2)	TV movie
2011	Les Edelweiss	Jacques Crozat	Philippe Proteau	TV series (1 episode)
2012	Farewell, My Queen	Monsieur de la Tour du Pin	Benoît Jacquot	
2012	Voyage sans retour	Judge Tollec	François Gérard	
2012	La ville est calme	Wolfgang Léonard	Alexandre Labarussiat	Short
2012	Parle tout bas, Si c'est d'amour	Clément	Sylvain Monod	TV movie
2012	R.I.S, police scientifique	Father Maxime Vernon	Julien Zidi	TV series (1 episode)
2012	Plus belle la vie	Gaston Domert	Christophe Reichert & Emmanuel Rigaut	TV series (5 episodes)
2013	Shanghai Belleville	Henri	Show-Chun Lee	
2013	La Famille Katz	Osie	Arnauld Mercadier	TV series (6 episodes)
2014	Ariane's Thread	Jacques	Robert Guédiguian (12)	
2014	Memories	The Painter	Jean-Paul Rouve	
2014	Rosenn		Yvan Le Moine	
2014	Pointe noire	Michel	Ludovic Vieuille	Short
2015	14 Juillet	René	Michaël Barocas	Short
2015	The Childhood of a Leader	The Priest	Brady Corbet	
2015	Shanghai Belleville	Le retraité français / Henri	Show-Chun Lee	
2015	Le chapeau de Mitterrand	President Desmoines	Robin Davis	TV movie
2017	Loue-moi!	Papyto	Coline Assous & Virginie Schwartz	
2017	Sales gosses	François	Frédéric Quiring	
2017	The House by the Sea	Martin - le père d'Yvan	Robert Guédiguian	
2017	The Crown	Charles de Gaulle	Stephen Daldry	TV series (Episode: "Dear Mrs. Kennedy")
2017	Paris etc	Le père de Marianne et Mathilde	Zabou Breitman	TV series (5 episodes)
2018	Lola et ses frères	Vieux monsieur au cimetière	Jean-Paul Rouve	
2019	La lutte des classes	Le père de Paul	Michel Leclerc	
2019	A Good Doctor	M. Xanakis	Tristan Séguéla	
2019	La loi de Damien	Pierre Turenne	Arnaud Sélignac	TV series (1 episodes)
2020	Polseres vermelles	Mr. Chergui		TV series (2 episodes)
2021	Super Z	PDG	Julien de Volte & Arnaud Tabarly	
2023	Little Girl Blue	Daniel Cordier	Mona Achache	

== Theater ==
Year	Title	Author	Director	Notes
1963	Gurvan	Tanguy Malmanche	Jean Moign	
1966	Amphitryon	Molière	Henri Massadau	
1966	Don Carlos	Friedrich Schiller	Stephan Meldegg	
1967	Six Characters in Search of an Author	Luigi Pirandello	Gabriel Monnet	
1969	The Tempest	William Shakespeare	Jean-Marie Serreau	
1972	Le Printemps des Bonnets Rouges	Paol Keineg	Jean-Marie Serreau (2)	
1974	Pol	Alain Didier-Weill	Jacques Seiler	Théâtre de la Gaîté-Montparnasse
1975	Lear	Edward Bond	Patrice Chéreau	Odéon-Théâtre de l'Europe
1976	As You Like It	William Shakespeare	Benno Besson	Festival d'Avignon
1977	Hamlet	William Shakespeare	Benno Besson (2)	Festival d'Avignon
1978	Déménagement	Anne-Marie Kraemer	Jacques Kraemer	Festival d’Avignon
1979	Attention au travail	A Collective	Gildas Bourdet	
1980–1982	Exercises in Style	Raymond Queneau	Jacques Seiler (2)	Théâtre des Célestins
1984	La Bagarre	Roger Vitrac	Jacques Seiler (3)	Théâtre de l'Atelier
1986	The Miser	Molière	Roger Planchon	Théâtre Mogador
1987	The Birthday Party	Harold Pinter	Jean-Michel Ribes	
1989–1990	Monsieur Songe	Robert Pinget	Jacques Seiler (4)	Théâtre de l'Œuvre
1990	Exercises in Style	Raymond Queneau	Jacques Seiler (5)	Théâtre de l'Œuvre
1990	The School for Wives	Molière	Marcel Maréchal	
1992	The Boors	Carlo Goldoni	Jérôme Savary	
1993	The Cherry Orchard	Anton Tchekhov	Marcel Maréchal (2)	
1994	The Resistible Rise of Arturo Ui	Bertolt Brecht	Jérôme Savary (2)	
1995	Mother Courage and Her Children	Bertolt Brecht	Jérôme Savary (3)	
1996	Macbeth	William Shakespeare	Jérôme Savary (4)	
1998	Les Marchands de gloire	Marcel Pagnol	Michel Fagadau	
1999	Celui qui a dit non	Robert Hossein	Robert Hossein	
2001	Crime and Punishment	Fyodor Dostoyevsky	Robert Hossein (2)	Théâtre Marigny
2001	Les apparences sont trompeuses	Thomas Bernhard	Robert Cantarella	
2004	Mrs. Warren's Profession	George Bernard Shaw	Michel Fagadau (2)	Théâtre des Champs-Élysées
2005	Loot	Joe Orton	Marion Bierry	
2007	Leonce and Lena	Georg Büchner	Jean-Baptiste Sastre	Théâtre national de Chaillot
2007–2008	Un Chapeau de Paille d'Italie	Eugène Labiche & Marc-Michel	Jean-Baptiste Sastre (2)	Théâtre national de Chaillot
2009	The Birthday Party	Harold Pinter	Michel Fagadau (3)	Théâtre des Champs-Élysées
2010	Krapp's Last Tape	Samuel Beckett	Christophe Gand	Théâtre du Palais-Royal
2012	Tartarin of Tarascon	Alphonse Daudet	Jérôme Savary (5)	
2013	The Dumb Waiter	Harold Pinter	Christophe Gand (2)	
2014	Visiting Mr. Green	Jeff Baron	Thomas Joussier	
