= Jean-Pierre Darroussin =

French actor and film director (born 1953)

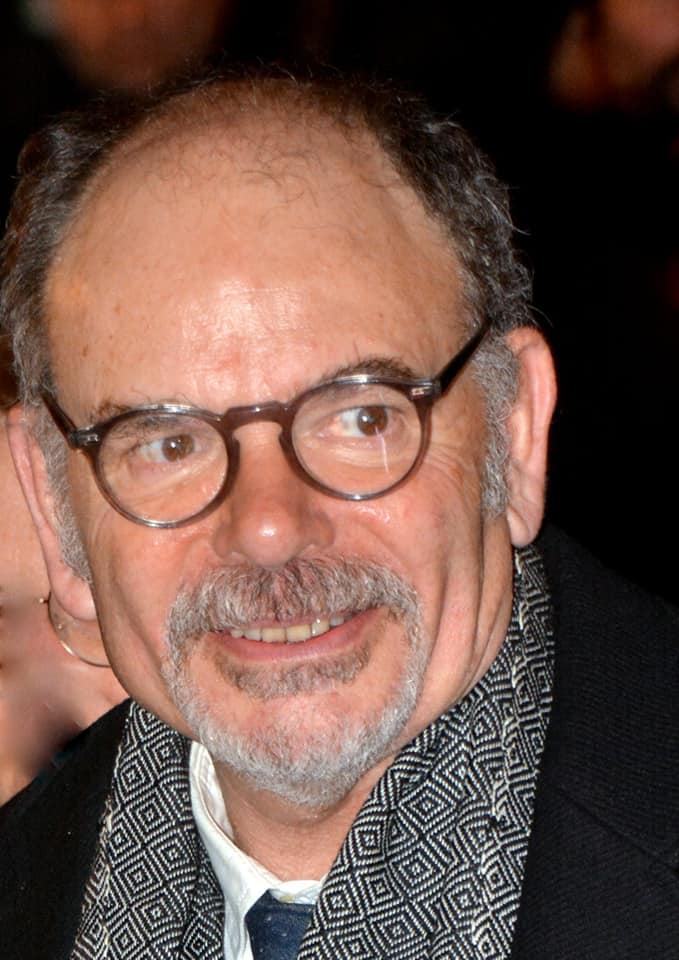
- Jean-Pierre Darroussin in 2020
- Born: 4 December 1953 (age 72); Courbevoie, Hauts-de-Seine, France
- Occupations: Actor, film director, screenwriter
- Years active: 1979–present
- Children: 3

Jean-Pierre Darroussin (born 4 December 1953) is a French actor and filmmaker. He was born in Courbevoie, France.

== Theatre ==
Year	Title	Author	Director	Notes
1982	Gevrey-Chambertin	Alain Gautré & Pierre Pradinas	Pierre Pradinas	
1983	Les Amis de Monsieur Gazon	Pierre & Simon Pradinas	Pierre Pradinas	
1986	The Seagull	Anton Chekhov	Pierre Pradinas	
1989	Le Secret	Henri Bernstein	Andreas Voutsinas	
1991	Cuisine et Dépendances	Agnès Jaoui & Jean-Pierre Bacri	Stéphan Meldegg	Nominated - Molière Award for Best Supporting Actor
1994	Un air de famille	Agnès Jaoui & Jean-Pierre Bacri	Stéphan Meldegg	Nominated - Molière Award for Best Supporting Actor
1997	La Terrasse	Jean-Claude Carrière	Bernard Murat	Nominated - Molière Award for Best Supporting Actor
2005–2006	Leshiy	Anton Chekhov	Roger Planchon	
2009	La Chapelle-en-Brie	Alain Gautré	Alain Gautré	
2011	Une banale histoire	Anton Chekhov	Marc Dugain	
2013	Calme	Lars Norén	Jean-Louis Martinelli	
2013	Address Unknown	Kathrine Taylor	Delphine de Malherbe	
2018–2019	Art	Yasmina Reza	Patrice Kerbrat	Molière Award for Best Actor

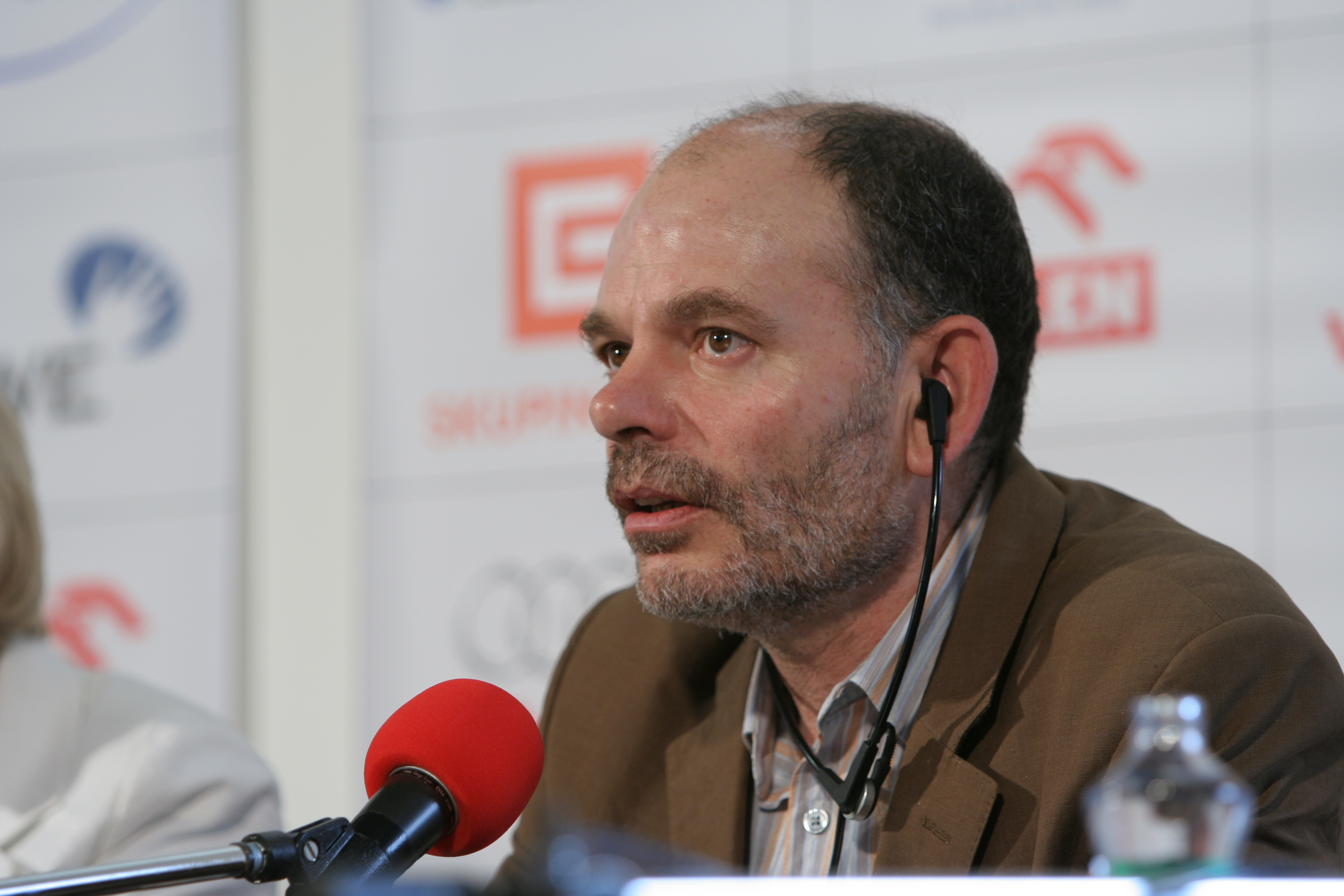
Jean-Pierre Darroussin

== Filmography ==
=== Actor ===
Year	Title	Role	Director	Notes
1979	Coup de tête	The photographer	Jean-Jacques Annaud	
1980	Cinéma 16	The student	Philippe Laïk	TV series (1 episode)
1980	La vie des autres	Jean-Pierre Vitry	Emmanuel Fonlladosa	TV series (1 episode)
1981	Psy	Jacques	Philippe de Broca	
1981	Est-ce bien raisonnable?	Henri	Georges Lautner	
1981	Celles qu'on n'a pas eues...	Amédée	Pascal Thomas	
1982	Eden		Robert Réa	Short
1983	Orphée	Heurtebise	Claude Santelli	TV movie
1983	Après tout ce qu'on a fait pour toi	The journalist	Jacques Fansten	TV movie
1984	Our Story	The second passenger	Bertrand Blier	
1984	Les amis de monsieur Gazon	Claude	Jeannette Hubert	TV movie
1985	Elsa, Elsa	Geof	Didier Haudepin	
1985	Slices of Life	The journalist	François Leterrier	
1985	He Died with His Eyes Open	Moulard	Jacques Deray	
1986	Ki lo sa?	Dada	Robert Guédiguian	
1989	My Best Pals	Daniel Peccoud	Jean-Marie Poiré	
1989	Les dossiers secrets de l'inspecteur Lavardin	Jean Leroux	Christian de Chalonge	TV series (1 episode)
1990	Mado, Hold for Pick Up	The shepherd	Aleksandr Adabashyan	
1990	La grande dune	Dr. Demarquez	Bernard Stora	TV movie
1990	Un privé au soleil	Sylvain Brice	Jacques Fontanier	TV series (1 episode)
1991	L'amour en deux	Matthias	Jean-Claude Gallotta	
1991	Le cri du cochon		Alain Guesnier	
1991	Dieu vomit les tièdes	Cochise	Robert Guédiguian	
1991	Cauchemar Blanc		Mathieu Kassovitz	Short
1991	18 rue Popincourt		Pascal Laëthier	Short
2011	Le Havre (film)	Monet	Aki Kaurismäki	

- 1992: Riens du tout (directed by Cédric Klapisch starring Fabrice Luchini, Daniel Berlioux) - Domrémy
- 1993: Cuisine et dépendances (directed by Philippe Muyl starring Zabou Breitman, Sam Karmann) - Fred
- 1993: L'Argent fait le bonheur (directed by Robert Guédiguian starring Ariane Ascaride) - Le Curé
- 1994: Cache Cash (directed by Claude Pinoteau) - Jean
- 1994: L'Eau froide (directed by Olivier Assayas starring Virginie Ledoyen, Cyprien Fouquet) - Inspecteur
- 1995: Le Fabuleux Destin de Mme Petlet (directed by Camille de Casabianca) - Hervé Reyter
- 1995: À la vie, à la mort! (directed by Robert Guédiguian starring Ariane Ascaride, Gérard Meylan) - Jaco
- 1996: Mon Homme (directed by Bertrand Blier starring Anouk Grinberg, Gérard Lanvin) - Gilbert's Client
- 1996: Un air de famille (directed by Cédric Klapisch starring Jean-Pierre Bacri, Wladimir Yordanoff) - Denis
- 1997: Marius et Jeannette (directed by Robert Guédiguian starring Gérard Meylan, Ariane Ascaride) - Dédé
- 1997: On connaît la chanson (directed by Alain Resnais starring Sabine Azéma, Pierre Arditi) - Young Man with Cheque
- 1998: Si je t'aime, prends garde à toi (directed by Jeanne Labrune starring Nathalie Baye, Daniel Duval) - Voyageur de commerce
- 1998: À la Place du Coeur (directed by Robert Guédiguian starring Ariane Ascaride, Christine Brucher) - Joël Patché
- 1998: Le Poulpe (directed by Guillaume Nicloux starring Clotilde Courau) - Gabriel Lecouvreur, 'le Poulpe'
- 1999: Qui plume la lune ? (directed by Christine Carrière avec Jean-Pierre Darroussin, Garance Clavel) - Lucien
- 1999: C'est quoi la vie ? (directed by François Dupeyron starring Éric Caravaca, Jacques Dufilho) - Marc, le père
- 1999: Inséparables (directed by Michel Couvelard starring Catherine Frot) - Robert
- 1999: La Bûche (directed by Danièle Thompson starring Sabine Azéma, Emmanuelle Béart) - Gilbert
- 2000: Le Goût des autres (The Taste of Others), directed by Agnès Jaoui starring Anne Alvaro, Gérard Lanvin) - Un spectateur au théâtre (uncredited)
- 2000: À l'attaque! (directed by Robert Guédiguian starring Ariane Ascaride, Jacques Boudet) - Jean-Do
- 2000: La ville est tranquille (directed by Robert Guédiguian starring Ariane Ascaride) - Paul
- 2000: Ça ira mieux demain (directed by Jeanne Labrune starring Nathalie Baye) - Xavier
- 2000: Poitiers, voiture 11 (Short, directed by François Dupeyron et Yves Angelo starring Rabah Loucif)
- 2001: Pas d'histoire ! (Regards sur le racisme au quotidien de Philippe Jullien et Yamina Benguigui) - (segment "Poitiers, voiture 11")
- 2001: L'Art (délicat) de la séduction (directed by Richard Berry starring Patrick Timsit, Cécile de France) - Monsieur Hubert
- 2001: 15 août (directed by Patrick Alessandrin starring Richard Berry, Charles Berling) - Raoul
- 2002: A Private Affair (directed by Guillaume Nicloux starring Thierry Lhermitte, Marion Cotillard) - Homme Apolus
- 2002: Marie-Jo et ses deux amours (directed by Robert Guédiguian starring Ariane Ascaride) - Daniel
- 2002: Mille millièmes, fantaisie immobilière (directed by Rémi Waterhouse starring Irène Jacob) - Patrick Bertil
- 2002: Ah ! si j'étais riche (If I Were a Rich Man) (directed by Michel Munz et Gérard Bitton) (starring Valeria Bruni-Tedeschi) - Aldo
- 2002: C'est le bouquet ! (directed by Jeanne Labrune starring Hélène Lapiower, Richard Debuisne) - Raphaël
- 2003: Le Cœur des hommes (directed by Marc Esposito starring Gérard Darmon) - Manu
- 2003: The Car Keys - Un comédien qui refuse de tourner avec Laurent
- 2003: Red Lights (Feux rouges) (directed by Cédric Kahn avec Jean-Pierre Darroussin, Carole Bouquet) - Antoine
- 2004: Cause toujours ! (directed by Jeanne Labrune) - Bruno
- 2004: Mon père est ingénieur (directed by Robert Guédiguian starring Ariane Ascaride, Jean-Pierre Darroussin) - Jérémie / Joseph
- 2004: Un long dimanche de fiançailles (A Very Long Engagement) (directed by Jean-Pierre Jeunet starring Audrey Tautou) - Benjamin Gordes
- 2005: Saint-Jacques... La Mecque (directed by Coline Serreau) - Claude
- 2005: How Much Do You Love Me? (Combien tu m'aimes?) (directed by Bertrand Blier) - André Migot
- 2005: Le cactus - Renard
- 2006: Toute la beauté du monde - Michel
- 2006: Le Voyage en Arménie (directed by Robert Guédiguian) - Pierre
- 2006: Le Pressentiment (directed by Jean-Pierre Darroussin) - Charles Bénesteau
- 2007: J'attends quelqu'un (directed by Jérôme Bonnell) - Louis Renard
- 2007: Dialogue avec mon jardinier (directed by Jean Becker) - Le jardinier Léo dit Dujardin
- 2007: Fragile(s) (directed by Martin Valente) - Yves
- 2007: Le Cœur des hommes 2 (directed by Marc Esposito) - Manu
- 2008: Le septième juré (Jury Duty, or The Seventh Juror) (TV Movie, directed by Edouard Niermans) - Grégoire Duval
- 2008: Lady Jane (directed by Robert Guédiguian) - François
- 2008: Le voyage aux Pyrénées - Alexandre Darou
- 2008: Les Grandes Personnes (directed by Anna Novion) - Albert
- 2009: Bank Error in Your Favour - Étienne
- 2009: Rien de personnel - Bruno Couffe
- 2009: The Army of Crime (directed by Robert Guédiguian) - Inspecteur Pujol
- 2009: La dame de trèfle - Simon Sarasian
- 2010: The Immortal (directed by Richard Berry) - Martin Beaudinard
- 2010: Holiday (directed by Guillaume Nicloux) - Michel Trémois
- 2011: The Well-Digger's Daughter - M. Mazel
- 2011: The Snows of Kilimanjaro - Michel
- 2011: Le Havre (directed by Aki Kaurismäki) - Monet
- 2011: De bon matin - Paul
- 2011: Early One Morning - L'abbé Moyon
- 2012: Rendez-vous à Kiruna - Ernest Toussaint
- 2013: Jasmine - (voice)
- 2013: Marius - Panisse
- 2013: Fanny - Panisse
- 2013: One of a Kind - Le père
- 2013: Le coeur des hommes 3 - Manu
- 2014: Paris Follies - Xavier Lecanu
- 2014: Get Well Soon - Hervé Laurent
- 2014: Ariane's Thread- le chauffeur de taxi / Le metteur en scène
- 2015: Heat Wave - Daniel Huot-Marchand
- 2015-2018: Le Bureau des Légendes (The Bureau) - Henri Duflot
- 2016: A Woman's Life - Le baron Simon-Jacques Le Perthuis des Vauds
- 2017: The House by the Sea - Joseph
- 2017: Promise at Dawn - Zaremba
- 2018: Chacun pour tous - Martin
- 2019: The Dazzled - Le Berger
- 2019: Gloria Mundi - Richard Benar

=== Director/Writer ===
Year	Title	Notes
1992	C'est trop con!	Short; Angers European First Film Festival - Best Short Film
2006	Premonition	French Syndicate of Cinema Critics - Best First Film; Louis Delluc Prize - Best First Film; Nominated - Montreal World Film Festival - Golden Zenith

== Author ==
Year	Book	Publisher
2015	Et le souvenir que je garde au cœur	Editions Fayard
