= List of Albanian European Film Award winners and nominees =

This is a list of Albanian European Film Award winners and nominees. This list details the performances of Albanian actors, actresses, and films that have either been submitted or nominated for, or have won, a European Film Award.

== Awards and nominations ==
| Year (Ceremony) | Award | Recipient | Result | Note | Ref. |
|---|---|---|---|---|---|
| 1995 (8th) | European Film Academy Critics Award | Ulysses' Gaze | Won | Greek-German-French-British-Bosnian-Albanian-Yugoslav-Italian-Romanian co-production | |
| 2008 (21st) | Best Actress | Arta Dobroshi for Lorna's Silence | Nominated | Kosovan-Albanian actress | |
| 2016 (29th) | Best Short Film | Home | Nominated | Kosovan-British-Albanian co-production | |

- Nominations – 3
- Wins – 1

== See also ==
- List of Albanian submissions for the Academy Award for Best Foreign Language Film
