= Les Cousins =

Les Cousins may refer to:

- Les Cousins (music club), a 1960s folk and blues club in Greek Street, Soho, London
- Les Cousins (film), a 1959 film by Claude Chabrol

== See also ==
- Le cousin
- L. S. Cousins
