= A Woman Today =

2026 French drama film

- French promotional poster
- French: Une femme aujourd'hui
- Directed by: Robert Guédiguian
- Written by: Robert Guédiguian; Serge Valletti
- Produced by: Marc Bordure; Robert Guédiguian
- Starring: Marilou Aussilloux; Ariane Ascaride; Jean-Pierre Darroussin; Grégoire Leprince-Ringuet; Gérard Meylan; Lola Naymark
- Cinematography: Pierre Milon
- Edited by: Bernard Sasia
- Music by: Michel Petrossian
- Production company: Agat Films
- Distributed by: Officine UBU (Italy)
- Release date: 4 September 2026 (Venice)
- Running time: 123 minutes
- Countries: France; Italy

A Woman Today (French: Une femme aujourd'hui) is a 2026 film directed by Robert Guédiguian, and co-written with Serge Valletti. It stars Marilou Aussilloux as Juliette, a woman seeking a new lease on life after an assault, alongside Guédiguian regulars Ariane Ascaride, Jean-Pierre Darroussin, Grégoire Leprince-Ringuet, and Gérard Meylan.

The film had its world premiere in the Giornate degli Autori section of the 83rd Venice International Film Festival on 4 September 2026, where it won the Europa Label prize.

== Synopsis ==
Finance worker Juliette enjoys a carefree life of trips to Tokyo and casual relationships, resisting her mother's pressure to give her grandchildren. This all changes when she is assaulted by a colleague at a work event, leading Juliette to seek new forms of meaning in her life. In the aftermath, she nearly crashes her car into a home for unwed mothers, where she becomes a volunteer and grows close to one of the home's organizers.

== Cast ==
- Marilou Aussilloux as Juliette, a 35-year old woman
- Ariane Ascaride as Cathy, Juliette's mother
- Jean-Pierre Darroussin as Mr. Derval, Juliette's neighbor
- Grégoire Leprince-Ringuet as Christian
- Gérard Meylan as Alex
- Lola Naymark as Rebecca

== Production ==
A Woman Today was produced by Agat Films in co-production with Bibi Film and ARTE France Cinéma.

== Release ==
A Woman Today debuted on September 4, 2026 in the Giornate degli Autori section of that year's Venice Film Festival. Guédiguian was awarded the section's Europa Label Cinemas award.

== Response ==
=== Accolades ===
| Year | Award | Category | Recipient(s) | Result | Ref. |
|---|---|---|---|---|---|
| 2026 | Venice Film Festival | Giornate degli Autori Director's Award | Robert Guédiguian | Nominated | |
| 2026 | Venice Film Festival | Giornate degli Autori Europa Label Cinemas | Robert Guédiguian | Won | |
