= Special Delivery (2002 film) =

- Directed by: Jeanne Labrune
- Written by: Jeanne Labrune
- Produced by: Alain Sarde
- Starring: Sandrine Kiberlain; Jean-Pierre Darroussin
- Cinematography: Christophe Pollock
- Edited by: Guy Lecorne
- Music by: Bruno Fontaine
- Distributed by: BAC Films
- Release date: 11 December 2002
- Running time: 99 minutes
- Country: France
- Language: French
- Budget: $5.8 million
- Box office: $3 million

Special Delivery (French: C'est le bouquet !) is a 2002 French comedy film directed by Jeanne Labrune.

== Cast ==
- Sandrine Kiberlain - Catherine
- Jean-Pierre Darroussin - Raphaël
- Dominique Blanc - Edith
- Mathieu Amalric - Stéphane
- Jean-Claude Brialy - Robert Fresnel
- Maurice Bénichou - Antoine
- Hélène Lapiower - Alice
- Dominique Besnehard - Laurent
- Richard Debuisne - Emmanuel Kirsch
- Gisèle Casadesus - The lady
- Didier Bezace - The theater director
- László Szabó - The guardian
- Lise Lamétrie - The maid
