= My Life on Ice =

- French theatrical release poster
- French: Ma vraie vie à Rouen
- Directed by: Olivier Ducastel; Jacques Martineau
- Written by: Olivier Ducastel; Jacques Martineau
- Produced by: Nicolas Blanc
- Starring: Ariane Ascaride; Jonathan Zaccaï; Hélène Surgère; Lucas Bonnifait; Jimmy Tavares
- Cinematography: Matthieu Poirot-Delpech; Pierre Milon
- Edited by: Sabine Mamou
- Music by: Philippe Miller
- Production companies: Agat Films & Cie; Canal+
- Distributed by: Rézo Films
- Release dates: 5 August 2002 (Locarno); 26 February 2003 (France)
- Running time: 102 minutes
- Country: France
- Language: French
- Box office: $77,618

My Life on Ice (French: Ma vraie vie à Rouen, lit. 'My real life in Rouen') is a 2002 French teen drama film directed by Olivier Ducastel and Jacques Martineau, which tracks a year in the life of a teenage figure skater in a quasi-documentary, video diary style.

== Plot ==
The film centers on Étienne, who lives in Rouen with his mother and grandmother and intends to take part in the national figure skating championship. For his 16th birthday, his grandmother gives him a digital camcorder as a present, which he starts to use immediately (supplying the introductory scenes of the film).

Étienne films anything and everything around him – his family, his teacher Laurent, Ludovic, his best friend, himself figure skating, the sea, steep cliffs. As for Ludovic and his geography teacher, it soon becomes apparent that his obsession with them is grounded in more than just artistic pursuits. Étienne's homosexuality becomes more and more clear both to him and the audience over the course of the film.

Even though Étienne is determined to make this year "the year of love", the year when everything turns around for him, things do not go as well as anticipated. He makes a blunder in his figure skating performance and only achieves second place. After a night of drinking, during which Laurent, who is in a relationship with Etienne's mother, seems to show Etienne an ambiguous mutual attraction, Etienne witnesses Laurent's fall from a cliff; a fall that the viewer, like Etienne, will understand as deliberate, probably due to the young boy's frustration. And when he starts, very carefully, to talk to Ludovic about the possibility of two men being in love, Ludovic runs away.

In the final minutes of the film, the purpose of Étienne's video diary gets clear: Feeling he has failed in what he set out to do and being deeply hurt by Ludovic's resentment, Étienne decides to jump from the cliff and leave the camcorder (which he sets up to film his suicide) behind to explain to his family what he went through.

Luckily, a stranger walks by at that moment and notices the boy close to the cliff and his camera nearby. The final scene shows the stranger and Étienne in bed after sex, with Étienne seeming truly happy for the first time.

== Cast ==
- Jimmy Tavares as Étienne
- Ariane Ascaride as Caroline, Étienne's mother
- Jonathan Zaccaï as Laurent, Étienne's teacher and his mother's boyfriend
- Hélène Surgère as Étienne's grandmother
- Lucas Bonnifait as Ludovic, Étienne's best friend
- Hanako Bron as Vanessa, Ludovic's girlfriend
- Frédéric Gorny as the young man at the cliff
