= European Film Academy Critics Award =

European Film Award - Prix Fipresci:

== Nominees and winners ==
=== 1990s ===
English title	Original title	Director(s)	Producer(s)	Country of production	Country of co-production
1993
Benny's Video		Michael Haneke	Veit Heiduschka	(Austria)	(Switzerland)
1994
Dear Diary	Caro diario	Nanni Moretti	Nanni Moretti	(Italy)	(France)
1995
Ulysses' Gaze	Το βλέμμα του Οδυσσέα	Theo Angelopoulos	Phoebe Economopoulos, Eric Heumann, Giorgio Silvagni	(Greece)	(Germany) (France) (United Kingdom) (Bosnia and Herzegovina) (Albania) (Federal Republic of Yugoslavia) (Italy) (Romania)
1996
Breaking the Waves		Lars von Trier	Peter Aalbæk Jensen, Vibeke Windeløv	(Denmark)	(Germany) (France) (Norway) (Iceland) (Sweden) (Spain) (Netherlands)
1997
Voyage to the Beginning of the World	Viagem ao Princípio do Mundo	Manoel de Oliveira	Paulo Branco	(Portugal)	(France)
1998
Cabaret Balkan	Bure Baruta	Goran Paskaljević	Goran Paskaljević, Antoine de Clermont-Tonnerre	(Federal Republic of Yugoslavia)	(France) (Greece) (North Macedonia) (Turkey)
1999
Farewell, Home Sweet Home	Adieu Plancher des Vaches	Otar Iosseliani	Martine Marignac	(France)	(Switzerland) (Italy)

=== 2000s ===
English title	Original title	Director(s)	Producer(s)	Country of production	Country of co-production
2000
Clouds of May	Mayıs Sıkıntısı	Nuri Bilge Ceylan	Sadik Incesu	(Turkey)	
2001
The Town Is Quiet	La Ville est tranquille	Robert Guédiguian	Robert Guédiguian, Michel Saint-Jean, Gilles Sandoz	(France)	
2002
Sweet Sixteen		Ken Loach	Rebecca O'Brien	(United Kingdom)	(Spain) (Germany)
2003
Goodmorning, Night	Buongiorno, notte	Marco Bellocchio	Marco Bellocchio, Sergio Pelone	(Italy)	
2005
Hidden	Caché	Michael Haneke	Veit Heiduschka	(France)	(Austria) (Germany) (United States) (Italy)
2006
Regular Lovers	Les amants réguliers	Philippe Garrel	Gilles Sandoz	(France)	
2007
Private Fears in Public Places	Cœurs	Alain Resnais	Bruno Pésery	(France)	(Italy)
2008
The Secret of the Grain	La graine et le mulet	Abdellatif Kechiche	Benoît Pilot	(France)	(Tunisia)
2009
Sweet Rush	Tatarak	Andrzej Wajda	Michał Kwieciński	(Poland)	
