= Fool Moon (film) =

2016 film

- Film poster
- La Forêt de Quinconces
- Directed by: Grégoire Leprince-Ringuet
- Written by: Grégoire Leprince-Ringuet
- Produced by: Paulo Branco
- Starring: Grégoire Leprince-Ringuet; Pauline Caupenne; Amandine Truffy
- Cinematography: David Chambille
- Edited by: Nathalie Sanchez
- Music by: Clément Doumic
- Production companies: Alfama Films; Arte France Cinéma
- Distributed by: Alfama Films
- Release dates: 17 May 2016 (Cannes); 22 June 2016 (France)
- Running time: 109 minutes
- Country: France
- Language: French

Fool Moon (original title: La Forêt de Quinconces) is a 2016 French romantic drama film written and directed by Grégoire Leprince-Ringuet and produced by Paulo Branco. It was selected to screen in the Special Screenings section of the 2016 Cannes Film Festival.

== Cast ==
- Grégoire Leprince-Ringuet as Paul
- Pauline Caupenne as Camille
- Amandine Truffy as Ondine
- Marilyne Canto as Ève
- Antoine Chappey as Bruno
- Thierry Hancisse as the clochard
- Héloïse Godet as Ondine's friend
