= A Common Thread =

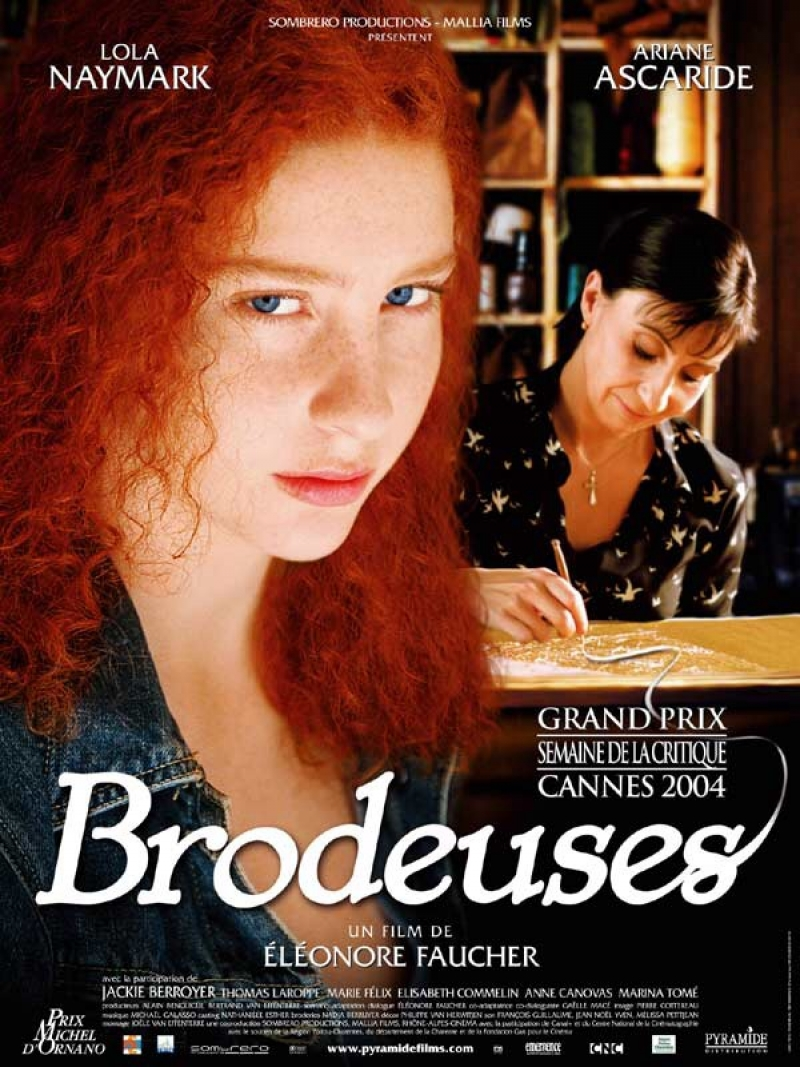
- Original film poster
- Directed by: Éléonore Faucher
- Written by: Éléonore Faucher, Gaëlle Macé
- Produced by: Alain Benguigui, Bertrand Van Effenterre
- Starring: Lola Naymark, Ariane Ascaride; Jackie Berroyer
- Cinematography: Pierre Cottereau
- Music by: Michael Galasso
- Distributed by: New Yorker Films (USA)
- Release date: 14 May 2004
- Running time: 89 minutes
- Languages: French; Armenian
- Budget: $1,6 million
- Box office: $2,421,930

A Common Thread (Brodeuses) is a 2004 French film directed by Éléonore Faucher. The film is known as Sequins in the United States.

The film won "Critics Week Grand Prize" and "SACD Screenwriting Award" at the 2004 Cannes Film Festival, as well as the main prize at the New Horizons Film Festival. It is also nominated for "European Discovery of the Year" at the 2004 European Film Awards.

== Plot ==
When Claire (played by Lola Naymark) learns that she is five months pregnant at the age of seventeen, she decides to keep the baby and not to tell the father (who seems to be married). Instead, she quits her current job at a local supermarket and goes to work as an assistant for Madame Mélikian (Ariane Ascaride), an embroiderer for haute couture. Mélikian has just lost her only son in a motorcycle accident. Claire shows her willingness in taking her duties, as well as taking over Mélikian's private order when she is treated in the hospital.

== Cast ==
- Lola Naymark - Claire Moutiers
- Ariane Ascaride - Mme. Mélikian
- Marie Félix - Lucile
- Thomas Laroppe - Guillaume
- Arthur Quehen - Thomas
- Jackie Berroyer - M Lescuyer (as Jacky Berroyer)
- Anne Canovas - Mme. Lescuyer
- Marina Tomé - Gynecologist
- Elisabeth Commelin - Mme. Moutiers
- Christophe Hatey - Butcher
- François Noël - Bike Guy
- Yasmine Modestine - Nurse
- Annie-Claude Sauton - Baker
- Nathalie Kirzin - Round Woman
- Ludivine Morissonaud - Clotilde
- Mark Valladolid - Jose Dela Cruz
- Maria Aiza Nares - Sisang

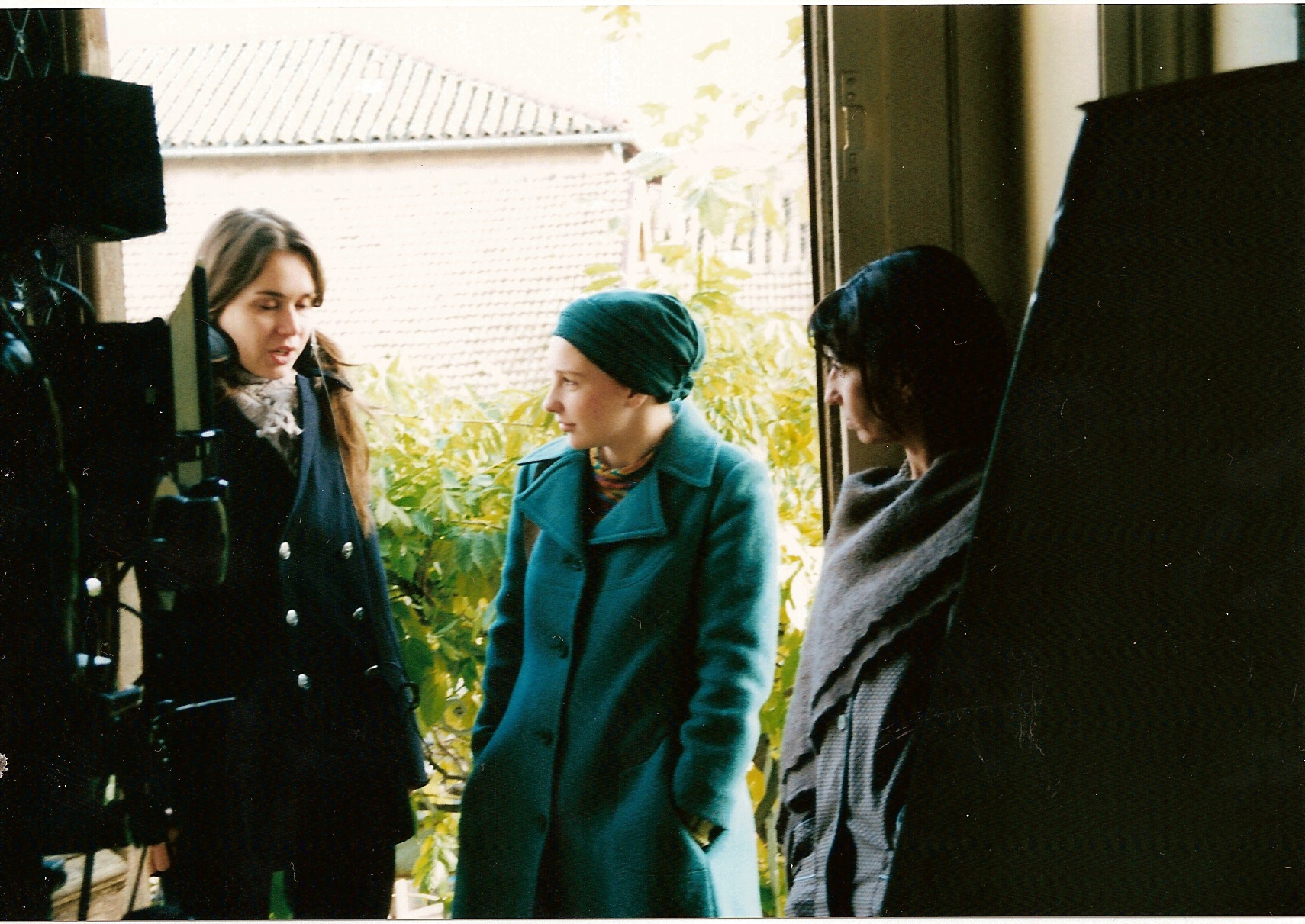
On the set of A Common Thread in Fleurie.

== Reception ==
"Whether the action involves gutting a live eel or stitching opalescent sequins to gossamer cloth, the camera is deployed with wisdom". Lisa Nesselson, Variety

"A Common Thread is as delicate as the intricate needlework that both women are so passionate about". Louise Keller, Urban Cinefile

Set in the picturesque French countryside A Common Thread is a touching, thought-provoking drama about the bond that forms between two women. Lola Naymark illuminates the screen with her striking, flame-red curls and eye-catching performance.
