= Jimmy Tavares =

French figure skater and actor (born 1984)

Jimmy Tavares (born November 20, 1984) is a French figure skater and actor. He starred in the 2002 film Ma vraie vie à Rouen (released in the United States in 2003 with the title My Life on Ice). In his debut film role, Tavares plays the character of Etienne, a teenager who lives in Rouen, France and is training to take part in the French national figure skating championship. As a 16th birthday gift, his grandmother gives him a digital camcorder, and he begins immediately to record the people and events around him.

Tavares has toured with several productions of Holiday on Ice throughout France and other countries in Europe, including Peter Pan and Bugs Bunny on Ice.
