= Grégoire Leprince-Ringuet =

French actor, film director and screenwriter

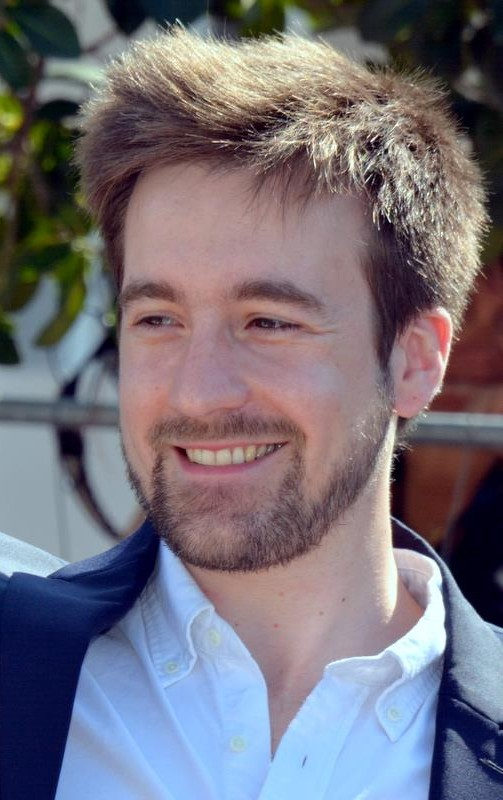
- Leprince-Ringuet at the 2016 Cannes Film Festival
- Born: 4 December 1987 (age 38); Normandy, France
- Occupations: Actor, film director, screenwriter
- Years active: 2003–present

Grégoire Leprince-Ringuet (born 4 December 1987) is a French actor, film director and screenwriter.

== Career ==
=== Theatre ===
Between 1998 and 2002, he was a member of the chorus at the Opéra National de Paris.

=== Film ===
Leprince-Ringuet has been nominated for César awards on three occasions. He is known for his role in Christophe Honoré's film Les Chansons d'amour and the French-Moroccan War-horror film Djinns. He was also in La Belle Personne as Otto.

He made his debut as director with Fool Moon, a romance drama, which was selected to screen in the Special Screenings section at the 2016 Cannes Film Festival.

== Filmography ==
=== As actor ===
Year	Title	Role	Notes
2003	Strayed (Les Égarés)	Philippe	Nominated—César Award for Most Promising Actor. Directed by André Téchiné.
2005	Poor Relatives	Marc-Yves	Russian film
2005	Le Frangin d'Amérique	Antoine	Telefilm
2005	Frappes interdites	Kévin Lefort	Telefilm
2006	Charlie Says (Selon Charlie)	Thierry	
2006	The Cheese Topping Dish (Le Plat à gratin)	Laurent	Short
2007	Love Songs (Les Chansons d'amour)	Erwann	Nominated—César Award for Most Promising Actor. First film directed by Christophe Honoré.
2007	In the Arms of My Enemy (Voleurs de chevaux)	Vladimir	
2007	La Vie d'artiste	Frédéric	
2007	La Vie sera Belle	Lucien Laclos	Telefilm
2008	The Beautiful Person (La Belle Personne)	Otto Clèves	Nominated—César Award for Most Promising Actor. Second film for Christophe Honoré.
2008	Folles d'Adam	Adam	Short film
2009	The Army of Crime (L'Armée du crime)	Thomas Elek	First film for Robert Guédiguian
2009	Réfractaire	François	
2010	Dimanche matin	Stéphane	Short film
2010	The Piano Tuner	Adrien	Short film
2010	The Princess of Montpensier	Philippe, Prince of Montpensier	Nominated—César Award for Most Promising Actor
2010	Black Heaven (L'Autre monde)	Gaspard	
2010	Djinns	Michel	
2010	Roses à crédit	Daniel	Telefilm
2011	Inaperçu	The young man	Short film
2011	The Snows of Kilimanjaro (Les Neiges du Kilimandjaro)	Christophe	Second film for Robert Guédiguian.
2011	Week-End	Damien	Short film
2012	The Fortieth Step		Short film
2012	An Inventory		Short film; voice role
2012	Black Really Suits You (Le noir (te) vous va si bien)	Richard	
2013	The Jewish Cardinal	Father Julien	Telefilm
2014	La Clinique du Docteur Blanche	Jules	Telefilm
2015	Les Fusillés	Louis	Telefilm
2015	Don't Tell Me the Boy Was Mad (Une histoire de fou)	Gilles Teissier	Third film for Robert Guédiguian.
2015	A Uma Hora Incerta	Boris	Portuguese film
2016	Fool Moon (La Forêt de Quinconces)	Paul	Also writer and director.
2017	Golden Years (Nos années folles)	Charles de Lauzin	Second film for André Téchiné.
2017	Memoir of War (La Douleur)	Morland (François Mitterrand)	
2019	Gloria Mundi	Bruno	Fourth film for Robert Guédiguian.
2021	The French Dispatch	TV reporter	
2023	A Difficult Year (Une année difficile)		
2026	A Woman Today	Christian	

=== As filmmaker ===
Year	Title	Credited as		Notes
Year	Title	Director	Screenwriter	Notes
2016	Fool Moon	Yes	Yes	
