= The Return of Casanova =

1992 film

- Film poster
- Directed by: Édouard Niermans
- Screenplay by: Jean-Claude Carrière
- Based on: Casanova's Homecoming by Arthur Schnitzler
- Produced by: Alain Delon
- Starring: Alain Delon; Elsa Lunghini; Fabrice Luchini
- Cinematography: Jean Penzer
- Edited by: Yves Deschamps
- Music by: Michel Portal; Bruno Coulais
- Distributed by: AMLF
- Release date: 13 May 1992
- Running time: 93 minutes
- Country: France
- Language: French
- Box office: 356,908 admissions (France)

The Return of Casanova (French: Le Retour de Casanova) is a 1992 French period drama film directed by Édouard Niermans, and based on Arthur Schnitzler's novella Casanova's Homecoming. It was entered into the 1992 Cannes Film Festival.

== Plot ==
After many years of rambling across Europe, the aging Giacomo Casanova is impoverished. He wants to return to the Republic of Venice but he doesn't dare going there directly because he was a fugitive when he left. While he tries to find a way to get a pardon, he meets a young lady named Marcolina. The more he shows his affection, the more ostentatiously she rejects him. Even so he doesn't give up on her because her lover Lorenzi has grave gaming debts. In return for the required money, Lorenzi tells Casanova about a looming secret rendezvous with Marcolina. Moreover, he lets Casanova take his place. Under cover of the night, Casanova finally seduces her. Lorenzi later feels his honour was besmirched and demands satisfaction. Casanova kills him in a duel and then goes home to Venice.

== Cast ==
- Alain Delon as Casanova
- Fabrice Luchini as Camille
- Elsa Lunghini (as Elsa) as Marcolina
- Wadeck Stanczak as Lorenzi
- Delia Boccardo as Amelie
- Gilles Arbona as Olivo
- Violetta Sanchez as Marquise
- Jacques Boudet as Abbé
- Philippe Leroy as the emissary
- Alain Cuny as Marquis
- Yveline Ailhaud as the female cook
- Sarah Bertrand as the first woman
- Rachel Bizet as Marie
- Sandrine Blancke as Teresina
- Sophie Bouilloux as Lise
- Gabriel Dupont as the coachman
