= Type:Rider =

2013 video game

- Developer(s): Agat Films & Cie – Ex Nihilo
- Publisher(s): Bulkypix; Arte
- Platform(s): Microsoft Windows; PlayStation 4; PlayStation Vita; Android; iOS; Nintendo Switch
- Release: iOS, Android: WW: October 10, 2013; Microsoft Windows: WW: November 6, 2013; PlayStation Vita, PlayStation 4: WW: July 12, 2016; Nintendo Switch: WW: April 25, 2019
- Genre(s): Platformer; Puzzle
- Mode(s): Single-player

Type:Rider is a video game developed by Agat Films & Cie – Ex Nihilo and published by Bulkypix and Arte. It was released in for Microsoft Windows, Android, and iOS in 2013, for PlayStation 4 and PlayStation Vita in 2016, and for Nintendo Switch in April 2019.

The game won the award for Artistic Consistency at the 2013 European Indie Game Days.

== Gameplay ==
Type:Rider is a puzzle-platform video game in which the player controls a colon punctuation mark through ten worlds based on existing typefaces from different eras. The game starts with cave paintings, then progresses to actual typefaces such as Garamond, Baskerville and Helvetica, with the final level revolving around digital fonts.

The colon can roll and jump in order to collect letters from each of the ten fonts as well as collectables such as asterisks and ampersands. Each era features pieces of arts that characterised them as well as its own soundtrack.

== Reception ==
Reception

Aggregate score
| Aggregator | Score |
|---|---|
| Metacritic | iOS: 83/100; Switch: 67/100 |

Review scores
| Publication | Score |
|---|---|
| Eurogamer | 8/10 |
| Pocket Gamer | 3.5/5 |
| TouchArcade | 4.5/5 |

Review aggregator Metacritic gave the iOS version of Type:Rider a score of 83 out of 100 based on 13 reviews from critics, while the Switch version received a score of 66.

Eurogamer awarded the game with a score of 8 out of 10, praising how it manages to offer a combination of the style of Limbo and the challenges of the Trials series while also providing a framework for educating the player about the history of typography. Pocket Gamer gave the game a score of 3.5/5, commenting positively on the originality of the settings, but reporting the presence of a "few niggling problems".

Despite having identified a few technical-related issues, TouchArcade described Type:Rider as a "intricately-designed masterpiece".
