= Sand and Blood =

1988 film

- Directed by: Jeanne Labrune
- Written by: Jeanne Labrune
- Produced by: Jean Nainchrik
- Starring: Sami Frey
- Cinematography: André Neau
- Edited by: Nadine Fischer
- Release date: 4 May 1988
- Running time: 101 minutes
- Country: France
- Language: French

Sand and Blood (French: De sable et de sang) is a 1988 French drama film directed by Jeanne Labrune. It was screened in the Un Certain Regard section at the 1988 Cannes Film Festival.

== Cast ==
- Sami Frey - Manuel Vasquez
- André Dussollier - Francisco Jimenez
- Clémentine Célarié - Marion
- María Casares - Dolores
- Catherine Rouvel - Carmina
- Pierre Forget - Le Père
- Camille Grandville - Annie
- Stéphane Albouy - Mario
