= Lola Naymark =

French actress (born 1987)

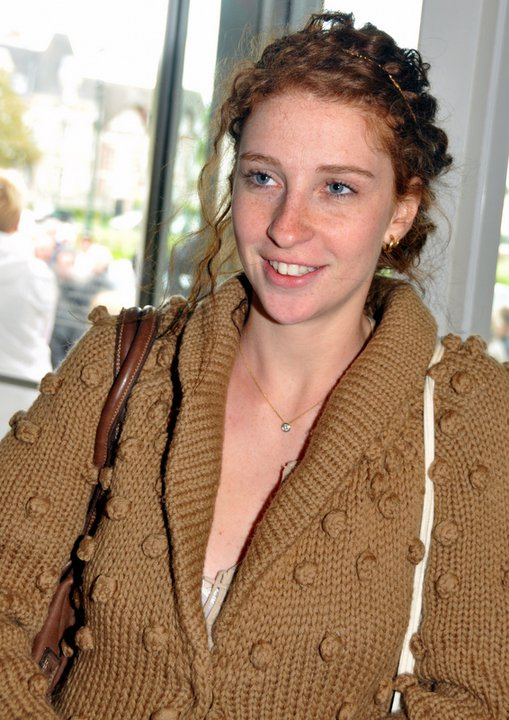
- Naymark in 2011
- Born: 5 April 1987 (age 39); Paris, France
- Occupations: Actress, writer, director
- Years active: 1996–present

Lola Naymark (born 5 April 1987) is a French film and television actress, writer, and director. In 2005 she was nominated for the César Award for Most Promising Actress for her role in A Common Thread but lost to Sara Forestier.

== Early and personal life ==
Besides her native French and English; Naymark can also speak Hebrew, Spanish and Dutch.

== Selected filmography ==
- Riches, belles, etc. (1998)
- Monsieur Ibrahim (2003)
- A Common Thread (2004)
- The Army of Crime (2009)
- Brèves de comptoir (2014)
- Au fil d'Ariane [Ariane's Thread] (2014)
- Casanova Variations (2014)
- Don't Tell Me the Boy Was Mad (2015)
- Gloria Mundi (2019)
- Le Tigre et le Président (2022)
- A Woman Today (2026)

== Bibliography ==
- Janis L. Pallister & Ruth A. Hottell. Noteworthy Francophone Women Directors: A Sequel. Lexington Books, 2011.
