= Don't Tell Me the Boy Was Mad =

- Film poster
- Directed by: Robert Guédiguian
- Written by: Robert Guédiguian; Gilles Taurand
- Based on: La Bomba by José Antonio Gurriarán
- Produced by: Robert Guédiguian
- Starring: Simon Abkarian; Ariane Ascaride; Grégoire Leprince-Ringuet; Syrus Shahidi
- Cinematography: Pierre Milon
- Edited by: Bernard Sasia
- Music by: Alexandre Desplat
- Production companies: Agat Films & Cie; France 3 Cinéma
- Distributed by: Diaphana Distribution
- Release dates: 20 May 2015 (Cannes); 11 November 2015 (France)
- Running time: 134 minutes
- Country: France
- Language: French
- Budget: $6.4 million
- Box office: $912.000

Don't Tell Me the Boy Was Mad (French title: Une histoire de fou) is a 2015 French drama film produced and directed by Robert Guédiguian, co-written by Guédiguian and Gilles Taurand, loosely based on the autobiography La Bomba by Spanish journalist José Antonio Gurriarán, who was left in a semi-paralyzed state after a bomb attack by the Armenian Secret Army for the Liberation of Armenia in Madrid in 1981.

The film had is world premiere in the Special Screenings section of the 2015 Cannes Film Festival on 20 May 2015. It was theatrically released in France on 11 November 2015 by Diaphana Distribution.

== Plot ==
Berlin - 1921. Soghomon Tehlirian, who survived the 1915 Armenian genocide, guns down Talaat Pasha, one of those implicated. His court case and acquittal would turn out to be a key moment in the struggle for recognition of the crime which had been denied by the Turkish government.

Marseille - 1970s. Hovannès et Anouch are making a living from their small grocery shop, their son Aram leaves home to join militants based in Paris who are committed to using violent ends to achieve their ends. Aram and Anahit are chosen to assassinate the Turkish ambassador in France. Gilles, an innocent passer-by, loses the use of both legs in the attack. Aram and Anahit flee to Beirut for an ASALA training camp run by Vrej. Anouch is horrified by events and visits Gilles in hospital who is unaware of the history of Armenians. The fanaticism of Vrej causes split and Aram leaves while Anahit remains as a supporter of Vrej. Anouch convinces Aram to meet Gilles in Beirut. The two men are reconciled, but Haïk is planning to shoot Aram. Over time Gilles and Anouch keep in touch and he accompanies her to Armenia to scatter the ashes of her mother.

== Cast ==
- Simon Abkarian as Hovannès
- Ariane Ascaride as Anouch
- Grégoire Leprince-Ringuet as Gilles (based on José Antonio Gurriarán)
- Syrus Shahidi as Aram
- Razane Jammal as Anahit
- Robinson Stévenin as Soghomon Tehlirian
- Siro Fazilian as Arsinée
- Amir Abou El Kacem as Vahé
- Rania Mellouli as Nounée
- Hrayr Kalemkerian as Haïk
- Rodney Haddad as Vrej
- Lola Naymark as Valérie
- Serge Avedikian as Armenak
- Omar Mikati as Narguiz
- Yann Trégouët : officer of the Direction de la Surveillance du territoire
- Adrien Jolivet : the French journalist in Berlin

== Background ==
Working with some of his regular collaborators, Ascaride, Naymark, Abkarian, Leprince-Ringuet; Trégouët and Jolivert, Guédiguian uses their presence in classic cinema to approach "ever more thorny subjects"; for this film, which begins in black and white, he goes further with the subject of the guilt of Tehlihrian. A quote from the Israeli writer David Grossman is shown on screen to convey something key to the director's approach: the most important moments in history do not occur on the field of battle, or in palaces, but in the kitchen, or a child's room. The switch of time period to the 1970s and 80s is marked by transition to colour film. The result is an attempt by Guédiguian (himself of Armenian origin) to explain these horrors. He also suggests that the only means of healing is through raising awareness of past events and an attempt at understanding them.
