= Marie-Jo and Her Two Lovers =

2002 film

- Film poster
- Directed by: Robert Guédiguian
- Written by: Robert Guédiguian; Jean-Louis Milesi
- Produced by: Robert Guédiguian
- Starring: Ariane Ascaride
- Cinematography: Renato Berta
- Edited by: Bernard Sasia
- Distributed by: Diaphana Films
- Release dates: 16 May 2002 (Cannes); 26 June 2002 (France)
- Running time: 124 minutes
- Country: France
- Language: French
- Budget: €3.4 million
- Box office: $2.7 million

Marie-Jo and Her Two Lovers (French: Marie-Jo et ses deux amours) is a 2002 French drama film directed by Robert Guédiguian. It was entered into the 2002 Cannes Film Festival.

== Cast ==
- Ariane Ascaride as Marie-Jo
- Jean-Pierre Darroussin as Daniel
- Gérard Meylan as Marco
- Julie-Marie Parmentier as Julie
- Jacques Boudet as Jean-Christophe
- Yann Trégouët as Sylvain
- Frédérique Bonnal as Mrs. Fauvelet
- Souhade Temimi as La collègue de Marie-Jo
- Maya Seuleyvan as La dame à la minerve (as Maya Sevleyan)
- Frédéric Garbe as Le toubib
- Danielle Stefan as L'invitée à la fête
- Jacques Germain as Le pilote
- Axel Köhler as Le commandant allemand (as Alex Koehler)

== Accolades ==
Award / Film Festival	Category	Recipients and nominees	Result
Cannes Film Festival	Palme d'Or		Nominated
César Awards	Best Actress	Ariane Ascaride	Nominated
European Film Awards	Jameson People's Choice Award for Best Actress	Ariane Ascaride	Nominated
