= The Town Is Quiet =

2000 film

- Directed by: Robert Guédiguian
- Starring: Ariane Ascaride; Jean-Pierre Darroussin
- Release dates: 30 August 2000 (VIFF); 17 January 2001 (France)
- Running time: 133 minutes
- Country: France
- Language: French
- Budget: $2.3 million
- Box office: $2.3 million

The Town Is Quiet (French: La ville est tranquille) is a 2000 French drama film directed by Robert Guédiguian.

== Cast ==
- Ariane Ascaride - Michèle
- Jean-Pierre Darroussin - Paul
- Gérard Meylan - Gérard
- Jacques Boudet - Paul's Father
- Christine Brücher - Viviane Froment
- Jacques Pieiller - Yves Froment
- Pascale Roberts - Paul's Mother
- Julie-Marie Parmentier - Fiona
- Pierre Banderet - Claude
