= Ariane's Thread =

2014 film

- Film poster
- Directed by: Robert Guédiguian
- Written by: Robert Guédiguian; Serge Valletti
- Produced by: Marc Bordure; Robert Guédiguian
- Starring: Ariane Ascaride; Jacques Boudet; Jean-Pierre Darroussin; Anaïs Demoustier; Gérard Meylan
- Cinematography: Pierre Milon
- Edited by: Armelle Mahé; Bernard Sasia
- Music by: Eduardo Makaroff; Christoph Müller
- Production companies: Agat Films & Cie; Chaocorp
- Distributed by: Diaphana Films
- Release date: 18 June 2014
- Running time: 92 minutes
- Country: France
- Language: French

Ariane's Thread (French: Au fil d'Ariane) is a 2014 French comedy-drama film (described by the director as a 'fantaisie') directed by Robert Guédiguian and written by Guédiguian and Serge Valletti.

== Cast ==
- Ariane Ascaride as Ariane
- Jacques Boudet as Jack
- Jean-Pierre Darroussin as Taxi Driver / Stage Director
- Anaïs Demoustier as Martine / Actress
- Youssouf Djaoro as Night Watchman
- Adrien Jolivet as Raphaël
- Gérard Meylan as Denis
- Lola Naymark as Lola
- Judith Magre as The Turtle (voice)

== Plot summary ==
It is Ariane's birthday and she finds herself alone in her quiet home. Everything is ready for a party but the guests are not there. She gets in her car and sets off for the city. At the harbour bridge she meets a young man Raphaël on a scooter who takes her to a seaside restaurant run by Denis. Raphaël abandons her for his girlfriend Lola, so she calls a taxi to go back to where she had left her car but it has been towed away. After going to an ATM to get money to pay the taxi driver she is robbed. She gets back to the beach restaurant and gets to know customer Jacques and the watchman Marcial; she is taken on to work at the café. The day sees further adventures... but with a happy ending.

== Background ==
Robert Guédiguian admitted to several references for the film, including Pier Paolo Pasolini (the first text read by Jack on the necessity of myths), Anton Chekhov (the text on the eternal beauty of the world), Brecht (the song 'Comme on fait son lit, on se couche') as well as poet Aragon and song-writer Jean Ferrat. He also wanted to pay tribute to several strands of cinema: Drôle de drame (Carné and Prévert), Vivre sa vie (Godard), Fellini's La Dolce Vita with the fountain scene, to Pier Paolo Pasolini (the pilgrims who arrive as in his Gospel of Saint Matthew).

== Reception ==
Ronnie Scheib of Variety had this to say: "While 'Ariane’s Thread' evokes the poetic realism of the 1930s French populist cinema of Feydeau, Prévert, Vigo and early Renoir, it does so less in terms of an organic visual style and more in terms of its expression of a shared ethos." Jerome Cabanel, writing for The Hollywood Reporter, considered "Yet while there aren’t too many rewards offered at the end of the maze [], there’s something pleasurable in soaking in the warm atmosphere and touching characters, with the director’s trusty cast indulging in a series of easygoing conversations and playful bickering []."
