= Jeanne Labrune =

French film director and screenwriter

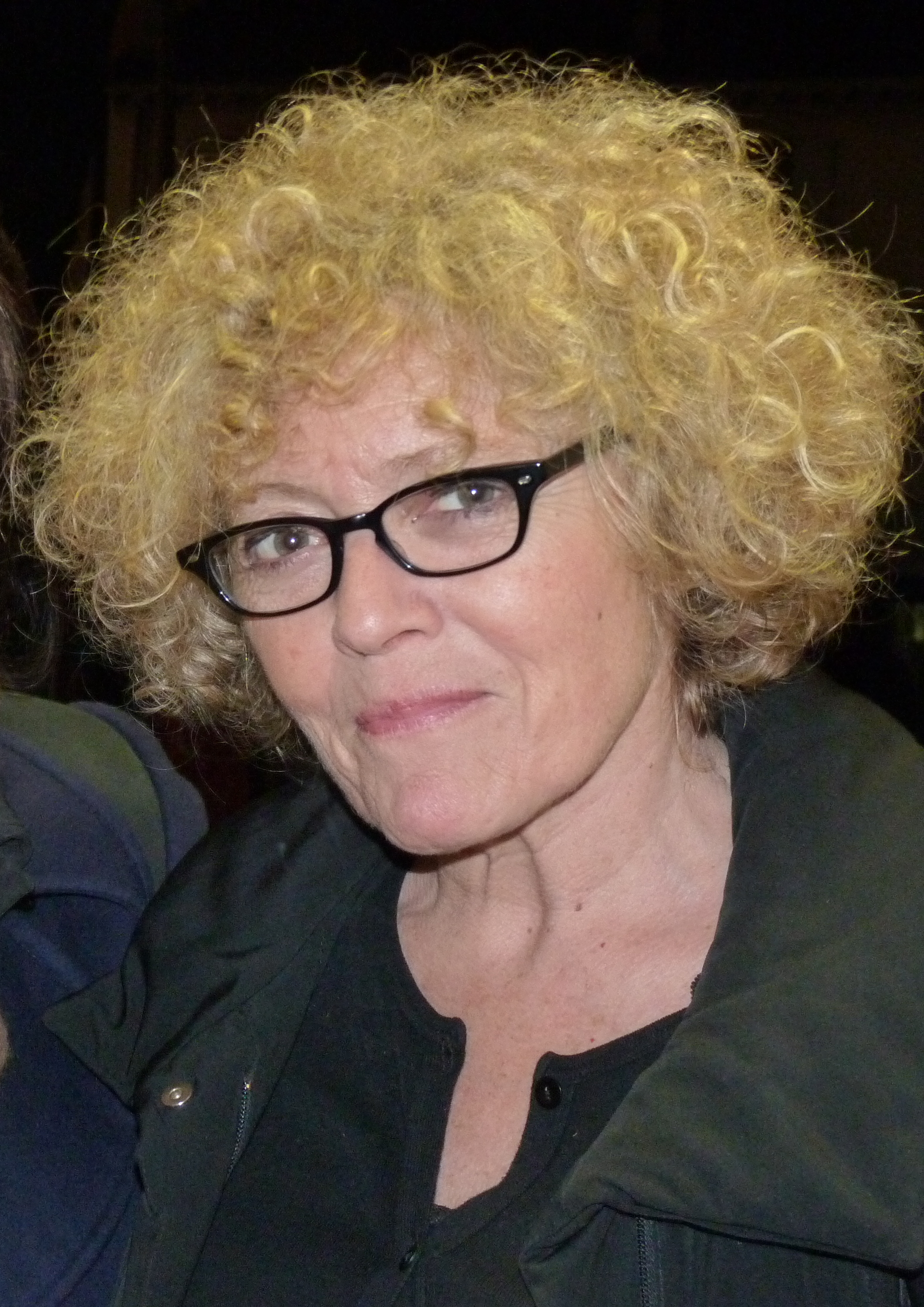
- Jeanne Labrune in 2012
- Born: 21 June 1950 (age 75); Berry-Bouy, France
- Occupations: Screenwriter, film director
- Years active: 1978–present

Jeanne Labrune (born 21 June 1950) is a French screenwriter and film director. She has directed 13 films since 1978. Her film Sand and Blood was screened in the Un Certain Regard section at the 1988 Cannes Film Festival.

== Filmography ==
=== Filmmaker ===
- Fenêtres (1978)
- Les prédateurs (1982)
- La digue (1984)
- La part de l'autre (1987)
- Sand and Blood (1988)
- Correspondance privée sur un lieu public (1988)
- Les jardins du paroxysme (1990)
- Sans un cri (1992)
- Jules et Jim (1995)
- Si je t'aime, prends garde à toi (1998)
- Tomorrow's Another Day (2000)
- Special Delivery (2002)
- Cause toujours! (2004)
- Special Treatment (2010)
- Le chemin (2017)

=== Writer ===
- Vatel (2000)
