= Lady Jane (2008 film) =

- Film poster
- Directed by: Robert Guédiguian
- Written by: Jean-Louis Milesi; Robert Guédiguian
- Produced by: Robert Guédiguian
- Starring: Ariane Ascaride; Jean-Pierre Darroussin; Gérard Meylan
- Cinematography: Pierre Milon
- Edited by: Bernard Sasia
- Production companies: Agat Films & Cie; France 3
- Distributed by: Diaphana Films
- Release dates: 13 February 2008 (Berlin); 9 April 2008 (France)
- Running time: 102 minutes
- Country: France
- Language: French
- Budget: $3.3 million
- Box office: $1.8 million

Lady Jane is a 2008 French film directed by Robert Guédiguian, starring Ariane Ascaride, Jean-Pierre Darroussin and Gérard Meylan.

== Summary ==
In their youth Muriel, François and René formed a gang of thieves who worked along the lines of Robin Hood, handing out their loot in the poorer districts of Marseilles. As the film opens, Muriel is a single mother bringing up her 15-year-old son Martin while running her own perfume shop 'Lady Jane'. One day Martin is abducted. To pay the ransom, Muriel calls on François and René, whom she has not seen for twenty years.

René is now a night-club owner and François has a boat firm. To recover the necessary money, François scams from trafficking clients. He and René go with Muriel to the rendez-vous, where they find no one, but later in the car park Muriel finds Martin, who is immediately shot in the head in front of her eyes. Struck down by this unbelievable event, Muriel asks the other to leave her alone, but François, still in love with her, keeps an eye on her. They discover the murderer, a young man with a family, and they kidnap him. The man explains that he acted in vengeance for the death of his father, a broker whom Muriel had killed in cold blood and which he had witnessed; an act which had resulted in the three thieves separating. She herself had acted out of vengeance for the death of her father, caused by the broker. Muriel determines to put an end to this cycle of vengeance and violence by not killing the murderer of her son. She goes off to a concert where Martin would have gone.

== Cast ==
- Ariane Ascaride as Muriel
- Jean-Pierre Darroussin as François
- Gérard Meylan as René
- Yann Trégouët as Young Man
- Frédérique Bonnal as Charlotte, wife of François
- Pascale Roberts as Solange
- Jacques Boudet as Henri
- Pascal Cervo as Lieutenant
- Giuseppe Selimo as Martin, Muriel's 15-year-old son
- Anna Ostby as Marly
- Pierre Banderet as the bistrot manager
