= Édouard Niermans (director) =

French film director

- Born: 10 November 1943 (age 82); Paris, France
- Occupations: Film director, screenwriter, actor
- Years active: 1969-present

Édouard Niermans (born 10 November 1943) is a French film director, screenwriter and actor. His film The Return of Casanova was entered into the 1992 Cannes Film Festival.

== Selected filmography ==
- Anthracite (1980)
- Killing Time (1987)
- The Return of Casanova (1992)
- Le Septième Juré (2008)
