= The Army of Crime =

2009 film

- 2009 poster advertising the French release
- Directed by: Robert Guédiguian
- Written by: Robert Guédiguian; Serge Le Péron; Gilles Taurand
- Produced by: Dominique Barneaud
- Starring: Virginie Ledoyen; Simon Abkarian
- Cinematography: Pierre Milon
- Edited by: Bernard Sasia
- Music by: Alexandre Desplat
- Distributed by: StudioCanal
- Release dates: 17 May 2009 (Cannes); 16 September 2009 (France)
- Running time: 139 minutes
- Country: France
- Language: French
- Budget: $9.2 million
- Box office: $4.4 million

The Army of Crime (French: L'Armée du crime) is a 2009 French drama-war film directed by Robert Guédiguian and based on a story by Serge Le Péron, who is also one of three credited for the screenplay. It received a wide release in France on 16 September 2009 and opened in the United States in 2010.

The film deals with the development of the Manouchian Group, a 23-member resistance unit led by an Armenian exile. They were captured in 1944, tried by a German military court and executed. The title of the film was taken from a propaganda poster known as L'Affiche Rouge (red poster), in which the Nazis sought to present these French Resistance fighters as foreign criminals. The caption read "Liberators? Liberation by the army of crime".

== Plot ==
In Paris during the German occupation, resistance movements develop, including some by migrants. An ill-assorted group of resistance fighters commits disorganized attacks. Missak Manouchian, an Armenian exile, is ready to help but is reluctant to kill; for him, being ready to die but not to kill is an ethical matter but circumstances lead him to drop his reluctance. Under his leadership, the 23-member group better plans its actions and develops as what was known as the Manouchian Group. It was part of a network of 100 resistance fighters in Paris that carried out most of the acts of armed resistance in 1943. The film traces the history of this group, from its formation to the arrest, trial by a German military court and execution of its members in 1944.

Trying to respond to public anger about the executions and discredit the resistance fighters, the Vichy government distributed and put up thousands of posters, known as L'Affiche rouge because of the red background, with photos of ten of the men and data about their backgrounds, to portray the migrants as terrorists and criminals. The public wrote Morts pour La France (Died for France) across the posters, the phrase officially commemorating soldiers who die in combat. They also left flowers in tribute.

== Cast ==
- Virginie Ledoyen as Mélinée Manouchian
- Simon Abkarian as Missak Manouchian
- Robinson Stévenin as Marcel Rayman
- Jean-Pierre Darroussin as Inspecteur Pujol
- Lola Naymark as Monique Stern
- Ariane Ascaride as Madame Elek
- Grégoire Leprince-Ringuet as Thomas Elek
- Yann Trégouët as Le Commissaire David
- Ivan Franek as Feri Boczov
- Olga Legrand as Olga Bancic
- Boris Bergman as Monsieur Rayman
- Patrick Bonnel as Monsieur Elek
- Adrien Jolivet as Henri Krasucki
- Pascal Cervo as Bourlier
- Gérard Meylan as Inspecteur Mathelin
- Horațiu Mălăele as Monsieur Dupont
- Lucas Belvaux as Gilles

== Reception ==
=== Box office ===
Opening in 250 screens, The Army of Crime debuted at number 7 at the French box office, making it the second-highest grossing new release of that week following District 9, which debuted at the number one spot with almost twice as many screens. The film grossed over €772,000 in its first five days of release and attracted 349,940 viewers to French theaters.

=== Critical response ===
It was screened out of competition at the 2009 Cannes Film Festival on 17 May 2009. On Rotten Tomatoes, the film has a rating of 90% based on 30 reviews and an average rating of 6.8/10. At Metacritic, the film has a score of 76 out of 100 based on 9 reviews, indicating "generally favorable reviews".

The film received largely positive reviews from French critics, with the website AlloCiné awarding it a score of 3.52 out of 5.00 based on twenty-five major reviews. Positif's Jean A. Gili praised the film as "spectacular", while Libération's Didier Péron lamented the fact that the director seemed "paralyzed with respect" toward his subject, praising the young cast for its efforts in making the film seem fresh. In Paris Match, Alain Spira said the film suffered from classicism and that emotion had trouble reaching the audience. In Première, Véronique Le Bris criticized the time taken to introduce the various characters. In one of the more negative reviews, Pierre Murat wrote for Télérama that while respectful, the film was insignificant and looked like a TV movie.

The Army of Crime fared well with international critics, with the website Screenrush awarding it a score of four out of five based on six major British reviews. Peter Brunette of The Hollywood Reporter wrote a positive review after seeing the film at Cannes, saying, "Though it drags here and there and is a bit flat in places, the film is solidly made and for the most part quite involving". In The Independent, Anthony Quinn described the film as "sombre and gripping," while Dave Calhoun wrote in Time Out that the film is "always fascinating". In some of the worst reviews, The Sun compared the film to Inglourious Basterds, stating that Tarantino's film was "a lot more fun," and The Financial Times's Nigel Andrews mused that it felt "like every resistance movie you have ever seen".

== Home media ==
The Army of Crime was released in France on DVD and Blu-ray Disc on 19 January 2010.
