= Robinson Stévenin =

French actor (born 1981)

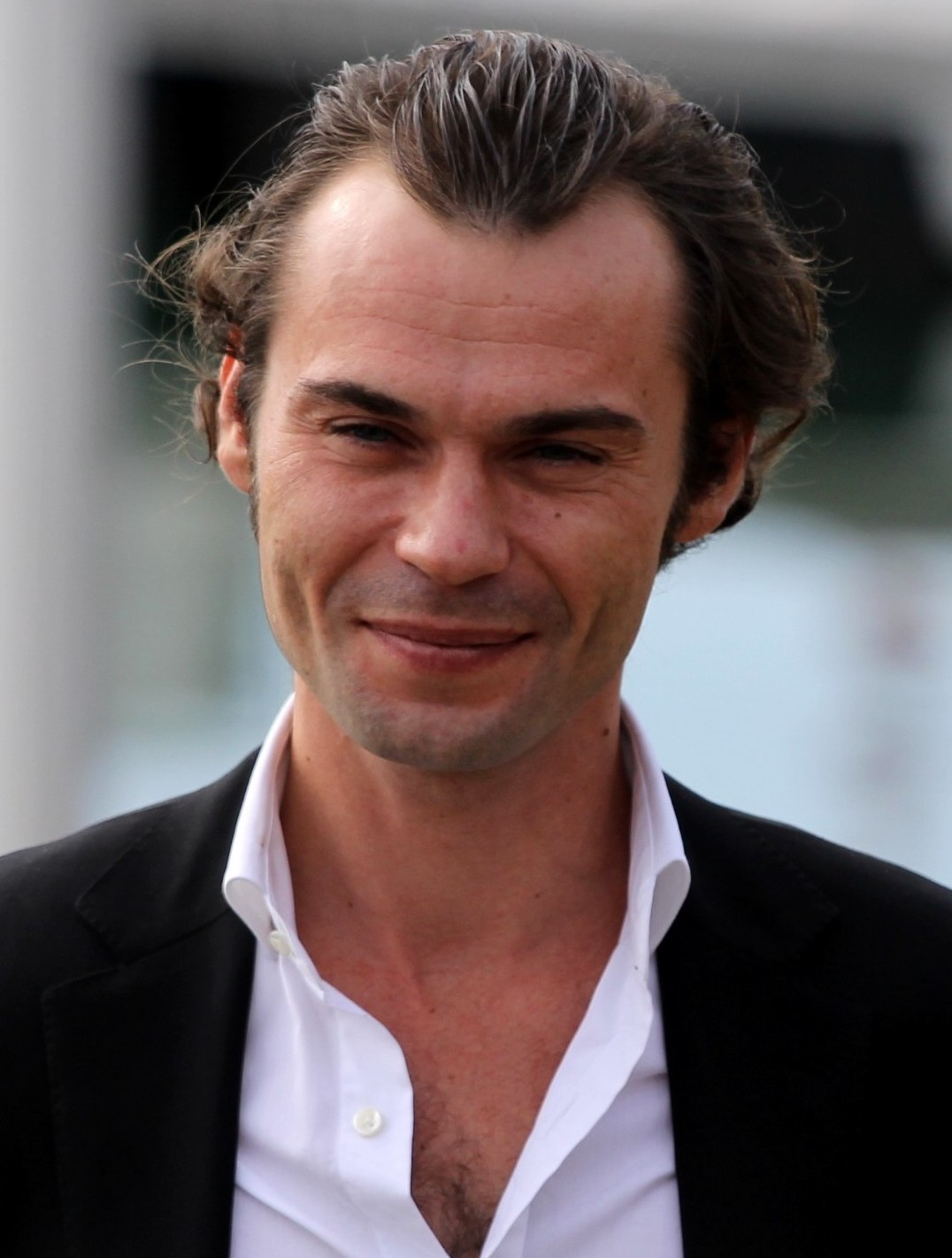
- Born: Louis-Robinson Stévenin; 1 March 1981 (age 44); Lons-le-Saunier, France
- Occupation: Actor
- Years active: 1989–present

Robinson Stévenin (born 1 March 1981) is a French actor.

== Personal life ==
Robinson's father is the actor Jean-François Stévenin. Also in the acting profession are his brother Sagamore Stévenin, Pierre Stévenin and his sister Salomé Stévenin.

== Filmography ==
Year	Title	Role	Director	Notes
1989	L'hydrolution	The boy	Antoine Desrosières	Short
1991	Ils n'avaient pas rendez-vous	Thomas	Maurice Dugowson	TV movie
1992	La Crise	Borin's son	Coline Serreau	
1992	La révolte des enfants	Rase-Motte	Gérard Poitou-Weber	Festival du Film de Paris - Best Actor
1992	Un ballon dans la tête	The little	Michaëla Watteaux	TV movie
1993	Lucas	Lucas	Nadine Trintignant	
1993	L'instit	Guillaume	Jacques Ertaud	TV series (1 episode)
1994	Stop	The teen	Gaël Leforestier	Short
1994	L'amour est un jeu d'enfant	Benjamin Ancelot	Pierre Grimblat	TV movie
1994	Le fils du cordonnier	Pierre	Hervé Baslé	TV mini-series
1996	Le bel été 1914	Gabriel	Christian de Chalonge	
1997	La femme du pêcheur	Vincent	Dominique Cheminal	TV movie
1998	La petite graine		Tessa Racine	Short
1999	Bad Company	Laurent	Jean-Pierre Améris	Nominated - César Award for Most Promising Actor
2001	Mauvais genres (Transfixed in English)	Bo	Francis Girod	César Award for Most Promising Actor
2002	Two	Man on the bike	Werner Schroeter	
2002	Mischka	The handcuffs boy	Jean-François Stévenin	
2003	His Brother	Manuel	Patrice Chéreau	
2003	Little Lili	Julien Marceaux	Claude Miller	
2006	The Colonel	Lieutenant Guy Rossi	Laurent Herbiet	
2006	Transe		Teresa Villaverde	
2006	C'est beau une ville la nuit	Paulo	Richard Bohringer	
2007	Actrices	Julien	Valeria Bruni Tedeschi	
2007	Bluesbreaker	René	Dominique Brenguier	
2008	Sur ta joue ennemie	Julien	Jean-Xavier de Lestrade	
2009	The Army of Crime	Marcel Rayman	Robert Guédiguian	
2009	L'école du pouvoir	Abel Karnonski	Raoul Peck	TV movie
2009	Les Petits Meurtres d'Agatha Christie	Jean	Stéphane Kappes	TV series (1 episode)
2009	Au siècle de Maupassant	Antoine	Olivier Schatzky	TV series (1 episode)
2010	Io sono con te	Sapiente	Guido Chiesa	
2010	Les amants naufragés	Stan Mirkine	Jean-Christophe Delpias	TV movie
2010	Les vivants et les morts	Rudi	Gérard Mordillat	TV series (8 episodes)
2011	The Snows of Kilimanjaro	The commissioner	Robert Guédiguian (2)	
2011	Le secret de l'enfant-fourmi	Didier Germain	Christine François	
2012	Of Snails and Men	Olivier	Tudor Giurgiu	
2012	Hénaut président	Alexandre	Michel Muller	
2012	Les pirogues des hautes terres	Pierre Marie	Olivier Langlois	TV movie
2013	Le renard jaune	Phil	Jean-Pierre Mocky	
2013	Le silence des églises	Gabriel Goffin	Edwin Baily	TV movie
2015	Anton Tchékhov 1890	Kolia Tchekhov	René Féret	
2015	Don't Tell Me the Boy Was Mad	Soghomon Tehlirian	Robert Guédiguian (3)	
2015	Les brigands	Franz	Pol Cruchten & Frank Hoffmann	
2015	Une mère en trop	Lieutenant Ségura	Thierry Petit	TV movie
2015	Neuf jours en hiver	Aurélien	Alain Tasma	TV movie
2016	Fui banquero	Olivier Beauregard	Emilie & Patrick Grandperret	
2016	Des racines	Pierrot	Jeanne Traon-Loiseleux	Short
2016	Glacé : The Frozen Dead	Raphaël Delaunay	Laurent Herbiet (2)	TV series (6 episodes)
2017	La Mante	Alex Crozet	Alexandre Laurent	Netflix Original Series
2018	Krieg der Träume	Marcel Jamet		
