= Yann Trégouët =

French actor

Yann Trégouët (born 25 January 1975, in Paris) is a French actor. He appeared in more than thirty films since 1993.

== Life and career ==
After his baccalaureat, Trégouët studied for three years at the Cours Florent. His began his career with stage appearances and was then seen in ‘Les Six Compagnons’ in 1991, and then as the hitch-hiker in Trois Couleurs : Bleu.

His film career took off with Autrement by Christophe Otzenberger and Marie-Jo et ses deux amours by Robert Guédiguian, and he re-appeared several times in their films. For Otzenberger he starred in Itinéraires in 2005 while he worked with Guédiguian on Lady Jane (2008), L'Armée du crime (2009), Une histoire de fou (2015), La Villa (2016), and Et la fête continue ! (2023).

Trégouët starred alongside Laetitia Casta et Yannick Renier in the 3-hour film Nés en 68 on the events of 1968 in France and consequences for a group of students.

== Selected filmography ==
Film
Year	Title	Role	Notes
2012	Sister	Bruno	
2009	The Army of Crime	Le Commissaire David	
2008	Born in 68	Hervé	
2002	Marie-Jo and Her Two Lovers	Sylvain	
1999	War in the Highlands	David Aviolat	
1997	Artemisia	Fulvio	
1993	Three Colors: Blue	Antoine	
