= Marius and Jeannette =

- Film poster
- Directed by: Robert Guédiguian
- Written by: Jean-Louis Milesi; Robert Guédiguian
- Produced by: Robert Guédiguian; Gilles Sandoz
- Starring: Ariane Ascaride; Gérard Meylan
- Cinematography: Bernard Cavalié
- Edited by: Bernard Sasia
- Distributed by: Diaphana Films
- Release date: 25 August 1997
- Running time: 105 minutes
- Country: France
- Language: French
- Budget: $1.2 million
- Box office: $18.1 million

Marius and Jeannette (French: Marius et Jeannette) is a 1997 French film directed by Robert Guédiguian. It won the Louis Delluc Prize and the César Award for Best Actress, and received César nominations for Best Film, Best Director, Best Supporting Actor, Best Supporting Actress, Most Promising Actress and Best Original Screenplay or Adaptation. It was screened in the Un Certain Regard section at the 1997 Cannes Film Festival.

== Plot ==
Marius and Jeannette live in the same working-class apartment complex in Marseille, in close proximity to their neighbors. The lame Marius is a security guard at an abandoned cement works, and since the company has gone out of business and the plant will soon be demolished, he is squatting in order to save money. Jeannette is a single mother raising her two children on her own on a meagre supermarket checkout operator salary. They meet when Jeannette tries to steal two cans of paint from the cement lot, and Marius catches her and tries to chase her. The following day Marius comes to her door to apologize and brings her the two cans of paint. A relationship soon develops between them, but as both have been wounded by marital difficulties and life in general, they are hesitant to become committed. It does not help that Jeannette's romantic fantasy notions are different from Marius' practical ideas. The two must learn how to love again in order for their relationship to blossom.

== Cast ==
- Ariane Ascaride as Jeannette
- Gérard Meylan as Marius
- Pascale Roberts as Caroline
- Jacques Boudet as Justin
- Frédérique Bonnal as Monique
- Jean-Pierre Darroussin as Dédé
- Laetitia Pesenti as Magali, Jeannette's Daughter
- Miloud Nacer as Malek, Jeannette's son
- Pierre Banderet as Monsieur Ebrard

== Awards and nominations ==
- Butaca Awards (Spain)
  - Nominated: Best Art House Film
- César Awards (France)
  - Won: Best Actress – Leading Role (Ariane Ascaride)
  - Nominated: Best Director (Robert Guédiguian)
  - Nominated: Best Film
  - Nominated: Best Actor – Supporting Role (Jean-Pierre Darroussin)
  - Nominated: Best Actress – Supporting Role (Pascale Roberts)
  - Nominated: Best Original Screenplay or Adaptation (Robert Guédiguian and Jean-Louis Milesi)
  - Nominated: Most Promising Actress (Laetitia Pesenti)
- Goya Awards (Spain)
  - Nominated: Best European Film
- Lumière Awards (France)
  - Won: Best Film
- Sant Jordi Awards (Spain)
  - Won: Best Foreign Actress (Ariane Ascaride)
- Won: Louis Delluc Prize
