= Le cousin =

Le Cousin
- Film poster
- Directed by: Alain Corneau
- Written by: Michel Alexandre; Alain Corneau
- Produced by: Alain Sarde
- Starring: Patrick Timsit; Alain Chabat; Agnès Jaoui; Marie Trintignant; Caroline Proust
- Cinematography: Michel Amathieu
- Edited by: Thierry Derocles
- Music by: Olivier Bloch-Lainé
- Distributed by: BAC Films
- Release date: 10 December 1997 (France)
- Running time: 112 minutes
- Country: France
- Language: French
- Budget: $9.9 million
- Box office: $6.4 million

Le Cousin is a 1997 French film directed by Alain Corneau.

== Plot ==
The film deals with the relationship of the police and an informant in the drug scene.

== Awards and nominations ==
Le Cousin was nominated for 5 César Awards but did not win in any category.
