= Ariane Ascaride =

French actress and screenwriter

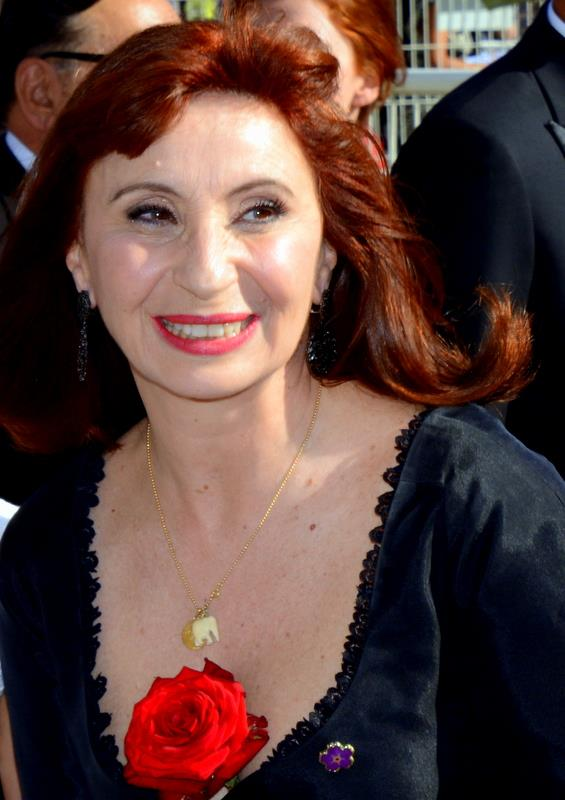
- Ariane Ascaride at the 2015 Cannes Film Festival
- Born: 10 October 1954 (age 71); Marseille, France
- Occupations: Actress, screenwriter
- Years active: 1976–present
- Spouse: Robert Guédiguian (m. 1975)

Ariane Ascaride (born 10 October 1954) is a French actress and screenwriter. She has appeared in films such as Marius et Jeannette (Marius and Jeannette), Ma vraie vie à Rouen (The True Story of My Life in Rouen; USA, My Life on Ice) and À la place du coeur (Where the Heart Is). She also starred in and co-wrote the screenplay for Le Voyage en Arménie (Armenia).

== Personal life ==
Daughter of Henriette, an office worker, and a representative, himself son of Neapolitan immigrant, and sister of the director Pierre Ascaride and the writer Gilles Ascaride, Ariane assists early to the amateur shows in which her father is involved.

Ariane Ascaride is married to the French director Robert Guédiguian.

== Philanthropy ==
The actress is a member of the sponsoring committee of the French Coalition for the Decade for the Culture of Peace and Non-violence.

== Awards ==
Ascaride won the 1998 Best Actress César Award for her role in Marius et Jeannette and was nominated two other times, one for Best Actress for Marie-Jo et ses 2 amours (Marie-Jo and Her 2 Lovers) and for Best Supporting Actress for Brodeuses (A Common Thread; American DVD release, Sequins). She also won the Best Actress award at the Valladolid International Film Festival for The Town Is Quiet.

She won the 2006 Rome Film Festival Best actress award for Le Voyage en Arménie.

== Filmography ==
Year	Title	Role	Director	Notes
1976	Antoine Vitez s'amuse avec Claudel et Brecht		Maria Koleva	
1977	Solemn Communion	Palmyre	René Féret	
1980	À vendre	Gilberte	Christian Drillaud	
1980	Retour à Marseille	Lydie	René Allio	
1981	Dernier été	Josiane	Robert Guédiguian & Frank Le Wita	
1981	L'inspecteur mène l'enquête		Pierre Cavassilas & Marc Pavaux	TV series (1 Episode)
1981	Les amours des années folles	Marie-Louise	Gérard Thomas	TV series (1 Episode)
1982	L'apprentissage de la ville	The Singer	Caroline Huppert	TV movie
1982	Mozart		Marcel Bluwal	TV Mini-Series
1983	Vive la sociale!	Marie-Thé	Gérard Mordillat	
1985	Rouge midi	Maggiorina	Robert Guédiguian	
1985	Ki lo sa ?	Marie	Robert Guédiguian	
1990	Le coupeur d'eau		Philippe Tabarly	Short
1990	Jofroi de la Maussan	Elise	Marcel Bluwal	TV movie
1990	Onorato	Delphine	Marcel Bluwal	TV movie
1991	Dieu vomit les tièdes	Tirelire	Robert Guédiguian	
1993	L'argent fait le bonheur	Simona Viali	Robert Guédiguian	
1993	Grossesse nerveuse	Eliane	Denis Rabaglia	TV movie
1995	À la vie, à la mort!	Marie-Sol	Robert Guédiguian	
1996	Calino Maneige	Calino's Mother	Jean-Patrick Lebel	
1997	L'autre côté de la mer	Lulu	Dominique Cabrera	
1997	Marius et Jeannette	Jeannette	Robert Guédiguian	César Award for Best Actress; Sant Jordi Awards - Best Foreign Actress
1998	Le serpent a mangé la grenouille	Marthe	Alain Guesnier	
1998	À la place du coeur	Marianne Patché	Robert Guédiguian	
1998	Les 3 manteaux		Bénédicte Mellac	Short
1999	Nadia and the Hippos	Nadia	Dominique Cabrera	
1999	Paddy	The Cashier	Gérard Mordillat	
1999	Bad Company	Olivia's Mother	Jean-Pierre Améris	
1999	Nag la bombe	Nag	Jean-Louis Milesi	
1999	Combats de femme	Catherine	Emmanuelle Cuau	TV series (1 Episode)
2000	Drôle de Félix	Isabelle	Olivier Ducastel & Jacques Martineau	
2000	À l'attaque!	Lola	Robert Guédiguian	
2000	The Town Is Quiet	Michèle	Robert Guédiguian	Valladolid International Film Festival - Best Actress; Nominated - European Film Award for Best Actress
2000	Retiens la nuit	Nadia	Dominique Cabrera	TV movie
2002	Marie-Jo and Her Two Lovers	Marie-Jo	Robert Guédiguian	Nominated - César Award for Best Actress; Nominated - European Film Award for Best Actress
2002	Lulu	Jeannette	Jean-Henri Roger	
2002	My Life on Ice	Caroline	Olivier Ducastel & Jacques Martineau	
2003	Le ventre de Juliette	Marie-Brigitte Poradjawski	Martin Provost	
2004	A Common Thread	Madame Mélikian	Éléonore Faucher	Nominated - César Award for Best Supporting Actress
2004	Mon père est ingénieur	Natacha / Marie	Robert Guédiguian	
2004	Le thé d'Ania	Ania	Saïd Ould Khelifa	
2005	Imposture	Brigitte	Patrick Bouchitey	
2005	Miss Montigny	Anna	Miel Van Hoogenbemt	
2005	Code 68	Marianne	Jean-Henri Roger	
2005	Vénus & Apollon	Emmanuelle Le Prieur	Olivier Guignard	TV series (1 Episode)
2006	Changement d'adresse	Julia's Mother	Emmanuel Mouret	
2006	Le voyage en Arménie	Anna	Robert Guédiguian	Rome Film Festival - Best Actress
2006	L'année suivante	Nadine	Isabelle Czajka	
2008	Lady Jane	Muriel	Robert Guédiguian	
2009	The Army of Crime	Madame Elek	Robert Guédiguian	
2009	The Hedgehog	Manuela Lopez	Mona Achache	
2010	Roses à crédit	The Doctor	Amos Gitai	
2010	George et Fanchette	George Sand	Jean-Daniel Verhaeghe	TV movie
2010	La femme qui pleure au chapeau rouge	Dora's Mother	Jean-Daniel Verhaeghe	TV movie
2010	Fracture	Seignol	Alain Tasma	TV movie
2011	The Snows of Kilimanjaro	Marie-Claire	Robert Guédiguian	Nominated - César Award for Best Actress
2011	The Art of Love	Emmanuelle	Emmanuel Mouret	
2011	Delicacy	Nathalie's Mother	David & Stéphane Foenkinos	
2011	Les mauvais jours	Nathalie	Pascale Bailly	TV movie
2012	Divorce et fiançailles	Sido	Olivier Péray	TV movie
2013	Fanny	Claudine	Daniel Auteuil	
2013	Another Life	Claudine	Emmanuel Mouret	
2013	C'est pas de l'amour	Bénévole	Jérôme Cornuau	TV movie
2014	Ariane's Thread	Ariane	Robert Guédiguian	
2014	Once in a Lifetime	Anne Gueguen	Marie-Castille Mention-Schaar	
2015	L'amour ne pardonne pas	Adrienne	Stefano Consiglio	
2015	Don't Tell Me the Boy Was Mad	Anouch	Robert Guédiguian	
2016	Heaven Will Wait		Marie-Castille Mention-Schaar	
2017	The House by the Sea	Angèle Barberini	Robert Guédiguian	
2019	Gloria Mundi	Sylvie	Robert Guédiguian	Volpi Cup for Best Actress
2020	Possessions	Louisa		TV series
2021	L’ami qui n’existe pas	The psychologist		
2022	No Dogs or Italians Allowed (Interdit aux chiens et aux italiens)	Cesira	Alain Ughetto	Voice role
2025	How Are You? (Comment ça va?)	Voice role (Elephant)	Caroline Poggi and Jonathan Vinel	Short animated film screened in Berlinale 2025 on 15 February.
2026	A Woman Today	Cathy	Robert Guédiguian	

== Decorations ==
- Commander of the Order of Arts and Letters (2015)
