= Robert Guédiguian =

French film director and actor

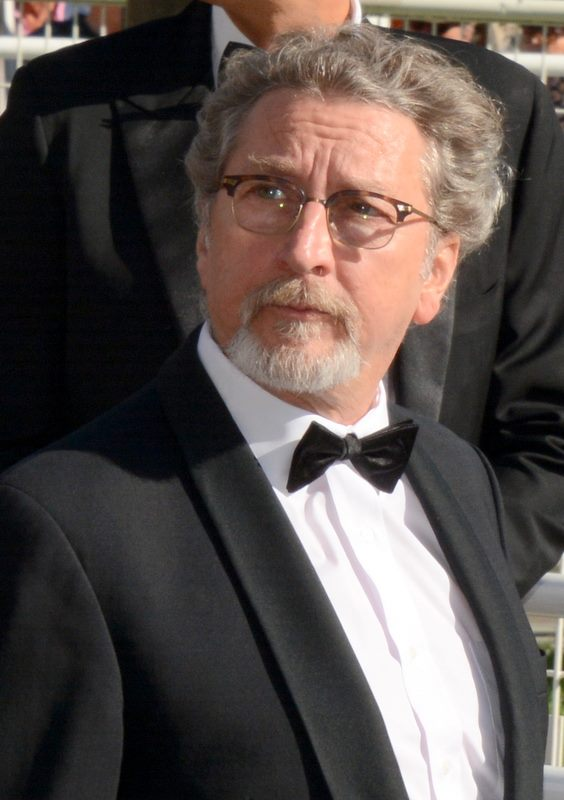
- Guédiguian at the 2015 Cannes Film Festival
- Born: Robert Jules Guédiguian; 3 December 1953 (age 72); Marseille, France
- Occupations: Film director, producer, screenwriter, actor
- Years active: 1980–present
- Spouse: Ariane Ascaride (m. 1975)

Robert Jules Guédiguian (French: [ʁɔbɛʁ ɡediɡjɑ̃]; born 3 December 1953) is a French filmmaker, producer and actor. Most known for Marius and Jeannette (1997) and Gloria Mundi (2019), his films usually star his wife Ariane Ascaride or Jean-Pierre Darroussin.

== Life ==
Guédiguian is the son of a German mother and an Armenian father, whose family immigrated to France in the early 20th century after the Armenian genocide. He evokes his paternal roots in his 2006 film Le Voyage en Armenie. He has a working-class background, as his father is a worker on the Marseille docks. Guédiguian became concerned with political questions and for a while was involved with the French Communist Party. In 2008 he joined the Left Party in France.

He has been married to actress Ariane Ascaride since 1975 and they have two daughters, Valentine and Madeleine.

== Career ==
Like Marcel Pagnol and René Allio before him, he anchors his films in social reality. His films are strongly marked by the local and regional environment of the city of Marseille, and in particular L'Estaque (north-west Marseille), for example in Marius et Jeannette. His 2011 film The Snows of Kilimanjaro premiered in the Un Certain Regard section at the 2011 Cannes Film Festival.

In December 2023, alongside 50 other filmmakers, Guédiguian signed an open letter published in Libération demanding a ceasefire and an end to the killing of civilians amid the 2023 Israeli invasion of the Gaza Strip, and for a humanitarian corridor into Gaza to be established for humanitarian aid, and the release of hostages.

== Filmography ==
=== As filmmaker ===
Year	English title	Original title	Notes
1981	Last Summer		
1985	Rouge midi		
1985	Ki lo sa?		
1991	Dieu vomit les tièdes		Also associate producer
1993	L'Argent fait le bonheur		
1995	Til Death Do Us Part	À la vie, à la mort!	Also producer Bayard d'Or for Best Film
1997	Marius and Jeannette	Marius et Jeannette	Louis Delluc Prize for Best Film; Lumière Award for Best Film; Nominated—César Award for Best Film; Nominated—César Award for Best Director; Nominated—Best Original Screenplay or Adaptation; Nominated—Goya Award for Best European Film
1998	Where the Heart Is	À la place du coeur	San Sebastián International Film Festival - Special Jury Prize; San Sebastián International Film Festival - Alma Award for Best Screenplay (Honorable Mention)
2000	Charge!	À l'Attaque!	
2000	The Town Is Quiet	La ville est tranquille	Also producer European Film Awards - FIPRESCI Prize; Valladolid International Film Festival - Golden Spike; Nominated—European Film Award for Best Screenwriter
2002	Marie-Jo and Her Two Lovers	Marie-Jo et ses deux amours	Also producer Nominated—2002 Cannes Film Festival - Palme d'Or
2004	My Father Is an Engineer	Mon père est ingénieur	Also producer 2nd Yerevan Golden Apricot International Film Festival - Prize of the Armenian Association of Film Critics and Cinema Journalists for Best Feature Film
2005	The Last Mitterrand	Le Promeneur du Champ de Mars	Also producer Nominated—55th Berlin International Film Festival - Golden Bear
2006	Armenia	Le voyage en Arménie	Also producer 3rd Yerevan Golden Apricot International Film Festival - Silver Apricot Special Prize for Feature Film
2008	Lady Jane		Also producer Nominated—58th Berlin International Film Festival - Golden Bear
2009	The Army of Crime	L'Armée du crime	
2011	The Snows of Kilimanjaro	Les Neiges du Kilimandjaro	European Parliament LUX Prize; Lumière Award for Best Screenplay; Swann d'Or for Best Director; Valladolid International Film Festival - Silver Spike; Valladolid International Film Festival - Audience Award; Nominated—2011 Cannes Film Festival - Prix Un certain regard
2014	Ariane's Thread	Au fil d'Ariane	Also producer
2015	Don't Tell Me the Boy Was Mad	Une histoire de fou	Also producer
2017	The House by the Sea	La villa	
2019	Gloria Mundi		Nominated— 76th Venice International Film Festival - Golden Lion
2021	Dancing the Twist in Bamako	Twist à Bamako	
2023	And the Party Goes On	Et la fête continue!	
2024	La Pie voleuse		
2026	A Woman Today	Une femme aujourd'hui	

=== Other credits ===
Year	Title	Credited as		Notes
Year	Title	Screenwriter	Producer	Notes
1980	Fernand	Yes		
1985	Le Souffleur	Yes	Yes	
1989	Roundabout		Yes	
1989	Montalvo and the Child		Yes	
1990	Le Coupeur d'eau		Yes	Short film
1991	Le Cri du cochon		Yes	
1992	C'est trop con!		Yes	Short film
2002	Romances de terre et d'eau		Yes	Documentary film
2004	Bad Spelling		Yes	
2005	Crustacés et Coquillages		Yes	As associate producer
2005	Free Zone		Yes	Co-producer
2006	Le Dernier des fous		Yes	
2007	Beneath the Rooftops of Paris		Yes	
2009	Sisters		Yes	
2010	Les Amants naufragés		Yes	Telefilm
2011	La Vie en miettes		Yes	Telefilm
2013	Notre monde		Yes	Documentary film
2013	My Sweet Pepper Land		Yes	
2013	Les Déferlantes		Yes	Telefilm
2017	The Young Karl Marx		Yes	

=== As actor ===
- 1990: L'Ami Giono: Jofroi de la Maussan (Telefilm)
- 2002: Lulu as Marius
- 2012: Rendezvous in Kiruna
- 2021: Twist à Bamako
