= List of French films of 2010 =

A list of French-produced or co-produced films released in France in 2010. 263 French films were released in 2010.

Title	Director	Cast	Genre	Notes
L'Amour fou	Pierre Thoretton	Yves Saint-Laurent, Pierre Bergé	Documentary	
The Assault	Julien Leclercq	Vincent Elbaz, Grégori Derangère	Action thriller	
Bacon on the Side (Il reste du jambon?)	Anne Depétrini	Ramzy Bedia, Anne Marivin	Romantic comedy	
Beautiful Lies (De vrais mensonges)	Pierre Salvadori	Audrey Tautou, Nathalie Baye, Sami Bouajila	Romantic comedy	
Black Venus	Abdellatif Kechiche	Yahima Tores, Olivier Gourmet	Drama	Entered into the 67th Venice International Film Festival.
Caged (Captifs)	Yann Gozlan	Zoé Félix	Horror film	
Copacabana	Marc Fitoussi	Isabelle Huppert, Lolita Chammah	Comedy	
Domain (Domaine)	Patric Chiha	Béatrice Dalle, Isaïe Sultan, Alain Libolt	Comedy, Drama	14 April 2010
Ensemble c'est trop	Léa Fazer	Nathalie Baye, Pierre Arditi, Aïssa Maïga	Comedy	
The Extraordinary Adventures of Adèle Blanc-Sec (Les Aventures extraordinaires d'Adèle Blanc-Sec)	Luc Besson	Louise Bourgoin, Matthew Amalric, Gilles Lellouche, Jean-Paul Rouve	Fantasy film, Adventure film, Film adaptation	Based on the Franco-Belgian comics series of the same name, written and illustrated by Jacques Tardi.
From Paris with Love	Pierre Morel	John Travolta, Jonathan Rhys Meyers, Melissa Mars	Action	
Gainsbourg (Vie héroïque)	Joann Sfar	Eric Elmosino, Lucy Gordon	Drama	
The Ghost Writer	Roman Polanski	Ewan McGregor, Pierce Brosnan, Kim Cattrall	Thriller	
Happy Few	Antony Cordier	Marina Foïs, Élodie Bouchez	Romance	Entered into the 67th Venice International Film Festival.
The Hedgehog (Le hérisson)	Mona Achache	Josiane Balasko; Garance Le Guillermic		Based on the novel The Elegance of the Hedgehog by Muriel Barbery
Little White Lies	Guillaume Canet	François Cluzet, Marion Cotillard	Comedy, drama	
Love Like Poison (Un Poison Violent)	Katell Quillévéré	Clara Augarde, Lio, Michel Galabru	Drama	Premiered at the 2010 Cannes Film Festival
The Names of Love (Le Nom des gens)	Michel Leclerc	Sara Forestier, Jacques Gamblin, Zinedine Soualem		The film was awarded two César Awards in 2011, including Best Actress for Sara Forestier and Best Original Screenplay. The former French Prime Minister Lionel Jospin makes a cameo appearance.
Nanny McPhee and the Big Bang	Susanna White	Emma Thompson, Maggie Gyllenhaal, Asa Butterfield, Rhys Ifans, Ralph Fiennes, Ewan McGregor, Maggie Smith	Period fantasy comedy	British-French-American co-production
Of Gods and Men (Des hommes et des dieux)	Xavier Beauvois	Lambert Wilson, Michael Lonsdale	Drama	
On Tour (Tournée)	Mathieu Amalric	Mathieu Amalric	Comedy	
Rubber	Quentin Dupieux	Stephen Spinella, Roxane Mesquida, Jack Plotnick	Horror comedy film	
Sarah's Key (Elle s'appelait Sarah)	Gilles Paquet-Brenner	Kristin Scott Thomas	Drama	
Simon Werner a Disparu	Fabrice Gobert	Jules Pelissier, Ana Girardot, Serge Riaboukine	Thriller	
The Tree	Julie Bertuccelli	Charlotte Gainsbourg	Drama	This is a Christmas film, in a French/Australian co-production and the film premiered in 2010 Cannes Film Festival.
22 Bullets	Richard Berry	Jean Reno, Gabriella Wright, Kad Merad	Action	
The Woman That Dreamed About a Man	Per Fly	Sonja Richter, Marcin Dorociński, Mikael Nyqvist	Drama	
The Abandoned	Adis Bakrač	Mira Furlan, Tony Grga	Drama	Entered into the Cannes Film Festival, Karlovy Vary International Film Festival, Santa Barbara International Film Festival, Hollywood Film Festival; Golden Arena for Best Actor in a Leading Role (Tony Grga) at the 2010 Pula Film Festival.
Une petite zone de turbulences	Alfred Lot	Michel Blanc, Miou-Miou, Mélanie Doutey, Gilles Lellouche, Cyril Descours	Comedy	English title: A Spot of Bother
