= Un soir au club =

Un soir au club may refer to:

- Un soir au club (novel), a 2001 novel by Christian Gailly
- Un soir au club (film), a 2009 film directed by Jean Achache, adapted from the novel
