= The Snows of Kilimanjaro =

The Snows of Kilimanjaro may refer to:

- "The Snows of Kilimanjaro" (short story), a short story by Ernest Hemingway first published in Esquire in 1936
- The Snows of Kilimanjaro (short story collection), also known as The Snows of Kilimanjaro and Other Stories, a collection of short stories by Hemingway, published in 1961
- Kilimandjaro (song), a French-language song by Pascal Danel known in that language as "Les Neiges du Kilimandjaro" (which translates to "The Snows of Kilimanjaro")
- The Snows of Kilimanjaro (1952 film), a 1952 American film
- The Snows of Kilimanjaro (2011 film), a 2011 French film
