= Kilimanjaro (disambiguation) =

Mount Kilimanjaro is a volcano in Tanzania and the highest mountain in Africa.

Kilimanjaro may also refer to:

== Tanzania ==
- Kilimanjaro National Park comprises the whole of Mount Kilimanjaro above the tree line and six forest corridors stretching down
- Kilimanjaro Region, a region in Tanzania
- Kilimanjaro (ward), a ward in the Moshi Urban district of Kilimanjaro Region, Tanzania
- Kilimanjaro International Airport in Tanzania
- a Tanzanian beer, see Beer in Africa#Eastern Africa
- a Tanzanite jewellery brand owned by F. Hinds

== Music ==
- Killamanjaro, a Jamaican reggae sound system

=== Albums ===
- Kilimanjaro, an album by German artist Superpitcher
- Kilimanjaro (The Rippingtons album), a 1988 album by The Rippingtons
- Kilimanjaro (The Teardrop Explodes album), an album by The Teardrop Explodes

=== Songs ===
- "Kilimanjaro", song by The Del Vikings 1962
- "Kilimanjaro", song by Manhattan Brothers 1955
- "Kilimanjaro", song by The Teardrop Explodes 1980
- "Kilimanjaro", song by Juluka 1984
- "Kilimandjaro" (song), a 1966 French-language song by French singer Pascal Danel
- "Kilimanjaro" (song), a 2010 song by A.R. Rahman from the film Enthiran
- "Kilimanjaro", a song by KSI from the 2016 extended play Keep Up
- “Killamonjaro”, a 2017 song by Canadian rapper Killy (rapper)

== Film ==
- Kilimanjaro (film), a 2013 American film

== Nigeria ==
- Kilimanjaro (restaurant), a fast-food chain in Nigeria

== See also ==
- The Snows of Kilimanjaro (disambiguation)
