= Fathers and Sons (short story) =

1933 short story by Ernest Hemingway

"Fathers and Sons" is a short story by Ernest Hemingway published 1933, in the collection Winner Take Nothing. It later appeared in The Fifth Column and the First Forty-Nine Stories and The Snows of Kilimanjaro and Other Stories.

The story is a personal narrative that follows the path of Nick Adams as he drives through his hometown with his son. Most of the story is told through memories of Nick's childhood and Father. The story chronicles the relationships between three generations of men.

Important themes in "Fathers and Sons" include father–son relationships, Nick's homecoming, growing up, and role models.

== Plot ==
"Fathers and Sons" is a story about Nicholas Adams driving home with his son after a hunting trip in his hometown. Hunting imagery and small-town agriculture make Nick think about his father, who taught him how to hunt. Nick's father had a fantastic vision, but Nick says this skill made him nervous. Nick's father was a sentimental man, and Nick says that most sentimental people are both cruel and abused. Nick loved his father, but hated the way he smelled. Nick lost his sense of smell when he started smoking, which he reflects is a good thing because a good sense of smell is not necessary to man. Nick never shared anything with his father past the age of fifteen. Nick's father taught him how to hunt by giving him only three bullets a day. Nick learned much from his father about hunting.

Nick is interrupted from his memories by his son, who asks what it's like to live with Indians and if he can have a gun. Nick tells him that it's his son's decision if he wants to live with Indians, and that he can have a gun at age twelve. Nick thinks about, but does not tell his son, how Trudy "did first what no one has ever done better." He also thinks to himself that shooting one flying bird is like shooting all flying birds—the experience is always just as good. Nick's son does not believe that his grandfather could have been a better hunter than Nick, but Nick says that the man was always disappointed in the way Nick shot. Nick's son expresses regret that they have never yet prayed at his grandfather's grave and concern that he will not be able to pray at his father's grave, and Nick says that he can see that they will need to do that soon.

== Style ==
"Fathers and Sons" is another example of the classic "Hemingway Style." Characterized by economy and iceberg theory, the "Hemingway Style" is the product of obsessive revision. Hemingway himself, when asked about his style, said "I must say that what amateurs call a style is usually only the unavoidable awkwardness in first trying to make something that has not heretofore been made."
