= The Snows of Kilimanjaro (short story collection) =

Short story collection by Ernest Hemingway

- First Edition
- Author: Ernest Hemingway
- Language: English
- Genre: Short stories
- Publisher: Charles Scribner's Sons
- Publication date: 1961
- Publication place: United States
- Media type: Print (hardback & paperback)
- ISBN: 9781476770208
- OCLC: 31044981

The Snows of Kilimanjaro and Other Stories is a collection of short stories by Ernest Hemingway, published in 1961. All the stories were earlier published in The Fifth Column and the First Forty-Nine Stories in 1938.

The collection includes the following stories:

- "The Snows of Kilimanjaro"
- "A Clean, Well-Lighted Place"
- "A Day's Wait"
- "The Gambler, the Nun, and the Radio"
- "Fathers and Sons"
- "In Another Country"
- "The Killers"
- "A Way You'll Never Be"
- "Fifty Grand"
- "The Short Happy Life of Francis Macomber"

== Film adaptations ==
- The Snows of Kilimanjaro (1952 film), a 1952 American film
- The Snows of Kilimanjaro (2011 film), a 2011 French film
- The Killers (1946 film), a 1946 American film
- The Killers (1956 film), a 1956 Russian film
- The Killers (1964 film), a 1964 American film
- The Macomber Affair, a 1947 American film

== See also ==
Snows of Kilimanjaro and Other Stories at Google Books
