= The Gambler, the Nun, and the Radio =

Short story by Ernest Hemingway

"The Gambler, the Nun, and the Radio" is a short story by Ernest Hemingway published in his 1933 collection of short stories Winner Take Nothing. The original title of the story was "Give Us a Prescription, Doctor". "The Gambler, the Nun, and the Radio" later appeared in Hemingway's 1961 short story collection The Snows of Kilimanjaro.

The story takes place in a hospital run by a convent. The story focuses around a Mexican gambler named Cayetano, who was shot in a small town in Montana, a nun who aspires to be a saint and prays for everything or anything, and a writer named Mr. Frazer, who is ill, and constantly listens to the radio. To ease Cayetano's perceived loneliness, the nun asks the police "to send some Mexicans up to see poor Cayentano." The police send three Mexican musicians who are friends of the person who shot Cayetano. One of the three musicians tells Frazer: "Religion is the opium of the poor." The musician then says that he has never tried opium because "It seems it is very bad. One commences and cannot stop. It is a vice." Frazer then asks if all people need an opium to keep them from suffering too much. The nun had prayer, the doctors had humor, Cayetano had gambling and now the music of the three, and Frazer had his radio.

The story was dramatized for television in a one-hour adaptation shown in 1960. The television version starred Eleanor Parker, Richard Conte, and Charles Bickford. It was co-directed by Albert Marre, who directed the original stage production of Man of La Mancha.
