= Little Girl Blue (2023 film) =

Biographical docudrama film by Mona Achache

- Theatrical release poster
- Directed by: Mona Achache
- Written by: Mona Achache
- Produced by: Laetitia Gonzalez; Yaël Fogiel
- Starring: Marion Cotillard; Mona Achache
- Cinematography: Noé Bach
- Edited by: Valerie Loiseleux
- Music by: Valentin Couineau
- Production companies: Les Films du Poisson; Wrong Men; France 2 Cinéma; RTBF
- Distributed by: Tandem (France); Galeries Distribution (Belgium)
- Release dates: 21 May 2023 (Cannes); 15 November 2023 (France); 3 April 2024 (Belgium)
- Running time: 95 minutes
- Countries: France; Belgium
- Language: French
- Budget: €910.043
- Box office: $443,485

Little Girl Blue is a 2023 biographical docudrama film written and directed by Mona Achache based on the life of her mother, the writer and photographer Carole Achache, starring Marion Cotillard as Carole Achache and Mona Achache as herself. The film is a co-production between France and Belgium and had its world premiere at the 2023 Cannes Film Festival in the Special Screenings section on 21 May 2023, where it competed for the Golden Eye and was well received by critics. The title comes from the song of the same name written by Richard Rodgers and Lorenz Hart. The film was released theatrically in France by Tandem on 15 November 2023 and in Belgium by Galeries Distribution on 3 April 2024.

Little Girl Blue received three nominations at the 2024 César Awards: Best Documentary Film, Best Editing, and Best Actress for Cotillard, becoming the first actress to be nominated for a documentary film. It won the French Society of Cinematographers Award for Best Cinematography for a Documentary.

== Plot ==
After the 2016 suicide of writer and photographer Carole Achache, her daughter Mona Achache, a film director, found thousands of photos, letters, and audio recordings that her mother left behind. To better understand her mother's death and who she was, Mona Achache asked actress Marion Cotillard to portray her mother in a docudrama investigating Carole's childhood, her relationship with her mother, the writer Monique Lange, and the abuses that Carole suffered at the hands of men such as writer Jean Genet.

== Cast ==
- Marion Cotillard as Carole Achache
- Mona Achache as herself
- Marie Bunel as Kathleen Evin
- Marie-Christine Adam as Florence Malraux
- Pierre Aussedat as Nikos Papatakis
- Jacques Boudet as Daniel Cordier
- Didier Flamand as Jorge Semprún
- Brigitte Sy as Monique Lange (voice)
- Àlex Brendemühl as Juan Goytisolo (voice)
- Jeremy Lewin as Jean-Jacques Salomon (voice)
- Jean Achache
- Tella Kpomahou
- Guy Donald Koukissa

== Production ==
=== Development ===
On 7 January 2020, it was announced that France's CNC had granted an advance on earnings to Mona Achache's documentary project Little Girl Blue, whose production details were yet to be formalized.

On 10 December 2022, it was announced that Achache had recently filmed a docudrama about her mother's life starring Marion Cotillard as the director's mother, and that Achache would also star in the film. Achache also wrote the screenplay. The editing process started on 2 January 2023.

The title Little Girl Blue comes from the song of the same name by Richard Rodgers and Lorenz Hart, whose version sung by Janis Joplin is featured in the film. It was also the song that Mona Achache and her brother chose for their mother's funeral.

The film is a co-production between France's Les Films du Poisson with France 2 and Belgium's Wrong Men and RTBF. The total budget for the film was €910.043, with €32.000 from Belgium's Tax Shelter. The film also received investment from Chanel, of which Cotillard is a brand ambassador.

Achache said of the film:

All my life, I have looked for my mother, in female figures around me. Mine was very flawed. And then she hung herself. I packed her belongings. I came across pictures of her. I see a sublime woman there that I don't recognize. So, for the first time in my life, I go in search of my own mother. Through it, I will also explore an era, an environment, a movement: the literary Paris of the 60s and 70s. The sexual, homosexual revolution. The liberation of women. The return of morality and conformism in the 80s. The lost illusions of the post-sixty-eighters. (Note: A "sixty-eighter" ("soixante-huitard" in French) is a person who participated in the May 1968 protests in France.)

Achache said she cast Cotillard to play her mother due to the resemblance between Cotillard and her mother when she was young, and also because she wanted an iconic actress for the role, as a counterbalance to her mother's death and all the darkness she had inside her. "There is a kind of incredible resemblance to my young mother, this kind of insolent beauty, freedom, charisma. And then the story is so dark that I wanted to bring her a woman who would come to completely contradict her with her light," Achache said. Achache had met Cotillard through mutual friends, and although they did not know each other well, Achache felt that they shared "a similar sensibility and, perhaps, similar experiences", and she also felt that Cotillard had the capacity to embody her mother. Cotillard said the story portrayed in the film felt close to her, as her mother and her grandmother have also suffered abuse in their relationships with men.

Director of photography Noé Bach said that Mathieu Amalric's Barbara (2017) and Marco Bellocchio's Vincere (2009), were some of the reference films for Little Girl Blue that he and set designer Héléna Cisterne watched together with director Mona Achache.

=== Filming ===
The film was shot in 15 days. Filming took place in Mulhouse in the Grand Est region of France between 20 November and 10 December 2022.

The film was shot in chronological order. Marion Cotillard filmed all of her scenes in only eight days. She had only two months to prepare for the film.

As Carole Achache's apartment no longer exists, both the scenes set in her apartment and all the sets in the film were shot in the offices of an abandoned factory in Mulhouse.

Due to several issues such as blockage, cars, passers-by, and Cotillard's availability, it was complicated to organize a day of filming in Paris for Cotillard's wanderings, so Mona Achache suggested using a rear projection process to give the illusion of this exterior. Achache and director of photography Noé Bach shot with a Steadicam in the empty streets of Paris during the early morning, at dawn and at night. These shots were then projected onto a wall on the set where Cotillard walked facing the camera on a treadmill with the projection behind her.

Cotillard wore a curly brown wig, brown contact lenses to cover her natural blue eyes, and prosthetic makeup to achieve a resemblance to Carole Achache and also for her progressive aging. The makeup was done by Daniel Weimer and Accurate Dreams studio along with makeup artist Pamela Goldammer. The team spent between two and four hours each morning applying the makeup on Cotillard's face.

== Release ==
The first poster for the film was unveiled on 24 April 2023. The first stills from the film were unveiled in early May on the website of the Cannes Film Festival. On 26 May 2023, Deadline unveiled the first clip from the film during their interview with Mona Achache and Marion Cotillard that was conducted by Pete Hammond.

The film had its world premiere at the 2023 Cannes Film Festival in the Special Screenings section on 21 May 2023, where it competed for the Golden Eye and earned a standing ovation at the end of its screening.

The film made its North American premiere at the 50th Telluride Film Festival on 1 September 2023. It was screened at the 2023 BFI London Film Festival in the section Dare on 12 October 2023, and was screened at the 2023 AFI Fest in the Discovery section on 29 October 2023.

The film was originally set to be released theatrically in France by Tandem on 1 November 2023, but the release was pushed back to 15 November 2023. International sales are handled by the Paris-based company Charades. The film was released theatrically in Belgium by Galeries Distribution on 3 April 2024.

=== Home video ===
The film was made available for streaming in France on 14 March 2024. It was released on DVD in France on 4 June 2024. The extras include a 45-minute interview between Mona Achache and Marion Cotillard.

== Soundtrack ==
The album with the soundtrack composed by Valentin Couineau was released by Les Films du Poisson on 15 November 2023.

Little Girl Blue (Bande originale du film)

Soundtrack album by Valentin Couineau
- Released: 15 November 2023
- Genre: Film soundtrack
- Length: 24:19
- Label: Les Films du Poisson

All tracks are written by Valentin Couineau.

Little Girl Blue (Bande originale du film) track listing
No.	Title	Length
1.	"En avoir marre"	1:31
2.	"Carole"	0:59
3.	"La baleine"	2:35
4.	"La métamorphose"	3:14
5.	"La petite sirène"	1:16
6.	"New York 68"	1:23
7.	"En descente"	2:30
8.	"Blue blue cafard"	1:33
9.	"L'escalier"	1:31
10.	"La marche"	1:30
11.	"La nuit"	0:59
12.	"Pampelune"	2:54
13.	"Les madones"	1:50
14.	"Le funambule"	3:54
Total length:		24:19

== Reception ==
=== Critical response ===
The film received generally positive reviews from critics. AlloCiné, a French cinema site, gave the film an average rating of 4.0/5, based on a survey of 26 French reviews, making it the highest-rated French film released on the week of 15 November 2023. Rotten Tomatoes gives the film a score of 83% based on 6 reviews, with a weighted average of 8.80/10.

Allan Hunter of Screen Daily said in his review: "Achache's voyage around her mother ultimately blossoms into a shocking tale of abuse, shame, self-loathing and the quest for redemption. It offers a brave, cathartic reckoning with the past and the people in your life that you can love and hate, often at the same time." About Cotillard's performance, Hunter said: "Cotillard dresses herself in the clothes that Achache presents – her late mother’s jeans, t-shirt, scarf and glasses. She dons a wig, accepts Carole’s handbag and its contents and a skoosh of her preferred perfume. Suitably transformed, Cotillard plays Carole in reconstructions of key events and interviews. It is an approach echoing the lip-synching triumph of Alan Cumming in My Old School (2022). Achache goes even further by making the viewer aware of the process. We witness Cotillard running her lines, fluffing her dialogue, trying to match Carole's words with her lips and receiving specific instruction from the director. It can break the spell of the performance but Cotillard does deliver, especially in the soul-searching, confessional scenes from Carole's later years."

Dave Calhoun of Time Out gave the film 4 out of 5 stars and wrote: "Little Girl Blue works as a tribute, a post-mortem and an act of attempted closure. It bravely deals with inherited trauma and repeated patterns of abuse, giving us a family story dominated by women ('men were secondary,' says Carole) but darkened by men. Cotillard's role is illuminating, giving voice and life to this complicated character who ages and sours before our eyes. It's honest, revealing and inventive."

Jan Lumholdt of Cineuropa called the film "an unorthodox yet proper piece of the grief process, deeply personal on Achache's side and compelling for the viewer, who is allowed into these private rooms." Lumholdt called the scene where Cotillard wears Carole Achache's clothes, accessories and perfurme, "a scene that will surely make its way into the best-of-the-year summaries of French cinema of 2023".

Xan Brooks of The Guardian called the film "a mesmerising docudrama inquiry" and named it as the best documentary of the 2023 Cannes Film Festival.

Álex Vicente of El País said that Little Girl Blue "also works as a kind of documentary about an obsessive and insecure actress — as all perfectionists are — who we watch as she tries to caress a little bit of truth, falling down but getting up again. Failing again, failing better."

Valentine Servant-Ulgu of Vanity Fair France wrote that Achache "signs a singular object of cinema, of a raw and striking truth, supported by cultural and popular references", and that Cotillard "is at the top of her art. The actress signs here an interpretative performance of a rare and refined emotion."

Sandra Onana of Libération wrote that "Mona Achache recruits an impeccable Marion Cotillard to bring her mother back to life for a beautiful and tortuous docu-fiction experience."

Leslie Felperin of The Hollywood Reporter wrote that the film is "a fascinating psychodrama — with extra scoops of meta on top — that showcases the talents of all the story's women, especially Cotillard and Achache," and praised Cotillard's performance by calling it "a full-on Method immersion that climaxes with a wrenching breakdown scene that seems to close some kind of gap between the two women."

Screen Daily's critic Jonathan Romney named Little Girl Blue as one of the top documentaries of 2023.

French magazine L'Obs included the film in its list of "the 23 films that made us happy in 2023".

In January 2024, The Hollywood Reporter included the film in its "top 10 list of still-unsold international features from 2023 that U.S. audiences deserve to see".

=== Box office ===
The film was released to 101 theaters in France, where it debuted at number nine at the box office in its first day of release, and number four in Paris among the new releases on 15 November 2023, selling 361 admissions from 8 sessions. In its first weekend of release in France, the film sold 20.092 admissions from 101 theaters, ranking at number eight among the new releases.

== Accolades ==
For her performance in Little Girl Blue, Marion Cotillard became the first actress to be nominated for a César Award for Best Actress for a documentary film.

Award / Film Festival	Date of ceremony	Category	Recipient(s)	Result	Ref(s)
Cannes Film Festival	27 May 2023	Golden Eye	Mona Achache	Nominated	
CineLibri	20 October 2023	Best Documentary	Mona Achache	Nominated	
Rencontres du cinéma francophone en Beaujolais	12 November 2023	Jury Award	Mona Achache	Nominated	
Festival international du cinéma francophone en Acadie	24 November 2023	Best Medium or Feature-Length Documentary	Mona Achache	Nominated	
Prix Louis-Delluc	6 December 2023	Best Film	Mona Achache	Nominated	
Lumière Awards	22 January 2024	Best Documentary	Mona Achache	Nominated	
Paris Film Critics Awards	4 February 2024	Best Documentary	Mona Achache	Nominated	
Paris Film Critics Awards	4 February 2024	Best Actress	Marion Cotillard	Nominated	
Trophées du Film français	6 February 2024	Scam Award for Best Documentary	Mona Achache	Nominated	
César Awards	23 February 2024	Best Actress	Marion Cotillard	Nominated	
César Awards	23 February 2024	Best Editing	Valérie Loiseleux	Nominated	
César Awards	23 February 2024	Best Documentary Film	Mona Achache, Laetitia Gonzalez and Yaël Fogiel	Nominated	
Brussels Art Film Festival	17 November 2024	Best Film - National Competition	Little Girl Blue	Nominated	
French Society of Cinematographers Awards	4 February 2025	Best Cinematography for a Documentary	Noé Bach	Won	
