= Carole Achache =

French writer, photographer and actress

- Born: Carole Hélène Marthe Andrée Salomon-Lange; 31 May 1952; Paris, France
- Died: 1 March 2016 (aged 63); Paris, France
- Occupations: Writer; photographer; actress
- Spouse: Jean Achache (m. 2016, died)
- Children: Two, including Mona Achache
- Writing career
- Genres: Novel; photography

Carole Hélène Marthe Andrée Achache (née Salomon-Lange; 31 May 1952 – 1 March 2016) was a French writer, photographer and actress. She was the daughter of French writer Monique Lange and the mother of French-Moroccan film director Mona Achache. She appeared in films such as The Gypsy (1975), Special Section (1975), Lumière (1976), Mr. Klein (1976), Le Juge Fayard dit Le Shériff (1977), and Death of a Corrupt Man (1977) under the name Carole Lange. She later worked as a still photographer in the films Other People's Money (1978), A Week's Vacation (1980), The Trout (1982), and Un soir au club (2009). As an author, Achache published five books.

Achache died in Paris on 1 March 2016 at the age of 63. Her death was ruled as suicide by hanging.

== Early life ==
Achache was born in Paris, France on 31 May 1952. She was the daughter of French writer Monique Lange and of French science historian Jean-Jacques Salomon, who left her mother when Achache was a child. Her mother was born Jewish and later converted to Catholicism. Her maternal grandfather, Robert Lange, was a French journalist and politician. American writer William Faulkner was her godfather. Spanish writer Juan Goytisolo was her step-father.

When Achache was a child, she was abused by French writer Jean Genet, who was a friend of her mother. The abuse led her to drug use and prostitution between Paris and New York in the 1970s.

== Career ==
=== Film and television ===
In the 1970s and early 1980s, Achache worked as an actress under the name Carole Lange in films such as Guy Gilles's Earth Light (1970), José Giovanni's The Gypsy (1975), Costa-Gavras's Special Section (1975), Jeanne Moreau's Lumière (1976), Joseph Losey's Mr. Klein (1976), Claude Sautet's Mado (1976), Yves Boisset's Le Juge Fayard dit Le Shériff (1977), Jacques Rouffio's Violette & François (1977), Georges Lautner's Death of a Corrupt Man (1977), and Laurent Heynemann's The Bit Between the Teeth (1979). And on the television series Le tourbillon des jours (1979), and Les 400 coups de Virginie (1980).

She also worked as a still photographer in films such as Other People's Money (1978) by Christian de Chalonge, A Week's Vacation (1980) by Bertrand Tavernier, The Trout (1982) by Joseph Losey, and Un soir au club (2009) by Jean Achache.

=== Books ===
In 2002, Achache published her first novel, L'Indienne de Cortés (English: Cortés' Indian Woman), about La Malinche, a Nahua woman who accompanied Spanish conquistador Hernán Cortés throughout his conquest of the Aztec Empire and later became his mistress.

Her second novel, La plage de Trouville (English: Trouville Beach), was published in 2008 and follows the story of the painting of the same name by Jacques Mauny, which belonged to Achache's family and was stolen by the Nazis around 1943.

In 2011, Achache published Fille de (English: Daughter of), about her relationship with her mother.

Achache also published two photography books, Chantiers en cours (English: Work in Progress) in 2004, and Des fleurs (English: Flowers) in 2006.

== Personal life ==
Achache was married to French director and screenwriter Jean Achache, with whom she had two children, a son and a daughter, film director Mona Achache, born on 18 March 1981.

== Death ==
Achache died in Paris on 1 March 2016 at the age of 63. Her death was ruled as suicide by hanging.

== In popular culture ==
In 2023, Achache was portrayed by French actress Marion Cotillard in the biographical docudrama Little Girl Blue, directed by her daughter, Mona Achache.

== Bibliography ==
=== Novels ===
- L'Indienne de Cortés (2002)
- La plage de Trouville (2008)
- Fille de (2011)

=== Photography ===
- Chantiers en cours (2004)
- Des fleurs (2006)

== Filmography ==
=== Actress ===
==== Feature films ====
Year	Title	Role	Notes
1970	Earth Light	Jeanne	as Carole Lange
1975	The Gypsy		as Carole Lange
1975	Special Section		as Carole Lange
1976	Lumière	Carole	as Carole Lange
1976	Mr. Klein		as Carole Lange
1976	Mado		as Carole Lange
1977	Le Juge Fayard dit Le Shériff	Cathy Davoust	as Carole Lange
1977	Violette & François		as Carole Lange
1977	Death of a Corrupt Man	The locker room girl	as Carole Lange
1979	The Bit Between the Teeth	The employee Chazerand	as Carole Lange

==== Television ====
Year	Title	Role	Notes
1979	Le tourbillon des jours	Marie	TV Series; 6 episodes (as Carole Lange)
1980	Les 400 coups de Virginie	Chip costumer	TV Series; 1 episode (as Carole Lange)

=== Still photographer ===
Year	Title	Notes
1978	Other People's Money	Directed by Christian de Chalonge (as Carole Lange)
1980	A Week's Vacation	Directed by Bertrand Tavernier (as Carole Lange)
1982	The Trout	Directed by Joseph Losey (as Carole Lange)
2009	Un soir au club	Directed by Jean Achache
