= A Way You'll Never Be =

Short story by Ernest Hemingway

"A Way You'll Never Be" is a 1933 short story by Ernest Hemingway, published by Charles Scribner in the short story collection Winner Take Nothing. It features the character Nick Adams as he recovers from a traumatic head wound.

== Synopsis ==
Nick Adams has been wounded in Italy during World War I and is suffering from shell-shock, or post-traumatic stress syndrome. He is plagued by nightmares, in which he sees the eyes of an Austrian soldier shooting at him, a yellow house, and a river. Nick's friend, the Italian Captain Paravicini, believes that Nick's head wound should have been trepanned; he worries about Nick's bouts of "craziness." One hot summer day, Nick bicycles from the village of Fornaci to Captain Paravicini's encampment. He sees many bloated corpses and scattered pieces of paper. When Nick reaches camp, an Italian second lieutenant questions Nick's identification papers before Paravicini intervenes and coaxes Nick to lie down and rest before he returns to Fornaci. He shows concern about Nick's mental state. After lying down and dreaming, Nick leaves Paravicini's encampment and goes to find his bike.

== Reception ==
Hemingway listed "A Way You'll Never Be" as one of his seven favorite of his short stories, but the collection Winner Take Nothing received generally negative reviews from contemporary critics and the short story itself was largely ignored. The short story was published in 1933.
