= Jean Achache =

French film director

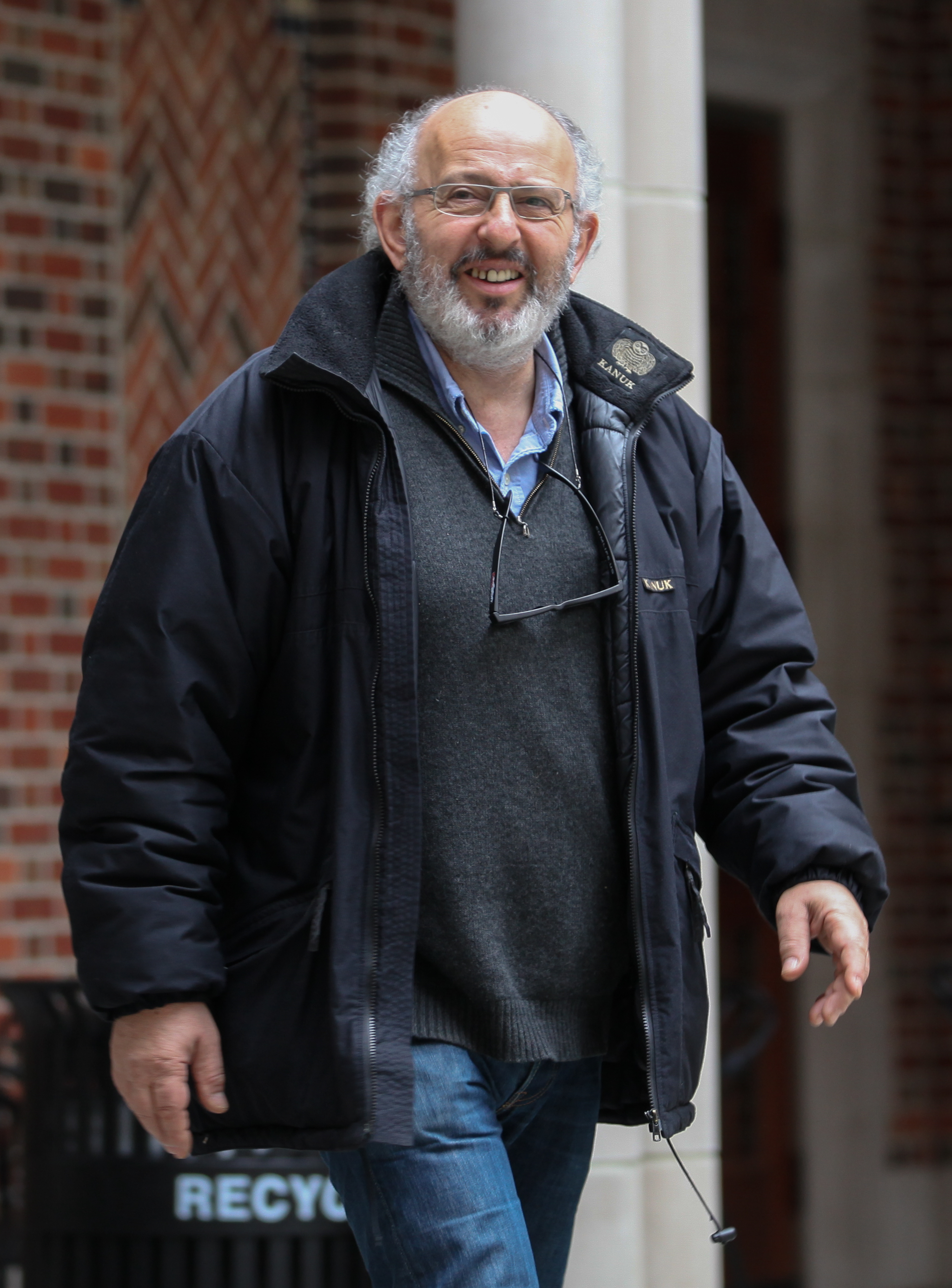
- Born: 1952 (age 73–74); France
- Occupations: Film director; screenwriter; film producer; writer
- Years active: 1974–present
- Spouse: Carole Achache (m. 2016, died 2016)
- Children: Mona Achache

Jean Achache (born 1952) is a French director, screenwriter, film producer, and writer.

== Biography ==
Jean Achache began his career as a filmmaker in the mid-1970s alongside Robert Enrico as an assistant director for Le Vieux Fusil and The Secret. In the eighties, he collaborated with Bertrand Tavernier on films like Death Watch or A Sunday in the Country. Jean Achache then turned to the realization of his own works through clips, documentaries like Diabolo's Workshop with Terry Gilliam and films like the adaptation of the novel Un soir au Club by Christian Gailly in 2009.

In 2006, he published his first novel, Juste une nuit at Éditions du Masque. ISBN 2-7024-3296-4

== Personal life ==
Achache was married to French writer and photographer Carole Achache, with whom he had a daughter, Mona Achache, born on 18 March 1981.

In 2023, Achache portrayed himself in a biographical docudrama about Carole Achache, Little Girl Blue, which was directed by their daughter, Mona Achache.

== Filmography ==
=== Assistant director ===
- 1974: The Secret
- 1975: Le Vieux Fusil

=== Director ===
==== Cinema ====
- 1994: Les deux Amants (short film)
- 1994: 3000 scénarios contre un virus (short film)
- 2004: Marcel !
- 2006: La guerre du Nil aura-t-elle lieu ? (documentary)
- 2009: Diabolo'S Workshop (documentary)
- 2009: Un soir au club

==== Clips ====
- 1989: Le petit Train, Les Rita Mitsouko
- 1990: Regarde les riches, Patricia Kaas
- 1990: Au Tourniquet des grands cafés, Jean Guidoni
- 1990: Des fleurs pour Salinger, Indochine
- 1991: Punishment Park, Indochine
- 1997: Love in Motion, Peter Kingsbery

=== Producer ===
- 1987: Waiting for the moon

=== Screenwriter ===
- 2009: Un soir au club
