= Mona Achache =

French-Moroccan film director and screenwriter

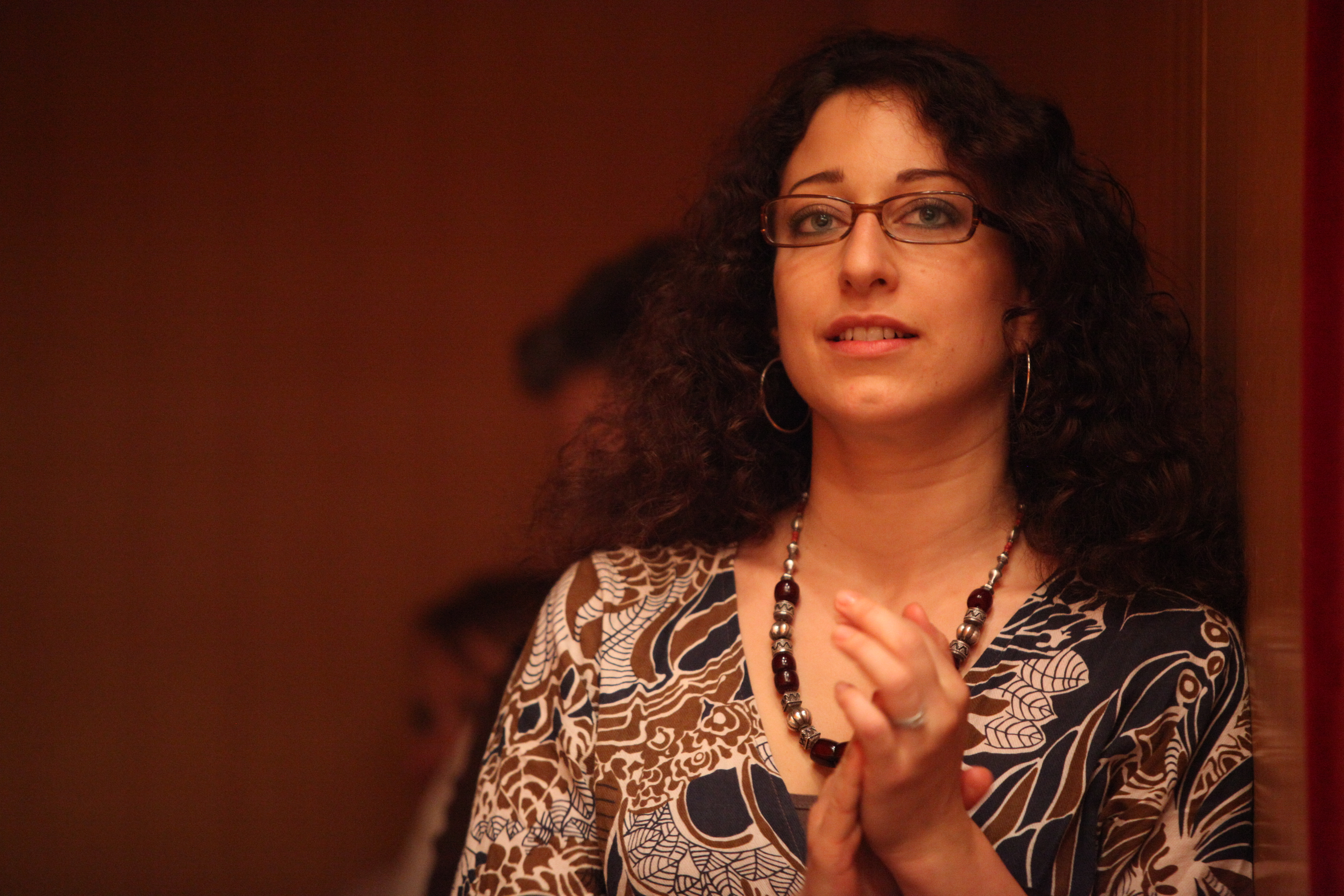
- Achache in 2010
- Born: Mona Achache; 18 March 1981 (age 45); Paris, France
- Occupations: Film director; screenwriter; actress
- Years active: 2003–present
- Spouse: Patrick Blossier
- Children: 3
- Parents: Jean Achache (father); Carole Achache (mother)

Mona Achache (born 18 March 1981) is a French-Moroccan film director, screenwriter, and actress. She wrote and directed the feature films The Hedgehog (2009), Les Gazelles (2014), Valiant Hearts (2021), and Little Girl Blue (2023). She also directed the Netflix documentary The Women and the Murderer (2021). In 2024, she was nominated for the César Award for Best Documentary Film for Little Girl Blue.

== Early life ==
Achache was born in Paris, France on 18 March 1981. Her mother was French writer and photographer Carole Achache, and her father is French director and screenwriter Jean Achache. She has a brother. Her maternal grandparents were French writer Monique Lange, and French science historian Jean-Jacques Salomon. Her maternal grandmother was born Jewish and later converted to Catholicism. Her maternal great-grandfather, Robert Lange, was a French journalist and politician. Spanish writer Juan Goytisolo was her maternal step-grandfather. Her paternal grandmother, Suzanne Achache–Wiznitzer, was an Austrian-Jewish psychoanalyst who survived the Holocaust as a child while hidden in the Château de Chambord in France during World War II.

Achache received a literary and theatrical education.

== Career ==
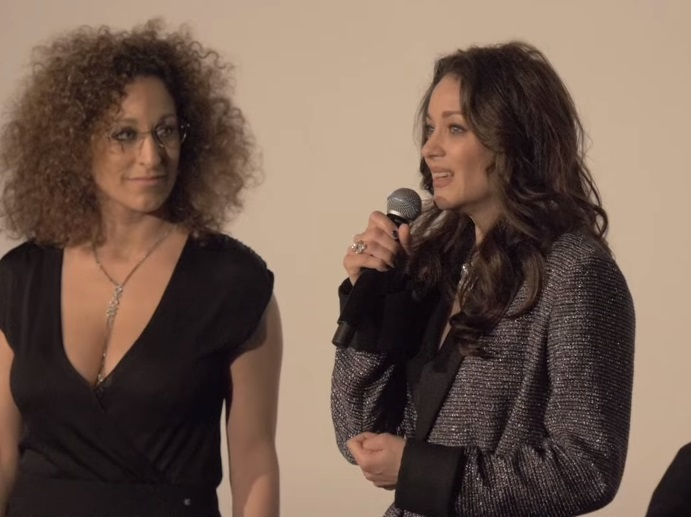
Achache and Marion Cotillard during the premiere of Little Girl Blue at the 2023 Cannes Film Festival.

Achache worked as an assistant director for Michel Boujenah in his 2003 film Father and Sons, and later began screenwriting for fictional and documentary films. She became a mother at the age of 20 and directed a documentary film about childbirth, Alma et les autres, released in 2004, which became a reference in more than 500 maternity wards in France during birth preparation sessions.

In 2005, she wrote and directed the short film Suzanne, based on the story of her grandmother, who witnessed her father being arrested by the Nazis when she was 13 years old.

In 2009, Achache wrote and directed her first feature film, The Hedgehog, based on the novel The Elegance of the Hedgehog by Muriel Barbery. That same year, she had a small part in the French-Greek drama film Eden Is West, directed by Costa-Gavras. In 2013, she co-wrote the screenplay of the comedy film Les gamins, directed by Anthony Marciano.

In 2014, Achache wrote and directed her second feature film, the comedy Les Gazelles.

In 2021, she wrote and directed her third feature film, the World War II drama Valiant Hearts, starring Camille Cottin, based on the real-life story of her grandmother, Suzanne Achache–Wiznitzer, who was a Jewish child placed in foster care to escape the Holocaust. That same year, she also directed the Netflix documentary The Women and the Murderer, about French serial killer Guy Georges.

In 2023, Achache wrote, directed, and played herself in the French docudrama Little Girl Blue. The film tells the story of her mother, Carole Achache, who was portrayed by Marion Cotillard. The film made its world premiere at the 2023 Cannes Film Festival in the Special Screenings section and was nominated for the L'Œil d'or award, and for the César Award for Best Documentary Film.

== Personal life ==
In the early 2000s, Achache was in a relationship with director Christophe Ruggia. She later revealed that their relationship ended after he confessed to her that he had fallen in love with and inappropriately touched actress Adèle Haenel, who was at that time underage. This confession corroborated Haenel's account of sexual abuse at the hands of Ruggia.

Achache is married to French cinematographer Patrick Blossier. She has three children, two daughters and one son.

Achache is a member of the French gender equality group Collectif 50/50.

== Filmography ==
=== Feature films ===
Year	Title	Role	Notes
2003	Father and Sons	Assistant director	Directed by Michel Boujenah
2009	The Hedgehog	Director and screenwriter	
2013	Les gamins	Screenwriter	Directed by Anthony Marciano
2014	Les Gazelles	Director and screenwriter	
2021	Valiant Hearts	Director and screenwriter	
2023	Little Girl Blue	Director, screenwriter and actress	

=== Short films ===
Year	Title	Role	Notes
2005	Suzanne	Director and screenwriter	Based on the story of Suzanne Achache-Wiznitzer
2008	Wawa	Director and screenwriter	
2016	Speed Dating	Director	Campaign against domestic violence for France's Fondation des Femmes

=== Documentaries ===
Year	Title	Role	Notes
2004	Alma et les autres	Director	
2016	Grandmas Project	Director and cinematographer	Documentary web-series; episode "Marillenknödel"
2021	The Women and the Murderer	Director	Netflix documentary

=== Television ===
Year	Title	Role	Notes
2012	Bankable	Director	Television film
2015–2016	Defendant	Director	Television series (3 episodes)
2015–2017	Marjorie	Director	Television series (3 episodes)
2019	Osmosis	Director	Television series (2 episodes)
2019–2020	Balthazar	Director	Television series (4 episodes)
2022	Champion	Director	Television film
2022–2023	HPI Haut Potentiel Intellectuel	Director	Television series (4 episodes)

=== Actress ===
Year	Title	Role	Notes
2009	Eden Is West	Marie-Lou	Directed by Costa-Gavras
2011	Dans la tourmente	Charlier's wife	Directed by Christophe Ruggia
2023	Little Girl Blue	Herself	Also director and screenwriter

== Awards and nominations ==
Year	Award / Festival	Category	Work	Result	Ref(s)
2005	Avanca Film Festival	Best Film - International Competition	Suzanne	Nominated	
2005	Giffoni Film Festival	Best Short Film	Suzanne	Nominated	
2006	Ebensee Festival of Nations	Silver Bear	Suzanne	Won	
2009	Cairo International Film Festival	Best Director	The Hedgehog	Won	
2009	Cairo International Film Festival	FIPRESCI Prize	The Hedgehog	Won	
2009	Cairo International Film Festival	Silver Pyramid	The Hedgehog	Won	
2009	Cairo International Film Festival	Special Award	The Hedgehog	Won	
2009	Cairo International Film Festival	Golden Pyramid	The Hedgehog	Nominated	
2009	Valladolid International Film Festival	Best Film - Audience Award	The Hedgehog	Won	
2009	Valladolid International Film Festival	Golden Spike - Best Film	The Hedgehog	Nominated	
2009	Women Film Critics Circle	Best Foreign Film by or About Women	The Hedgehog	Won	
2010	Seattle International Film Festival	Best Film	The Hedgehog	Won	
2010	Seattle International Film Festival	Best Director	The Hedgehog	Runner-up	
2011	Palm Springs International Film Festival	Best Narrative Feature	The Hedgehog	Runner-up	
2011	Washington DC Filmfest	Audience Award	The Hedgehog	Won	
2012	Chlotrudis Award	Best Adapted Screenplay	The Hedgehog	Nominated	
2023	Cannes Film Festival	L'Œil d'or	Little Girl Blue	Nominated	
2023	CineLibri	Best Documentary	Little Girl Blue	Nominated	
2023	Rencontres du cinéma francophone en Beaujolais	Jury Award	Little Girl Blue	Nominated	
2023	Festival international du cinéma francophone en Acadie	Best Medium or Feature-Length Documentary	Little Girl Blue	Nominated	
2023	Prix Louis-Delluc	Best Film	Little Girl Blue	Nominated	
2024	Lumière Awards	Best Documentary	Little Girl Blue	Nominated	
2024	Paris Film Critics Association Awards	Best Documentary	Little Girl Blue	Nominated	
2024	César Awards	Best Documentary Film	Little Girl Blue	Nominated	
2024	Trophées du Film français	Scam Award for Best Documentary	Little Girl Blue	Nominated	
