= The Elegance of the Hedgehog =

2006 novel by Muriel Barbery

- First-edition cover
- Author: Muriel Barbery
- Original title: L'Élégance du hérisson
- Translator: Alison Anderson
- Language: French
- Genre: Novel
- Publisher: Gallimard
- Publication date: August 2006
- Publication place: France
- English publication date: September 2008
- Media type: Print (hardback and paperback)
- Pages: 359 pp
- ISBN: 2-07-078093-7
- OCLC: 71336412
- LC Class: PQ2662.A6523 E44 2006

The Elegance of the Hedgehog (French: L'Élégance du hérisson) is a novel by the French novelist and philosophy teacher Muriel Barbery. The book follows events in the life of a concierge, Renée Michel, whose deliberately concealed intelligence is uncovered by an unstable but intellectually precocious girl named Paloma Josse. Paloma is the daughter of an upper-class family living in the Parisian hôtel particulier where Renée works.

Featuring a number of erudite characters, The Elegance of the Hedgehog is full of allusions to literary works, music, films, and paintings. It incorporates themes relating to philosophy, class consciousness, and personal conflict. The events and ideas of the novel are presented through the thoughts and reactions, interleaved throughout the novel, of two narrators, Renée and Paloma. The changes of narrator are marked by switches of typeface. In the case of Paloma, the narration takes the form of her written journal entries and other philosophical reflections; Renée's story is also told in the first person but more novelistically and in the present tense.

First released in August 2006 by Gallimard, the novel became a publishing success in France the following year, selling over two million copies. It has been translated into more than forty languages, and published in numerous countries outside France, including the United Kingdom (Gallic Books, London) and the United States (Europa Editions, New York), and has attracted critical praise.

== Plot ==
The story revolves mainly around the characters of Renée Michel and Paloma Josse, residents of an upper-middle class Left Bank apartment building at 7 Rue de Grenelle – one of the most elegant streets in Paris. Divided into eight luxury apartments, all occupied by distinctly bourgeois families, the building has a courtyard and private garden.

The widow Renée is a concierge who has supervised the building for 27 years. She is an autodidact in literature and philosophy, but conceals it to keep her job and, she believes, to avoid the condemnation of the building's tenants. Likewise, she wants to be alone to avoid her tenants' curiosity. She effects this by pretending to indulge in low-quality food and television, while in her back room she actually enjoys high-quality food, listens to opera, and reads works by Leo Tolstoy and Edmund Husserl. Her perspective is that "[t]o be poor, ugly and, moreover, intelligent condemns one, in our society, to a dark and disillusioned life, a condition one ought to accept at an early age".

Twelve-year-old Paloma lives on the fifth floor with her parents and sister, whom she considers snobs. A precocious girl, she hides her intelligence to avoid exclusion at school. Dismayed by the privileged people around her, she decides that life is meaningless, and that unless she can find something worth living for, beyond the "vacuousness of bourgeois existence", she will commit suicide on 16 June, her thirteenth birthday. Planning to burn down the apartment before dying, she also steals her mother's pills. For the time being she journals her observations of the outside world, including her perceptions of Renée.

Paloma is the only tenant who suspects Renée's refinement, and for most of the novel, the two "cross each other but don't see each other", in the words of Time Out reviewer Elisabeth Vincentelli. Although they share interests in philosophy and literature, nothing happens between them until the death of a celebrated restaurant critic who had been living upstairs. A cultured Japanese businessman named Kakuro Ozu, whom Renée and Paloma befriend, then takes a room in the same apartment building. Ozu comes to share Paloma's fascination with Renée: that the concierge has the "same simple refinement as the hedgehog".

Toward the end of the novel, Renée comes out of her internal seclusion, teaching young Paloma that not all adults pursue vanity at the expense of their intelligence and humanity. However, only shortly after Renée realizes that the beauty of life and her connections with the world make life worth living, she dies in the same way as Roland Barthes; she is struck down by a laundry van. This leaves Paloma and Ozu devastated but leads Paloma not to commit suicide.

== Characters ==
=== Renée Michel ===
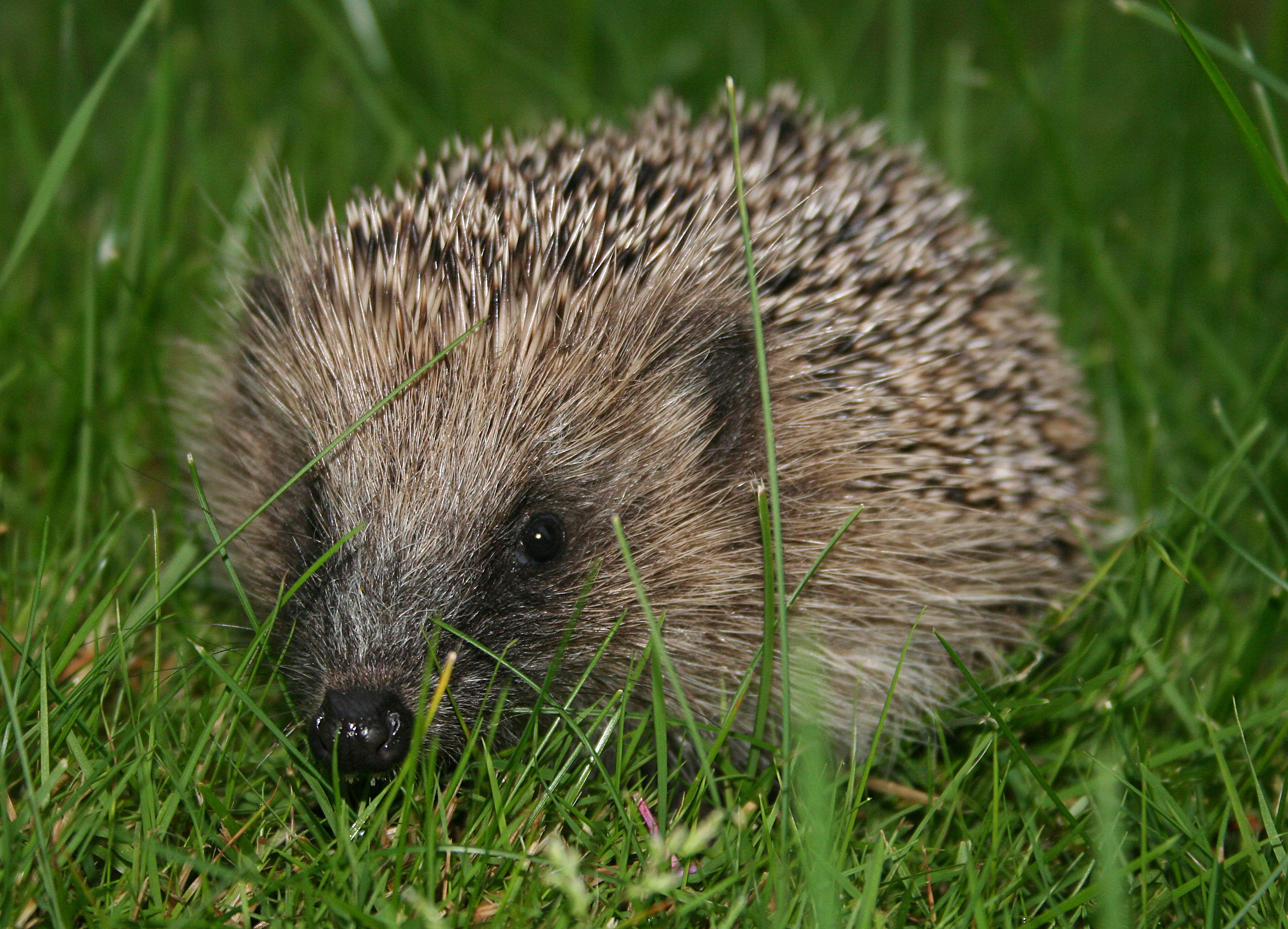
Paloma refers to Renée as having the elegance of the hedgehog.

Renée Michel is a 54-year-old widowed concierge. She has never been to college because she considers herself to always have been poor, discreet, and of no significance. Renée, however is self-taught; she reads works of the German philosopher Immanuel Kant and Russian writer Leo Tolstoy (and even names her cat "Leo"), disdains the philosophy of Edmund Husserl, adores 17th-century Dutch paintings, likes Japanese art-house films by Yasujirō Ozu, and listens to the music of composers Henry Purcell and Gustav Mahler.

Renée, who conceals her true self to conform to the lowly image of typical concierges, introduces herself as "a widow, short, ugly, chubby", with "bunions on my feet and, on certain difficult mornings, it seems, the breath of a mammoth". Her outward appearance is summarized by The Guardian reviewer Ian Samson as "prickly and bunioned". When Paloma eventually discovers Renée's identity, she describes the latter in her journal as having the "elegance of the hedgehog"—although like the spines of the hedgehog, she is covered in quills and prickly, within, she has in the words of the English translation of the book quoted by Viv Groskop "the same simple refinement as the hedgehog: a deceptively indolent little creature, fiercely solitary—and terribly elegant".

=== Paloma Josse ===
Paloma Josse, a precocious soon to be thirteen-year-old, belongs to one of the conventional families living in the posh apartment building where Renée works. Daughter of an important parliamentarian father (a former government minister), and a Flaubert-quoting mother, Paloma has a penchant for absurdism. She regards her sister's scholarship as "cold and trivial" and deems her mother's culture as conventional and useless. Paloma herself values Japanese works, and reads manga, haiku, and tanka. She keeps two diaries, one called "Journal of the Movement of the World" to record her observations of the world around her, and the other called "Profound Thoughts" to record her many and wide-ranging reflections on art, poetry, people and herself. She is introspective and truly kind, though she tries her best to avoid the inquisition of others. She understands many facets of the world that are unseen by others, and deeply understands the way the world works, and the many perils and pitfalls of adulthood and the many hypocrisies of modern society. Therefore, Paloma resolves, in a non-melodramatic way, to commit suicide. However, a drastic plot twist at the end of the tale opens to her an amazing new truth: beauty, that provides meaning to our lives.

=== Minor characters ===
Other characters developed by Barbery in the novel include Kakuro Ozu, the cultured Japanese businessman, and Manuela, a friend of Renée. Ozu, a tenant, shares Paloma's fascination with Renée's masked intelligence and brings her out of her shell (and also happens to set the entire book in forward motion), while Manuela is responsible for cleaning the apartments' toilets and is Renée's only real friend.

== Content ==
=== Style and character development ===
Barbery developed the character of Renée because she was "inspired by the idea of a reserved, cultured concierge who turned stereotypes on their head and at the same time created a compelling comic effect"; for the author, Renée "opened the door on a kind of social criticism". In an interview with Time magazine, Barbery added that she created characters "who love the things [she does], and who allowed [her] to celebrate that through them". Barbery dedicates the book to her husband, Stéphane, a sociologist, with whom she wrote the book.

The novel's two narrators, Renée and Paloma, alternate in each mostly short chapter, although the former dominates throughout. The novel consists of the "diaries" of the protagonists, and the heading styles and fonts change as it develops, signalling the change of the narrators' character.

Most critics considered Barbery's narrative presentation to be essayistic; the individual chapters are more akin to essays than fiction, as The New York Times' Caryn James expresses it, "so carefully build[ing] in explanations for the literary and philosophical references that she seems to be assessing what a mass audience needs". The early pages of the novel contain a short critique by Renée on the topic of phenomenology.

=== Themes ===
Barbery incorporates several themes into the novel. References to philosophy, for instance, abound throughout, getting increasingly dense as the story progresses. Barbery confesses to having "followed a long, boring course of studies in philosophy", and comments that "I expected it to help me understand better that which surrounds me: but it didn't work out that way. Literature has taught me more. I was interested in exploring the bearing philosophy could really have on one's life, and how. I wanted to illuminate this process. That's where the desire to anchor philosophy to a story, a work of fiction, was born: to give it more meaning, make it more physically real, and render it, perhaps, even entertaining."

Themes of class consciousness and conflict are also present in the book. Critics interpreted the stance the novel took against French class-based discrimination and hypocrisy as quite radical, although some French critics found that this made the novel an unsubtle satire of fading social stereotypes. There are also literary allusions in the novel, referencing comic books, movies, music, and paintings.

== Publication ==
The Elegance of the Hedgehog was first published in August 2006 under the title L'élégance du hérisson by the leading French publisher Éditions Gallimard. The initial print run of the novel was 4000 copies, but by the following year, over a million had been produced. On 25 September 2007, Gallimard released the fiftieth reprint of the novel.

The French Voice program extended help to Gallimard in the translation of the novel to other languages and publication outside France. In partnership with the PEN American Center, French Voice funds the translation and publication of up to ten contemporary French and Francophone works each year. The Elegance of the Hedgehog was one of 30 works chosen between 2005 and 2008 by the organization, spearheaded by a committee in its selection process of professional experts.

The novel's translation rights have been sold to 31 countries, and it has been translated to a half-dozen languages. Novelist Alison Anderson translated L'Élégance du hérisson into English as The Elegance of the Hedgehog, and this version was released in September 2008 by Europa Editions. Europa is an independent press based in Italy and New York, which focuses on translated works. In the United Kingdom, the rights were bought by Gallic Books, a publisher specializing in French translations.

== Reception ==
An acclaimed literary work, The Elegance of the Hedgehog has been considered by critics and press alike as a publishing phenomenon. Upon the novel's release, it had received significant support from booksellers. The novel has earned Barbery the 2007 French Booksellers Prize, the 2007 Brive-la-Gaillarde Reader's Prize, and the Prix du Rotary International in France. The Elegance of the Hedgehog has been adapted into the film Le hérisson (2009).

The novel was a best-seller and long-seller in France, amassing sales of 1.2 million copies in hardback alone. It stayed on the country's best-seller for 102 straight weeks from its publication, longer than American novelist Dan Brown's best-selling books. According to reviewer Viv Groskop, the philosophical element in the novel partly explains its appeal in France, where philosophy remains a compulsory subject. Anderson agreed, commenting that the novel became popular in France because it is "a story where people manage to transcend their class barriers". The novel also received a warm response in Korea, and sold over 400,000 copies in Italy. The release of the novel helped increase the sales of Barbery's first novel, Une Gourmandise.

A week after the novel was published in the United Kingdom,The Guardian ran an article about French best-sellers published in English, focusing on The Elegance of the Hedgehog. In it, writer Alison Flood contended that "fiction in translation is not an easy sell to Brits, and French fiction is perhaps the hardest sell of all". Promotions buyer Jonathan Ruppin predicted that the novel would struggle to gain a readership in the United Kingdom because, according to him, in the UK market "the plot is what people want more than anything else" and the novel's storyline is not its central aspect.

=== Critical reviews ===
The Elegance of the Hedgehog was well received by critics. In the earliest known review, for the Italian newspaper La Repubblica, Maurizio Bono writes that "[t]he formula that made more than half a million readers in France fall in love with [The Elegance of the Hedgehog] has, among other ingredients: intelligent humor, fine sentiments, an excellent literary and philosophical backdrop, taste that is sophisticated but substantial". French magazine Elle reviewer Natalie Aspesi pronounced it one of "the most exhilarating and extraordinary novels in recent years". Aspesi, however, tagged the novel's title as "most curious and least appealing". Praising the novel in his review for The Guardian, Ian Samson wrote that "The Elegance of the Hedgehog aspires to be great and pretends to philosophy: it is, at least, charming." In an earlier review in the same paper, Groskop opined that the novel is a "profound but accessible book ... which elegantly treads the line between literary and commercial fiction". She added that "clever, informative and moving, it is essentially a crash course in philosophy interwoven with a platonic love story". A review in The Telegraph conjectured that "[i]f [the novel were] a piece of furniture, it would be an IKEA bestseller: popular, but not likely to be passed down the generations".

A review in The Times Literary Supplement went further, calling the book "pretentious and cynical, with barely any story. It reads more like a tract than a novel, but lacks even a tract's certainty of purpose. The characters are problematic: most are puppets, and those that aren’t are stereotypes".

Michael Dirda of The Washington Post complimented Barbery, saying, "Certainly, the intelligent Muriel Barbery has served readers well by giving us the gently satirical, exceptionally winning and inevitably bittersweet Elegance of the Hedgehog." Louise McCready of The New York Observer praised Anderson's translation of the novel as "smooth and accurate". Caryn James of The New York Times hailed the novel as "studied yet appealing commercial hit", adding that it "belongs to a distinct subgenre: the accessible book that flatters readers with its intellectual veneer". Los Angeles Times' Susan Salter Reynolds wrote that "[The Elegance of the Hedgehog] is a high-wire performance; its characters teeter on the surreal edge of normalcy. Their efforts to conceal their true natures, the pressures of the solitary mind, make the book hum".

== Film adaptation ==
The novel was adapted into a film The Hedgehog (Le hérisson) released in France in July 2009, starring Josiane Balasko as Renée Michel, Garance Le Guillermic as Paloma Josse, and Togo Igawa as Kakuro Ozu, with a score by Gabriel Yared. The rights for the film were bought by NeoClassics Film and it was released by the company in the US on 19 August. Its reception at festivals was positive and it won the Filmfest DC 2011, the Best of Fest Palm Springs 2011, the Seattle International Film Festival 2010, and the 2010 Col-Coa Film Festival. Moira Macdonald of The Seattle Times called it "Whimsical and touching... Mona Achache's adaptation is wistful perfection". Stephen Holden of The New York Times said it "suggests a sort of Gallic 'Harold and Maude'".
