= The Snows of Kilimanjaro (2011 film) =

2011 film

- Film poster
- Directed by: Robert Guédiguian
- Screenplay by: Robert Guédiguian; Jean-Louis Milesi
- Based on: "Les Pauvres Gens"; 1901 poems by Victor Hugo
- Produced by: Robert Guédiguian
- Starring: Ariane Ascaride; Jean-Pierre Darroussin; Gérard Meylan
- Cinematography: Pierre Milon
- Edited by: Bernard Sasia
- Distributed by: Diaphana Films
- Release dates: 14 May 2011 (Cannes); 16 November 2011 (France)
- Running time: 107 minutes
- Country: France
- Language: French
- Budget: €4.2 million
- Box office: $4.2 million

The Snows of Kilimanjaro (French: Les Neiges du Kilimandjaro) is a 2011 French drama film directed by Robert Guédiguian. It premiered in the Un Certain Regard section at the 2011 Cannes Film Festival. It won the audience award and the Silver Spike at the Valladolid International Film Festival.

== Plot ==
Michel (Jean-Pierre Darroussin), lives happily with Marie-Claire (Ariane Ascaride), his wife of nearly 30 years. A dedicated shop steward for CGT (General Confederation of Labour), he is charged with calling out the names in a draw in the shipyard to select who will be the 20 workers which it has been agreed will be made redundant. Though he did not need to place his own name in the draw, he did so and it is drawn, and so he becomes one of the two losing their jobs.

His fellow workers and his family organize a party for his 30th wedding anniversary and present him and his wife with travel money and a ticket to Tanzania so they can climb Mount Kilimanjaro, singing the 1960s hit song "Kilimandjaro". Raoul (Gérard Meylan), Michel's brother-in-law, workmate and fellow trade union official presents him with a treasured but long-lost comic book from Michel's childhood, which Raoul says he found in a secondhand bookshop.

Before they leave for their holiday, Michel and Marie-Claire are playing cards at home with Raoul and Raoul's wife, Denise (Marilyne Canto) and are brutally robbed by two men of the comic book and other possessions. Michel is injured while Denise becomes seriously disturbed from the trauma.

On a bus, Michel sees two children reading the stolen comic book. Following them, he recognises their older brother Christophe (Grégoire Leprince-Ringuet) as one of his fellow redundant workers. He identifies Christophe to the police and watches his arrest. Gradually, Michel and Marie-Claire discover that Christophe is caring for his two younger brothers, neglected for years by their mother.

Michel has second thoughts and wants to withdraw his accusation, but the case cannot be withdrawn. In the spirit of his hero, the French socialist leader Jean Jaurès, he decides to try to help the two younger brothers, only to discover that Marie-Claire has beaten him to it and is already secretly taking care of the children. They realise that it is their shared ideals that cement their relationship and, after arguments with their own, grown-up, children and with Raoul, they take the two boys into their home to look after them while their brother serves a long sentence. Raoul admits that he didn't find the comic book in a secondhand bookshop at all, but had stolen it from Michel when they were children.

== Cast ==
- Ariane Ascaride as Marie-Claire Marteron
- Jean-Pierre Darroussin as Michel Marteron, husband of Marie-Claire
- Gérard Meylan as Raoul, brother-in-law and childhood friend of Michel
- Marilyne Canto as Denise, Raoul's wife and younger sister of Marie-Claire
- Grégoire Leprince-Ringuet as Christophe Brunet
- Anaïs Demoustier as Flo, daughter of Marie-Claire et Michel
- Robinson Stévenin as Commissioner
- Adrien Jolivet as Gilles, son of Marie-Claire et Michel
- Karole Rocher as Christophe's mother
- Julie-Marie Parmentier as Agnès
- Pierre Niney as Waiter at the « Tintamarre » restaurant

== Story and title ==
The story, written by director Robert Guédiguian and Jean-Louis Milesi, takes its inspiration from the poem Les pauvres gens [Poor People] (How Good Are The Poor) one of the best known of Victor Hugo's poems from his three-volume poetry collection, La Légende des siècles (The Legend of the Centuries).

The title, on the other hand, is taken from the name of the song the main characters' family sings in the film: Pascal Danel's song "Kilimandjaro", known in French as Les Neiges du Kilimandjaro (The Snows of Kilimanjaro).

== Critical response ==
On Rotten Tomatoes, the film holds a rating of 100% based on 20 reviews, with an average rating of 7.17/10.

== Accolades ==
Award / Film Festival	Category	Recipients and nominees	Result
Cannes Film Festival	Prix Un certain regard		Nominated
Cabourg Film Festival	Best Director	Robert Guédiguian	Won
César Award	Best Actress	Ariane Ascaride	Nominated
Globes de Cristal Award	Best Actor	Jean-Pierre Darroussin	Nominated
Lumière Awards	Best Screenplay	Jean-Louis Milesi and Robert Guédiguian	Won
Lux Prize			Won
Valladolid International Film Festival	Audience Award		Won
Valladolid International Film Festival	Silver Spike		Won

== See also ==
- The Snows of Kilimanjaro (disambiguation)
