= Beautiful Lies (film) =

2010 film by Pierre Salvadori

- Theatrical release poster
- French: De vrais mensonges
- Directed by: Pierre Salvadori
- Screenplay by: Pierre Salvadori; Benoît Graffin
- Dialogue by: Pierre Salvadori
- Produced by: Philippe Martin
- Starring: Audrey Tautou; Nathalie Baye; Sami Bouajila; Stéphanie Lagarde; Judith Chemla; Daniel Duval
- Cinematography: Gilles Henry
- Edited by: Isabelle Devinck
- Music by: Philippe Eidel
- Production companies: Les Films Pelléas; TF1 Films Production; Tovo Films
- Distributed by: Pathé
- Release date: 8 December 2010
- Running time: 104 minutes
- Country: France
- Language: French
- Budget: €12.4 million
- Box office: $6 million

Beautiful Lies (French: De vrais mensonges, lit. 'True Lies'), also released as Full Treatment, is a 2010 French romantic comedy film directed by Pierre Salvadori, who co-wrote the screenplay with Benoît Graffin. It stars Audrey Tautou, Nathalie Baye, Sami Bouajila, Stéphanie Lagarde, Judith Chemla and Daniel Duval. The plot follows a hairdresser who, after receiving an anonymous love letter from an employee, retypes it and sends it anonymously to her depressed mother in an attempt to cheer her up.

== Plot ==
Émilie, co-owner of a hair salon in a French seaside town, receives an anonymous love letter from her employee Jean, the salon's shy handyman. Unimpressed, she throws the letter away but later retypes it and sends it anonymously to her mother Maddy, who has been depressed since her husband left her for a younger woman. After witnessing Jean arguing in Chinese with two Chinese clients, Émilie learns that he is a Harvard graduate and polyglot who previously worked as a UNESCO translator; he explains that he took the handyman job because he was fired from UNESCO after suffering a nervous breakdown. Feeling threatened by Jean's high level of education, Émilie struggles to assign menial tasks to him and only communicates with him through her co-workers.

Maddy, feeling instantly reinvigorated by the love letter, eagerly awaits a new letter from her secret admirer, prompting Émilie to write another anonymous letter to her mother, but Maddy finds it uninspired and emotionless and becomes convinced that her admirer has fallen out of love with her. To avoid Jean, Émilie sends him to run errands, including posting the mail. When he runs out of stamps, he personally delivers a new anonymous fake love letter from Émilie to Maddy, unaware of its contents. Maddy sees Jean placing the letter through her letterbox and follows him back to the salon. She deduces that he is her secret admirer and, despite Émilie's protests, flirts with him.

That evening, Émilie, still unaware that Jean is the author of the original love letter, visits him and, after explaining everything to him, offers to pay him to pretend to be Maddy's admirer and take her out on a few dates, but he refuses. Upset, Émilie writes Maddy an anonymous letter spurning her. The next day, Maddy goes to the salon and confronts Jean with the letter, slapping him in the face before storming off. Knowing that Émilie wrote the letter, Jean follows Maddy home and attempts to explain himself, but she rebuffs him. After Maddy receives a call from her ex-husband, who reveals that his current wife is pregnant, she breaks down in tears and is consoled by Jean.

Jean agrees to a date with Maddy. Afterwards, Maddy calls Émilie and cheerfully discusses the date; when Maddy mentions that Jean recited the final portion of the first letter from memory, Émilie realizes that he was the one who wrote the anonymous letter. The next day, Jean shows up drunk at the salon and flippantly takes €600 from the cash register as payment for taking Maddy out. Émilie confronts him about his unpleasant and cynical behavior when she knows he is the opposite. She apologizes to Jean for forcing him to court her mother and promises to tell her the truth. He announces he is leaving town the next day, and they bid each other a tearful goodbye.

Having overheard Émilie and Jean's conversation at the salon, Maddy falls out with Émilie. Feigning ignorance, Maddy invites Jean over for a romantic dinner and hands him an envelope of money, lying that Émilie left it for him. Maddy later seduces Jean and they kiss, which is witnessed by Émilie who is standing outside her mother's house. The next day, Jean moves to Paris.

Some time later, Maddy receives an invitation from her ex-husband to his art exhibition in Paris. Knowing that Émilie will also be there, Maddy sends Jean an anonymous letter inviting him to the exhibition. Jean, thinking that the letter is from Émilie, attends the exhibition and asks her if she wrote the letter. Seeing that Maddy is watching them from a distance, Émilie replies that she did write it, and the two kiss.

== Cast ==
- Audrey Tautou as Émilie
- Nathalie Baye as Maddy
- Sami Bouajila as Jean
- Stéphanie Lagarde as Sylvia, Émilie's partner in the hair salon "Les intondables"
- Judith Chemla as Paulette, the salon's socially awkward receptionist
- Daniel Duval as Émilie's father

== Production ==
Filming commenced on 8 June 2009 and wrapped on 5 August. Beautiful Lies was mostly shot in Sète, except for two days spent in Paris.

== Reception ==
On the review aggregator website Rotten Tomatoes, the film holds an approval rating of 39% based on 28 reviews, with an average rating of 5/10.

Patrick Peters of Empire rated the film three out of five stars, writing, "Despite the best efforts of Audrey Tautou and Nathalie Baye, Pierre Salvadori's love triangle romp struggles to overcome its core contrivances and chauvinism. ... [Sami] Bouajila proves more genial, but even his surprise secret can't rescue this histrionic romcom from its garish vulgarity." Tim Robey of The Daily Telegraph, also giving the film three out of five stars, described it as "frisky and watchable, at least until the untangling of feelings reveals there's little but contrivance keeping it afloat."

Xan Brooks of The Guardian gave the film two out of five stars, stating, "Audrey Tautou plays stupid cupid in this excitable comedy, a cut-price, candy-coated update on Jane Austen's Emma that bounces along the marina at Sete with its blood sugar through the roof." Brooks added that Bouajila was the only actor who "emerges with his dignity relatively intact." Trevor Johnston of Time Out London also awarded the film two out of five stars and commented that "Gallic star power makes this creaky romcom tolerable but best not to set your expectations too high", concluding that "the script grinds its way through sundry reversals, initial jollity giving way to plodding rigmarole."

Jordan Mintzer of Variety wrote, "Despite a cast toplined by Audrey Tautou ... this long-winded assembly of quid pro quos and borderline sexist banter goes only to the most predictable places." TVNZ's Darren Bevan gave the film six out of ten and commented, "Beautiful Lies is a piece of French fluff; beautifully shot in a bright French town – it has all the breeziness within but is insubstantial and instantly forgettable." Nigel Andrews of the Financial Times rated the film one of out five stars and wrote it is "full of sub-Marivaux comic contrivances, ersatz Gallic charm – the kind you can squeeze from a tube – and whimsical improbability."

== See also ==
- List of French films of 2010
