= Valiant Hearts (film) =

2021 film by Mona Achache

- Theatrical release poster
- French: Cœurs vaillants
- Directed by: Mona Achache
- Written by: Mona Achache; Christophe Offenstein; Jean Cottin; Anne Berest; Valérie Zenatti
- Produced by: Jean Cottin
- Starring: Camille Cottin
- Cinematography: Isarr Eiriksson
- Edited by: Beatrice Herminie
- Music by: Benoit Rault
- Production companies: Les Films du Cap; Orson Films; Scope Pictures
- Distributed by: BAC Films
- Release dates: 1 October 2021 (War On Screen); 11 May 2022 (France)
- Running time: 85 minutes
- Countries: France; Belgium
- Language: French
- Budget: €3,7 million

Valiant Hearts (French: Cœurs vaillants) is a 2021 World War II drama film written and directed by Mona Achache from a screenplay she co-wrote with Christophe Offenstein, Jean Cottin, Anne Berest, and Valérie Zenatti, starring Camille Cottin. The film is a co-production between France and Belgium and it is based on the real-life story of Achache's grandmother, Suzanne Achache–Wiznitzer, who was a Jewish child placed in foster care during World War II to escape the Holocaust. The film made its world premiere at the War On Screen Film Festival on 1 October 2021. It was released theatrically in France by BAC Films on 11 May 2022.

== Plot ==
In 1942 during World War II, six Jewish children are hidden by the French Resistance in the Chambord Castle to escape the Holocaust.

== Cast ==
- Camille Cottin as Rose
- Maé Roudet Rubens as Hannah
- Léo Riehl as Jacques
- Ferdinand Redouloux as Josef
- Lila-Rose Gilberti as Clara
- Asia Suissa-Fuller as Henriette
- Luka Haggège as Léon
- Félix Nicolas as Paul
- Swann Arlaud as the curator
- Anne-Lise Heimburger as German officer
- Patrick d'Assumçao as the priest
- Franck Beckmann as the gamekeeper

== Production ==
=== Development ===
The film is based on the real-life story of director Mona Achache's paternal grandmother, Suzanne Achache–Wiznitzer, who was a Jewish child placed in foster care during World War II to escape the Holocaust.

The original title, Cœurs vaillants, refers to the French Catholic magazine for children that the hidden children discover in the film.

The character Rose, portrayed by Camille Cottin, was inspired by Rose Valand, a conservator at Paris's Jeu de Paume Museum and a member of the French Resistance who spied and documented artworks stolen by Nazi officers.

The film is a co-production between France's Les Films du Cap and Orson Films, and Belgium's Scope Pictures It was pre-purchased by the French pay-per-view television channels Canal+ and Ciné+ in 2020. BAC Films purchased the film for theatrical release in France. International sales were handled by Other Angle Pictures.

=== Filming ===
Filming was postponed by a few weeks due to the COVID-19 pandemic. Principal photography began on 29 July 2020 and wrapped on 15 September 2020. Filming took place in the commune of Chambord, Loir-et-Cher in the Centre-Val de Loire region of France, and at the Chambord Castle. The shooting followed a strict COVID-19 safety protocol monitored by a COVID reference nurse, and everyone except the actors were using masks on set. The regulations required the children 26 days of filming for them to complete their back-to-school week, so the crew took a week's break.

After shooting at the Chambord Castle for 9 days, the cast and crew then moved to a forest near the Butte de Vienne where filming took place for 18 days. The film's production built a cabin in the forest that should be preserved by Chambord.

== Soundtrack ==
On 2 May 2022, Cocotte & Les Films du Cap released the album with the film's official soundtrack composed by Benoit Rault for HiTnRuN.

Cœurs Vaillants un film de Mona Achache (Bande originale du film)

Soundtrack album by Benoit Rault for HiTnRuN
- Released: 2 May 2022
- Genre: Film soundtrack
- Length: 26:08
- Labels: Cocotte & Les Films du Cap

=== Track listing ===
All tracks are written by Benoit Rault.

Cœurs Vaillants un film de Mona Achache (Bande originale du film)
No.	Title	Length
1.	"Les passagers"	03:44
2.	"La traversée"	03:30
3.	"A Suzanne"	02:18
4.	"Grande"	00:40
5.	"La fuite de Clara"	03:01
6.	"Immensité"	03:12
7.	"Héros toujours"	02:52
8.	"La cabane"	02:01
9.	"Illuminé"	02:24
10.	"Un totem à Juneau"	01:42
11.	"Les passagers 2"	02:44
Total length:		26:08

== Release ==
The film made its world premiere at the War On Screen Film Festival in Mourmelon-le-Grand, France on 1 October 2021. It was released theatrically in France by BAC Films on 11 May 2022.

== Reception ==
=== Critical response ===
AlloCiné, a French cinema site, gave the film an average rating of 2.7/5, based on a survey of 9 French reviews.
