= Christian Gailly =

French writer

- Born: 14 January 1943; Paris
- Died: 4 October 2013 (aged 70); Paris
- Occupation: Writer

Christian Gailly (French pronunciation: [kʁistjɑ̃ ɡaji]; 14 January 1943 – 4 October 2013) was a French writer.

== Biography ==
Born in Paris, Gailly first tried to make a career as a jazz saxophonist, then opened a psychoanalyst practice. He began to be published in the 1980s thanks to Jérôme Lindon.

His novel L'Incident was adapted to cinema by Alain Resnais under the title Les Herbes folles in 2009. Un soir au club, winner of the prix du Livre Inter in 2002, which sold 170,000 copies, was adapted by Jean Achache. Nuage rouge, published in 2000, was awarded the prix France Culture. His latest work is a collection of short stories, La roue, et autres nouvelles, published in January 2012.

== Themes ==
Close to the minimalist mouvement, he was a member of the groupe of the éditions de Minuit to which belonged also among others Jean Echenoz, Jean-Philippe Toussaint and Christian Oster. Rhythmic style and absurd imbroglios are the trademark of his novels. His novels deal mainly with impossible loves, loneliness, sickness and death, but also with other daily tragedies that he tackles in a light tone, sometimes close to gaiety. His writings nevertheless maintain a connection with his love of music, especially jazz, in novels such as Be-Bop and Un soir au club. The influence of American culture, especially cinema, is very present in Les Évadés or Lily et Braine.

His writings often highlight very concrete details which gradually take on great importance, since, according to the author, his stories are sprinkled with "clues, elements, objects, details".

== Works ==
All the works of Christian Gailly are published at éditions de Minuit.

- 1987: Dit-il. Paris: Éditions de Minuit. 1987. p. 192. ISBN 978-2-7073-1146-7.
- 1989: K. 622. Paris: Éditions de Minuit. p. 128. ISBN 978-2-7073-1299-0.
- 1991: L'Air. Paris: Éditions de Minuit. 1991. p. 160. ISBN 978-2-7073-1373-7.
- 1992: Dring. Paris: Éditions de Minuit. 1991. p. 160. ISBN 978-2-7073-1411-6.
- 1993: Les Fleurs. Paris: Éditions de Minuit. 1993. p. 96. ISBN 978-2-7073-1468-0.
- 1995: Be-Bop. Paris: Éditions de Minuit. 1995. p. 192. ISBN 978-2-7073-1514-4.
- 1996: L'Incident. Paris: Éditions de Minuit. 1996. p. 256. ISBN 978-2-7073-1567-0.
- 1997: Les Évadés. Paris: Éditions de Minuit. 1997. p. 256. ISBN 978-2-7073-1600-4.
- 1998: La Passion de Martin Fissel-Brandt. Paris: Éditions de Minuit. 1998. p. 144. ISBN 978-2-7073-1645-5.
- 2000: Nuage rouge. Paris: Éditions de Minuit. 2000. p. 192. ISBN 978-2-7073-1696-7., Prix France Culture, 2000
- 2001: Un soir au club. Paris: Éditions de Minuit. 2002. p. 176. ISBN 978-2-7073-1773-5., Prix du Livre Inter, 2002
- 2004: Dernier amour. Paris: Éditions de Minuit. 2004. p. 128. ISBN 978-2-7073-1885-5.
- 2007: Les Oubliés. Paris: Éditions de Minuit. 2007. p. 144. ISBN 978-2-7073-1977-7.
- 2010: Lily et Braine. Paris: Éditions de Minuit. 2010. p. 192. ISBN 978-2-7073-2090-2.
- 2012: La Roue et autres nouvelles. Paris: Éditions de Minuit. 2012. p. 128. ISBN 978-2-70732-1923.

== About the author ==
- Elisa Bricco; Christine Jérusalem, eds. (2007). Christian Gailly, l'écriture qui sauve. Lire au présent. Saint-Étienne: PU Saint-Etienne. p. 184. ISBN 978-2-86272-468-3.
- Elin Beate Tobiassen (2009). La relation écriture-lecture : Cheminements contemporains. Critiques Littéraires. Paris: L'Harmattan. p. 179. ISBN 978-2-296-10714-4.
- Décapage, n° 49. Paris: Flammarion. 2014. p. 157. ISBN 978-2-081-33090-0.
- Jia Zhao (2012). Ironie dans le roman français depuis 1980 : Echenoz, Chevillard, Toussaint Gailly. Critiques Littéraires. Paris: L'Harmattan. p. 306. ISBN 978-2-336-00838-7.

The following book gives voice to four translators of Gailly's works:

- Vingt-troisièmes assises de la traduction littéraire (Arles 2006) : Paroles en musique. Essais Littéraires. Arles: Actes Sud. 2007. p. 244. ISBN 978-2-7427-7201-8. Collectif, avec Christian Doumet, Patrick Quillier, Jean-Yves Masson, Robert Davreu, Heinz Schwarzinger, Mike Sens, Claire Jatosti.
