= Thierry Hancisse =

Belgian actor (born 1962)

Thierry Hancisse (born 20 November 1962, in Liège) is a Belgian actor. His acting credits include Un soir au club, The Boat Race, Le Couperet, Gabrielle, The Colonel, The Night Watchman, The Lady in the Car with Glasses and a Gun and Fool Moon. He was nominated for the 2010 Magritte Award for Best Actor for The Boat Race.
