= Marilyne Canto =

French actress and film director

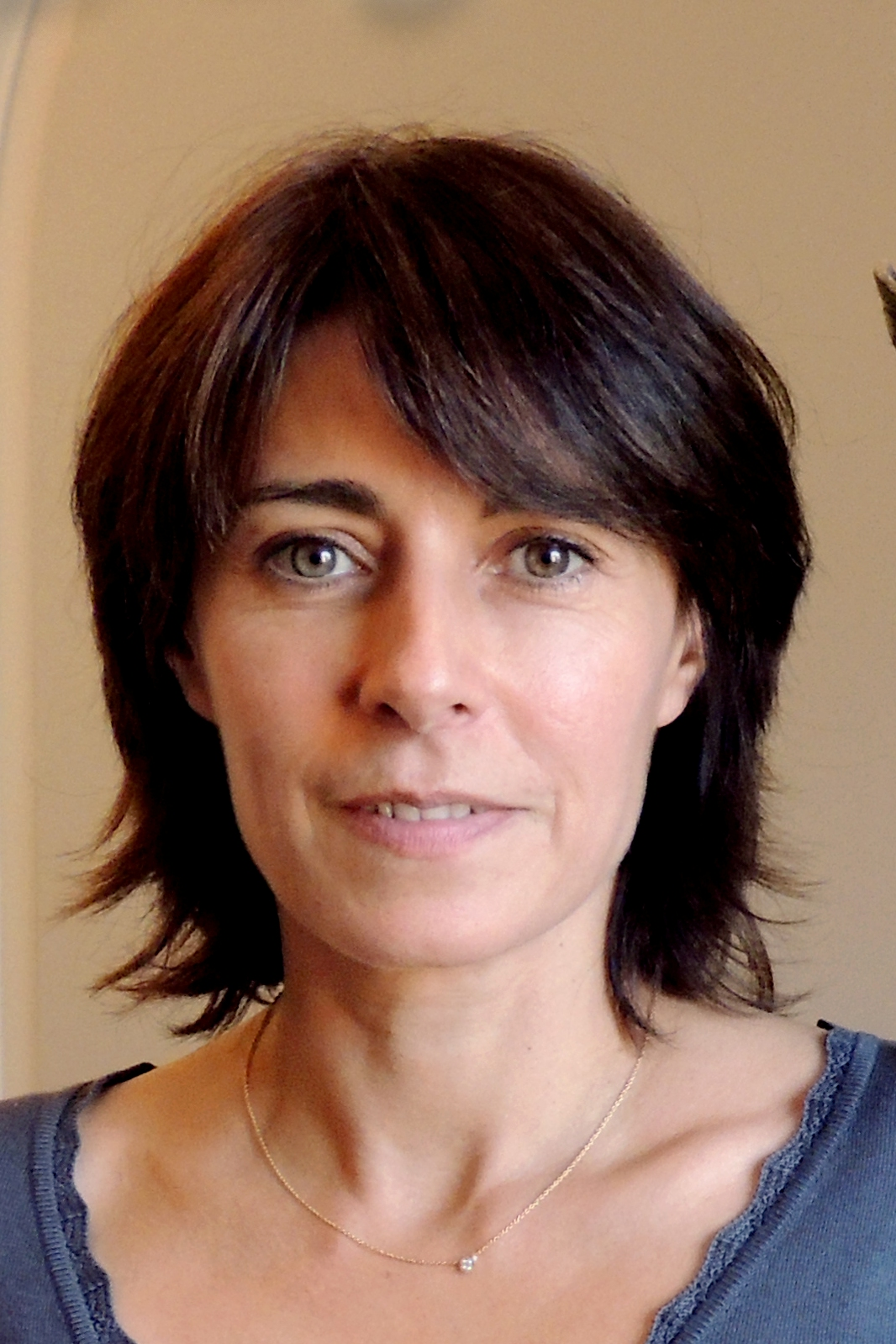
- Born: 18 November 1963 (age 62); Paris, France
- Occupation: Actress
- Years active: 1978-present

Marilyne Canto (born 18 November 1963) is a French actress and film director. She won the 2007 César Award for Best Short Film for Fais de beaux rêves.

== Selected filmography ==
Year	Title	Role	Notes
1978	Holiday Hotel		
1996	When the Cat's Away		
1999	Nadia and the Hippos		
2001	The Milk of Human Kindness		
2003	After You...		
2004	Folle embellie		
2006	Comedy of Power		
2007	Vous êtes de la police?		
2007	La Vie d'artiste	Alice's sister	
2008	Like a Star Shining in the Night		
2009	Un soir au club		
2011	Iris in Bloom		
2011	The Snows of Kilimanjaro		
2014	The Price of Fame		
2016	Fool Moon		
2022	Neneh Superstar	Emmanuelle Braque	
