= Vous êtes de la police? =

Vous êtes de la police ?
- Film poster
- Directed by: Romuald Beugnon
- Written by: Romuald Beugnon; Benjamin Leroux
- Produced by: Emmanuel Agneray; Jérôme Bleitrach; Olivier Bronckart; Dardenne brothers
- Starring: Jean-Pierre Cassel; Philippe Nahon; Jean-Claude Brialy; Micheline Presle; Yolande Moreau; Firmine Richard
- Cinematography: Laurent Brunet
- Edited by: Erika Haglund
- Music by: Sébastien Gaxie
- Production company: Bizibi
- Distributed by: Memento Films
- Release date: 19 December 2007
- Running time: 94 minutes
- Country: France
- Language: French

Vous êtes de la police ? is a 2007 French crime comedy film directed by Romuald Beugnon.

== Plot ==
Simon, a retired police inspector, does not appreciate being placed in a retirement home. Fortunately, he quickly becomes friends with Alfred, another resident. When Alfred dies under strange circumstances, the management, supported by the gendarmerie, declare it an accident. Simon, meanwhile, is convinced that this is a crime and he is determined to solve the mystery. With another resident, Francky, rocker and kleptomaniac rogue, he goes for an unusual police investigation.

== Cast ==
- Jean-Pierre Cassel as Simon Sablonnet
- Philippe Nahon as Francky Garcia
- Jean-Claude Brialy as Alfred Lamproie
- Micheline Presle as Jane Latour-Jackson
- Yolande Moreau as Christine Léger
- Firmine Richard as Chantal Dumas
- Marilyne Canto as Monique Laval
- Pol Deranne as Jacques Poutrard
- Sylvianne Ramboux-Ysaye as Edwige Renard
- Thérèse Roussel as Sidonie Bervelbeck
- Catherine Belkacem as Aglaé François
- Marie-Rose Roland as Marielle Sablonnet
- Sophie Dewulf as Maeva Leloup
- Albert Blanchard as Jean-Jacques Loubin
- Anne Dethier as Sylvie Gonzales
- Mylène Gilsons as Madeleine Bouteloup
