= Un soir au club (novel) =

2001 novel by Christian Gailly

- Author: Christian Gailly
- Genre: Novel
- Publisher: éditions de Minuit
- Publication date: 7 January 2001
- Publication place: France
- Pages: 173
- Awards: Prix du Livre Inter
- ISBN: 2-7073-1773-X

Un soir au club is a novel by Christian Gailly published on 7 January 2001 by éditions de Minuit which won the Prix du Livre Inter prize the next year. The novel was adapted for the screen and became the 2009 film Un soir au club directed by Jean Achache.

== Éditions ==
- Un soir au club, éditions de Minuit, 2001 ISBN 2-7073-1773-X
