= Muriel Barbery =

French novelist and philosophy teacher

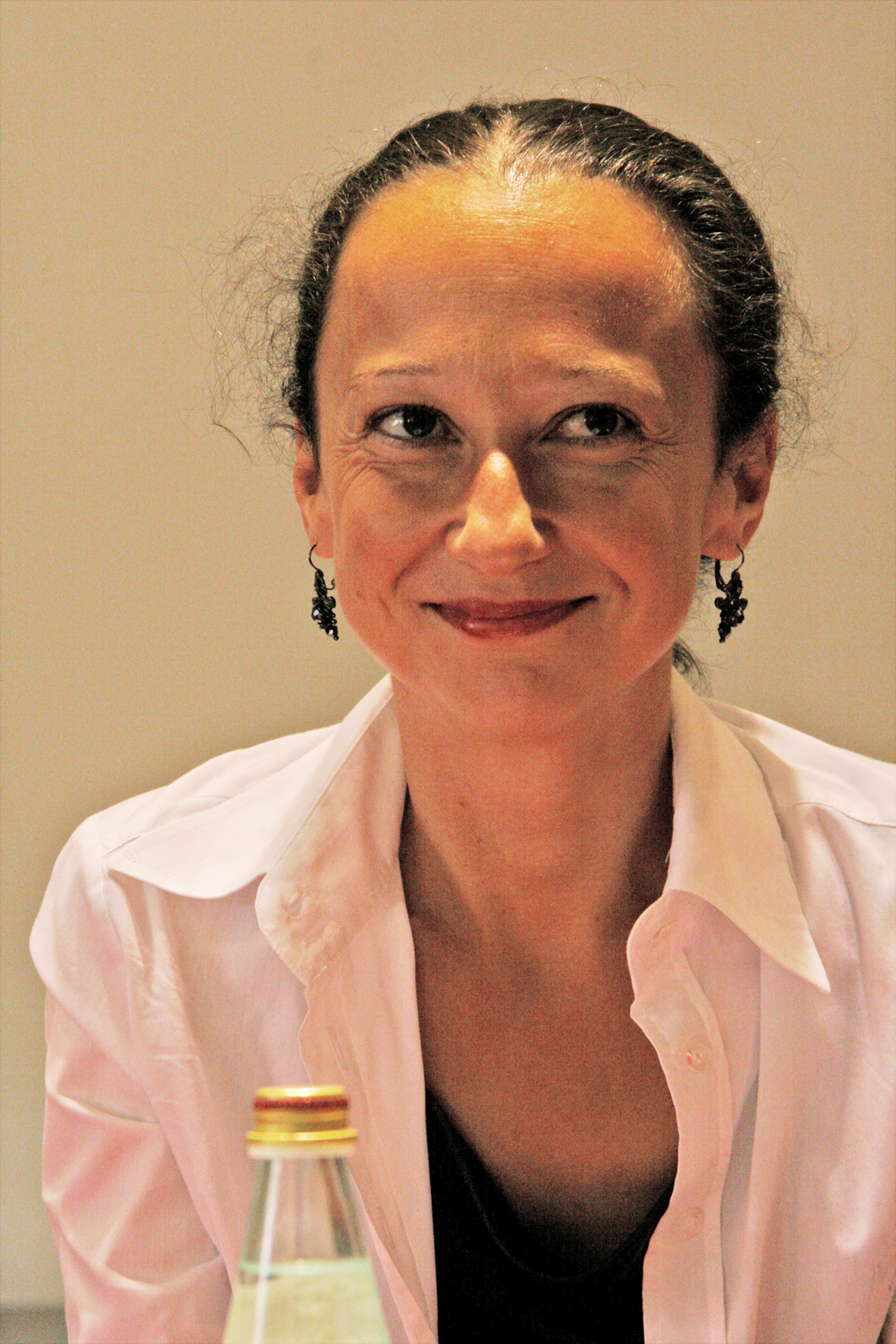
Barbery in 2009

Muriel Barbery (born 28 May 1969) is a French novelist and philosophy teacher. Her 2006 novel The Elegance of the Hedgehog quickly sold more than a million copies in several countries.

== Biography ==
Barbery was born in Casablanca, Morocco, but she and her parents moved when she was two months old. She studied at the Lycée Lakanal, entered the École Normale Supérieure de Fontenay-Saint-Cloud in 1990 and obtained her agrégation in philosophy in 1993. She then taught philosophy at the Université de Bourgogne, in a lycée, and at the Saint-Lô IUFM (teacher training college). After she quit her job, she lived in 2008–2009 in Japan. She currently lives in Europe.

Her novel L'Élégance du hérisson (translated by Alison Anderson as The Elegance of the Hedgehog) topped the French bestseller lists for 30 consecutive weeks and was reprinted 50 times, selling over a million copies by May 2008. It has also been a bestseller in Italy, Germany, Spain, South Korea, and in many other countries. The story concerns the inhabitants of a small upper-class Paris apartment block, notably its crypto-intellectual concierge, Renée. She and Paloma, the likewise intellectual (even radical) teenage daughter of a resident family, narrate the book in turn. Renée also features briefly in Barbery's first novel, Une Gourmandise, which appeared in Anderson's English translation as Gourmet Rhapsody in 2009.

The Elegance of the Hedgehog was turned into a 2009 film called Le Hérisson (in English The Hedgehog), directed by Mona Achache.

In 2025, One Hour of Fervor was longlisted for the International Dublin Literary Award.

== Novels ==
- Une gourmandise, Gallimard, 2000; in English, Gourmet Rhapsody, Europa Editions, August 2009.
- L'élégance du hérisson, Gallimard, 2006; in English The Elegance of the Hedgehog, Europa Editions, September 2008.
- La vie des elfes, Gallimard, March 2015; in English (translated by Alison Anderson) The Life of Elves, Europa Editions, February 2016.
- Un étrange pays, Gallimard, January 2019.
- Une rose seule, Éditions Actes Sud, August 2020.
- Une heure de ferveur, January 2022; in English (translated by Alison Anderson) One Hour of Fervour, 2024.
