= The Snows of Kilimanjaro (short story) =

Short story by Ernest Hemingway

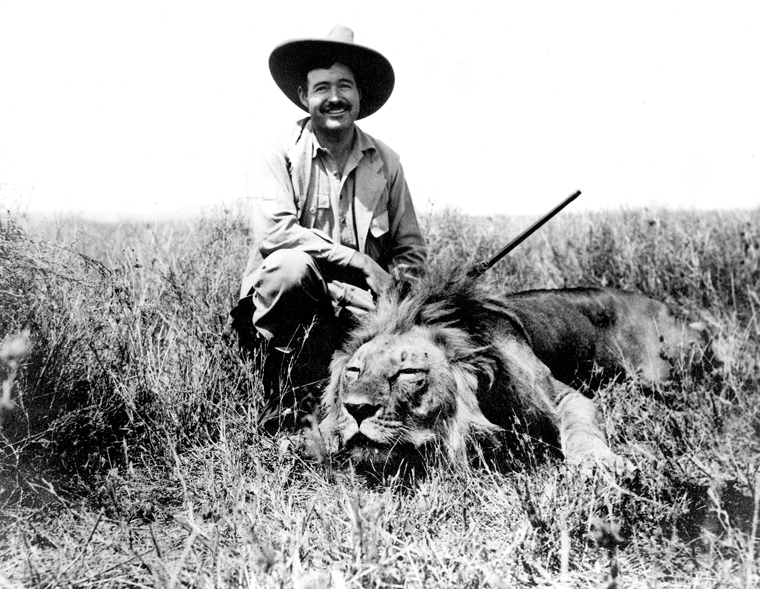
Hemingway hunting on safari, 1934

"The Snows of Kilimanjaro" is a short story by American author Ernest Hemingway first published in August 1936, in Esquire magazine. It was republished in The Fifth Column and the First Forty-Nine Stories in 1938, The Snows of Kilimanjaro and Other Stories in 1961, and is included in The Complete Short Stories of Ernest Hemingway: The Finca Vigía Edition (1987).

== Plot ==
The story opens with a paragraph about Mount Kilimanjaro, the highest mountain in Africa, whose Western summit is called in Masai the "House of God." There, we are told, lies the frozen carcass of a leopard near the summit. No one knows why it is there at such an altitude.

The reader is introduced to Harry, a writer dying of gangrene, and Helen, who is with him on safari in Africa. They are stranded in the camp, because a bearing in their truck's engine burnt out. Harry's situation makes him irritable, and he speaks about his impending death in a matter-of-fact, sarcastic way that upsets Helen. He quarrels with her over minute things, from whether he should drink a whiskey and soda, to whether she should read to him. Helen is obviously concerned for his welfare, but Harry's frustration makes him treat her poorly.

Harry then begins to ruminate on his life experiences, which have been many and varied, and on the fact that he feels he has never reached his potential as a writer because he has chosen to make his living by marrying wealthy women. In italicized portions of the text that are scattered throughout the story, Hemingway narrates some of Harry's experiences in a stream-of-consciousness style. Harry's first memories consist of traveling around Europe following a battle: hiding a deserter in a cottage, hunting and skiing in the mountains, playing cards during a blizzard, and hearing about a bombing run on a train full of Austrian officers.

Harry then falls asleep and wakes in the evening to find Helen returning from a shooting expedition. He meditates on how she really is thoughtful and good to him, and how she is not to blame that his talent as a writer has been destroyed. Helen, he remembers, is a rich widow who lost her husband and a child, was bored by a series of lovers, and eventually "acquired" Harry because "she wanted some one that she respected with her"; she loves Harry "dearly as a writer, as a man, as a companion and as a proud possession", while Harry makes it clear that he does not love her. Harry then recalls how he developed gangrene two weeks earlier: they had been trying to get a picture of some waterbuck, and Harry scratched his right knee on a thorn. He had not applied iodine right away, and the wound got infected; because all other antiseptics ran out, he used a weak carbolic solution that "paralyzed the minute blood vessels", thus the leg developed gangrene.

As Helen returns to drink cocktails with Harry, they make up over their quarrel. Harry's second memory sequence then begins. He recalls how he once patronized prostitutes in Constantinople "to kill his loneliness", pining for the very first woman he fell in love with, with whom he quarreled in Paris and broke up. Harry had a fight with a British soldier over an Armenian prostitute, and then left Constantinople for Anatolia, where, after running from a group of Turkish soldiers, "he had seen the things that he could never think of and later still he had seen much worse". Then Harry recalls that upon his return to Paris, his then-wife inquired about a letter that was actually from Harry's first love—a reply to the letter he wrote to that woman (mailed to New York, asking to write to his office in Paris) while being in Constantinople.

Helen and Harry eat dinner, and then Harry has another memory—this time of how his grandfather's log house burned down. He then relates how he fished in the Black Forest, and how he lived in a poor quarter of Paris and felt a kinship with his poor neighbors. Next, he remembers a ranch and a boy he turned in to the sheriff after the boy protected Harry's horse feed by shooting and killing a thief. Harry ponders, "That was one story he had saved to write. He knew at least twenty good stories from out there and he had never written one. Why?". Then he felt once again that he'd prefer to be in different company rather than with Helen, as the "rich were dull". Next, his thoughts wander to beating the fear of death, and the limits of being able to bear pain. He remembers an officer named Williamson who was hit by a bomb, and to whom Harry subsequently fed all his morphine tablets. Harry considers how he does not have to worry about pain in his current condition.

As Harry lies on his cot remembering, he feels the overwhelming presence of death and associates it with the hyena that has been spotted running around the edge of the campsite. He is unable to speak. Helen, thinking that Harry has fallen asleep, has him moved into the tent for the night. Harry dreams that it is morning, and that a man called Compton has come with a plane to rescue him. He is lifted onto the plane (which has space only for him and the pilot) and watches the landscape go by beneath him. Suddenly, he sees the snow-covered top of Mt. Kilimanjaro, and knows that is where he is bound. Helen wakes up in the middle of the night to a strange hyena cry, and finds Harry unresponsive on his cot. It is not specified whether or not Harry is already dead.

== Adaptation ==
A film adaptation of the short story, directed by Henry King, written by Casey Robinson, and starring Gregory Peck as Harry, Susan Hayward as Helen, and Ava Gardner as Cynthia Green (a character invented for the film) appeared in 1952. The film's ending does not mirror the story's ending.
