= Old Man at the Bridge =

Short story by Ernest Hemingway

"Old Man at the Bridge" is a short story by American writer Ernest Hemingway, written in 1938 and first published in Ken magazine (Vol. 1 No. 4., May 19, 1938) with which he was involved. It was then collected in The Fifth Column and the First Forty-Nine Stories (1938). Set in Spain, it is inspired by Hemingway's experience as a war correspondent during the Spanish Civil War. The story was originally written as a news dispatch by Hemingway from the Amposta Bridge over the Ebro River on Easter Sunday as the Fascists were set to overrun the region. Hemingway's notes on the incident have been reproduced.

== Plot summary ==
On Easter Sunday the narrator, a Republican soldier, crosses a pontoon bridge on the Ebro Delta during the Spanish Civil War to explore the land beyond to determine the Fascist enemy's movements. On returning to the bridge the narrator meets an old man, the last person to leave the town ahead. The seventy-six year old man says that he was forced to leave his animals - two goats, a cat, and four pairs of pigeons. The old man keeps returning to the fate of his animals. The narrator warns him to walk to then get on a truck to Tortosa and onwards to Barcelona.

== Analysis ==
The old man is too old to fight and very tired; he is inclined to remain at the bridge to await his fate, as his animals have already done. The old man neither supports nor opposes the Fascists, and he has an attachment for his animals and his town. By the end of the story the pigeons have become doves, representing peace—in contrast to the war around the narrator and the old man. The old man himself represents the good shepherd wanting to look after his animals. The repetition of the old man's focus on the animals emphasizes his inability to separate the past from the present. The story is further intensified by the imminent death of at least one of the two main characters.
