= The Hedgehog =

2009 French film

- Directed by: Mona Achache
- Written by: Mona Achache; Muriel Barbery
- Based on: The Elegance of the Hedgehog by Muriel Barbery
- Produced by: Anne-Dominique Toussaint
- Starring: Josiane Balasko
- Cinematography: Patrick Blossier
- Edited by: Julia Grégory
- Music by: Gabriel Yared
- Distributed by: Pathé
- Release date: 2009
- Running time: 100 minutes
- Country: France
- Language: French
- Budget: $8.8 million
- Box office: $14.7 million

The Hedgehog (Le Hérisson) is a French film directed by Mona Achache, loosely based on the novel The Elegance of the Hedgehog by Muriel Barbery. Made in 2008, the film was released in theatres in 2009.

== Plot ==
Paloma is an 11-year-old girl quietly and unhappily living in a luxurious Paris apartment with her family. She is intelligent and observant and, sensing disappointment and despair in adulthood, decides to end her life on her twelfth birthday, which is 165 days away. Her father's old camera in hand, she records telling moments in the lives of the inadequate humans around her: her antidepressant-dependent mother, her moody sister, and petulant dinner guests. As Paloma prepares to finish her remaining days, Renée Michel, the gruff-looking, reclusive concierge, manages the building where Paloma and her family live. She hides her passion for literature from her bourgeois employers, but is found out by the new resident Kakuro Ozu, widowed Japanese, as a beautiful bibliophile in elegant disguise. A friendship forms between the two, and they open up about their shared interests and deceased spouses. They also bond with Paloma, who spends time in Renée's apartment when she wants to be away from her family.

In preparation for her suicide, Paloma begins stealing antidepressants from her mother. One night, she seemingly kills her sister's goldfish by feeding it one of the pills before flushing it down the toilet. Renée later finds the still-living goldfish in her own toilet and saves it. Growing to admire Renée, Paloma tells her parents she wants to be a concierge when she grows up.

One day while Paloma is visiting Renée, Kakuro stops by to ask Renée on a date. Her low self-esteem causes her reject him, but she later changes her mind and accepts the invitation. The couple go to a restaurant and enjoy a lovely evening together, with Renée optimistic about their future together. The next day--Paloma's twelfth birthday--Renée walks into the street to chastise her neighbor for dancing in traffic and is suddenly struck by a van and killed instantly. Paloma, shaken by the tragedy of a life cut short, cancels her plans for suicide.

Sometime later, Kakuro moves out of the building. Before he leaves, he gives Paloma both volumes of Anna Karenina, which Renée left in her bookshelves. Paloma takes the books into her apartment alongside the goldfish Renée had saved.

== Cast ==
- Josiane Balasko - Renée Michel
- Garance Le Guillermic - Paloma Josse
- Togo Igawa - Monsieur Kakuro Ozu
- Ariane Ascaride - Manuela Lopez
- Anne Brochet - Solange Josse
- Wladimir Yordanoff - Paul Josse
- Sarah Lepicard - Colombe Josse
- Valérie Karsenti - Tibère's mother

== Critical reception ==
The film received positive reviews. Review aggregator Rotten Tomatoes reports that 88% of 67 critics gave the film a positive review, for an average rating of 7/10.
