= Pascal Danel =

French singer (1944–2024)

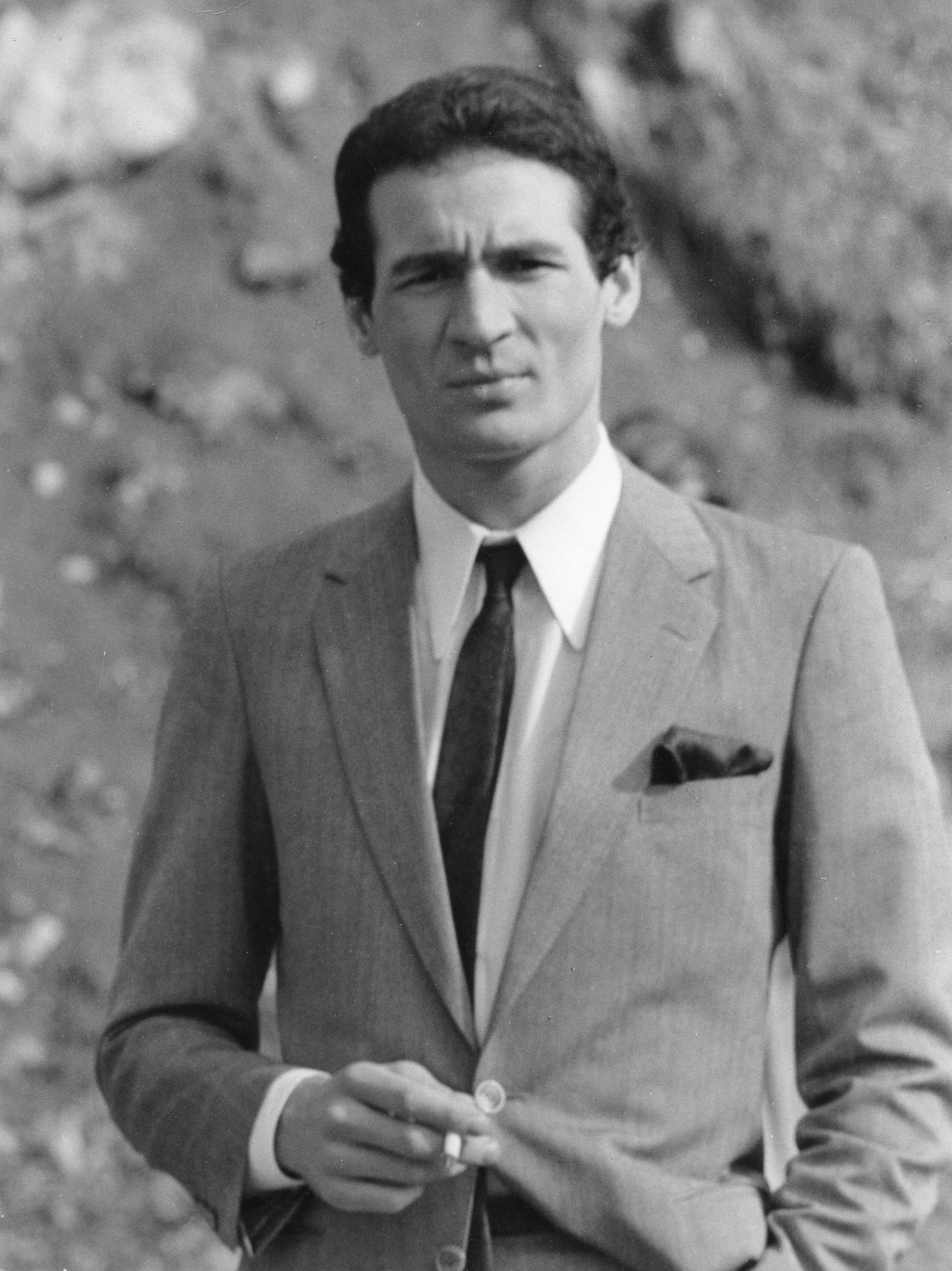
- Danel in 1967

Background information
- Born: Jean-Jacques Pascal; 31 March 1944; Paris, German-occupied France
- Died: 25 July 2024 (aged 80)
- Genres: Pop
- Occupations: Singer, composer
- Years active: 1964–2024

Pascal Danel (born Jean-Jacques Pascal; 31 March 1944 – 25 July 2024) was a French pop singer and composer best known for the hit singles “La Plage aux romantiques” (1966) and “Kilimandjaro” (1967).

== Early life ==
Jean-Jacques Pascal was born on 31 March 1944. As a teenager he left school to join a travelling circus as a tightrope walker. After a serious fall ended his high-wire career, he turned to songwriting during his recuperation and adopted the stage name Pascal Danel.

== Career ==
Danel began recording as a singer in 1962. Following two minor hits, he achieved his breakthrough with “La Plage aux romantiques,” a No. 1 single in France and several other European countries that earned a gold disc in 1966. The following year, “Kilimandjaro” became an international success—reaching No. 1, certified platinum, and recorded by Danel in six languages. The song went on to be recorded more than 180 times by artists worldwide and is regarded as one of the major French standards of the decade.

Danel frequently recorded his material not only in French but also in Italian, Spanish and Japanese, and he toured internationally. In 1972, he placed third at the Rose d’Or d’Antibes song festival with “Ton âme.”

== Later work ==
Through the late 1960s and 1970s he released a string of hits, including another No. 1, “Comme une enfant,” alongside several Top-10 singles, while some releases charted more modestly. In 1979 “La Plage aux romantiques” returned to the French Top 5; Danel undertook a new tour and issued a live album as well as additional studio tracks. He later moved into television production in the mid-1980s and returned to the charts in 1989 with a compilation produced by his son, guitarist and producer Jean-Pierre Danel, which earned another gold disc. His final album of new material appeared in 2000.

Between 2007 and 2009, Danel joined a major nostalgia tour alongside several 1960s icons, performing sold-out shows in large French venues; the tour reportedly sold 1,750,000 tickets.

== Death ==
Pascal Danel died on 25 July 2024, at the age of 80.

== Selected songs ==
- “La Plage aux romantiques” (1966)
- “Kilimandjaro” (1967)
- “Comme une enfant”
- “Ton âme” (1972)

== Legacy ==
Danel’s repertoire—particularly “Kilimandjaro” and “La Plage aux romantiques”—has remained a touchstone of French popular music of the 1960s, noted for its wide international reach through multilingual recordings and numerous cover versions.

== Hit singles ==
- Je m'en fous (1965) (N°18)
- Hop là tu as vu! (1965) (N°16)
- La plage aux romantiques (1966) (N°1)
- Pierrot le sait (1966) (N°33)
- Kilimandjaro (1966) (N°1)
- Jeanne (1967) (N°16)
- Les trois dernières minutes (1967) (N°6)
- Comme une enfant (1967) (N°1)
- Mon ami (1967) (N°13)
- Avec un bout de crayon (1967) (N°38)
- Le Funambule (1968) (N°21)
- La Neige est en deuil (1968) (N°14)
- L'Italie (1968) (N°32)
- Bonjour Madame la Tendresse (1968) (N°20)
- Allez viens on danse (1968) (N°24)
- Dans la main d'une fille (1969) (N°42)
- Un jour d'été (1969) (N°27)
- Mamina (1970) (N°4)
- Ton âme (1972) Prix de la Rose d'Or (N°17)
- Notre Dame (1972) (N°48)
- Je suis un aventurier (1973) (N°2)
- Pour un amour (1973) (N°11)
- Le Petit Prince n'est pas mort (1973) (N°7)
- Comme on est bien ensemble (1973) (N°21)
- Rotterdam (1974) (N°13)
- La Communale de mes 10 ans (1978) (N°26)
- Si l'on vivait ensemble (1978) (N°41)
- Et j'ai soudain beaucoup d'amis (1979) (N°50)
- La plage aux romantiques (1979) (N°5)
- Les grands oiseaux (1980) (N°44)
- Un homme fou d'amour (1981) (N°41)
- Et si on partait d'ici (1982) (N°19)
- La robe d'Organdi (1983) (N°48)
- While My Guitar Gently Weeps (duet with Jean-Pierre Danel) (2009) (N°29)

== Other singles ==
- "Soldat soldat" (1964)
- "Paul" (1973)
- "J'écris ton nom" (1973)
- "Ne bouge pas ne parle pas" (1975)
- "Je m'appelle comme tu veux" (1976)
- "Je suis un homme tout simplement" (1976)
- "Le mal de mer" (1977)
- "Le coin du bois d'amour" (1981)
- "Les rats" (1983)

== Albums ==
- Kilimandjaro – 1967
- Collection Record – 1968
- Disque d'or – 1970
- Impact – 1973
- Rotterdam – 1974
- Si tu passes le pont – 1975
- Ailleurs – 1978
- Générique 80 – 1979
- Succès – 1980
- Olympia 80 – 1980
- Un homme fou d'amour – 1981
- Les plus belles chansons – 1982
- Les Rats – 1983
- Les plus grands succès – 1989
- Buttafoco – 1994
- Je voulais simplement te dire – 2000

=== Compilations ===
- Diamond
- Master Série
- Talents du Siècle
- L'Estérel
- Kilimandjaro
- La plage aux romantiques
- Essential
- Gold
- Mes années vinyl
- Les Inoubliables
- Sus grandes éxitos (Spain)
