= Winner Take Nothing =

Book by Ernest Hemingway

- First Edition
- Author: Ernest Hemingway
- Language: English
- Genre: Short stories
- Publisher: Charles Scribner's Sons
- Publication date: 27 October 1933
- Publication place: United States
- Media type: Print (hardback & paperback)
- OCLC: 256703

Winner Take Nothing is a 1933 collection of short stories by Ernest Hemingway. Hemingway's third and final collection of stories, it was published four years after A Farewell to Arms (1929), and a year after his non-fiction book about bullfighting, Death in the Afternoon (1932).

== Content ==
Winner Take Nothing was published on 27 October 1933 by Scribner's with a first edition print-run of approximately 20,000 copies. The volume included the following stories:

=== "After the Storm" ===
The story is based on an account told to Ernest Hemingway in 1928 about the sinking off the Florida Keys, in the late summer of 1919, of the Spanish steamer, the SS Valbanera.

"After the Storm" involves a treasure hunter who takes his ship out from the Florida Keys following a major storm, searching for boats which had been wrecked in the storm, in order to loot any valuables. The man eventually finds an untouched cruise ship filled with valuables, as well as corpses, but he is unable to gain entry to the ship or collect anything of value. The treasure hunter returns to the site later, but by that time the cruise ship had already been looted by others.

=== "The Light of the World" ===
"The Light of the World" is one of Hemingway's Nick Adams stories. It deals with Nick Adams who, along with a friend, enter a train station in Michigan. At the station are various figures who converse with the narrator and his friend, including five prostitutes. The story includes references to Stanley Ketchel, a Michigan-born boxer who had been murdered.

=== "God Rest You Merry, Gentlemen" ===
"God Rest You Merry, Gentlemen" takes place during Christmastime, taking its name from the famous Christmas carol. The story centers around a hospital and its staff. A local boy comes to the hospital and indicates that he had been having feelings of lust, which the boy believed was a sin; the boy asks the doctors at the hospital to castrate him. The doctors refuse, indicating that there was nothing wrong with him. On Christmas Day, the boy is brought to the hospital after having attempted to castrate himself, though it is revealed the boy did not understand what castration was.

=== "The Sea Change" ===
"The Sea Change" deals with a married couple having an argument in a bar. While never explicitly stated, it is clear that the wife had an affair with another woman, and that the husband is wrestling with the idea of divorcing her.

=== "The Mother of a Queen" ===
"The Mother of a Queen" is a story about a bullfighter who is referred to as a "queen," and the narrator, who is both the bullfighter's friend and his manager. The bullfighter is a miser to the point he stops paying upkeep on his mother's grave, leading to her bones being thrown in the local communal grave. The narrator ending his friendship with the bullfighter because the bullfighter refuses to pay a debt to the narrator.

=== "One Reader Writes" ===
"One Reader Writes" is written in the form of a letter to an advice column. The reader writes that her husband had contracted syphilis while stationed in Shanghai, and she asks the columnist whether the "malady" could be cured.

=== "Homage to Switzerland" ===
"Homage to Switzerland" is a story in three parts; each of the three parts describes the course of an evening hour at a different Swiss train station. All three parts start in the same way: A man sits in a train station café, where a waitress tells him that his train is running an hour late; the man flirts with the waitress but she is unreceptive; then each part goes in its own direction.

In the first part, in Montreaux, Mr. Wheeler's proposition of the waitress is merely a ruse. In the second part, in Vevey, Mr. Johnson buys expensive champagne to drink with some train station attendants, and he jests with them about his impending divorce. And in the third part, in Territet, an overly serious member of the National Geographic Society is oblivious to the condescending irony of Mr. Harris.

=== "Wine of Wyoming" ===
"Wine of Wyoming" takes place in Wyoming during the Prohibition Era. The story follows the narrator, who is visiting Wyoming for the summer and befriends a French immigrant couple who sell bootlegged beer and wine out of their home. The story discusses the couple's attempts to make a living in America with their young son, against a backdrop of American patrons who drink to excess and trouble with the law from bootlegging. The story makes use of a mixture of French and English dialogue, often switching back and forth within the same conversation.

== 1977 Reissue ==
Reissued in 1977, the collection included three additional stories:

- "The Short Happy Life of Francis Macomber"
- "The Capital of the World"
- "Old Man at the Bridge"
