= The Capital of the World (short story) =

Short story by Ernest Hemingway

- Short story by Ernest Hemingway
- Country: United States
- Language: English

Publication
- Publication date: June 1936 (in Esquire); 14 October 1938 (as part of The Fifth Column and the First Forty-Nine Stories)

"The Capital of the World" is a short story by American writer Ernest Hemingway. The story takes place in Madrid and follows Paco, a young waiter apprentice, and his desire to become a matador.

== Summary ==
The story opens in a hotel called the Pension Luarca in Calle San Jeronimo. The main source of residency in the cheap hotel is a group of second-rate bullfighters, who, for the most part, were all great at some point, but some obstacle or circumstance has ended their careers with no likely hope in sight. Of the bullfighter residents in the hotel there is one banderillero, two picadors, and three matadors. The other main characters in the story are three waiters, all with different things they plan to do the evening the story is set. Also included is the dish washer Enrique, who contributes to the story's tragic end.

The work has a back story for each character telling his or her almost consistently sad tale. Of the three matadors, one has prematurely ended his career because of being badly mauled in the ring, and is now afraid to go back in. The second one has done nothing to himself to hurt his career, but is constantly ill, only making appearances out of his room for meals. Finally, the third matador’s career has ended because his once original routine has grown old and people have lost interest.

The other toreros' stories do not display quite so much detail. One of the picadors drinks himself into a stupor every night, while the other is a large man who rarely gets work with a matador for very long due to his argumentative nature. The banderillero is a middle-aged man who, unlike most of the others at the hotel, still has a sufficient amount of promise. The other characters who come to the attention of the reader later in the evening have stories as well, especially Paco, the waiter apprentice from Extramadura. The three waiters, all with different thoughts on their mind, prepare to serve dinner in the dining room.

The first waiter finds himself anxious to leave early for the anarcho-syndicalist political meeting later that night, so Paco agrees to cover for him so that he may leave early. The second waiter, a middle aged man, has no real plans for the evening other than to serve tables. Finally, there is Paco, a boy who aspires to become a bullfighter like the people he serves at the restaurant.

After the dining hours come to a close and people start leaving, Paco and the middle-aged worker head back to the kitchen and start drinking a bottle of wine with Enrique, the dish washer. After the middle-aged man leaves, Enrique starts talking to Paco about how dangerous bullfighting is, but Paco insists that he wants to be a bullfighter someday. So to prove his point, Enrique gets a chair and puts knives on it, charging at Paco as a bull would. Paco dodges the knives at first, but after he cheats death several times, a knife pierces his leg, severing the femoral artery. He soon dies, his head "full of illusions".

First published in Esquire in June 1936 as "The Horns of the Bull", it was changed to its present title in the short story collection The Fifth Column and the First Forty-Nine Stories, published in 1938.
