= Garance Le Guillermic =

French former child actress (born 1997)

- Born: 11 September 1997 (age 29); Boulogne-Billancourt, France
- Occupation: Actress
- Notable work: The Hedgehog, London Mon Amour, Angie by Olivier Megaton

Garance Le Guillermic (born 11 September 1997) is a French former child actress.

She starred in six movies but is best known for her role as witty 11-year-old Paloma in Mona Achache's 2009 film The Hedgehog along with Josiane Balasko.

== Filmography ==
- 2009: The Hedgehog (Original title "Le Hérisson") by Mona Achache (as Paloma)
- 2008: London Mon Amour (Original title "Mes Amis, Mes Amours") by Lorraine Lévy (as Emilie)
- 2007: Angie by Olivier Megaton (as Angie)
- 2006: I Hate My Best Friends' Kids (Original title "Je Déteste les Enfants des Autres) by Anne Fassio (as Sataya)
- 2006: Have Mercy on Us All (Original title "Pars Vite et Reviens Tard) by Régis Wargnier (as Lucie)

== Television ==
- 2014: Famille d'accueil, by Stéphane Kaminka, episode "La griffe du léopard" (as Amélie)
- 2006: Déja Vu by François Vautier (as Lola Wheen, Nell)
- 2005: Les Soeurs Robin by Jacques Renard (as Aminthe)
