= Kilimandjaro (song) =

Single by Pascal Danel

from the album Kilimandjaro
- Released: 1966
- Recorded: 1966
- Genre: Pop
- Label: Disc'AZ
- Songwriters: Michel Delancray, Pascal Danel

Music video
- "Kilimandjaro" on YouTube

"Kilimandjaro", sometimes known as "Les Neiges du Kilimandjaro" (The Snows of Kilimanjaro) is a famous French-language song by French singer Pascal Danel released in 1966. It was considered one of the definitive French songs of the 1960s, Danel's biggest hit, and one of the most-broadcast French songs on French radio. The lyrics were written by Michel Delancray and the music was composed by Danel himself. The arrangement of the song was by Laurent Voulzy. The song was certified platinum, topping the French charts, and it has been the subject of tens of cover versions in many languages. The song did make an appearance on the Canadian RPM French charts.

The song was successful in many European countries, the Middle East and Asia, most particularly Japan. Pascal Danel released many language versions including Italian, Spanish, German, Japanese, and Corsican.

Later on, he sang it live at the Olympia in 1980 and in the 2007 tour "Âge tendre" and 2008 tour "Têtes de bois" with revised orchestration versions. Other artists have interpreted the song in German, Spanish, Hebrew, and Portuguese, with chart successes in various countries.

In 1989, Pascal Danel proposed a remixed version of "Kilimandjaro" that was produced by his son, and the album containing the remix was certified gold.

== In popular culture ==
"Kilimandjaro" was named as one of the Top 15 best French songs of the decade according to a survey by Télé 7 Jours. In the television broadcast Succès fous, it was named third most popular after a song by Daniel Balavoine and another by Joe Dassin. In the 1990s, the song came back yet again through the show Les Années Twist (meaning the Twist Years). The song was featured on the soundtrack of Robert Guédiguian's 2011 film The Snows of Kilimanjaro titled in French (French: Les Neiges du Kilimandjaro).
