= Un soir au club (film) =

- Directed by: Jean Achache
- Screenplay by: Guy Zilberstein; Jean Achache
- Based on: Un soir au club by Christian Gailly
- Starring: Thierry Hancisse; Élise Caron; Marilyne Canto
- Music by: Michel Benita
- Release date: November 18, 2009
- Running time: 88 minutes
- Country: France
- Language: French

Un soir au club is a 2009 French film directed by Jean Achache based on the novel of the same name Un soir au club by Christian Gailly.

== Plot ==
A former jazz pianist visits a jazz club and is drawn back into the jazz scene.

== Cast ==
- Thierry Hancisse as Simon Nardis
- Élise Caron as Debbie Parker
- Marilyne Canto as Suzanne
- Anne Kessler as Anne
- Jean-Paul Bathany as Moineau
- Geordy Monfils as Nicolas
- Gaetan Nicot as Le pianiste
- Xavier Lugué as Le bassiste
- Marc Delouya as Le batteur
