= CineLibri =

Book and movie festival in Bulgaria

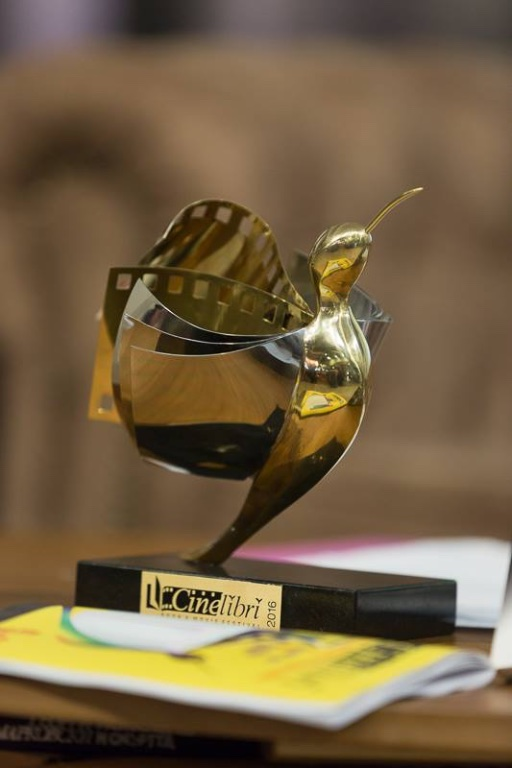
CineLibri statue

CineLibri (Bulgarian: Синелибри) is an annual international book and movie festival in Bulgaria founded in 2015, intended to showcase the best literary adaptations for cinema, both contemporary and classic. Jacqueline Wagenstein founded the event.

== Description ==
Cinelibri is an annual event inspired by the interaction of arts – cinema and literature, in particular. It is held in Sofia, Plovdiv, Varna, Burgas, Gabrovo, Veliko Tarnovo, Stara Zagora and other cities every autumn, and showcases the best examples of films connected to literary works, both contemporary and classic. Cinelibri is an independent platform for European film productions and co-productions. Every year Cinelibri welcomes filmmakers, actors, screenwriters and audiovisual professionals, along with European film professionals and journalists to present films.

The Official Competition includes 10 to 20 films from the last 18 months judged by an international jury composed of a President and Members (including producers, directors, writers, screenwriters, actors, film composers). The Cinelibri statuette for Best Feature Film is presented to the film's director or producer for their skillful interpretation of a literary work into the language of cinema.

The festival also presents awards in the following categories: Best Short Film, Best Documentary and Best Costume Design in Bulgarian Contemporary Cinema. The festival also bestows a Cinelibri Lifetime Achievement Award to creators in the field of cinema, literature, and script adaptation.

Cinelibri shows outstanding films out of competition in The Main Program, which highlights film works such as adaptations, biopics, films created by writing directors, original scripts authored by writers, films inspired by novels, poems, theater plays, graphic novels, and films with a subject somehow related to literature.

All the selected titles are national and international premieres. They are presented in movie theaters and art spaces in Bulgarian cities, alongside the literary works which inspired the filmmakers.

The Parallel Program of Cinelibri includes several film sections: classics and retrospectives; contemporary European productions and co-productions based on books; biopics of renowned authors, poets and playwrights; milestone documentaries and short films; animation; children’s films; young adults movies; engaged cinema; celebration of jubilees and tributes to prominent directors and screenwriters.

Cinelibri includes a number of educational modules such as lectures, panel discussions with visiting experts, masterclasses, workshops, and various free events with the participation of special guests, and professional modules such as industry meetings and pitching sessions.

Sustainable and diversity-respectful events focus on issues related to the environment, gender equality, and social inclusion by collaborating with specialized NGOs. The meetings with established European creators and young professionals, as well as all the accompanying events with speakers and guests aim to promote Europe’s cultural heritage and contemporary European cinema and literature. The festival maintains a yearlong activity with numerous events in cooperation with schools and universities, decentralized screenings, regular distribution of European films, international meetings and interactions.

== History ==
The festival started in 2015, and was held in Sofia, Plovdiv and Varna in its first year. Among the honorary guests were the writer Margaret Mazzantini and the director and actor Sergio Castellitto.

In 2016, five more cities joined the event, and the CineLibri Prize went to French literary critic Frédéric Beigbeder.

In 2017 the festival was held in Sofia and 10 other cities. For the first time, a winner was announced out of a film competition list. The winner was nominated by an independent international jury consisting of Bruno Coulais, Keira Chaplin, Doriana Leondeff and Ilian Djevelekov. Rosso Istanbul directed by Ferzan Özpetek won the award for best film adaptation. The Award for Entire Contribution went to the European director Volker Schlöndorff, who presented in Sofia his latest film, Return to Montauk.

Among the guests of the festival in 2017 was David Grossman, whose novel A Horse Walks into a Bar won the 2017 Man Booker International Prize.

In 2018, the CineLibri award for best adaptation of the year was presented to See You Up There (Au revoir là-haut) directed by Albert Dupontel. The honorary Cinelibri Award for Entire Contribution went to the British novelist and screenwriter Ian McEwan, who presented the film On Chesil Beach directed by Dominic Cooke.

In 2019, the grand prize was presented to Burning (2018)' adapted from the short story Burning Barn by Haruki Murakami. The jury included David Lagercrantz, Radu Mihăileanu, Loredana Cannata and Irini Jambonas.

In 2020, CineLibri Best Literary Adaptation Award was presented to Berlin Alexanderplatz (2020) 2020. Jean-Jacques Annaud was honorable chairman of the jury.

The 2021 festival was held between October 2-31 in Sofia and seven other Bulgarian cities.

The October 2022 festival included a documentary film competition for the first time.

The 2023 festival was held between October 6–29 in Sofia, Plovdiv, Varna, Burgas, Veliko Tarnovo, Gabrovo, and Stara Zagora.

In 2024 CineLibri celebrated its tenth anniversary from 10 October to 3 November. Parthenope was the opening film. Best Book-to-Film Adaptation Award was won by the biographical drama Limonov: The Ballad, by Kirill Serebrennikov, based on Limonov by Emmanuel Carrère.

The 2025 festival was from October 10 to November 3, 2025.

The opening film was The Stranger (2025) directed by François Ozon. The esteemed Jury of CineLibri competition for a full-length feature film based on work of literature this year was presented by: Claes Bang – President, Sergei Loznitsa, Tonia Sotiropoulou, Katya Trichkova and Aton Soumache.
