= Antoine Louis =

French surgeon and physiologist (1723 – 1792)

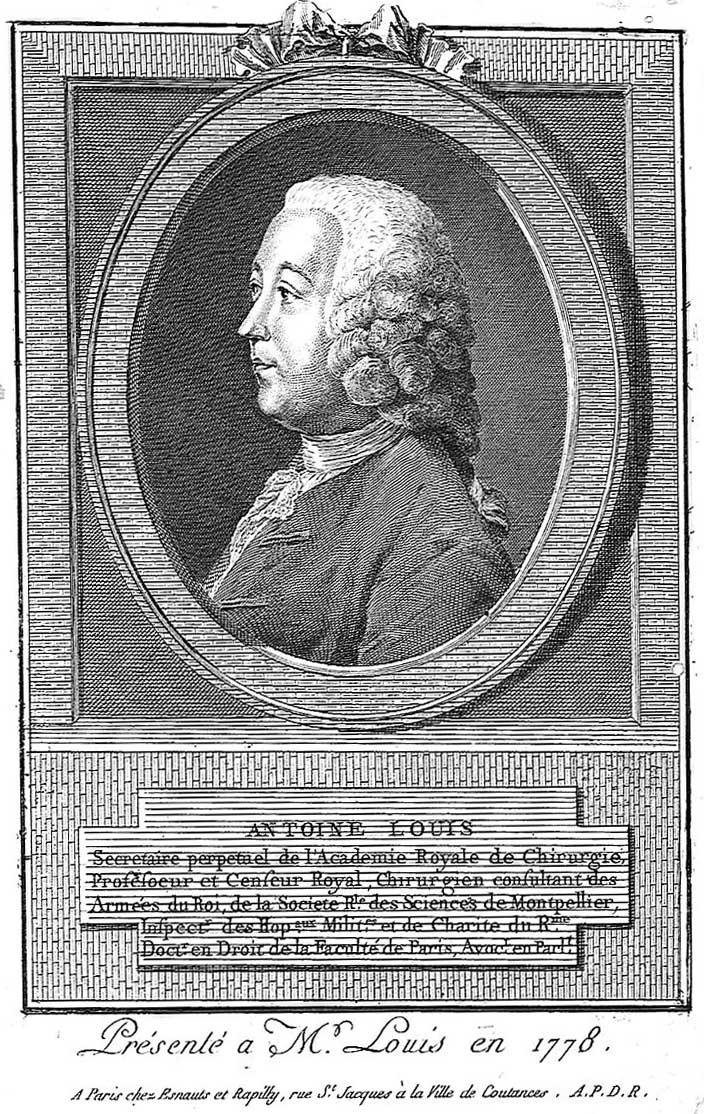
- Professor Antoine Louis in 1778
- Born: 13 February 1723; Metz, France
- Died: 20 May 1792 (aged 69); Paris, France
- Occupations: surgeon and physiologist
- Known for: inventing the guillotine or louisette

Antoine Louis (French: [ɑ̃twan lwi]) (13 February 1723 – 20 May 1792) was a French surgeon and physiologist. He was originally trained in medicine by his father, a sergeant major at a local military hospital. As a young man he moved to Paris, where he served as gagnant-maîtrise at the Salpêtrière. In 1750 he was appointed professor of physiology, a position he held for 40 years. In 1764 he was appointed lifetime secretary to the Académie Royale de Chirurgie.

Louis is credited with designing a prototype of the guillotine. For a period of time after its invention, the guillotine was called a louisette. However, it was later named after French physician Joseph Ignace Guillotin, whose advocacy of a more humane method of capital punishment prompted the guillotine's design.

Louis published numerous articles on surgery, including several biographies of surgeons who died in his lifetime. He also published the surgical aphorisms of Dutch physician Herman Boerhaave. The "angle of Louis" is another name for the sternal angle, which is the point of junction between the manubrium and the body of the sternum.

== Works and publications ==
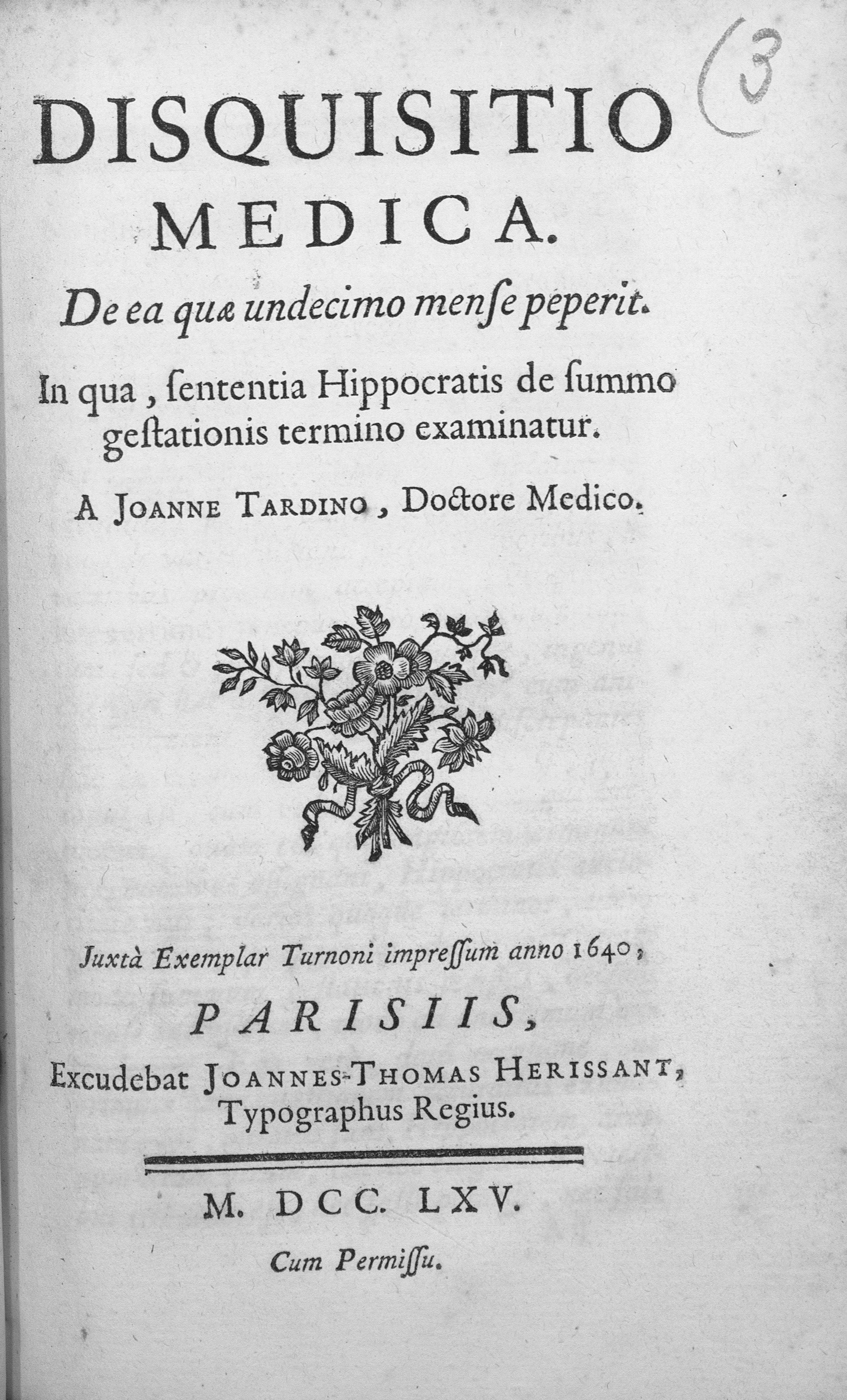
Mémoire contre la légitimité des naissances prétendues tardives, 1764

- Réfutation de l'écrit des médecins, intitulé la subordination des chirurgiens aux médecins, démontrée par la nature des deux professions, & par le bien public, 1748, 32 p. Texte intégral.
- Addition à l'examen des plaintes des médecins de province, présentées au roy par la Faculté de Médecine de Paris, 1749, 11 p. Texte intégral.
- Éloge de M. Petit. Prononcé à la séance publique de l'Académie royale de chirurgie. Le mardi 26 mai 1750, 1750, 2 p.
- Lettres sur la certitude des signes de la mort : où l'on rassure les citoyens de la crainte d'être enterrés vivans : avec des observations [et] des expériences sur les noyés, Michel Lambert (Paris), 1752, 376 p. Texte intégral.
- Lettre sur les maladies vénériennes, dans laquelle on publié la manière de préparer le mercure dont la plus forte dose n'excite point de salivation, Michel Lambert (Paris), 1754, 12 p. Texte intégral.
- Mémoire sur une question anatomique relative à la jurisprudence; dans lequel on établit les principes pour distinguer, à l'inspection d'un corps trouvé pendu, les signes du suicide d'avec ceux de l'assassinat, P. G. Cavelier (Paris), 1763, 54 p. Texte intégral et available at Gallica.
- Parallèle des différentes méthodes de traiter la maladie vénérienne, François Changuion (Amsterdam), 1764, 290 p. Texte intégral.
- Recueil d'observations d'anatomie et de chirurgie, pour servir de base a la théorie des lésions de la tête, par contre-coup, P. G. Cavelier (Paris), 1766, 270 p. Texte intégral.
- Éloge de M. Bertrandi, associé étranger de l'académie royale de chirurgie, chirurgien de Sa Majesté le roi de Sardaigne, professeur d'Anatomie & de chirurgie en l'Université de Turin, P. Guillaume Cavelier (Paris), 1767, 63 p. Texte intégral.
- Dictionnaire de chirurgie, communiqué à l'Encyclopédie, Saillant & Nyon (Paris), 1789, 2 vol. :
1. tome premier Texte intégral.
2. tome second Texte intégral.
- Mémoire sur l'opération du bec-de-lièvre, où l'on établit le premier principe de l'art de réunir les plaie, in-12, 69 p. available at Gallica.
- Éloges lus dans les séances publiques de l'Académie royale de chirurgie de 1750 à 1792, par Antoine Louis, recueillis & publiés par E. Frédéric Dubois (d'Amiens), Paris : Baillière & fils, 1859

== Bibliography ==
- Pierre Sue : « Discours historique sur la vie et les ouvrages du citoyen Louis », [Séance publique de l'Académie de Chirurgie du 11 avril 1793], Croullebois (Paris), 32, 1793, p. 10-73 Texte intégral.
- Georges Sauvé : « Un cours de médecine d'Antoine Petit en 1768 », in : Histoire des Sciences médicales, 1988, 22 (3-4), pp. 237–248 iubbcvb Texte intégral.
- Antoine Jacques Louis Jourdan : « Louis (Antoine) », in: Dictionaire Des Sciences Médicales - Biographie Médicale, Panckoucke(Paris), t.6, 1824, p. 113-120 Texte intégral.
- Metz, documents généalogiques, 1561–1792, Poirier.
- Henri Tribout de Morembert : Documents généalogiques du Pays Messin et de la Lorraine de Langue Allemande, 1630-1830, Saffroy, 1935, 159 p.
- Biographies médicales et scientifiques, [XVIIIe siècle] (Jean Astruc, Antoine Louis, Pierre Desault, Xavier Bichat), éditions Roger Dacosta, 1972.
- Michel Porret : « Calas innocent : les preuves par la science, in : L'Histoire,323, septembre 2007, 69–73.
