= Marilou Aussilloux =

French actress

Aussilloux at the Venice Film Festival 2026.

Marilou Aussilloux is a French actress.

== Life ==
Born in Narbonne in 1994, she studied at a literary "classe préparatoire", then studied at the philosophy faculty, before moving to Paris. There she studied on the Cours Florent to be admitted to the Conservatoire national supérieur d'art dramatique

She began her screen career in 2015 with an appearance in The law of ... and Call My Agent!. Her first film role was the 2019 Raoul Taburin directed by Pierre Godeau then in De Gaulle and Bye Bye Morons (both 2020). On television she has worked with Jean-Xavier de Lestrade on the series Jeux d'influence, in which she played one of the leads. She also played the lead in 2020's La Révolution and played Cécile Grégoire in the series Germinal, written by Julien Lilti and directed by David Hourrègue.

At the same time she continued to act on stage in Jumeaux Vénitiens by Carlo Goldoni (adapted and directed by Jean-Louis Benoît), Nos solitudes (directed by Delphine Hecquet), Le Pain dur by Paul Claudel (directed by Salomé Broussky) and La Maladie de la famille M by Fausto Paravidino (directed by Théo Askolovitch).

In 2022 she worked with Cédric Klapisch in En corps and the second series of Arte's Jeux d'influence directed by Jean-Xavier de Lestrade. She has also played Clara, one of the leads in Camille Japy's Sous le tapis. In 2023, she appeared in La pie voleuse directed by Robert Guédiguian and Little Jaffna directed by Lawrence Valin. On stage she appeared in Zoé (et maintenant les vivants) at Théâtre Ouvert, directed by Théo Askolovitch.

== Selected filmography ==
=== Film ===
==== Features ====
- 2018 : Le Doudou directed by Julien Hervé and Philippe Mechelen
- 2019 : Raoul Taburin directed by Pierre Godeau : Josyane aged 20
- 2020 : De Gaulle directed by Gabriel Le Bomin : Élisabeth de Miribel
- 2020 : Adieu les cons directed by Albert Dupontel : Clara
- 2020 : Le Discours directed by Laurent Tirard : Isabelle
- 2022 : En corps directed by Cédric Klapisch : Aria
- 2022 : Don't watch directed by Abel Danan : Camille
- 2023 : Sous le tapis directed by Camille Japy : Clara
- 2023: La pie voleuse directed by Robert Guédiguian: Jennyfer
- 2024: Little Jaffna directed by Lawrence Valin: Chloé
- 2026: A Woman Today directed by Robert Guédiguian: Juliette

==== Shorts ====
- 2019 : Relai directed by Suzanne Clément : Jeanne

=== TV ===
==== Series ====
- 2017 : Dix pour cent : Violaine
- 2019 - 2022 : Jeux d'influence de Jean-Xavier de Lestrade : Chloé Forrest
- 2020 : La Révolution : Élise de Montargis
- 2021 : Germinal : Cécile Grégoire
- 2022: Jeux d'influence, season 2 directed by Jean Xavier de Lestrade: Chloé Forrest

==== TV films ====
- 2016 : The law of ... directed by Didier Le Pêcheur : Flora

=== Clips ===
- 2017 : Moïra Gynt de Tim Dup

== Theatre ==
- 2015 : La Tragédie du vengeur de Middleton by Jerzy Klesyk
- 2016 : La vie n'est pas une chose facile by Eugen Jebeleanu
- 2017 : Et les colosses tomberont by Jean-Louis Martinelli
- 2018 : N'avoir rien accompli et mourir exténué by Frédéric Bélier-Garcia
- 2018: Un dom Juan by Benjamin Voisin
- 2019 : Les Jumeaux vénitiens by Jean-Louis Benoît
- 2020 : Nos solitudes by Delphine Hecquet
- 2022 : La Maladie de la famille M, Fausto Paravidino, by Théo Askolovitch at Théâtre de la Cité internationale
- 2022 : Le Pain dur by Paul Claudel, directed by Salomé Broussky
- 2023 : Zoé (et maintenant les vivants) by Théo Askolovitch, Théâtre Ouvert
