= Guillotine =

Apparatus designed for carrying out executions by beheading

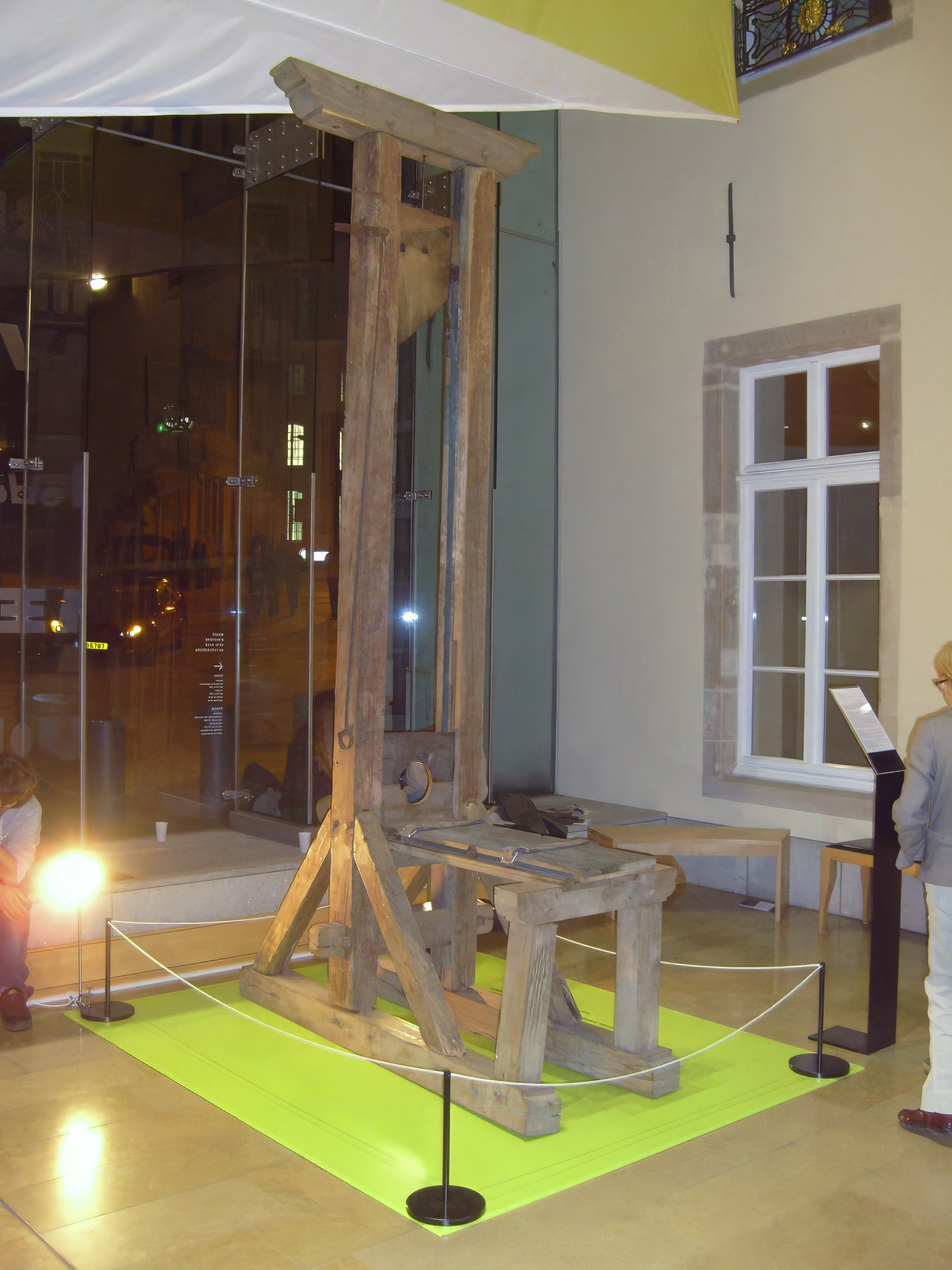
The guillotine used in Luxembourg between 1798 and 1821

A guillotine (/ˈɡɪləˌtiːn/ GHIL-ə-teen, /ˌɡɪləˈtiːn/ GHIL-ə-TEEN, or /ˈɡiːjəˌtiːn/ GHEE-yə-teen) is an apparatus designed for effectively carrying out executions by beheading. The device consists of a tall, upright frame with a weighted and angled blade suspended at the top. The condemned person is secured with a pillory at the bottom of the frame, holding the position of the neck directly below the blade. The blade is then released, swiftly and forcefully decapitating the victim with a single, clean pass; the head falls into a basket or other receptacle below.

The guillotine is best known for its use in France, particularly during the French Revolution (1789-1799), where the revolution's supporters celebrated it as the people's avenger and the revolution's opponents vilified it as the pre-eminent symbol of the violence of the Reign of Terror. While the name "guillotine" dates from this period, similar devices had been in use elsewhere in Europe over several centuries. Use of an oblique blade and the pillory-like restraint device set this type of guillotine apart from others. Display of severed heads had long been one of the most common ways European sovereigns exhibited their power to their subjects.

The design of the guillotine was intended to make capital punishment more reliable and less painful in accordance with new Enlightenment ideas of human rights. Prior to use of the guillotine, France had inflicted manual beheading and a variety of methods of execution, many of which were more gruesome and required a high level of precision and skill to carry out successfully.

After its adoption, the device remained France's standard method of judicial execution until the abolition of capital punishment in 1981. The last person to be executed by a government via guillotine was Hamida Djandoubi, a Tunisian murderer, on 10 September 1977 in France.

== History ==
=== Precursors ===
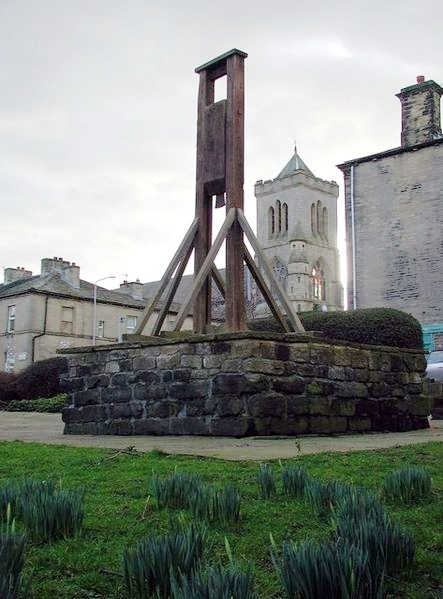
A replica of the Halifax Gibbet on its original site in Halifax, West Yorkshire, in 2008

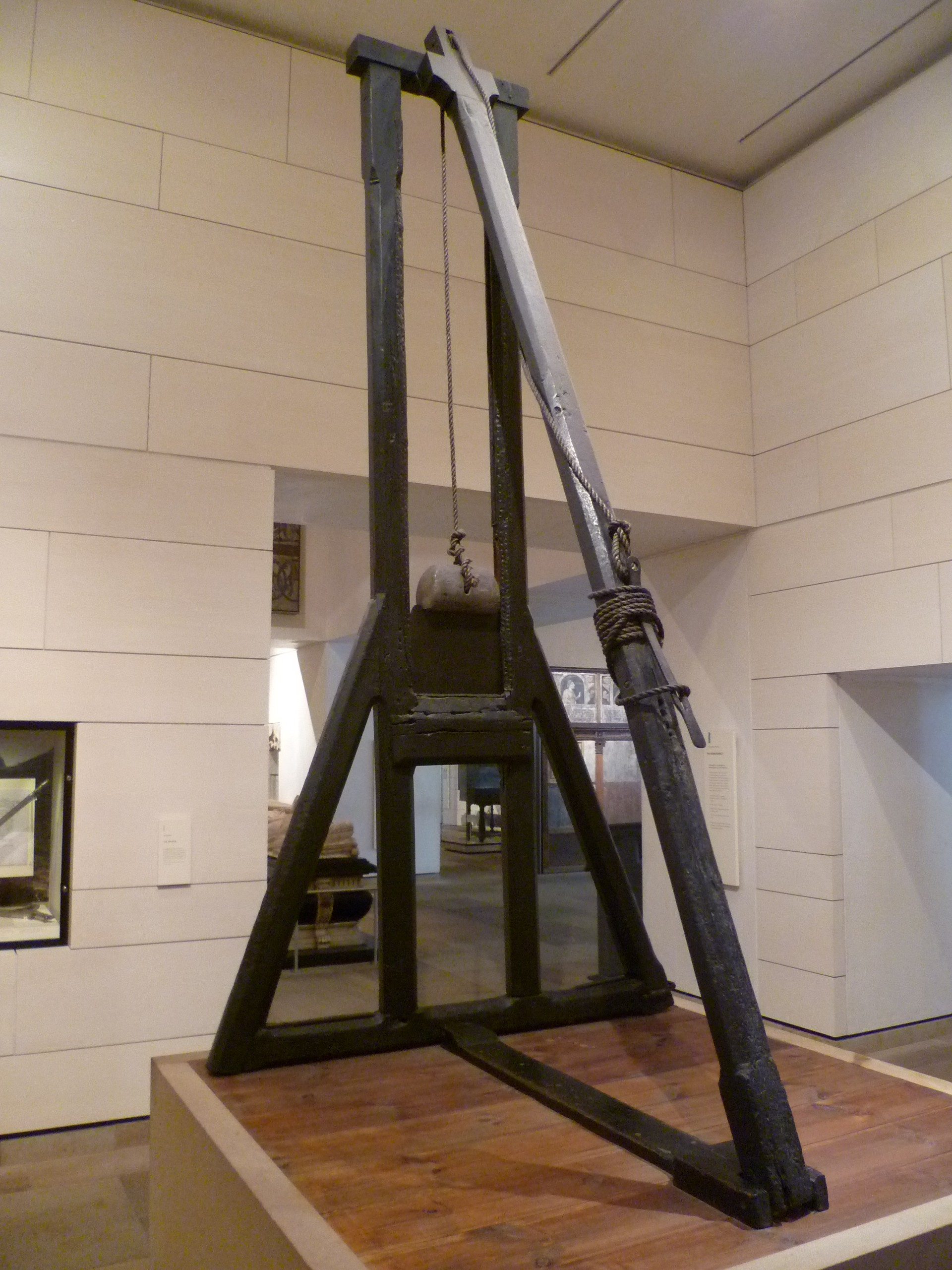
The original Maiden, introduced in 1564 and used until 1716, now on display at the National Museum of Scotland in Edinburgh

The use of beheading machines in Europe long predates such use during the French Revolution in 1792. An early example of the principle is found in the Old French High History of the Holy Grail, dated to about 1210. Although the device is imaginary, its function is clear. The text says:

Within these three openings are the hallows set for them. And behold what I would do to them if their three heads were therein ... She setteth her hand toward the openings and draweth forth a pin that was fastened into the wall, and a cutting blade of steel droppeth down, of steel sharper than any razor, and closeth up the three openings. "Even thus will I cut off their heads when they shall set them into those three openings thinking to adore the hallows that are beyond."

Viollet-Le-Duc provided a 15th-century illustration of a device closely resembling a guillotine, with a heavy block holding a horizontally-edged blade, which slid down two grooved uprights when the executioner cut a suspending cord with a knife. The utility of the device was uncertain; Viollet-le-Duc stated the horizontal blade edge could not produce the desired effect, so the executioner was also equipped with a sword.

The Halifax Gibbet in 16th century England was a wooden structure consisting of two wooden uprights, capped by a horizontal beam, of a total height of 4.5 metres (15 ft). The blade was an axe head weighing 3.5 kg (7.7 lb), attached to the bottom of a massive wooden block that slid up and down in grooves in the uprights. This device was mounted on a large square platform 1.25 metres (4 ft) high. It is not known when the Halifax Gibbet was first used; the first recorded execution in Halifax dates from 1280, but that execution may have been by sword, axe, or gibbet. The machine remained in use until Oliver Cromwell forbade capital punishment for petty theft.

A Hans Weiditz (1495–1537) woodcut illustration from the 1532 edition of Petrarch's De remediis utriusque fortunae, or "Remedies for Both Good and Bad Fortune" shows a device similar to the Halifax Gibbet in the background being used for an execution.

Holinshed's Chronicles of 1577 included a picture of "The execution of Murcod Ballagh near Merton in Ireland in 1307" showing a similar execution machine, suggesting its early use in Ireland.

The Maiden was constructed in 1564 for the Provost and Magistrates of Edinburgh, Scotland and was in use from April 1565 to 1710. One of those executed was James Douglas, 4th Earl of Morton, in 1581, and a 1644 publication began circulating the legend that Morton himself commissioned the Maiden after he had seen the Halifax Gibbet. The Maiden was readily dismantled for storage and transport, and it is now on display in the National Museum of Scotland.

== France ==
=== Etymology ===
For a period of time after its invention, the guillotine was called a louisette, named after its inventor Antoine Louis. However, it was later named after French physician and Freemason Joseph-Ignace Guillotin, who proposed on 10 October 1789 the use of a special device to carry out executions in France in a more humane manner. A death penalty opponent, he was displeased with the breaking wheel and other common, more grisly methods of execution and sought to persuade King Louis XVI to implement a less painful alternative. While not the device's inventor, Guillotin's name ultimately became an eponym for it. Contrary to popular myth, Guillotin did not die by guillotine but rather by natural causes.

=== Invention ===
French surgeon and physiologist Antoine Louis and German engineer Tobias Schmidt built a prototype for the guillotine. According to a memoir written by the grandson of Charles-Henri Sanson, Louis XVI suggested the use of a straight, angled blade instead of a curved one.

=== Introduction in France ===
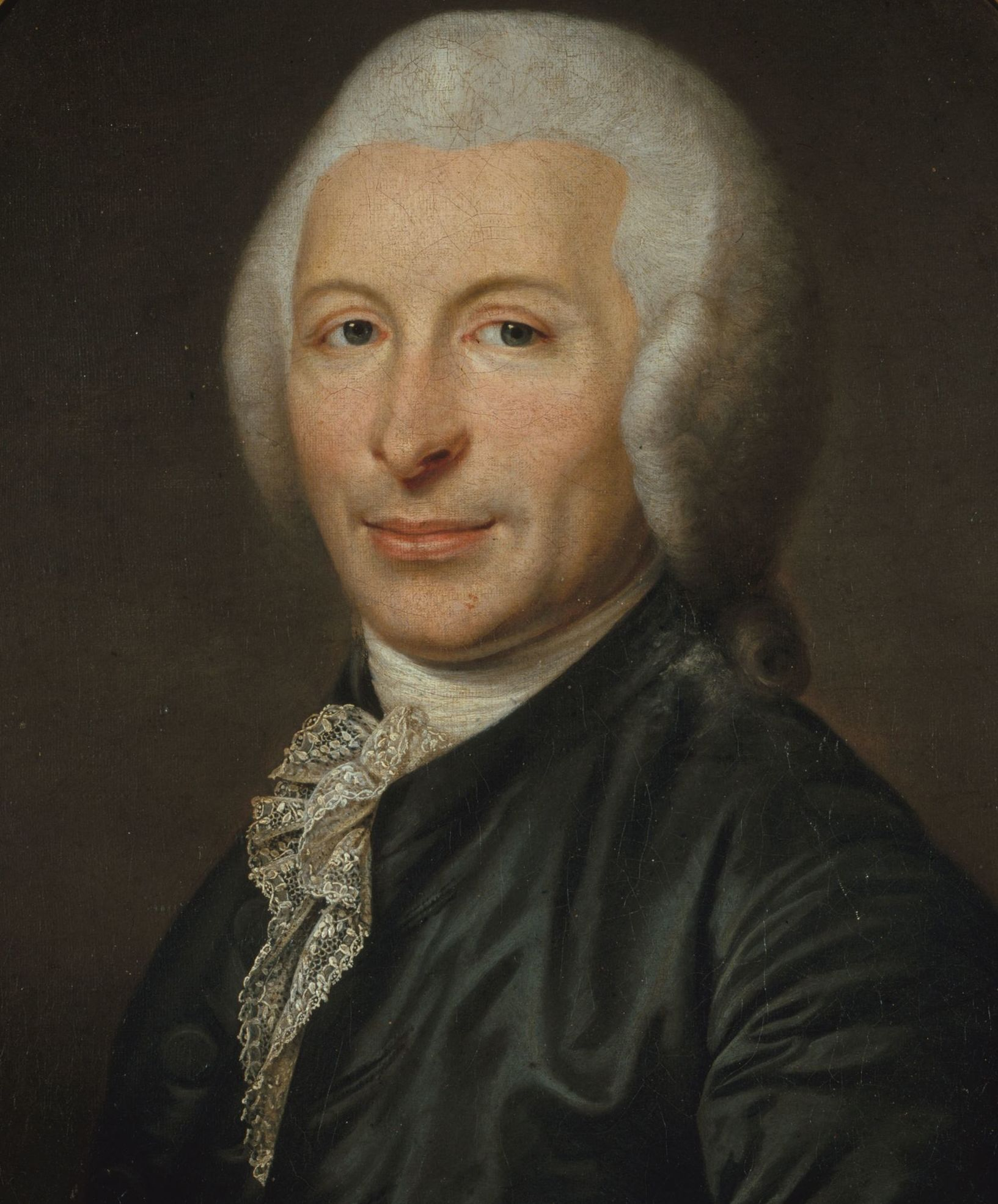
Portrait of Joseph-Ignace Guillotin after whom the guillotine was named

On 10 October 1789, physician Joseph-Ignace Guillotin proposed to the National Assembly that capital punishment should always take the form of decapitation "by means of a simple mechanism".

Sensing the growing discontent, Louis XVI banned the use of the breaking wheel. In 1791, as the French Revolution progressed, the National Assembly researched a new method to be used on all condemned people regardless of class, consistent with the idea that the purpose of capital punishment was simply to end life rather than to inflict unnecessary pain.

A committee formed under Antoine Louis, physician to the King and Secretary to the Academy of Surgery. Guillotin was also on the committee. The group was influenced by beheading devices used elsewhere in Europe, such as the Italian Mannaia (or Mannaja, which had been used since Roman times), the Scottish Maiden, and the Halifax Gibbet (3.5 kg). While many of these prior instruments crushed the neck or used blunt force to take off a head, a number of them also used a crescent blade to behead and a hinged two-part yoke to immobilize the victim's neck.

Laquiante, an officer of the Strasbourg criminal court, designed a beheading machine and employed Tobias Schmidt, a German engineer and harpsichord maker, to construct a prototype. Antoine Louis is also credited with the design of the prototype. France's official executioner, Charles-Henri Sanson, claimed in his memoirs that King Louis XVI, an amateur locksmith, recommended that the device employ an oblique blade rather than a crescent one, lest the blade not be able to cut through all necks; the neck of the king, who himself died by guillotine several years later, was offered up discreetly as an example. The first execution by guillotine was performed on a highwayman, Nicolas Jacques Pelletier, on 25 April 1792 in front of what is now Place de l'Hôtel de Ville, the city hall of Paris. All citizens condemned to die were from then on executed there, until the scaffold was moved on 21 August to the Place du Carrousel.

The machine was judged successful because it was considered a humane form of execution in contrast with more cruel methods used in the pre-revolutionary Ancien Régime. In France, before the invention of the guillotine, members of the nobility were beheaded with a sword or an axe, which often took two or more blows to kill the condemned. The condemned or their families would sometimes pay the executioner to ensure that the blade was sharp in order to achieve a quick and relatively painless death. Commoners were usually hanged, which could take many minutes.

In the early phase of the French Revolution, before the guillotine's adoption, the slogan À la lanterne (lit. 'To the lamp post!') symbolized popular justice in revolutionary France. The revolutionary radicals hanged officials and aristocrats from street lanterns and also employed more gruesome methods of execution, such as the wheel or burning at the stake.

Having only one method of civil execution for all regardless of class was also seen as an expression of equality among citizens. The guillotine was then the only civil legal execution method in France until abolition of the death penalty in 1981, apart from certain crimes against the security of the state, or for the death sentences passed by military courts, which entailed execution by firing squad.

=== Reign of Terror ===
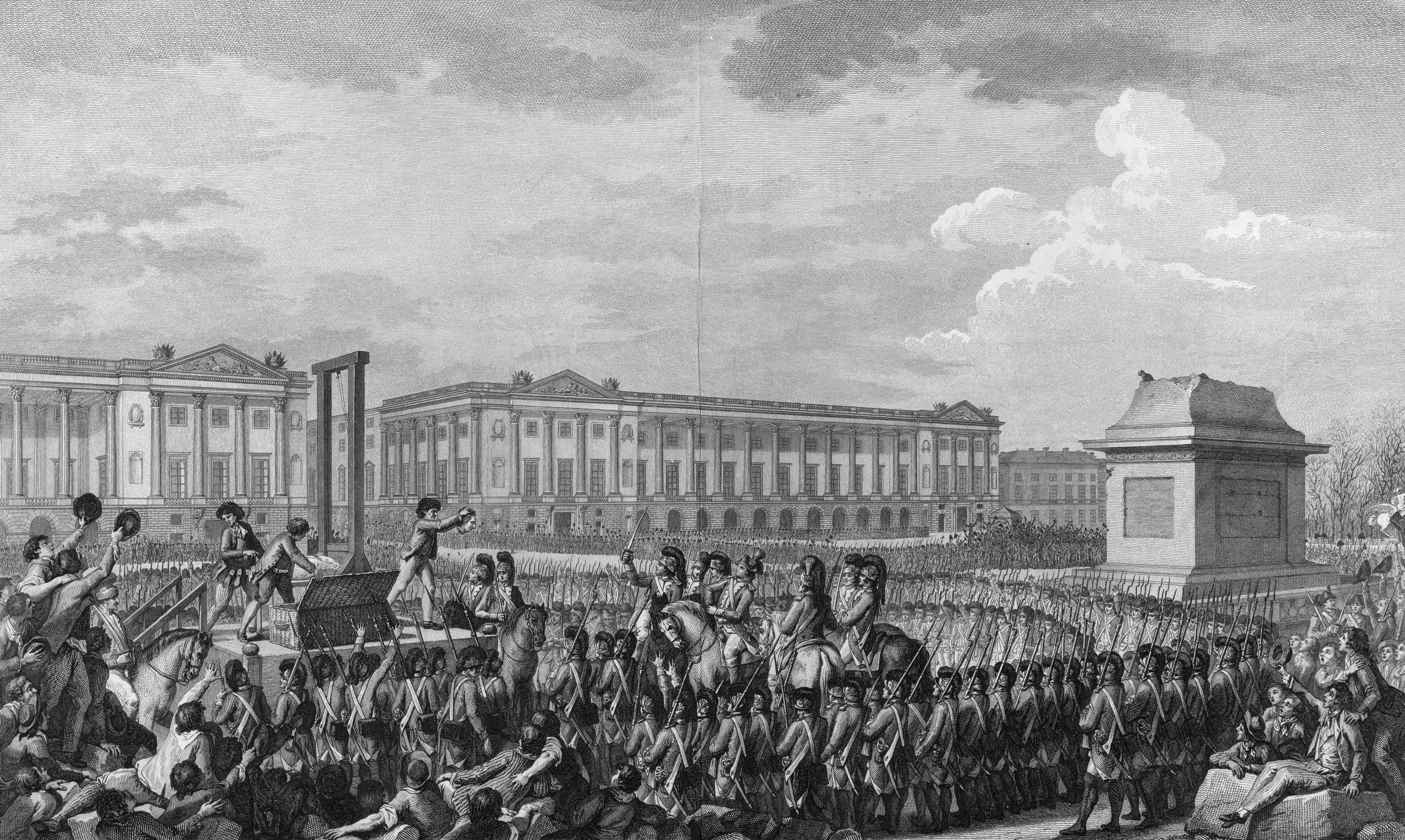
The execution of Louis XVI

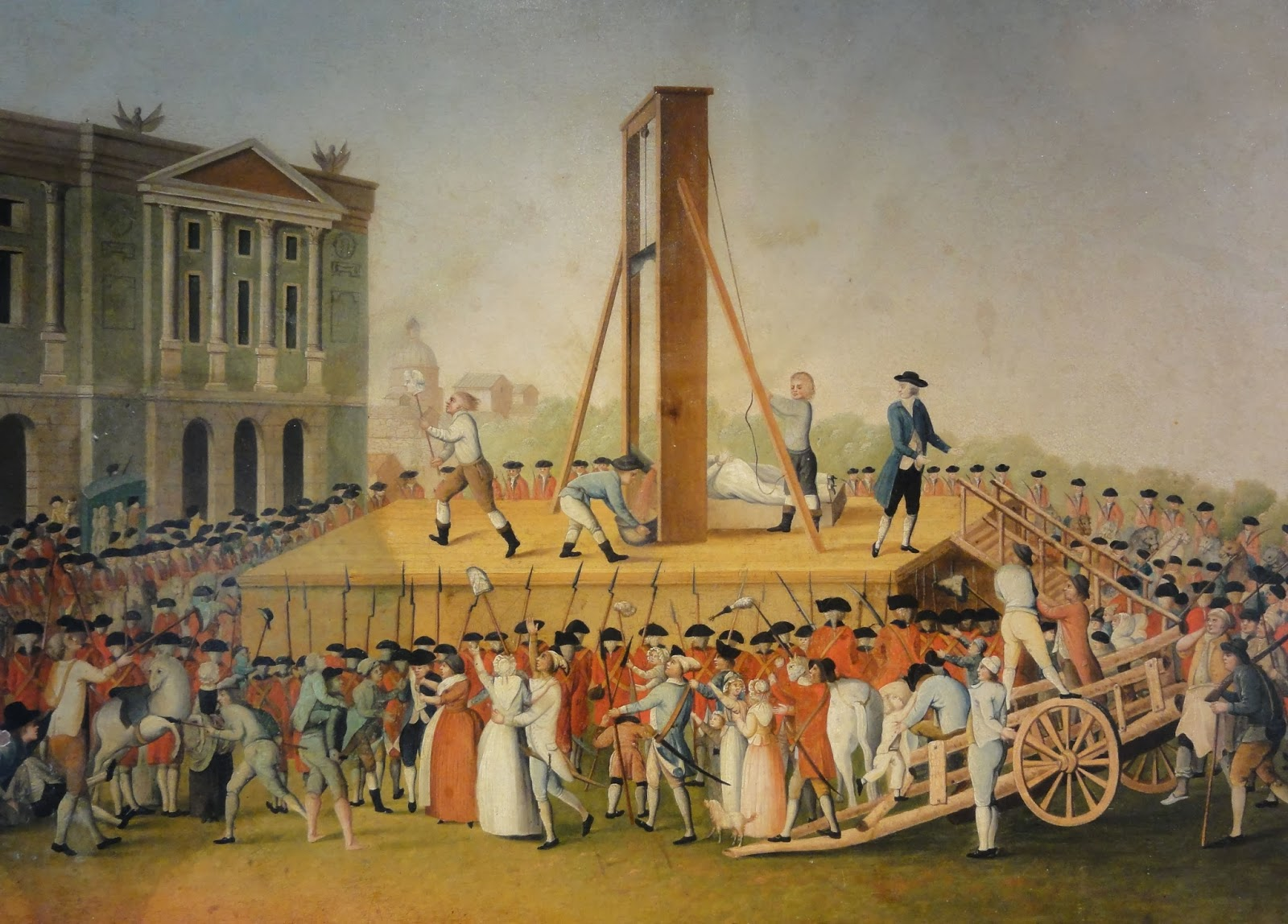
Queen Marie Antoinette's execution on 16 October 1793

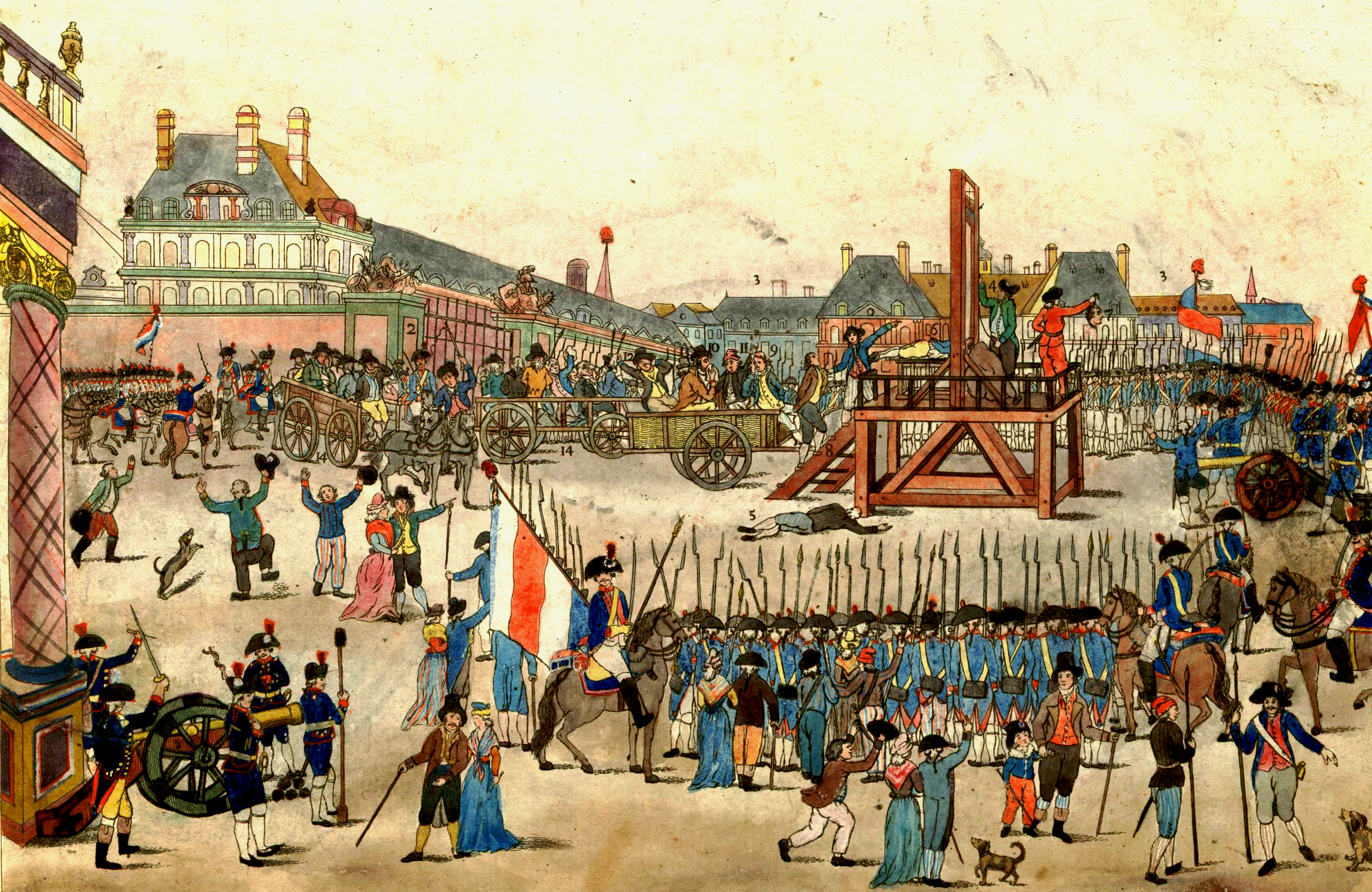
The execution of Maximilien Robespierre; the person who had just been executed in this drawing is Georges Couthon. Robespierre is the figure marked "10" in the tumbrel, holding a handkerchief to his shattered jaw.

Louis Collenot d'Angremont was a royalist famed for having been the first guillotined for his political ideas, on 21 August 1792. Before and during the Reign of Terror (between September 1793 and July 1794) about 17,000 people were guillotined, including former Queen Marie Antoinette, who was executed at the guillotine on October 16, 1793; her husband Louis Capet (former King Louis XVI) was guillotined on January 21, 1793. Towards the end of the Terror in 1794, revolutionary leaders such as Georges Danton, Saint-Just and Maximilien Robespierre were sent to the guillotine. Most of the time, executions in Paris were carried out in the Place de la Revolution (former Place Louis XV and current Place de la Concorde); the guillotine stood in the corner near the Hôtel Crillon where the City of Brest Statue can be found today. The machine was moved several times, to the Place de la Nation and the Place de la Bastille, but returned, particularly for the execution of the King and for Robespierre.

For a time, executions by guillotine attracted great crowds of spectators, with vendors selling programs listing the names of the condemned. Moreover, the guillotine symbolized revolutionary ideals: equality in death equivalent to equality before the law; open and demonstrable revolutionary justice; and the destruction of privilege under the Ancien Régime, which used separate forms of execution for nobility and commoners. The Parisian sans-culottes, then the popular public face of lower-class patriotic radicalism, thus considered the guillotine a positive force for revolutionary progress.

=== Resumption of use ===
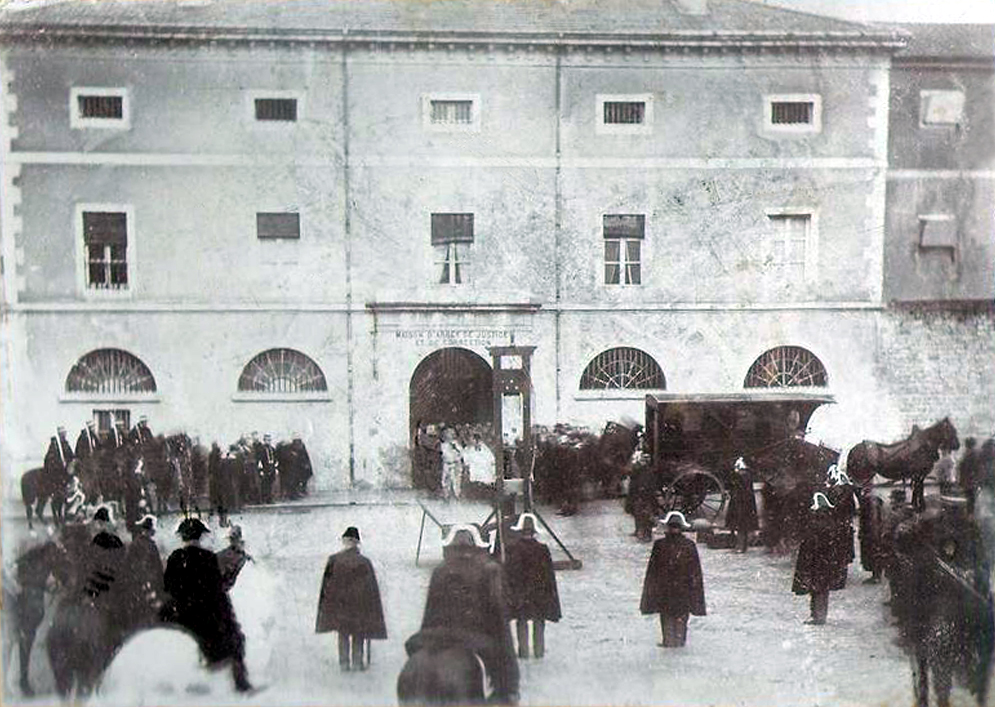
A 20 April 1897 public execution by guillotine in front of the prison of Lons-le-Saunier. The man about to be beheaded, Pierre Vaillat, robbed and killed two elder siblings on Christmas Day 1896. He was convicted of his crimes on 9 March 1897.

After the French Revolution, executions resumed in the city centre. On 4 February 1832, the guillotine was moved behind the Church of Saint-Jacques-de-la-Boucherie, before being moved again, to the Grande Roquette prison, on 29 November 1851.

In the late 1840s, the Tussaud brothers Joseph and Francis, gathering relics for Madame Tussauds wax museum, visited the aged Henry-Clément Sanson, grandson of the executioner Charles-Henri Sanson, from whom they obtained parts, the knife and lunette, of one of the original guillotines used during the Reign of Terror. The executioner had "pawned his guillotine, and got into woeful trouble for alleged trafficking in municipal property".

On 6 August 1909, the guillotine was used at the junction of the Boulevard Arago and the Rue de la Santé, behind the La Santé Prison.

The last public guillotining in France was of Eugen Weidmann, who was convicted of six murders. He was beheaded on 17 June 1939 outside the prison Saint-Pierre, rue Andre Mignot 5 at Versailles, which is now the Tribunal Judiciaire de Versailles. The proceedings caused "disgusting" and "unruly" behaviour among spectators. The "hysterical behavior" by spectators was so scandalous that French president Albert Lebrun immediately banned all future public executions.

Marie-Louise Giraud (17 November 1903 – 30 July 1943) was one of the last women to be executed in France. Giraud was convicted in Vichy France and was guillotined on 30 July 1943 for having performed 27 abortions in the Cherbourg area. Her story was dramatized in the 1988 film Story of Women directed by Claude Chabrol.

The guillotine remained the official method of execution in France until the death penalty was abolished in 1981. The final three guillotinings in France before its abolition were those of child-murderers Christian Ranucci (on 28 July 1976) in Marseille, Jérôme Carrein (on 23 June 1977) in Douai and torturer–murderer Hamida Djandoubi (on 10 September 1977) in Marseille. Djandoubi's death was the last time that the guillotine was used for an execution by any government.

=== Overseas department, overseas regions and colonies ===
In the Western Hemisphere, the guillotine saw only limited use. The only recorded guillotine execution in North America north of the Caribbean took place on the French island of St. Pierre in 1889, of Joseph Néel, with a guillotine brought in from Martinique.

In the Caribbean, it was used rarely in Guadeloupe and Martinique; its last use in the region was at Fort-de-France in 1965. In South America, the guillotine was only used in French Guiana, where about 150 people were beheaded between 1850 and 1945: most of them were convicts exiled from France and incarcerated within the "bagne", or penal colonies.

Within the Southern Hemisphere, it worked in New Caledonia (which had a bagne too until the end of the 19th century) and at least twice in Tahiti.

In the New Hebrides, administered as a condominium with the United Kingdom, the French authorities used the guillotine on only one occasion. On 28 Jul 1931, six Tonkinese plantation workers were publicly guillotined in Port Vila for the murder of their overseer and another worker.

== Germany ==
In Germany, the guillotine is known as Fallbeil ("falling axe") or Köpfmaschine ("beheading machine") and was used in various German states from the 19th-century onwards, becoming the preferred method of execution in Napoleonic times in many parts of the country. The guillotine, axe and the firing squad were the legal methods of execution during the era of the German Empire (1871–1918) and the subsequent Weimar Republic (1919–1933).

The original German guillotines resembled the French Berger 1872 model, but they eventually evolved into sturdier and more effective machines. Built primarily of metal instead of wood, these new guillotines had heavier blades than their French predecessors and thus could use shorter uprights as well. Officials could also conduct multiple executions faster, thanks to a more effective blade recovery system and the eventual removal of the tilting board (bascule). Those deemed likely to struggle were backed slowly into the device from behind a curtain to prevent them from seeing it prior to the execution. A metal screen covered the blade as well in order to conceal it from the sight of the condemned.

Nazi Germany used the guillotine between 1933 and 1945 to execute 16,500 prisoners, 10,000 of them in 1944 and 1945 alone. Notable political victims executed by the guillotine under the Nazi government included Marinus van der Lubbe, a Dutch communist blamed for the Reichstag fire and executed by guillotine in January 1934. The Nazi government also guillotined Sophie Scholl, who was convicted of high treason after distributing anti-Nazi pamphlets at LMU Munich with her brother Hans, and other members of the German student resistance group, the White Rose.

The penultimate time the guillotine was used in West Germany was in the execution of Richard Schuh, on 18 February 1949, at six o'clock in the morning, in the courtyard of the prison at 18 Doblerstraße in Tübingen. The last time it was used in West Germany was for the execution of two convicted murderers, 29-year-old Robert Amelung and 39-year-old Peter Steinhauer, who were guillotined in Hamburg on 9 May 1949. It was last used in East Germany in September 1967 when the murderers Paul Beirau and Günter Herzfeld were executed. The Stasi used the guillotine in East Germany between 1950 and 1966 for secret executions.

== Elsewhere ==
A number of countries, primarily in Europe, continued to employ this method of execution into the 19th and 20th centuries, but they ceased to use it before France did in 1977.

In Antwerp, Belgium, the last person to be beheaded was Francis Kol. Convicted of robbery and murder, he received his punishment on 8 May 1856. During the period from 19 March 1798 to 30 March 1856, there were 19 beheadings in Antwerp.

In Utrecht, the Netherlands, the first person to be beheaded was Anthony van Benthem, a criminal confined in a mental institution. He killed a cellmate after being called a sodomite. He was executed at Paardenveld on 27 July 1811. Back then, the Netherlands was part of the French Empire, Utrecht being in the Zuyderzée department.

In Switzerland, it was used for the last time by the canton of Obwalden in the execution of murderer Hans Vollenweider in 1940.

In Greece, the guillotine (along with the firing squad) was introduced as a method of execution in 1834; it was last used in 1913.

In Sweden, beheading became the mandatory method of execution in 1866. The guillotine replaced manual beheading in 1903, and it was used only once, in the execution of murderer Alfred Ander in 1910 at Långholmen Prison, Stockholm. Ander was also the last person to be executed in Sweden before capital punishment was abolished there in 1921.

In South Vietnam, after the Diệm regime enacted the 10/59 Decree in 1959, mobile special military courts were dispatched to the countryside in order to intimidate the rural population; they allegedly used guillotines, which had belonged to the former French colonial power, in order to carry out death sentences on the spot. One such alleged guillotine is still on show at the War Remnants Museum in Ho Chi Minh City.

In the United States in 1996, Georgia State Representative Doug Teper unsuccessfully sponsored a bill to replace that state's electric chair with the guillotine.

In recent years, a limited number of individuals have killed themselves using self-constructed guillotines.

== Controversy ==
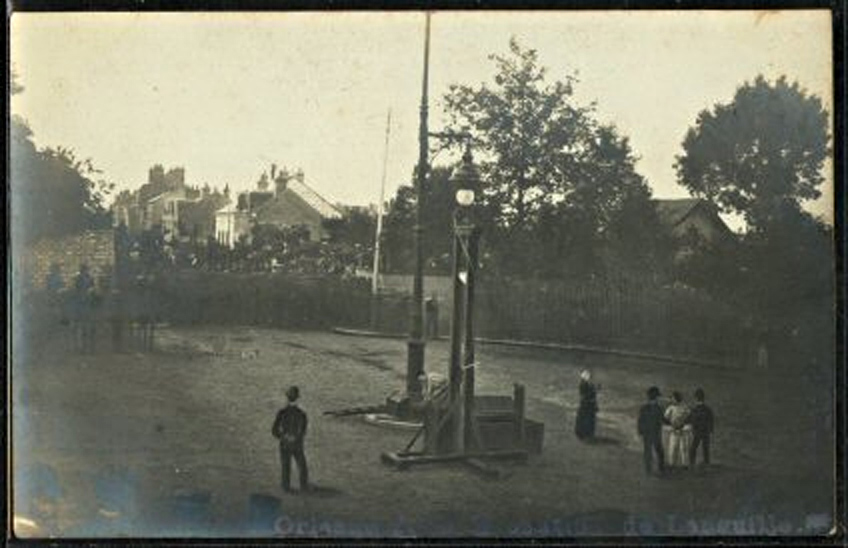
A retouched photo of the execution of Languille in 1905 with foreground figures painted in over the original photo

Ever since the guillotine's first use, there has been debate as to whether the guillotine provided a swift and painless death as Guillotin had hoped. With previous methods of execution that were intended to be painful, few expressed concern about the level of suffering that they inflicted. However, because the guillotine was designed to be more humane, the issue of whether the condemned experiences pain has been examined thoroughly and remains controversial. Some eyewitness accounts of guillotine executions suggest that awareness may persist momentarily after decapitation, but there is no scientific consensus on the matter.

=== Living heads ===
Gabriel Beaurieux, a physician who observed the head of executed prisoner Henri Languille, wrote on 28 June 1905:

Here, then, is what I was able to note immediately after the decapitation: the eyelids and lips of the guillotined man worked in irregularly rhythmic contractions for about five or six seconds. This phenomenon has been remarked by all those finding themselves in the same conditions as myself for observing what happens after the severing of the neck ...

I waited for several seconds. The spasmodic movements ceased. [...] It was then that I called in a strong, sharp voice: "Languille!" I saw the eyelids slowly lift up, without any spasmodic contractions – I insist advisedly on this peculiarity – but with an even movement, quite distinct and normal, such as happens in everyday life, with people awakened or torn from their thoughts.

Next Languille's eyes very definitely fixed themselves on mine and the pupils focused themselves. I was not, then, dealing with the sort of vague dull look without any expression, that can be observed any day in dying people to whom one speaks: I was dealing with undeniably living eyes which were looking at me. After several seconds, the eyelids closed again [...].

It was at that point that I called out again and, once more, without any spasm, slowly, the eyelids lifted and undeniably living eyes fixed themselves on mine with perhaps even more penetration than the first time. Then there was a further closing of the eyelids, but now less complete. I attempted the effect of a third call; there was no further movement – and the eyes took on the glazed look which they have in the dead.

== Names for the guillotine ==
During the span of its usage, the French guillotine has gone by many names, some of which include:

- La Monte-à-regret (The Regretful Climb)
- Le Rasoir National (The National Razor)
- Le Vasistas or La Lucarne (The Fanlight)
- La Veuve (The Widow)
- Le Moulin à Silence (The Silence Mill)
- Louisette or Louison (from the name of prototype designer Antoine Louis)
- Madame La Guillotine
- Mirabelle (from the name of Mirabeau)
- La Bécane (The Machine)
- Le Massicot (The Paper Trimmer)
- La Cravate à Capet (Capet's Necktie, Capet being Louis XVI)
- La Raccourcisseuse Patriotique (The Patriotic Shortener)
- La demi-lune (The Half-Moon)
- Les Bois de Justice (Timbers of Justice)
- La Bascule à Charlot (Charlot's Rocking-chair)
- Le Prix Goncourt des Assassins (The Goncourt Prize for Murderers)

== See also ==
- Bals des victimes
- Capital punishment in France
- Halifax Gibbet
- Henri Désiré Landru
- Rozalia Lubomirska
- Marcel Petiot
- Plötzensee Prison
- Jozef Raskin
- Use of capital punishment by nation
- Eugen Weidmann
