= Joseph-Ignace Guillotin =

French physician, politician and freemason (1738 – 1814)

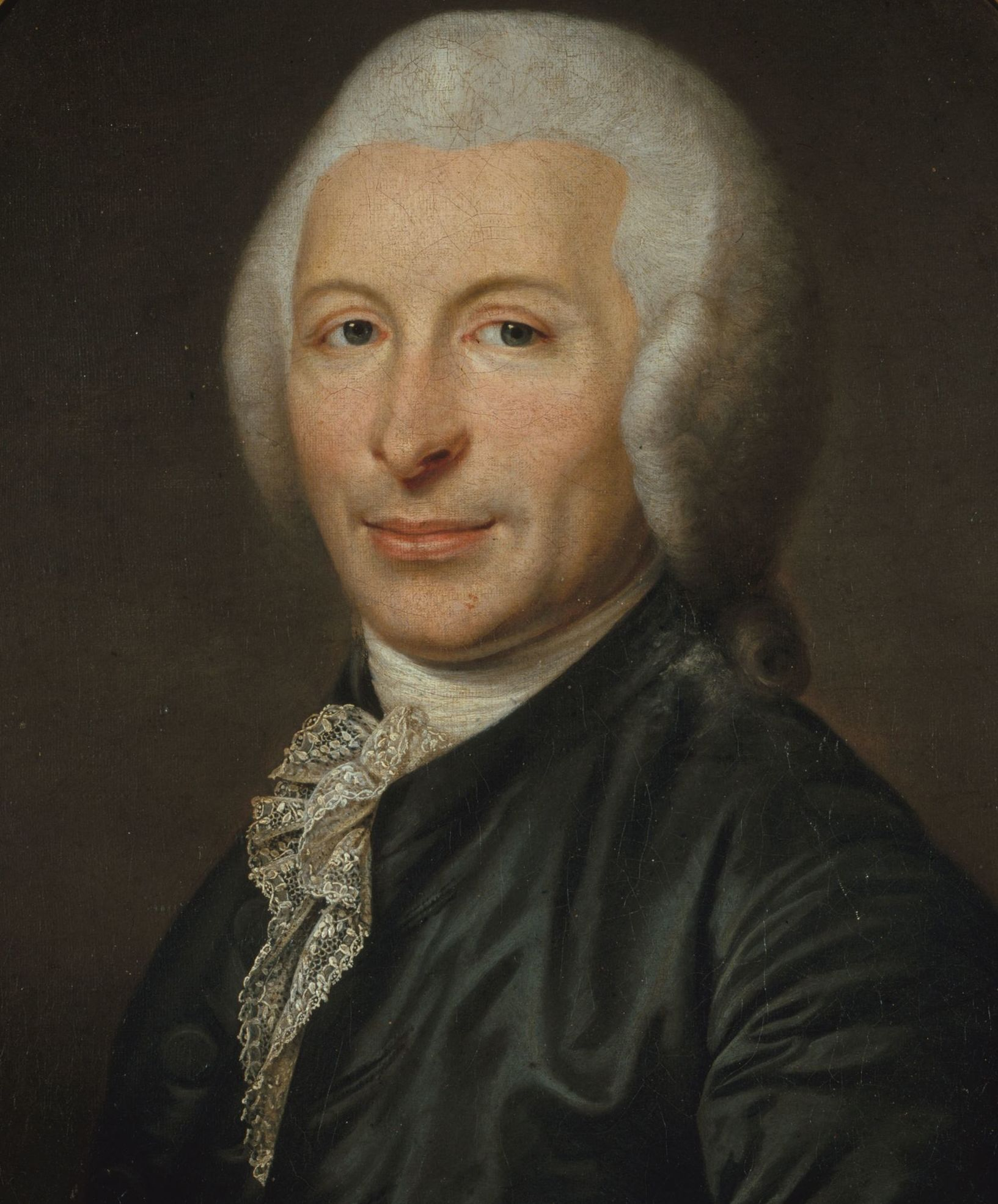
- Dr. Joseph-Ignace Guillotin (Musée Carnavalet, Paris)
- Born: 28 May 1738; Saintes, France
- Died: 26 March 1814 (aged 75); Paris, France
- Resting place: Père Lachaise Cemetery
- Citizenship: France
- Education: Irish College, Bordeaux; Reims University; University of Paris
- Occupation: Physician
- Known for: Proposing a painless method for executions, inspiring the guillotine
- Children: 2

Joseph-Ignace Guillotin (French: [ʒozɛf iɲas ɡijɔtɛ̃]; 28 May 1738 – 26 March 1814) was a French physician, politician, and freemason who proposed on 10 October 1789 the use of a device to carry out executions in France, as a less painful method of execution than existing methods. Although he did not invent the guillotine and opposed the death penalty, his name became an eponym for it. The actual inventor of the prototype was a French physician, Antoine Louis.

== Early life and education ==
Guillotin was born on 28 May 1738 in Saintes, France, the second son of Joseph-Alexandre Guillotin and Catherine Agatha Martin. Legend has it that he was born prematurely because his mother was in distress after hearing the screams of a man being tortured to death on the breaking wheel.

Guillotin's early education was by the Jesuits in Bordeaux and he earned a Master of Arts degree at the College of Aquitaine of the University of Bordeaux in December 1761. The essay that he wrote to earn the degree impressed the Jesuits so much that they invited him to become a professor of literature at the Irish College in Bordeaux. However, he left after a few years and travelled to Paris to study medicine, becoming a pupil of Antoine Petit. He gained a diploma from the faculty at Reims in 1768 and his doctorate at the School of Medicine in Paris in 1770, which also gave him the title of Doctor-Regent. This allowed him to teach medicine in Paris.

== Career ==
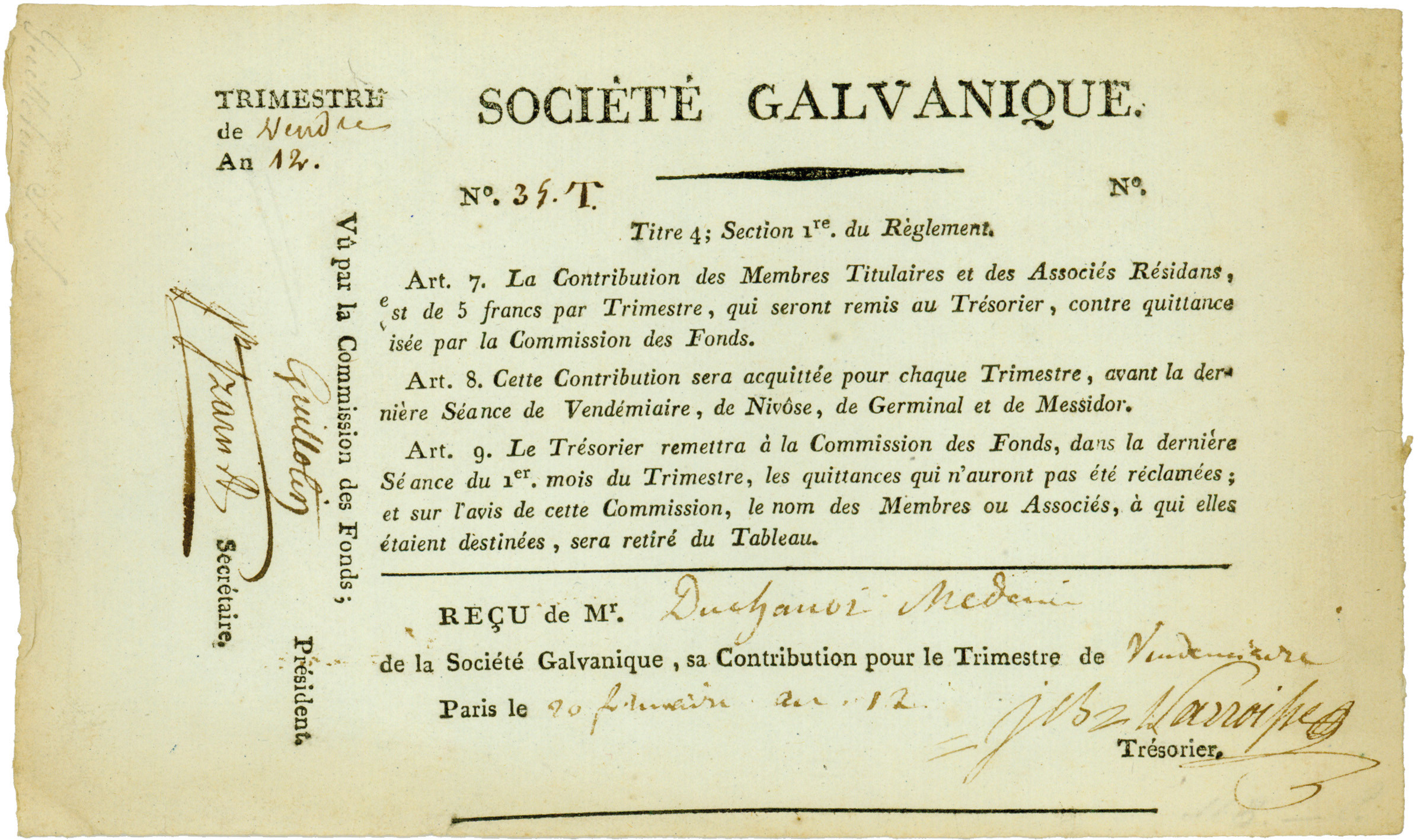
Quittance of the Société Galvanique, issued 20. February 1803, signed by Joseph-Ignace Guillotin as President

In Paris, Guillotin became a well-known physician. By 1775, he was concerned with issues of torture and death. That year, he wrote a memo proposing that criminals be used as subjects in medical experiments. Although he recognised that as cruel, he considered it preferable to being put to death. In 1784, when Franz Mesmer began to publicize his theory of "animal magnetism", which was considered offensive by many, Louis XVI appointed a commission to investigate it and Guillotin was appointed a member, along with Jean Sylvain Bailly, Antoine Laurent de Jussieu, Antoine Lavoisier, and Benjamin Franklin. The commission declared Mesmer to be a fraud, and this put Guillotin in the public eye.

=== Political career and guillotine ===
In December 1788, Guillotin drafted a pamphlet entitled Petition of the Citizens Living in Paris, concerning the proper constitution of the Estates-General. The French Parlement attempted to suppress his pamphlet and summoned him to give an account of his opinions, but the crowd during his testimony was very much in support of him, and he was released, which served to increase his popularity. On 2 May 1789, he became one of 10 Paris deputies in the Estates-General of 1789 and was secretary to the body from June 1789 to October 1791. On 20 June 1789, the National Assembly, as the members were now calling themselves, found itself locked out of its chamber. Guillotin suggested they reconvene in a nearby jeu de paume court, where the members swore the Tennis Court Oath, vowing "not to separate and to reassemble wherever circumstances require, until the Constitution of the kingdom is established".

As a member of the assembly, Guillotin initially directed his attention towards medical reform. As a member of the Poverty Committee, he toured the Hôtel-Dieu and contributed to the report that exposed the unsanitary conditions there. He also became first chair of the Health Committee and submitted a bill for medical reform in 1791.

At the same time, he was also concerned with criminal law reform. His experiences as a doctor had led him to oppose capital punishment: at first, he attempted to abolish it, but was unsuccessful. At that time, beheading in France was typically by axe or sword, which did not always cause immediate death. Additionally, beheading was reserved for the nobility, while commoners were typically hanged, which could take a long time, as the techniques whereby the victim's neck was broken by the noose had not yet been invented. Other methods included burning at the stake, the breaking wheel, death by boiling, and dismemberment. Guillotin realised that, if he could not eliminate executions, he could at least make them more humane.

On 10 October 1789, he proposed that "the criminal shall be decapitated; this will be done solely by means of a simple mechanism." The "mechanism" was defined as "a machine that beheads painlessly". His proposal appeared in the Royalist periodical, Les Actes des Apôtres. In all, Guillotin proposed six articles:

1. All punishments for the same class of crime shall be the same, regardless of the criminal (i.e., there would be no privilege for the nobility)
2. When the death sentence is applied, it will be by decapitation, carried out by a machine
3. The family of the guilty party will not suffer any legal discrimination
4. It will be illegal to anyone to reproach the guilty party's family about his/her punishment
5. The property of the convicted shall not be confiscated
6. The bodies of those executed shall be returned to the family if so requested

Guillotin assumed that, if a fair system was established where the only method of capital punishment was by mechanical decapitation, then the public would feel more appreciative of their rights. Despite this proposal, Guillotin was opposed to the death penalty, and hoped that a more humane and less painful method of execution would be the first step towards total abolition. He also hoped that, as the decapitation machine would kill quickly without prolonged suffering, this would reduce the size and enthusiasm of crowds that often witnessed executions.

On 1 December 1789, Guillotin made a remark during a follow-up speech to the Assembly about capital punishment. He was quoted (or possibly misquoted) as saying, "Now, with my machine, I cut off your head in the twinkling of an eye, and you never feel it!" The statement quickly became a popular joke, and a few days after the debate a comic song about Guillotin and "his" machine circulated, forever tying his name to it, despite the fact that he was not at all involved in its design or construction. The Moniteur of 18 December 1789 deplored the joking but repeated Guillotin's "twinkling of an eye" statement for posterity.

The articles were fairly controversial as the rights of the criminals and their families had not previously been considered, but they were accepted over the course of several years, with the "decapitation by simple machine" finally being accepted on 3 June 1791, with the result that his proposals became law on 20 March 1792. Meanwhile, the Assembly had commissioned Antoine Louis to build such a device. His proposal was presented on 17 March, and the first executions using it took place on 25 April 1792. However, by October 1791, Guillotin had already retired from the Assembly, returning to practise medicine. During the Reign of Terror, he moved to Arras to become the director of the military hospital there, returning to Paris a year later.

Towards the end of the Reign of Terror, a letter from the Comte de Méré to Guillotin fell into the hands of the public prosecutor, Fouquier-Tinville in which the Count, who was to be executed, commended his wife and children to Guillotin's care. The authorities demanded Guillotin inform them of the whereabouts of the Count's wife and children. As Guillotin either would not or could not give the information, he was arrested and imprisoned. He was freed from prison in the general amnesty of 9 Thermidor (27 July) 1794 after Robespierre fell from power.

In November 1795, a letter was published in the Moniteur claiming that the guillotine's victims survived for several minutes after beheading. Guillotin was shocked, and for the remainder of his life, he deeply regretted that the machine was named after him. His continued efforts to abolish the death penalty were hampered by the widespread belief that as the very person who proposed using a decapitation machine he must surely be in favour of it.

=== Resumption of medical career ===
Guillotin became one of the first French doctors to support Edward Jenner's discovery of vaccination, and in 1805 was the chairman of the Central Vaccination Committee in Paris. He also founded one of the precursors of the National Academy of Medicine.

== Personal life ==
=== Family ===
The association with the guillotine so embarrassed Guillotin's family that they petitioned the French government to rename it; when the government refused, they instead changed their own family name. By coincidence, another person named Guillotin was indeed executed by the guillotine – he was J.M.V. Guillotin, a doctor of Lyon. This coincidence may have contributed to erroneous statements that J-I Guillotin was put to death on the machine that bears his name; however, in reality, Guillotin died at home in Paris in 1814 of natural causes, aged 75, specifically from a carbuncle, and is now buried in the Père-Lachaise Cemetery in Paris. He was married to Louise Saugrain, sister of the physician and chemist Antoine Saugrain.

=== Freemasonry ===
Joseph Guillotin was initiated into Freemasonry, in 1765 at "La Parfaite Union" lodge in Angoulême. Very active as a mason, he joined several other lodges. As a deputy of the Grand Lodge from 1772 he took part in the birth of the Grand Orient of France and attended all its conventions until 1790. In 1773, he became Worshipful Master of the lodge "La Concorde Fraternelle" in Paris. In 1776, he founded the "La Vérité" lodge and often attended Les Neuf Sœurs.

== In modern fiction ==
Guillotin features in Andrew Miller's Costa prize-winning novel Pure. He is also a primary character in the 1992 novel Dr Guillotine, written by the actor Herbert Lom. He is also the main character in the French drama series La Révolution.

== See also ==
- Royal Commission on Animal Magnetism – 1784 French scientific bodies' investigations involving systematic controlled trials
