= Little Jaffna (film) =

2024 crime film

- Directed by: Lawrence Valin
- Written by: Lawrence Valin; Yacine Badday; Arthur Beaupère
- Starring: Lawrence Valin; Puviraj Raveendran; Vela Ramamoorthy; Radhika Sarathkumar; Marilou Aussilloux
- Cinematography: Maxence Lemonnier
- Edited by: Guerric Catala; Anaïs Manuelli
- Music by: Maxence Dussère
- Release date: 6 September 2024 (Venice)
- Country: France
- Languages: French; Tamil

Little Jaffna is a 2024 French crime film co-written and directed by Lawrence Valin, in his feature film debut. It premiered at the 81st edition of the Venice Film Festival.

== Cast ==
- Lawrence Valin as Michael Beaulieu
- Puviraj Raveendran as Puvi
- Vela Ramamoorthy as Aya
- Radhika Sarathkumar as Amamma
- Marilou Aussilloux as Chloé
- Kawsie Chandra as Selvi
- Sajinthan Santhiran as Kaso
- Murugadoss Periassamy as Sendhil
- Laura Benson as DGSI Responsible (voice)

== Production ==
The film is an expansion of Valin's 2018 short of the same name. It was shot with a budget of about 250,000 euros. It was produced by Ex Nihilo and Mean Streets, with France 2 Cinéma serving as co-producer.

== Release ==
The film premiered at the 81st Venice International Film Festival, in the Critic's Week sidebar. It was screened in numerous film festivals, including Tokyo International Film Festival, Zurich Film Festival, Les Arcs Film Festival and Red Sea International Film Festival, in which it won the AlUla Audience Award.

== Reception ==
The Guardian's film critic Angelique Chrisafis referred to the film as 'one of the most innovative and surprising French gangster films this year' and Guillemette Odicino from Télérama described it as a 'highly stylised action and geopolitical immersion'.
