= Shepherd (film) =

- Theatrical release poster
- Directed by: Russell Owen
- Written by: Russell Owen
- Produced by: Karim Prince Tshibangu; Aslam Parvez
- Starring: Tom Hughes; Kate Dickie; Gaia Weiss; Greta Scacchi
- Cinematography: Richard Stoddard
- Edited by: Jim Page; Chris Thornton
- Music by: Callum Donaldson
- Production companies: Castle Valley Film; GC Films
- Distributed by: Darkland Distribution (United Kingdom)
- Release dates: 14 October 2021 (LFF); 26 November 2021 (United Kingdom)
- Country: United Kingdom
- Language: English

Shepherd is a 2021 British horror drama film written and directed by Russell Owen. The film stars Tom Hughes, Kate Dickie, Gaia Weiss and Greta Scacchi.

Shepherd had its world premiere at the BFI London Film Festival on 14 October 2021, and was released in the United Kingdom by Darkland Distribution on 26 November 2021.

== Plot ==
Widower Eric Black has recurring nightmares following the recent death of his pregnant wife Rachel. Thinking he needs some space, Eric answers a newspaper ad for work as a shepherd on a remote island in the Scottish Highlands. En route to the island, Eric drops by his childhood home but is rebuked by Glenys, his estranged mother, who blames the death of his father on Eric's decision to leave them for Rachel, whom she implied to have been adulterous. Following a vicious argument with Glenys, Eric throws his wedding ring into a lake and later breaks down after considering suicide.

Eric and his Border Collie Baxter are then ferried to the island by the half-sighted Fisher, who hands him a journal to record his thoughts. They settle into a dilapidated cottage by an unlit lighthouse. Eric soon finds a ring in a freshwater spring and, at the cottage, a shelf of journals identical to the one Fisher gave him. In one of the journals, he finds frantic writings about a witch on the island. During the night, Eric struggles to climb the stairs to his room due to severe acrophobia.

Strange events begin to occur. Eric wakes up the next day to see Rachel's old cup inexplicably filled with hot tea. After feeding the sheep, he spots Fisher entering the otherwise locked lighthouse and leaving the island in a hurry. One morning, Eric has a waking nightmare in which a demonic Glenys stabs him. When Baxter goes missing, he searches for him through heavy fog and finds an ancient luxury liner in a valley. On board, Eric picks up an old key and runs away after sensing the presence of a robed figure from his nightmares. While reading the journals, he finds a drawing of this figure, titled “The Wrecker”, holding a lamp to lure a ship to a rock, and is startled to also find a drawing of Baxter. Eric later discovers that the ring plucked from the spring is the wedding ring he threw away.

On the phone, Fisher implies that Eric is fated to be there as penance, making him confess that Rachel’s death was due to his severe alcoholism. Desperate to be saved, Eric uses the old key to the lighthouse and, after an arduous climb, turns on its light to Fisher’s dismay. As he exits, Eric finds the sheep ritualistically flayed and spots Baxter among them, but they all disappear the next day. When confronted by the robed figure, which takes on Rachel’s guise, Eric immolates it and the cottage with the lighter Rachel gave him. Eric swims out to a boat but her ghost drags him underwater.

Eric wakes up ashore and is taken to the police. When questioned, the full extent of his confession is revealed: due to drunk driving, the car carrying him and Rachel veered off to the edge of a cliff; taken over by acrophobia, Eric exited the car, causing it to be unbalanced and fall to the ocean with Rachel. Fisher phones Eric to say that while his penance for Rachel's death was over, she is angered that he broke the rules by escaping. It is shown that Fisher has murdered Glenys using Eric’s pocket knife and planted his journal as evidence. Hearing a wind howl, Eric opens the door to see that he is emerging from the lighthouse back on the island.

== Cast ==
- Tom Hughes as Eric Black, a grieving widower.
- Kate Dickie as Fisher, a half-sighted boat woman.
- Gaia Weiss as Rachel Black, Eric's deceased wife.
- Greta Scacchi as Glenys Black, Eric's estranged, widowed mother.

== Production ==
The film began filming in February 2019 and was shot in Scotland and Wales. The principal photography was shot on the Isle of Mull with the interior scenes shot at BBC Studios in Dumbarton. Additional photography (Second Unit) was shot in North Wales. Underwater scenes were shot at the Underwater Studio in Basildon, Essex.

== Release ==
Shepherd had its world premiere at the BFI London Film Festival on 14 October 2021, and was released in the United Kingdom on 26 November 2021, by Darkland Distribution.
