= Commercy =

- Subprefecture and commune
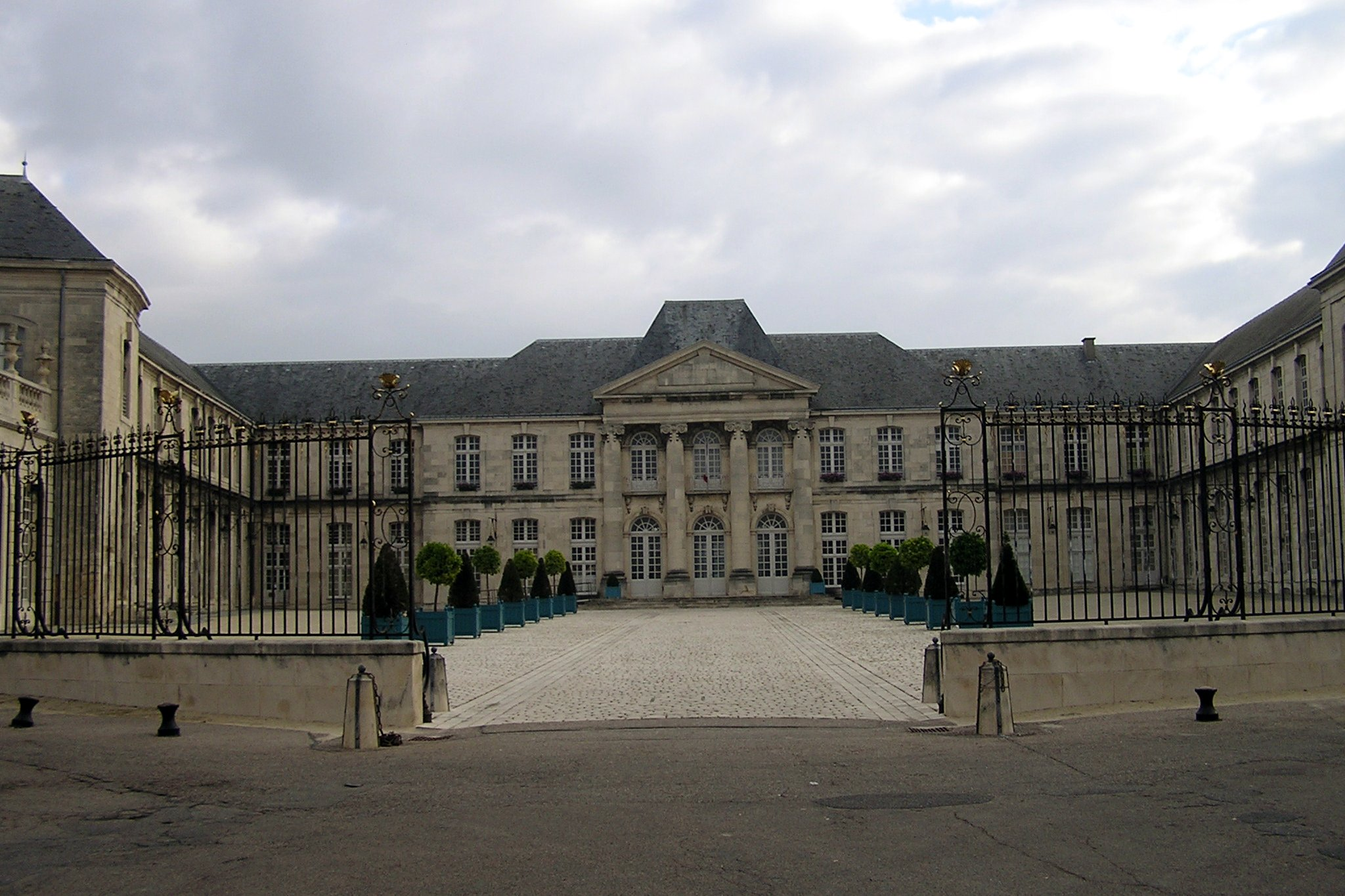
- The castle

- Coat of arms
- Location of Commercy
- Location within France Location within Grand Est
- Coordinates: 48°45′43″N 5°35′33″E
- Country: France
- Region: Grand Est
- Department: Meuse
- Arrondissement: Commercy
- Canton: Commercy
- Intercommunality: Commercy - Void - Vaucouleurs

Government
  - Mayor (2026–32): Philippe Rochat
- Area^{1}: 35.37 km^{2} (13.66 sq mi)
- Elevation: 232 m (761 ft)
- Highest elevation: 280 m (920 ft)
- Lowest elevation: 227 m (745 ft)
- Population (2023): 5,350
  - Density: 151/km^{2} (392/sq mi)
- Time zone: UTC+01:00 (CET)
  - Summer (DST): UTC+02:00 (CEST)
- INSEE/Postal code: 55122 /55200
- ^{1} French Land Register data, which excludes lakes, ponds, glaciers > 1 km^{2} (0.386 sq mi or 247 acres) and river estuaries.

Commercy (French pronunciation: [kɔmɛʁsi]) is a commune in the Meuse department in Grand Est in north-eastern France.

== History ==
Commercy dates back to the 9th century, and at that time its lords were dependent on the bishop of Metz. In 1544 it was besieged by Charles V in person. For some time the lordship was in the hands of Jean François Paul de Gondi, cardinal de Retz, who lived in the town for a number of years, and there composed his memoirs. From him it was purchased by Charles IV, Duke of Lorraine. In 1744 it became the residence of Stanisław Leszczyński, king of Poland, who spent a great deal of care on the embellishment of the town, castle and neighbourhood.

Commercy is the home of the Madeleines referred to by Marcel Proust in À la recherche du temps perdu.

== Population ==
Historical population
Year	Pop.	±% p.a.
1968	7,164	—
1975	6,989	−0.35%
1982	6,792	−0.41%
1990	6,404	−0.73%
1999	6,324	−0.14%
2007	6,498	+0.34%
2012	6,262	−0.74%
2017	5,536	−2.43%
2023	5,350	−0.57%
Source: INSEE

== People from Commercy ==
- Nicolas Durival (1723–1795), 18th-century Lorrain historian
- Nicolas Alaidon (1738–1827), curé de Toul, emigrated during the French Revolution, author of the Journal d'un prêtre pendant la Révolution (24 October 1738 – 1827).
- Henri Braconnot (1780–1855), chemist
- Henri Brocard (1845–1922), mathematician
- Georges Mangin (1873–1908), officer and explorer
- Benno Vigny (1889–1965), German-French scriptwriter and director
- Maurice Cloche (1907–1990), movie director
- Roger Lévy (1914–2006), Compagnon de la Libération
- Élisabeth de Miribel (1915–2005), Française libre
- Dominique Desseigne (1944), entrepreneur
- Pascal Vigneron (born 23 June 1963), organist, trumpeter, conductor, director of the Toul Bach Festival.
- Olivier Bluche (born 6 September 1958), French industrialist, philanthropist, landowner

== In fiction ==
Commercy is the key location for action in the 1964 film The Train although this did not use the town for filming purposes.

== Twin towns ==
It is twinned with the German town of Hockenheim.

== See also ==
- Communes of the Meuse department
