= Meander (film) =

2020 French science fiction film

- Film poster
- French: Méandre
- Directed by: Mathieu Turi
- Written by: Mathieu Turi
- Cinematography: Alan Duplantier
- Music by: Frédéric Poirier
- Distributed by: Gravitas Ventures
- Release dates: 11 October 2020 (Sitges Film Festival); 26 May 2021 (France); 9 July 2021 (United States)
- Running time: 90 minutes
- Country: France
- Languages: French, English
- Box office: $698,361

Meander (French: Méandre) is a 2020 French science fiction film written and directed by Mathieu Turi.

== Plot ==
On a deserted stretch of road somewhere in America, a Frenchwoman named Lisa accepts an offer of a lift from a man with a tattoo of a cross on his right hand. He introduces himself as Adam, and the pair make small talk; Lisa reveals that she had a daughter, Nina, who died young, and that today would have been her ninth birthday. A radio news report describes the main suspect in a serial killer case as having a tattoo that exactly resembles Adam's. Before Lisa can react, he slams on the brakes, causing her to smack her head on the dashboard and lose consciousness.

Lisa awakens to find herself in a network of cramped metal tunnels, dressed in a silver and black catsuit and with a strange luminescent bracelet attached to her wrist. She crawls through the tunnels looking for a way out, navigating her way past a series of traps including a crusher, flamethrowers, a flooded section of tunnel and a pit full of acid. She comes across the decayed corpses of several other victims wearing the same catsuits and with the strange glowing devices affixed to their wrists.

Hearing a man calling out ahead of her, Lisa discovers another live victim, who has clearly been there much longer than her, as he is dirty, dishevelled and babbling incoherently. Flamethrowers in the walls begin to power up, and the pair race toward the only safe part of the tunnel section, which is not big enough for both of them. After a brief fight, Lisa manages to occupy the safe space, while the man is killed by the flamethrowers. The one part of his body not incinerated is his hand, which bears the distinctive cross tattoo, and Lisa thus realises that the man was Adam and that she must have been unconscious for longer than she thought. She removes the bracelet from his wrist and finds beneath it an additional series of symbols tattoed on Adam's wrist, but is unable to make sense of them.

While Lisa recovers from her ordeals, a skull appears from the ceiling on the end of a mechanical tentacle and binds her wounds. It then attaches itself to a part of her suit and Lisa experiences a flashback of Adam attacking her with a knife, her being stabbed and falling from the car, and a strange light in the sky.

Lisa continues through the tunnels. After evading another trap in the form of a spinning blade, she finds herself being pursued by a zombie-like creature which is burnt all over and missing a hand, suggesting it is Adam's revivified corpse. Lisa evades the Adam-zombie and finds herself in a brightly-lit chamber where she experiences flashbacks of her life, including Nina's accidental death falling from a window.

The Adam-zombie reappears, and Lisa desperately tries to evade him. She reaches a section of tunnel with apparent daylight at the end, but the way is barred by razor wire. She tries to crawl through, but becomes hopelessly tangled in the wire. A flamethrower in the walls of the tunnel begins to warm up, and she braces herself to die, but at the last moment a trapdoor opens beneath her and she falls into darkness.

Lisa wakes up in the same chamber she started in. Giving up hope of escape, she draws out the symbols from Adam's wrist tattoos on the wall in her own blood, hoping the next victim might be able to make sense of them. However, in drawing out the shapes she has the realisation that they are directions through the labyrinth. Reinvigorated, she sets out again through the tunnels, this time easily overcoming the various obstacles. When she reaches the acid pit she has the idea of using the acid to burn her bracelet off, and subsequently finds a series of symbols tattooed on her own wrist.

By following this new set of directions, Lisa finds her way to an organic, womb-like room, through the walls of which she can see the silhouettes of strange creatures moving around outside. She continues through further tunnels and again encounters the Adam-zombie, which she finally dispatches by crushing it in a compactor section of the tunnel.

Lisa finally finds her way to another tunnel section with daylight at the end, guarded by three chopping blades. She manages to get past two of them safely, but the third slices her foot off. Despite this injury she crawls on to the end of the tunnel, only to find the daylight was coming from a screen displaying a video of a sky.

As Lisa sobs in despair, the ceiling opens up and she begins to float upward into a bright light. She wakes up outside on a rock under a bright blue sky. Her foot is healed. Nina appears before her. Lisa asks if she is dead. Nina tells her that her body died many times (the corpses she encountered in the tunnels were those of her previous iterations) but that she is safe now. Lisa asks her what she is supposed to do. Nina says, "Live".

The camera pans up, revealing that they are on a beautiful alien planet.

== Cast ==
- Gaia Weiss as Lisa
- Peter Franzén as Adam

== Release ==
The film debuted at the Sitges Film Festival online on 11 October 2020. It was theatrically released first in France on 26 May 2021, and then in United states and on VOD on 9 July 2021 by Gravitas Ventures.

== Reception ==
=== Box office ===
Meander grossed a worldwide total of $698,361.

=== Critical response ===
Screen Daily compared the film to Cube and noted, "It's in the sound design that the horror really plays out most effectively". Other commentators also noted thematic similarities to Cube. "Hollywood Insider" praised the film writing, "A Tense Sci-Fi Horror Springs Up Like A Trap To Capture And Torture The Imagination". On review aggregator Rotten Tomatoes, the film holds an approval rating of 86% based on 14 reviews, with an average rating of 7.1/10.
