= Gaia Weiss =

French model and actress (born 1991)

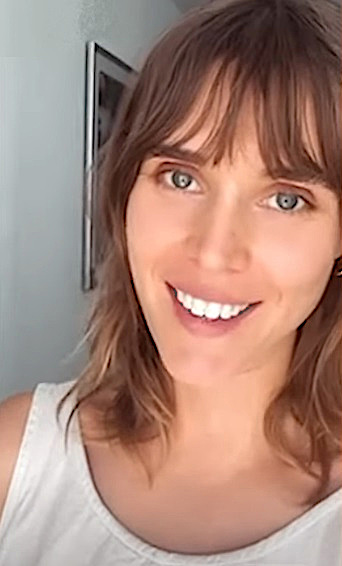
- Weiss at the German Comic Con 2024
- Born: 30 August 1991 (age 35); Paris, France
- Occupations: Actress, model
- Years active: 2012–present
- Modeling information
- Height: 180 cm (5 ft 11 in)
- Hair color: Dark blonde
- Eye color: Grey/green
- Agency: Eskimo Model Management (Paris); Just WM

Gaia Weiss (born 30 August 1991) is a French actress and model. Her filmography includes Mary Queen of Scots (2013), Vikings (2014–2015), Alien: Containment (2019), Meander (2020), La Révolution (2020), and Shepherd (2021).

== Early life ==
Weiss was born in Paris, France, to parents Catherine and Alain Weiss. She has a brother named Auriel Weiss. Weiss is Jewish on her father's side, and her paternal grandfather, Jean-Michel Weiss, from Alsace, was an engineer, a co-developer of a chromotherapy treatment, and a French Resistance member during WWII. The maternal side of her family is Polish. She spent her childhood between France, England, and Poland. She speaks French, English, Polish, Italian, German, and Hebrew.

At age three, Weiss began taking classical ballet lessons. She was inspired to act by the West End productions her great-uncle took her to see when she was living in London as a child, and started classes when she was seven. After finishing her baccalaureate, she attended the Cours Florent, and the London Academy of Music and Dramatic Art (LAMDA).

== Career ==
Weiss made her feature film debut in 2013 as Mary Fleming in Thomas Imbach's period drama Mary Queen of Scots and then played Béatrice Morel in the Italian drama White as Milk, Red as Blood. The following year, Weiss joined the recurring cast for the second and third seasons of the History series Vikings as Þorunn.

Weiss appeared in the mythology film The Legend of Hercules (2014), the French comedy Serial Teachers 2 (2015), the action film Overdrive (2017), Gérard Jugnot's Accidental Family (2017), and the short film Alien: Containment (2019). She also had a small role as Ippolita Sforza in the series Medici: Masters of Florence.

Weiss starred in the French horror film Meander and the British horror film Shepherd; the former earned her a number of genre accolades. She played Marianne in the Netflix alternative history series La Révolution. She provided the voice for Fulke in the video game Assassin's Creed Valhalla (2020). She appeared as Madame du Barry in the 2022 BBC and Canal+ series Marie Antoinette.

== Filmography ==
=== Film ===
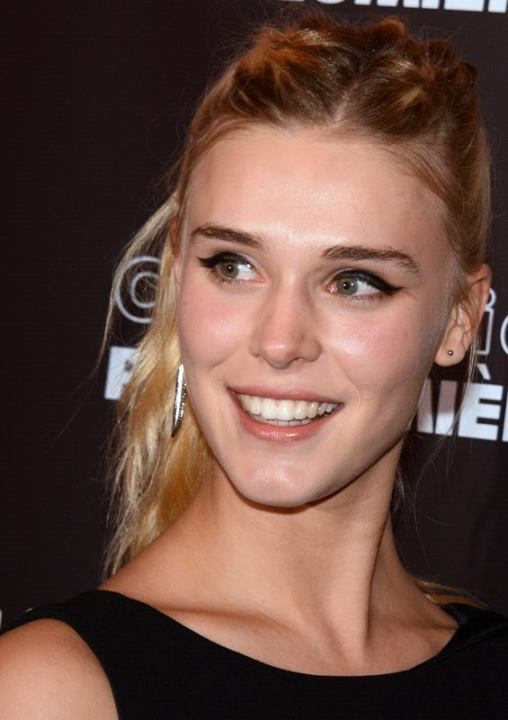
Weiss at the Lumière Awards 2014

| Year | Title | Role | Notes |
|---|---|---|---|
| 2013 | Mary Queen of Scots | Mary Fleming | |
| 2013 | White as Milk, Red as Blood (Italian: Bianca come il latte, rossa come il sangue) | Béatrice Morel | |
| 2014 | The Legend of Hercules | Hebe | |
| 2015 | Serial Teachers 2 | Vivienne Hamilton | |
| 2017 | Overdrive | Devin | |
| 2017 | Accidental Family (French: C'est beau la vie quand on y pense) | Hoellig | |
| 2019 | Judy | Abbie | |
| 2019 | Alien: Containment | Ward | Short film |
| 2020 | Meander (French: Méandre) | Lisa | |
| 2021 | Shepherd | Rachel Black | |
| 2022 | The Bunker Game | Laura | |

=== Television ===
| Year | Title | Role | Notes |
|---|---|---|---|
| 2014–2015 | Vikings | Þorunn | Recurring cast (seasons 2–3; 13 episodes) |
| 2016 | Outlander | Comtesse st. Germain | Episode: "La Dame Blanche" |
| 2018–2019 | Medici: Masters of Florence | Ippolita Sforza | 2 episodes |
| 2020 | La Révolution | Marianne | Main role |
| 2022 | Marie Antoinette | Madame du Barry | Main role |
| 2024 | The Gentlemen | Princesse Rosanne | 3 episodes |
| 2025 | Menace imminente | Karen Mets | 6 episodes |
| 2025 | My Family | Sara | 6 episodes |

=== Video games ===
| Year | Title | Role | Notes |
|---|---|---|---|
| 2020 | Assassin's Creed Valhalla | Fulke | Voice |

== Awards and nominations ==
| Year | Award | Category | Work | Result | Ref |
|---|---|---|---|---|---|
| 2015 | Golden Raspberry Awards | Worst Actress | The Legend of Hercules | Nominated | |
| 2020 | New York City Horror Film Festival | Best Actress | Meander | Won | |
| 2020 | Buenos Aires Rojo Sangre | Best Actress | Meander | Won | |
| 2020 | Nightmares Film Festival | Best Performance – Feature | Meander | Nominated | |
