= The Legend of Hercules =

- Theatrical release poster
- Directed by: Renny Harlin
- Written by: Sean Hood; Daniel Giat
- Produced by: Danny Lerner; Les Weldon; Boaz Davidson; Renny Harlin
- Starring: Kellan Lutz; Scott Adkins; Liam McIntyre; Liam Garrigan; Johnathon Schaech; Roxanne McKee; Gaia Weiss; Rade Šerbedžija
- Cinematography: Sam McCurdy
- Edited by: Vincent Tabaillon
- Music by: Tuomas Kantelinen
- Production company: Millennium Films
- Distributed by: Summit Entertainment (through Lionsgate)
- Release date: January 10, 2014 (United States)
- Running time: 99 minutes
- Country: United States
- Language: English
- Budget: $70 million
- Box office: $61.3 million

The Legend of Hercules is a 2014 American 3D action fantasy film directed by Renny Harlin, written by Daniel Giat and Sean Hood, and starring Kellan Lutz, Gaia Weiss, Scott Adkins, Roxanne McKee and Liam Garrigan. It was distributed by Lionsgate and released on January 10, 2014, six months before another Hercules film, Paramount Pictures' and MGM's co-production Hercules. The Legend of Hercules was a box-office bomb and received universally negative reviews from critics.

== Plot ==
In 1200 BC ancient Greece, King Amphitryon of Tiryns is conquering kingdoms in his thirst for more power, which disgusts his wife, Queen Alcmene. She prays to Hera for guidance and Hera's husband Zeus impregnates Alcmene with the savior of her people, a demigod son to be named Hercules. Amphitryon names his new "son" Alcides, though Alcmene secretly acknowledges his true name as Hercules. Twenty years later, Prince Alcides (Hercules) is the lover of Princess Hebe of Crete. Hercules and his older brother, Prince Iphicles, are attacked by a unusually strong lion, which Hercules strangles to death. Iphicles takes the credit at a royal banquet, but Hebe sees right through this lie. At the banquet Amphitryon announces the engagement of Hebe and Iphicles, while Hercules is sent away to a military campaign in Egypt. Alcmene tells him of his true lineage and that his name is Hercules, not Alcides.

Hercules joins the command of Captain Sotiris in the Egyptian desert; their small company faces an ambush by Amphitryon meant to eliminate Hercules, and only Alcides and Sotiris survive. Hercules uses his gods-given name to conceal his identity as the prince. The two are sold off as slaves to Lucius, a promoter of gladiator style fights, where they excel. Hercules defeats six previously-undefeated gladiators in an arena battle in Greece, which motivates members of Amphitryon's army to desert it and join Hercules and Sotiris, beginning a fight against Amphitryon's campaign of tyranny. Amphitryon is forced to hire foreign mercenaries as a result.

When Alcides does not return as promised, Alcmene and Hebe assume he is dead. When Alcmene seeks guidance from Hera, Amphitryon discovers her and learns the truth of Hercules' parentage and that he is fated to overthrow him. Amphitryon stabs Alcmene for her infidelity with her own dagger, which he hides as a suicide. Iphicles threatens Sotiris' son, forcing Sotiris to lead him to Hercules. Iphicles is surprised to discover that Hercules is Alcides. Hercules is chained and publicly flogged, then watches in horror as Iphicles murders Chiron, Alcmene's loyal adviser, under Amphitryon's orders. In anguish, he acknowledges Zeus as his father and calls upon him for strength. Hercules breaks free from his chains and kills Amphitryon's guard, though Amphitryon and Iphicles escape.

Hercules and Sotiris raise an army and storm Amphitryon's palace. Amphitryon's palace guard joins Hercules and his army, and they battle Amphitryon's mercenaries. Hercules calls upon his father, who infuses his sword with the power of lightning. Hercules defeats the mercenaries with his lightning sword, then meets Amphitryon in personal combat. Hercules nearly defeats Amphitryon but Iphicles holds Hebe hostage and threatens to kill her if Hercules does not let Amphitryon go. Hercules hesitates, but Hebe thrusts the dagger through her shoulder, killing Iphicles. Hercules finally avenges Alcmene's death and kills Amphitryon with the same blade that killed his mother. Hercules rushes to Hebe's side as she slowly drifts into unconsciousness. Nearly a year later, the cries of a baby are heard; Hercules' and Hebe's son. That night, he watches over his kingdom, finally fulfilling his destiny.

== Cast ==
- Kellan Lutz as Hercules (Alcides)
- Gaia Weiss as Hebe
- Scott Adkins as King Amphitryon
- Roxanne McKee as Queen Alcmene
- Liam Garrigan as Iphicles
- Liam McIntyre as Sotiris
- Rade Šerbedžija as Chiron
- Johnathon Schaech as Tarak
- Luke Newberry as Agamemnon
- Jukka Hildén as Creon
- Kenneth Cranham as Lucius
- Mariah Gale as Kakia
- Sarai Givaty as Saphirra
- Dimiter Doichinov as King Galenus
- Spencer Wilding as Humbaba
- Bashar Rahal as Commander
- Richard Reid as Archer

== Reception ==
=== Critical response ===
The Legend of Hercules received universally negative reviews from critics. On Rotten Tomatoes, the film has an approval rating of 5% based on 83 reviews, with an average rating of 2.70/10, based on 82 reviews. The site's consensus reads: "Cheap-looking, poorly acted, and dull, The Legend of Hercules is neither fun enough to qualify as an action movie nor absorbing enough to work on a dramatic level". On Metacritic, the film has a score of 22 out of 100, based on reviews from 19 critics, indicating "generally unfavorable reviews". Audiences polled by CinemaScore gave the film an average grade of "B−" on an A+ to F scale.

The Guardian's Mike McCahill gave the film 2/5 stars, writing that Renny Harlin "keeps it commendably brisk, and insists upon the primacy of flesh-and-blood performers duking it out on non-virtual sets, perhaps because his CGI is makeshift at best." Ignatiy Vishnevetsky of The A.V. Club gave it a D grade, writing, "While The Legend Of Hercules offers plenty for viewers who've acquired a taste for the fake and incompetent (not the least of which is the dialogue, which finds characters saying each other's names at the end of every other sentence), it's unlikely to please anyone who wants entertainment in the conventional sense." Chris Stuckmann gave the film a F grade, writing, "An obvious and blatant rip-off of 300 and Gladiator – much better movies – this film should be removed from theaters as soon as possible to avoid damaging the brains of people who have the misfortune of seeing it."

The Village Voice's Stephanie Zacharek wrote, "You could ask for more — an actual script, maybe? — but Harlin covers most of the basics. Or, perhaps more accurately, he leaves them uncovered." A. O. Scott of The New York Times said the film "delivers what it promises, which is muscular guys in skimpy clothes fighting and howling, as well as some large-scale digitally enhanced battle sequences."

Kellan Lutz adopted a British-style accent for his portrayal of Hercules, reflecting the convention of using British accents in historical settings, with one reviewer noting that he was required to "fake the classic British accent" despite the film's Greek setting.

=== Box office ===
The Legend of Hercules grossed $8,868,318 in its opening weekend, ranking #3 in the domestic box office behind Lone Survivor and Frozen. As of March 9, 2014, the film has grossed $18.8 million domestically and an additional $42.4 million internationally for a worldwide total of $61.3 million, failing to make back the budget of $70 million.

=== Accolades ===
Award	Date of ceremony	Category	Recipient(s)	Result	Ref.
Golden Raspberry Awards	February 21, 2015	Worst Picture		Nominated	
Golden Raspberry Awards	February 21, 2015	Worst Prequel, Remake, Rip-off or Sequel		Nominated	
Golden Raspberry Awards	February 21, 2015	Worst Actor	Kellan Lutz	Nominated	
Golden Raspberry Awards	February 21, 2015	Worst Actress	Gaia Weiss	Nominated	
Golden Raspberry Awards	February 21, 2015	Worst Director	Renny Harlin	Nominated	
Golden Raspberry Awards	February 21, 2015	Worst Screen Combo	Kellan Lutz	Nominated	
Teen Choice Awards	August 10, 2014	Choice Movie Actor: Action	Kellan Lutz	Nominated	
Young Hollywood Awards	July 28, 2014	Super Superhero	Kellan Lutz	Nominated	

== See also ==
- List of films featuring Hercules
