= La Révolution =

2020 French-language series

- Genre: Historical drama; Supernatural; Horror; Action; Dark fantasy
- Created by: Aurélien Molas
- Starring: Amir El Kacem; Marilou Aussilloux; Coline Béal; Doudou Masta; Lionel Erdogan; Julien Frison
- Music by: Saycet
- Country of origin: France
- Original language: French
- No. of seasons: 1
- No. of episodes: 8

Production
- Executive producer: Martin Jaubert
- Producers: François Lardenois; Aurélien Molas
- Running time: 39–57 minutes
- Production company: John Doe Production

Original release
- Network: Netflix
- Release: 16 October 2020

La Révolution is a 2020 French-language supernatural drama series produced by Netflix starring Doudou Masta, Julien Sarazin and Ian Turiak. In January 2021, the series was canceled after one season.

== Premise ==
1787. Amid the decadence of the Ancien Régime, Joseph Ignace Guillotin is responsible for investigating mysterious murders. He then discovers the existence of "blue blood". This unknown virus spreads within the aristocracy. The virus has devastating effects: the infected nobles attack the "little people", upsetting the social order. The revolt spreads and is the prelude to the French Revolution.

== Cast ==
- Amir El Kacem – Joseph Ignace Guillotin
- Marilou Aussilloux – Élise de Montargis
- Doudou Masta – Oka
- Amélia Lacquemant – Madeleine
- Lionel Erdogan – Albert Guillotin
- Julien Frison – Donatien de Montargis
- Coline Béal – Ophélie
- Isabel Aimé González-Sola – Katell
- Laurent Lucas – Charles de Montargis
- Dimitri Storoge – Edmond de Pérouse
- Gaia Weiss – Marianne
- Ian Turiak – Louis XVI
- Geoffrey Carlassare – Donatien's disciple

== Episodes ==
No.	Title	Directed by	Written by	Original release date
1	"The Beginning"	Julien Trousselier	Aurélien Molas & Gaïa Guast	16 October 2020
2	"The Revenant"	Julien Trousselier	Aurélien Molas & Gaïa Guast	16 October 2020
3	"The Innocents"	Jérémie Rozan	Aurélien Molas & Gaïa Guast	16 October 2020
4	"The Executioners"	Jérémie Rozan	Aurélien Molas & Gaïa Guast & Sabine Dabadie	16 October 2020
5	"The Blue Blood"	Jérémie Rozan	Aurélien Molas & Gaïa Guast	16 October 2020
6	"The Alliance"	Edouard Salier	Aurélien Molas & Gaïa Guast & Hamid Hlioua	16 October 2020
7	"The Dilemma"	Edouard Salier	Aurélien Molas & Gaïa Guast	16 October 2020
8	"The Rebellion"	Edouard Salier	Aurélien Molas & Gaïa Guast	16 October 2020

== Release ==
La Révolution was released on 16 October 2020 on Netflix.

== Production ==
=== Filming ===
Filming took place in Vexin en Val-d'Oise and Rambouillet en Yvelines, in May 2019, as well as the Plage de la Vieille Église in Barneville-Carteret in Manche, in September 2019.
