= Élisabeth de Miribel =

French writer and diplomat (1915–2005)

- Born: August 19, 1915; Commercy, Meuse, France
- Died: March 29, 2005 (aged 89)
- Burial place: Père Lachaise Cemetery, Paris
- Relatives: Patrice de Mac-Mahon (great-grandfather)

Élisabeth de Miribel (19 August 1915 – 29 March 2005) was a French writer, biographer, and diplomat.

== Biography ==
=== Origins ===
Born in Commercy, Élisabeth de Miribel was the great-granddaughter of Patrice de Mac-Mahon, the third President of France. She belonged to the Copin de Miribel family, which was rooted in Catholic tradition. She was personally involved in Christian social movements.

=== World War II: Secretary to General de Gaulle ===
Following the declaration of war in September 1939, de Miribel volunteered at the French Ministry of Foreign Affairs and was assigned to London to the "French Economic War Mission" led by writer and diplomat Paul Morand. In June 1940, during the Battle of France, she decided not to return to France after the signing of the Armistice of 22 June 1940.

On June 17, 1940, she was contacted by Geoffroy Chodron de Courcel, a childhood friend and aide-de-camp to Charles de Gaulle, who had just arrived in London. He asked her to carry out secretarial work. Her first task was to type the Appeal of 18 June 1940.

She remained in service with the Free French Forces as General de Gaulle's secretary.

On 19 June, General de Gaulle asked her to type a message addressed to General Charles Noguès, inviting him to join the Resistance with the assurance that he would serve under his command.

In 1942, she was sent on a mission to Quebec, tasked with gaining Canadian support for Free France and raising funds.

She later became a war correspondent in Italy, working with General Joseph de Goislard de Monsabert, and in Africa.

She met General Leclerc in May 1944 and expressed her desire to be assigned as a war correspondent within the 2nd Armored Division. Initially reluctant but impressed by her determination, he replied:

I don't want to be burdened with journalists, even less so with women. But let's make a deal: if you manage to join me in France, then I'll keep you.

On 13 August 1944, she took up the challenge set by the general by joining the 2nd Armored Division stationed in the gardens of the prefecture of Alençon, in the department of Orne. She then covered the Liberation of Paris for the press.

=== Post-war: nun and diplomat ===
Closely associated with Thomist circles, particularly those around Jacques Maritain, she entered the Carmelite Order in 1949. However, she left after five years due to health reasons.

In late 1954, Élisabeth de Miribel joined the French Ministry of Foreign Affairs as an attaché to Minister Pierre Mendès France's cabinet.

She was appointed to the embassy in Morocco as second secretary from 1957 to 1961. She then joined the central administration for Cultural and Technical Affairs in 1961–62, and worked in the archives and documentation department from 1962 to 1964. Subsequently, she joined the Americas Directorate at the time Charles de Gaulle was preparing diplomatic moves regarding Quebec. She served under Jean-Daniel Jurgensen in 1964–65 and was later appointed second secretary at the embassy in Santiago, Chile. She returned to the Americas Directorate just as De Gaulle was preparing his dramatic intervention in Quebec. She was later posted to Innsbruck, Austria at the Embassy of France in Austria, and ended her career as consul general of France in Florence, Italy.

== Awards and honours ==
She published an autobiography, La Liberté souffre violence, which won the Prix Saint-Simon in 1982, along with several biographies of historical figures.

== Death ==
She died in 2005 and was buried in Père Lachaise Cemetery (13th division) in Paris. She rests alongside her great-great-grandfather Armand Charles Augustin, Duke of La Croix de Castries (1756–1842), a lieutenant general, and her grandmother Élisabeth Charlotte Sophie de Mac Mahon, born de la Croix de Castries, Duchess of Magenta (1834–1900), wife of Marshal Mac Mahon.

== In popular culture ==
In the 2020 miniseries De Gaulle, l'éclat et le secret, her role was played by June Assal, and in the 2020 film De Gaulle she was portrayed by Marilou Aussilloux.

== Publications ==
- Prefaces by Henri-Irénée Marrou, Christian Chabanis, and Didier-Marie Golay, Like Gold Purified by Fire: Edith Stein (1891–1942), Éditions Plon, 1984, Éditions Perrin, 1998, Éditions du Cerf, 2012.
- Edith Stein, 1891–1942, preface by Henri-Irénée Marrou, Seuil, 1961.
- La liberté souffre violence. Paris: Plon. 1981. p. 259. ISBN 978-2-259-00831-0. OCLC 9094289.
- The Memory of Silences: Vladimir Ghika, preface by Maurice Schumann, Fayard, 1987.
- Giorgio La Pira, Desclée De Brouwer, 1992.
