= Frédéric Dubois d'Amiens =

French physician and historian of medicine

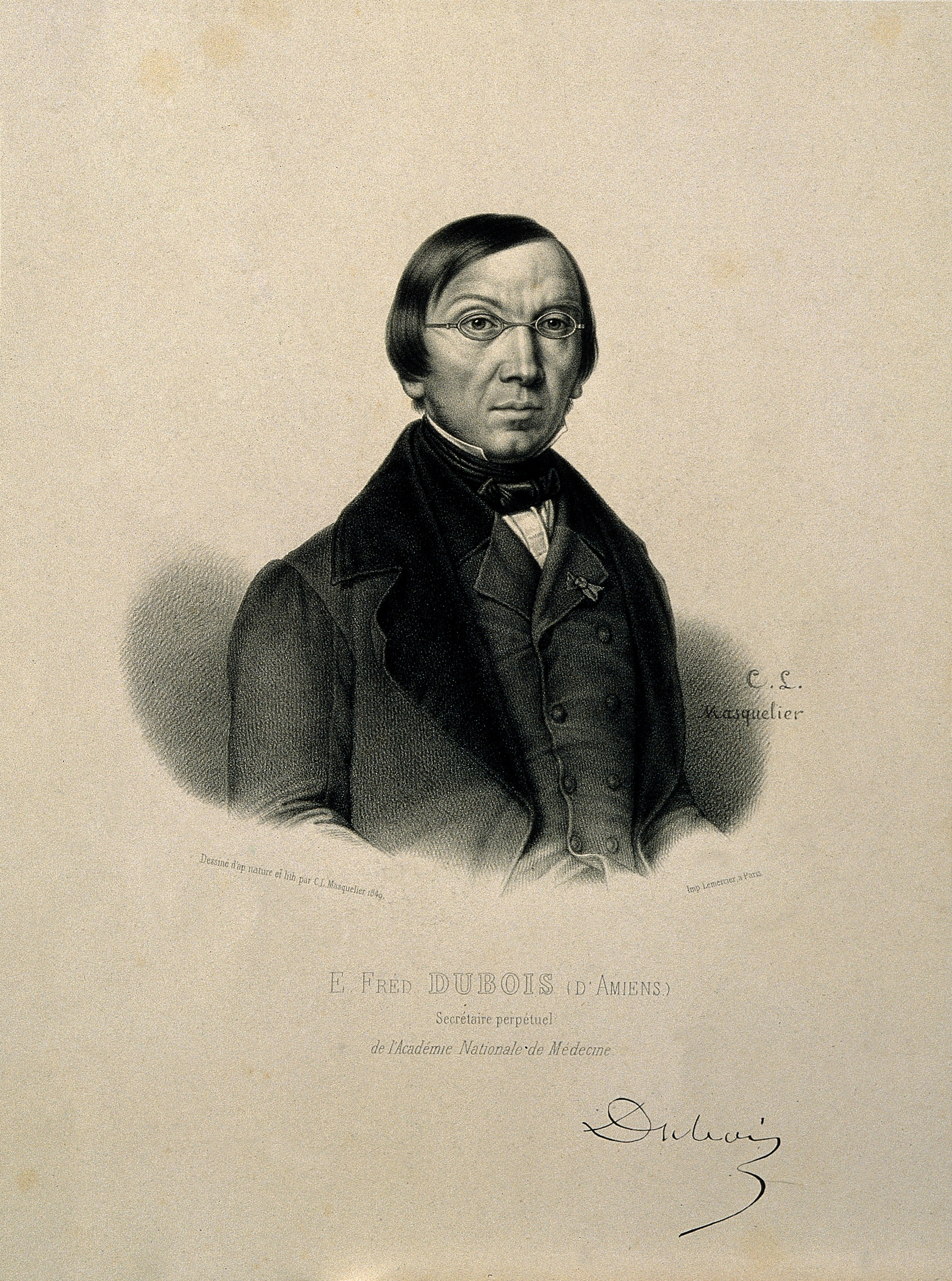
Frédéric Dubois d'Amiens, lithograph by Claude-Louis Masquelier (1849)

Frédéric Dubois d'Amiens (17 February 1799 in Amiens – 10 January 1873 in Paris) was a French medical doctor and historian of medicine.

He studied medicine in Amiens and Paris. In 1828 he received his medical doctorate and in 1832 obtained his agrégation. In 1847 he succeeded Étienne Pariset as perpetual secretary at the Académie Nationale de Médecine.

== Selected works ==
- Histoire philosophique de l'hypochondrie et de l'hystérie, 1833 – Philosophical history of hypochondria and hysteria.
- Examen historique et raisonné des expériences prétendues magnétiques, 1833 – Historical and reasoned examination of the alleged magnetic experiments.
- Traité de pathologie générale, 1835 – Treatise on general pathology.
- Traité des études médicales, ou de la manière d'étudier et d'enseigner la médecine, 1838 – Treatise on medical studies, or how to study and teach medicine.
- Histoire académique du magnétisme animal (with Claude Burdin, 1841) – Academic history of animal magnetism.
- Philosophie medicale. Examen des doctrines de Cabanis et de Gall, 1845 – Medical philosophy. Examination of the doctrines of Pierre Jean George Cabanis and Franz Joseph Gall.
- Éloges lus dans les séances publiques de l'Académie de médecine (1845-1863), 1864 – Eulogies read in public meetings of the Academy of Medicine (1845–1863).
- Recherches sur le genre de mort de J.J. Rousseau, 1866 – Research involving the death of Jean-Jacques Rousseau.

He wrote the eulogies of several French physicians and scientists; Mathieu Orfila, François Magendie, Louis Jacques Thénard, et al.
