= Passion (2012 film) =

2012 film

- French theatrical release poster
- Directed by: Brian De Palma
- Written by: Brian De Palma
- Based on: Love Crime by Alain Corneau
- Produced by: Saïd Ben Saïd
- Starring: Rachel McAdams; Noomi Rapace; Karoline Herfurth; Paul Anderson
- Cinematography: José Luis Alcaine
- Edited by: François Gédigier
- Music by: Pino Donaggio
- Production companies: SBS Productions; Integral Film; France 2 Cinéma; Canal+; France Télévisions; Ciné+; Medienboard Berlin-Brandenburg; Deutscher Filmförderfonds; Wild Bunch
- Distributed by: ARP Sélection (France); Ascot Elite Entertainment Group (Germany); Entertainment One (North America)
- Release dates: 7 September 2012 (Venice); 13 February 2013 (France); 2 May 2013 (Germany)
- Running time: 97 minutes
- Countries: France; Germany; United Kingdom
- Languages: English; German
- Budget: $25 million
- Box office: $1.3 million

Passion is a 2012 erotic thriller film written and directed by Brian De Palma, starring Rachel McAdams and Noomi Rapace. It is an English-language remake of Alain Corneau's 2010 thriller film Love Crime, but with the ending greatly altered. The film is an international co-production between France and Germany. The film was selected to compete for the Golden Lion at the 69th Venice International Film Festival.

== Plot ==
Christine Stanford, an American advertising executive in Germany, is working with her protégé Isabelle James on an ad campaign for a new smartphone. Isabelle, secretly having an affair with Christine's boyfriend Dirk Harriman, comes up with a well-received marketing idea. When Christine claims it as her own, Isabelle is disappointed but reconciles with her boss when Christine shares the story of how her twin sister died. At the urging of her loyal assistant Dani, Isabelle uploads a self-made version of her ad to the web, where it goes viral. Angered at the attention Isabelle has received, Christine vows revenge, taunting her with a sex tape which Isabelle had made with Dirk. After an angry Isabelle crashes her car in the company's parking garage, Christine shares the security footage with the rest of the company, humiliating Isabelle who spirals into a depression and begins abusing pills. Christine tries to get Dani fired and then threatens Isabelle with a letter she typed on Isabelle's computer vowing revenge.

After Christine is found dead, Isabelle is arrested and confesses to the murder while in a drug-induced stupor. Based on her confessions, the revenge note, and fibers matching a scarf which Isabelle was seen wearing, the police charge her with murder. However, they drop the charges when they discover someone who saw Isabelle at the ballet that night and when Dani discovers Isabelle's scarf, undamaged, in her apartment. The police learn that Dirk, who was in the neighbourhood at the time of the murder, had been embezzling money and Christine discovered this. When they find a bloody scarf in his car they arrest him.

Eventually, it is revealed that Isabelle had murdered Christine and set everything up to convince everyone that she was having a nervous breakdown while framing Dirk for the crime. Dani, who is secretly in love with Isabelle, reveals that she had captured Isabelle on video at various moments during the night of the murder. Dani then tries to blackmail Isabelle into becoming her lover. That night, Isabelle has a strange dream where she strangles Dani after being seduced by her, but not before Dani sends the video incriminating Isabelle to the investigating detective. Suddenly, Christine's twin sister appears and strangles Isabelle from behind with a bloodstained scarf. The next moment, Isabelle wakes up in her own bedroom from her nightmare only to face a new one with Dani lying dead at the foot of her bed.

== Cast ==
- Rachel McAdams as Christine Stanford
- Noomi Rapace as Isabelle James
- Karoline Herfurth as Dani
- Paul Anderson as Dirk Harriman
- Rainer Bock as Inspector Bach
- Benjamin Sadler as Prosecutor
- Dominic Raacke as J.J. Koch
- Michael Rotschopf as Inspector Isabelle
- Max Urlacher as Jack

== Production ==
Noomi Rapace was cast as Isabelle James after Brian De Palma ran into a director in New York who was interested in having Rapace in his film. The director gave De Palma some of Rapace's Swedish films, and De Palma was impressed by Rapace's performances. He saw Rachel McAdams' performance in Mean Girls and decided to cast her as Christine Stanford. For the film, De Palma had initially written a sequence inspired by Inception (2010), saying "I had this incredibly complicated commercial based on Inception with three dreams on top of each other, they finally get to the vault and there's the phone. It was elaborate and some of my director friends looked at this and said, 'Come on! Get rid of that Inception thing. Do something else...I said, 'I love this Inception thing.'" De Palma ended up discarding the idea.

The film was shot in Berlin. Notable landmarks included the DZ Bank Building. De Palma used 35mm film to shoot the film.

== Release ==
Passion screened in competition at the 69th Venice International Film Festival in September 2012. Metrodome, the film's UK distributor, sent the film straight to DVD and video on demand, stating that: "Brian De Palma has an in-built fan base, but a genre like this can be difficult to release theatrically. It's a turbulent theatrical market and we felt this was the best way to launch the film to UK audiences."

== Reception ==
On review aggregator website Rotten Tomatoes, the film has an approval rating of 33% based on 76 reviews and an average rating of 5.5/10. The website's critical consensus reads, "For better as well as worse, Passion is vintage Brian De Palma sexploitation — although with a storyline sillier than most, it fails to generate as much heat as his steamiest work." Metacritic calculates a weighted average score of 53 out of 100 based on the opinions of 22 critics, signifying "mixed or average reviews".

Robert Bell of Exclaim! rated the film 8 out of 10, writing: "It's just unfortunate that those unfamiliar with the director's work will have absolutely no context for the abstract and oblique tonal shifts or the references, leaving them to dismiss the film as terrible." Eric Kohn of IndieWire gave the film a "B" grade and Alan Pyke of Tiny Mix Tapes gave the film 2.5 out of 5 stars. Peter Sobczynski of RogerEbert.com gave the film a four-star rating, calling it "a spellbinding thriller", and DePalma "one of the great seducers of cinema".

Neil Young of The Hollywood Reporter reviewed the film negatively, commenting that "the impression is that De Palma is indulging himself with homages to his own Hitchcockian greatest hits, with results that veer close to self-parody on occasion and emphasize just how far this once-outstanding director's creative star has plummeted." Robert Abele of the Los Angeles Times called the film a "sleekly trashy misfire". Ed Gonzalez of Slant Magazine gave the film 3 out of 4 stars. Bruce DeMara of Toronto Star gave the film 1.5 out of 4 stars, describing the film as "a pale imitation of the auteur's best work".

Brian Clark of Twitch Film published a mixed review, while Ben Sachs of Chicago Reader wrote a favorable review, noting that De Palma interweaves themes such as corporate power, advertising, sexual desire, sadomasochistic relationships, and longing for love with a musicality comparable to his visual style. Calum Marsh of Esquire writes: "What makes Passion such a distinctively modern take on the now-antiquated erotic thriller is that it has a keen sense of humor about itself".

== Box office ==
Released in fourteen theatres, Passion was positioned in 54th place at the box office during the weekend of its release, with a corresponding total revenue of US$33,400—after four weeks, the film's total takings were US$92,181. As of 26 September 2013, Passion garnered a total of US$1,301,226 in ticket receipts outside of the US, while the cumulative global box office revenue for the film was US$1,393,407.
