= Michel Bouquet =

French actor (1925–2022)

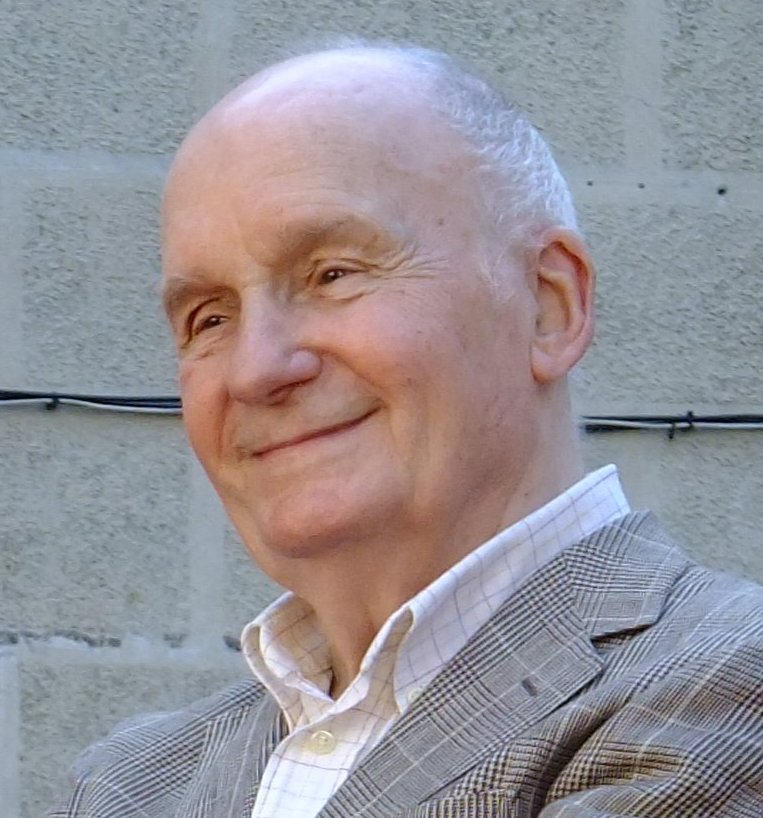
- Bouquet in 2010
- Born: 6 November 1925; Paris, France
- Died: 13 April 2022 (aged 96); Paris, France
- Education: CNSAD
- Occupation: Actor
- Years active: 1944–2021
- Spouses: Ariane Borg (m. 1954; div. 1967) Juliette Carré (m. 1970)

Michel François Pierre Bouquet (6 November 1925 – 13 April 2022) was a French stage and film actor. He appeared in more than 100 films from 1947 to 2020. He won the Best Actor European Film Award for Toto the Hero in 1991 and two Best Actor Césars for How I Killed My Father (2001) and The Last Mitterrand (2005). He also received the Molière Award for Best Actor for Les côtelettes in 1998, then again for Exit the King in 2005. In 2014, he was awarded the Honorary Molière for the sum of his career. He received the Grand Cross of the Legion of Honor in 2018.

== Biography ==
Michel François Pierre Bouquet was born on 6 November 1925 in Paris. When he was seven years old, he was sent to a boarding school where he stayed until the age of 14. He aspired to become a doctor but had to quit school at the age of 15 after his father had been taken prisoner during World War II. Bouquet worked as a baker's apprentice, then a bank clerk, to provide for the family. After a short stay in Lyon, he returned with his mother to Paris. Marie Bouquet was passionate about theater, and that helped the young Bouquet to find his vocation. He took acting classes under the tutelage of Maurice Escande, a member of the Comédie Française, and made his stage debut in the play La première étape in 1944. Then he studied at the Conservatory of Dramatic Arts in Paris where he met Gérard Philippe.

=== Stage career ===
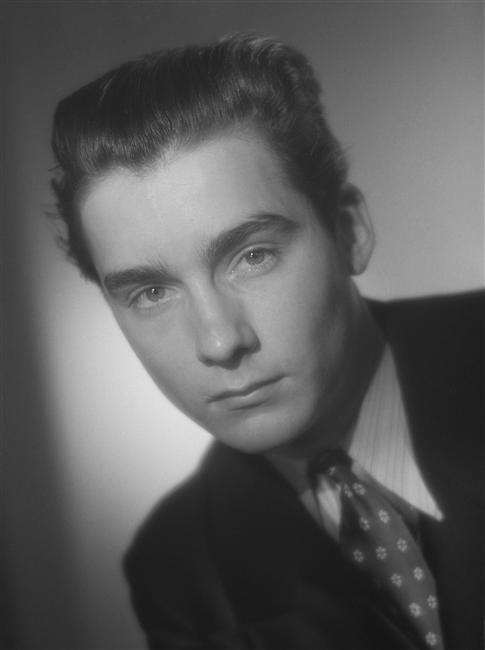
Bouquet in a 1943 publicity photo

In the mid-1940s Michel Bouquet began working with the playwright Jean Anouilh and director André Barsacq, who staged plays at the Théâtre de l'Atelier in Montmartre. In 1946, Anouilh gave Bouquet a part in Roméo and Jeannette, followed by The Rendez-vous of Senlis and The Invitation to the Castle in 1947. In the 1950s, the actor met another stage director, Jean Vilar, with whom he would frequently collaborate. Bouquet played many roles from the classical repertoire at the Festival d'Avignon, created by Vilar in 1947 (Henry IV in 1950, The Tragedy of King Richard II in 1953, and The Miser in 1962). Bouquet regularly worked with Anouilh until the early 1970s, then helped popularize in France the works of the British author Harold Pinter: The Collection in 1965, The Birthday Party in 1967 and No Man's Land in 1979.

At the same time, at the end of the 1970s, Michel Bouquet was appointed professor at the National Conservatory of Dramatic Arts and taught there until 1990. In the 1980s-1990s, he returned to the Théâtre de l'Atelier where he once began his career. In 1994, he played in Exit the King by Eugène Ionesco, the role he would perform many times until 2014. In 1998 he received the Molière Award for Best Actor for Bertrand Blier's Les côtelettes, then again for Exit the King in 2005. In 2014, he was awarded the Honorary Molière for the sum of his career. A year later, the actor received accolades for his performance in Taking Sides by the British playwright Ronald Harwood. Bouquet announced his retirement from stage in 2019.

=== Film career ===
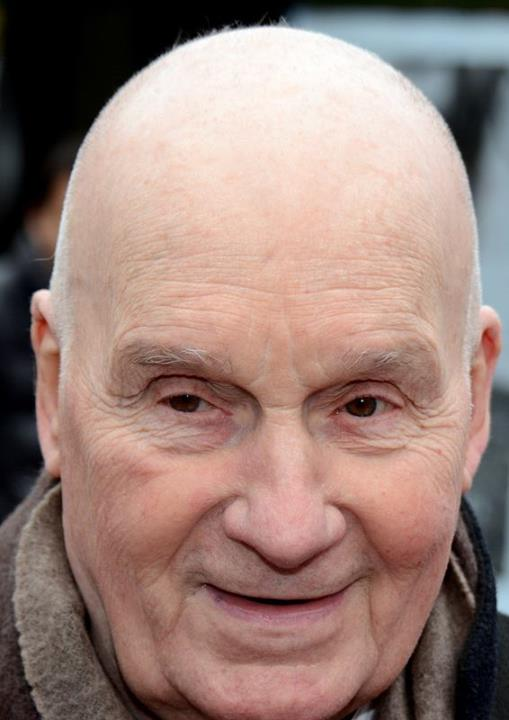
Bouquet in 2014

Though Bouquet made his screen debut in 1947, his film career was slower to develop. In 1949, he appeared in Pattes blanches, adapted by Jean Anouilh from his own play and directed by Jean Grémillon, then in Henri-Georges Clouzot's Manon (1950) and Anouilh's Deux sous de violettes (1951). Three years later, he acted in Abel Gance's historical melodrama La Tour de Nesle. In 1955, he narrated Alain Resnais' documentary Night and Fog. In 1965, he worked for the first time with director Claude Chabrol in Our Agent Tiger. Bouquet went on to act in several Chabrol films and received wide acclaim for his performances in The Unfaithful Wife, The Breach, and Just Before Nightfall.

With François Truffaut he shoots as Comolli, the private detective murdered by Jean-Paul Belmondo in Mississippi Mermaid (1969) and as one of the victims of Jeanne Moreau in The Bride Wore Black. For Chabrol he played the husband deceived by Stéphane Audran in The Unfaithful Wife, followed by Audran's wicked father-in-law in The Breach. Bouquet and Audran worked together in four Chabrol films. In the 1970s Bouquet is the obstinate cop who terrorized Alain Delon in Deux hommes dans la ville (1972), candidate for legislative elections in Defense de savoir (1973) by Nadine Trintignant, the hospitalized press boss who is surrounded by Claude Jade in Les Anneaux de Bicêtre (1976), but in the same year he was also the formidable billionaire in the comedy Le Jouet by Francis Veber. In this decade he played two dark roles for André Cayatte, in Il n'y a pas de fumée sans feu and La Raison d'État. Another film on the political subject is Plot by Yves Boisset. In the 1980s, he embodied a rotten notary and Stéphane Audran's enemy in Cop au Vin (1986), still with Chabrol. In 1982 he took on the role of Javert in Robert Hossein's adaptation of Les Miserables with Lino Ventura as Jean Valjean and Jean Carmet as Thénardier in 1984, and with such talent that many Hugolians consider this interpretation as the embodiment even by Javert.

=== Other works ===
Over the years, Bouquet recorded his readings of the works of Cervantes, Victor Hugo, Jean-Paul Sartre and other authors that were released on discs. An audio book of his readings of 13 selected fables of Jean de La Fontaine was released in 2019 to wide critical acclaim.

=== Personal life ===
Bouquet was married twice. His first wife was actress Ariane Borg, whom he divorced in 1967. His second wife Juliette Carré was also an actress, who often shared the stage with him.

Bouquet died in Paris on 13 April 2022, at the age of 96.

== Selected filmography ==
Year	Title	Role	Director
1947	Criminal Brigade	Le tueur	Gilbert Gil
1947	Monsieur Vincent	The TB sufferer	Maurice Cloche
1948	Manon	The helmsman	Henri-Georges Clouzot
1949	White Paws	Maurice	Jean Grémillon
1951	Three Women (episode L'Héritage)	M. Lesable	André Michel
1955	Night and Fog	narrator	Alain Resnais
1964	Les Amitiés particulières	Father Trennes	Jean Delannoy
1965	Our Agent Tiger	Jacques Vermorel	Claude Chabrol
1967	The Bride Wore Black	Coral	François Truffaut
1967	Lamiel	Doctor Sansfin	Jean Aurel
1967	The Road to Corinth	Sharps	Claude Chabrol
1968	Mississippi Mermaid	Mr Comolli	François Truffaut
1968	The Unfaithful Wife	Charles Desvalles	Claude Chabrol
1969	Last Leap	Jauran	Édouard Luntz
1970	Borsalino	Maître Rinaldi	Jacques Deray
1970	Just Before Nightfall	Charles Masson	Claude Chabrol
1970	The Breach	Ludovic Régnier	Claude Chabrol
1970	The Cop	L'inspecteur Favenin	Yves Boisset
1970	Comptes à rebours	Valberg	Roger Pigaut
1971	Malpertuis	Dideloo	Harry Kümel
1972	Night Flight from Moscow	Tavel	Henri Verneuil
1972	Trois milliards sans ascenseur	Albert	Roger Pigaut
1972	Plot	Maïtre Lempereur	Yves Boisset
1972	Il n'y a pas de fumée sans feu	M. Morlaix	André Cayatte
1973	Deux hommes dans la ville	Inspector Goitreau	José Giovanni
1973	Le Complot	Lelong	René Gainville
1974	La Main à couper	Georges Noblet	Étienne Périer
1975	Au-delà de la peur	Claude Balard	Yannick Andréi
1976	The Toy	Président Rambal-Cochet	Francis Veber
1977	Les Anneaux de Bicêtre	René Maugras	Louis Grospierre
1978	La Raison d'État	Francis Jobin	André Cayatte
1978	L'Ordre et la sécurité du monde	Banquier Muller	Claude d'Anna
1982	Les Misérables	L'inspecteur Javert	Robert Hossein
1984	Cop au Vin	Hubert Lavoisier	Claude Chabrol
1985	Le regard dans le miroir	Mathias	Jean Chapot
1990	Toto the Hero	Thomas (at old age)	Jaco Van Dormael
1991	Tous les Matins du Monde	Baugin	Alain Corneau
1993	The Eye of Vichy	narrator	Claude Chabrol
1994	Élisa	Samuel	Jean Becker
1997	Milice, film noir	narrator	Alain Ferrari
2001	How I Killed My Father	Maurice	Anne Fontaine
2001	Leïla	narrator	Gabriel Axel
2003	Les Côtelettes	Mr Potier	Bertrand Blier
2004	The Last Mitterrand	President Mitterrand	Robert Guédiguian
2010	The Little Room	Edmond	Stéphanie Chuat and Véronique Reymond
2012	Renoir	Pierre-Auguste Renoir	Gilles Bourdos
2015	The Art Dealer	Raoul	François Margolin
2016	The Origin of Violence	Marcel Fabre in 2014	Élie Chouraqui
2018	Lucia's Grace		Gianni Zanasi
2020	Villa Caprice	Marcel Germon	Bernard Stora

== Awards and nominations ==
=== César Awards ===
Year	Group	Award	Film	Result
2002	César Awards	Best Actor	How I Killed My Father (Comment j'ai tué mon père)	Won
2006	César Awards	Best Actor	The Last Mitterrand (Le Promeneur du Champs-de-Mars)	Won
2014	César Awards	Best Actor	Renoir	Nominated

=== European Film Award ===
Year	Group	Award	Film	Result
1991	European Film Awards	Best Actor	Toto le Héros	Won

=== Globes de Cristal Award ===
Year	Group	Award	Film	Result
2006	Globes de Cristal Award	Best Actor	The Last Mitterrand	Nominated

=== Molière Awards ===
Year	Group	Award	Play	Result
1998	Molière Awards	Best Actor	Les Côtelettes	Won
2005	Molière Awards	Best Actor	Le Roi se meurt	Won
2014	Molière Awards	Honorary	For his career	Won

Year	Group	Award	Play	Result
1987	Molière Awards	Best Actor	Le Malade imaginaire	Nominated
1988	Molière Awards	Best Actor	Le Malade imaginaire	Nominated
2000	Molière Awards	Best Actor	Taking Sides	Nominated
2007	Molière Awards	Best Actor	The Miser	Nominated

== Decorations ==
Bouquet was made Knight of the Legion of Honor in 1983, promoted to Officer in 1996, Commander in 2007, Grand Officer in 2013, and was awarded the Grand Cross of the Legion of Honor on 13 July 2018.
