= Hitchcockian =

Films made which are similar in style to Alfred Hitchcock's films

Hitchcockian films are those made by various filmmakers, with the styles and themes similar to those of Alfred Hitchcock.

== Characteristics ==
Elements frequently included in Hitchcock's films which lead to Hitchcockian comparisons include:

- Climactic plot twist.
- The cool platinum blonde.
- The presence of a domineering mother in someone's life.
- An innocent person accused (e.g. The Lodger: A Story of the London Fog, Blackmail, Murder!/Mary, Young and Innocent, The 39 Steps)
- Restricting the action to a single setting to increase tension (e.g. Lifeboat, Rope, Rear Window).
- Characters who switch sides and/or who cannot be trusted.
- Tension building through suspense to the point where the audience enjoys seeing the character in a life-threatening situation (e.g. Vertigo).
- Average people thrust into strange or dangerous situations (e.g., Psycho, North by Northwest, The Man Who Knew Too Much, Secret Agent).
- Bumbling or incompetent authority figures, particularly police officers.
- Use of darkness to symbolize impending doom (dark clothing, shadows, smoke, etc.; e.g. Rope)
- Strong visual use of famous landmarks (Statue of Liberty, Mount Rushmore, Forth Rail Bridge, Golden Gate Bridge, Albert Hall, British Museum, Piccadilly Circus, etc.)
- Mistaken identity (e.g. North by Northwest, Frenzy).
- The use of a staircase as a motif for impending danger or suspense. (e.g. The Man Who Knew Too Much, Number Seventeen)
- Use of a MacGuffin plot device.
- Referring to crime for mystery rather than presenting it explicitly (e.g. Dial M for Murder).
- Train scenes (e.g. North by Northwest, The Lady Vanishes, Strangers on a Train, Shadow of a Doubt, The 39 Steps).
- Bus scenes (e.g. Sabotage, To Catch a Thief, The Man Who Knew Too Much)
- Belfry/bell tower sequences (e.g. The Man Who Knew Too Much, Vertigo, Secret Agent)
- Rooftop-borne demises, especially from very tall buildings (e.g. To Catch a Thief, The Man Who Knew Too Much, Blackmail, Jamaica Inn)
- The color red provoking a fearful, and potentially self-destructive, reaction. (e.g. Rear Window, The Fourth Man (1983 film), Marnie)
- A beautiful woman needlessly embezzling her employer's money
- Voyeurism and surveillance.

== Notable examples ==
Some films, or films with scenes, considered Hitchcockian include:

- Gaslight (1944)
- Sorry, Wrong Number (1948)
- Niagara (1953)
- 23 Paces to Baker Street (1956)
- Witness for the Prosecution (1957)
- Chase a Crooked Shadow (1957)
- Midnight Lace (1960)
- Peeping Tom (1960)
- Cape Fear (1962)
- Charade (1963)
- From Russia with Love (1963)
- The Prize (1963)
- Topkapi (1964)
- Mirage (1965)
- Arabesque (1966)
- Blowup (1966)
- Wait Until Dark (1967)
- Duel (1971)
- Play Misty for Me (1971)
- Sisters (1972)
- The Last of Sheila (1973)
- Phantom of the Paradise (1974)
- Jaws (1975)
- Obsession (1976)
- Halloween (1978)
- Last Embrace (1979)
- Dressed to Kill (1980)
- Maniac (1980)
- Blow Out (1981)
- Body Double (1984)
- Cloak & Dagger (1984)
- Blue Velvet (1986)
- Fatal Attraction (1987)
- Frantic (1988)
- Arachnophobia (1990)
- Misery (1990)
- Cape Fear (1991)
- Basic Instinct (1992)
- Shallow Grave (1994)
- 12 Monkeys (1995)
- Bound (1996)
- The Cable Guy (1996)
- Double Jeopardy (1999)
- What Lies Beneath (2000)
- Mulholland Drive (2001)
- Panic Room (2002)
- Femme Fatale (2002)
- Phone Booth (2002)
- Disturbia (2007)
- Bad Education (2004)
- Funny Games (2007)
- Passion (2012)
- Side Effects (2013)
- Stoker (2013)
- Not Safe for Work (2014)
- Crimson Peak (2015)
- The Gift (2015)
- Don't Breathe (2016)
- Nocturnal Animals (2016)
- A Kind of Murder (2016)
- Split (2016)
- Thoroughbreds (2017)
- Gerald's Game (2017)
- A Simple Favor (2018)
- The Invisible Man (2020)
- Eileen (2023)
- Drop (2025)

=== Filmmakers ===
The following is a list of filmmakers who have directed multiple Hitchcockian films:

- Dario Argento
- Park Chan-wook
- Henri-Georges Clouzot
- Brian De Palma

== Films by country ==
=== Australia ===
- Roadgames (1981)
- Crosstalk (1982)
- Coffin Rock (2009)
- Blame (2010)
- Crawl (2011)
- Bad Blood (2017)

=== France ===
- Les Diaboliques (1955)
- Plein Soleil (1960)
- The Bride Wore Black (1968)
- La Piscine (1969)
- Mississippi Mermaid (1969)
- Le Boucher (1970)
- The Vanishing (1988)
- Love Crime (2010)
- Elle (2016)
- Personal Shopper (2016)
- L'Amant double (2017)

=== Germany ===
- Unknown (2011)

=== India ===
- Andhadhun (2018)
- Sookshmadarshini (2024)

=== Italy ===
- The Bird with the Crystal Plumage (1970)
- Terror (1978)
- Tenebrae (1982)

=== Netherlands ===
- The Fourth Man (1983 film)
- The Vanishing (1988)

=== South Korea ===
- Mother (2009)
- The Handmaiden (2016)
- Decision to Leave (2022)

=== Spain ===
- Buried (2010)

== See also ==
- Alfred Hitchcock
- Alfred Hitchcock filmography
- Giallo
- Krimi
- Thriller film
