= Gérald Laroche =

French actor (born 1964)

Gérald Laroche (born 1964) is a French actor born in Paris, France. He is an actor and composer known for his roles in Maléfique (2002), The Last Deadly Mission (2008) and Love Crime (2010).

== Filmography ==
Year	Title	Role	Director	Notes
1989	Hiver 54, l'abbé Pierre	Clovis	Denis Amar	
1990	Faux et Usage de Faux	l'assistant	Laurent Heynemann	
1993	La Nage indienne	Max	Xavier Durringer	
1995	Au petit Marguery	Paul	Laurent Bénégui	
1997	Romaine	Armand	Agnès Obadia	
1997	J'irai au paradis car l'enfer est ici	Rufin	Xavier Durringer	
2001	Trois huit	Pierre	Philippe Le Guay	
2001	J'ai tué Clémence Acéra	Paul Alimi	Jean-Luc Gaget	
2002	Gangsters	Marc Jansen	Olivier Marchal	
2003	Maléfique	Carrère	Éric Valette	
2003	Fanfan la Tulipe	Corsini	Gérard Krawczyk	
2003	Qui perd gagne!	l'employé du casino	Laurent Bénégui	
2004	Nelly	René	Laure Duthilleul	
2005	The Black Box	Koskas	Richard Berry	
2005	Michou d'Auber	Robert	Thomas Gilou	
2006	La Jungle	le psychiatre	Mathieu Delaporte	
2006	The Serpent	Becker	Éric Barbier	
2007	Le Dernier Voyage	Rivière	Frédéric Duvin	Short film
2007	The Second Wind	Chef	Alain Corneau	
2007	The Last Deadly Mission	Georges Matéo	Olivier Marchal	
2007	Nos retrouvailles	Krosiki	David Oelhoffen	
2007	I Always Wanted to Be a Gangster	le patron	Samuel Benchetrit	
2008	Les insoumis	Abel Vargas	Claude-Michel Rome	
2008	Dante 01	Charon	Marc Caro	
2009	Tomorrow at Dawn	Rogart	Denis Dercourt	
2009	Une affaire d'État	Christophe Bonfils	Éric Valette	
2010	Love Crime	Gérard	Alain Corneau	
2012	Paris by Night	Alex	Philippe Lefebvre	
2015	Blind Date	Jury 1	Clovis Cornillac	
2017	Le Serpent aux mille coupures	Adrien Viguie	Éric Valette	
2022	L'école est à nous	M. Castelli	Alexandre Castagnetti	
