= Juliette Carré =

French actress (1933–2023)

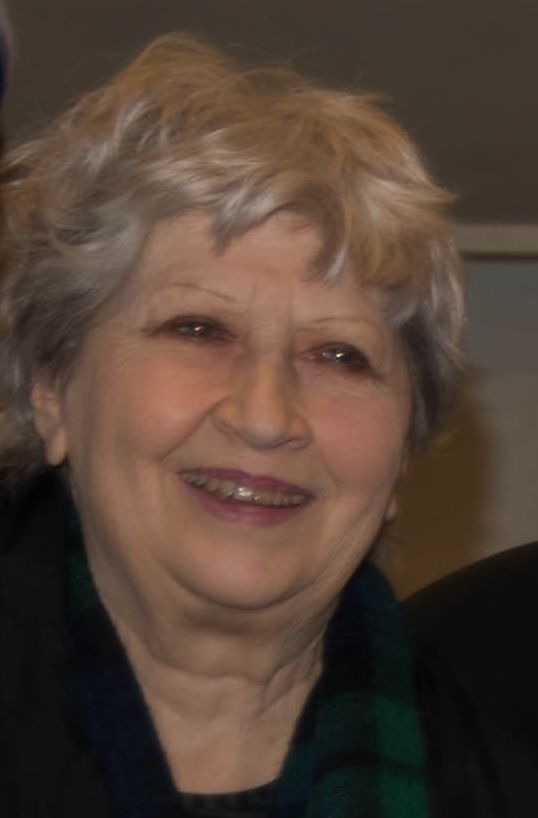
- Juliette Carré in 2014
- Born: 22 November 1933; Étais-la-Sauvin, Yonne, France
- Died: 25 December 2023 (aged 90); Étais-la-Sauvin, Yonne, France
- Occupation: Actress
- Spouse: Michel Bouquet (m. 1970; died 2022)

Juliette Carré (22 November 1933 – 25 December 2023) was a French actress. She was married to Michel Bouquet whom she starred alongside. Carré died on 25 December 2023, in her hometown, Étais-la-Sauvin, at the age of 90.
