= Jean-Claude Bourbault =

French actor (1944 or 1945 – 2024)

- Born: 1944 or 1945
- Died: 1 October 2024 (aged 79)
- Occupation: Actor

Jean-Claude Bourbault (1944 or 1945 – 1 October 2024) was a French actor. He joined the Théâtre du Soleil in 1972. Bourbault died on 1 October 2024, at the age of 79.

== Filmography ==
=== Cinema ===
- Les Uns et les Autres (1981)
- Édith et Marcel (1983)
- La Palombière (1983)
- À nous les garçons (1985)
- Attention bandits! (1987)
- La Maison assassinée (1988)
- Delphine 1, Yvan 0 (1996)
- Sachs' Disease (1999)
- The Last Mitterrand (2005)
- Paris Lockdown (2007)
- The Army of Crime (2009)

=== Television ===
- La bavure (1984)
- Interdit d'amour (1992)

== Theatre ==
- Oh ! America ! (1970)
- Un songe pour une nuit d'été (1971)
- Une nuit pour Vaclav Havel (1982)
- Minuit chrétien (1999)
- The Baker's Wife (2010)
