= Maléfique =

- Directed by: Éric Valette
- Written by: Franck Magnier; Alexandre Charlot
- Produced by: Marc Missonnier; Olivier Delbosc
- Starring: Gérald Laroche; Philippe Laudenbach
- Cinematography: Jean-Marc Bouzou
- Edited by: Luc Golfin
- Music by: Éric Sampieri
- Distributed by: Mars Distribution
- Release dates: 9 November 2002 (San Sebastian Horror and Fantasy Film Festival)
- Running time: 90 minutes
- Country: France
- Language: French

Maléfique is a 2002 French horror film directed by Éric Valette.

== Plot ==
Carrere, a middle-class family man convicted of financial fraud, arrives in prison where he finds himself sharing a cell with three others- Lassalle, an old librarian who murdered his wife; Paquerette, a childlike lunatic who ate his infant sister and Marcus, a muscular young transgender woman (whose crime is not mentioned) who yearns for a sex-change.

The cellmates discover, hidden behind a loose brick of the cell-wall, an old hand-written journal which belonged to a prisoner named Danvers in the 1920s who mysteriously disappeared from his cell. The book is filled with incantations and symbols of black magic. Although sceptical, Carrere reads aloud one of the incantations and the prisoners are shocked when a bright, burning symbol briefly materialises on the floor. Carrere, and then Lassalle both study the book and they begin to have disturbing visions. Paquerette wakes up one morning to find that during the night, his fingers have vanished.

The cellmates argue over what to do with the book. Paquerette grabs the book and starts to eat its pages only to be over-powered by an unseen force which twists his entire body until his spine and neck snap. The other three prisoners are blamed by the guards for Paquerette's death, condemning them to stay in prison for life. Lasselle believes that the book was defending itself. A new prisoner named Picus arrives, a friendly, eccentric man who always carries a video camera. Later, the others wake up one morning to find that Picus has disappeared, leaving his camera and the journal on the floor. They watch the last piece of footage on the camera in which Picus reads an incantation from the book whereupon a brightly lit doorway appears on the wall through which he walks. They ask the guards about Picus but the latter reply that they do not know who the cellmates are talking about, revealing that Picus was a hallucination concocted by the book, designed to reveal the book's true powers.

Carrere has been abandoned by his wife and he will never see his beloved son again, the only relic of whom he possesses is an action-figure doll that belonged to his son. Carrere now sees the book as his only chance to escape. The three prisoners read aloud the same incantation that Picus read and the brightly illuminated door-way again appears in the cell wall, through which they walk. They find themselves in a dirty, much older prison cell and the book does not offer a means of escape. They realise that they have entered Danvers’ cell as it was in the 1920s. Carrere and Marcus become angry but Lassalle remains calm and without warning kills Marcus with a sharpened rock. Carrere is furious but Lassalle explains that he finally understands the nature of the book's powers- it was not intended to let them physically escape but to enable them all to realise their deepest desires albeit at a terrible price. A flashback sequence reveals the true fate of the cell's original inhabitant Danvers. Obsessed with youth, Danvers uttered his final spell and the book transformed him into a young man but the reverse ageing did not stop until he was reduced to an unborn infant, dissolving into nothingness. Lassalle says that Marcus' desire to become a woman was not strong enough and she could only be set free through death. Lassalle, who has always been obsessed with, and terrified of, the powers of the written word, grips the book and merges with it, its powers crushing the life out of him. Now the only survivor, Carrere states aloud his dearest wish- to see his son again- and his mouth opens in a silent scream as his eyes vanish.

The final scenes occur outside the cell. Carrere's estranged wife and son arrive to collect his belongings, a prison official explaining that Carrere and his cellmates have mysteriously vanished. As they drive home, Carrere's young son plays with the action figure that his father had kept in his cell. The doll's head is seen in close-up and is revealed to have Carrere's living eyes, now able to see his son.

== Cast ==
- Gérald Laroche - Carrère
- Philippe Laudenbach - Lassalle
- Clovis Cornillac - Marcus
- Dimitri Rataud - Pâquerette
- Didier Bénureau - Hippolyte Picus
- Geoffrey Carey - Charles Danvers
