= Sylvie Granotier =

French actress, translator, writer and screenwriter

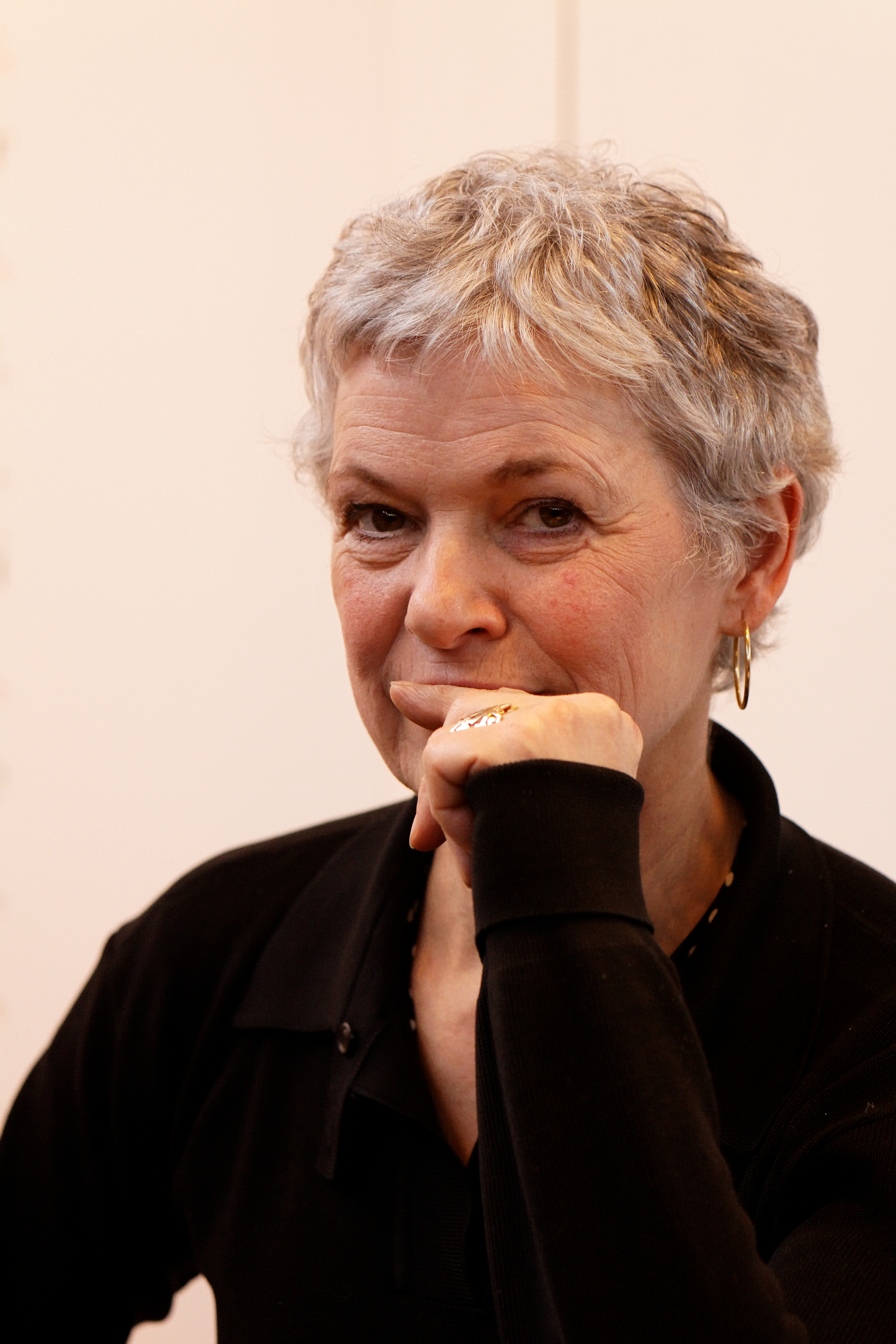
- Sylvie Granotier at the Paris Book Fair in 2011.
- Born: Sylvie Granotier; 19 March 1951 (age 75); Algiers, Algeria
- Occupations: novelist; actress; screenwriter; translator
- Writing career
- Language: French
- Genres: Detective novel, novel
- Notable awards: Prix Mauvais genres 2015 for No one will know

Sylvie Granotier (born 19 March 1951) is a French television and film actress and screenwriter. She is also a writer of detective novels and a translator of novels written in the English language.

== Biography ==
Sylvie Granotier spent her early years in Blida, before entering primary school in the 14th arrondissement of Paris, then continuing her education in Marrakech and finally at the girls' high school in Rabat.

After her baccalaureate, she entered the University of Nanterre where she obtained a degree in Letters. At the same time, she took drama lessons and held various odd jobs. In the 1970s, she became a model and made many international trips. She then became a screenwriter and actress for theatre, cinema and television. She also wrote the translation of Huge Last Minute Change by Grace Paley.

In 1990, she published Courrier posthume, a first novel about the difficult relationship between a daughter and her mother. In Dead Without a Tomorrow, her first detective novel, a man is the victim of a set-up where a criminal tries to make him take responsibility for the murder of a woman. Comme un coq en plâtre (1996) is a humorous detective novel starring Cheryl, the Octopus' companion. With Hot sweats (1997) and Dodo (1999), the humor and comedy of the story are tempered by the register of the noir novel in which Double Je (2002) resolutely pours, a dark story that challenges the French political milieu.

In 2015, she was crowned the Prix Mauvais genres for Nobody will know anything about it.

Since the 1990s, Sylvie Granotier has lived part of the year in Creuse, in the region of Pontarion.

== Filmography ==
=== Actress ===
==== Movie theater ====
- 1981 : Come to my house, I live with a friend by Patrice Leconte, with Michel Blanc, Bernard Giraudeau, Thérèse Liotard and Anémone
- 1982 : The last day, short film by Jacques Cortal, with Gilles Béhat and Roland Blanche
- 1983 : Souvenir de Juan-Les-Pins by Pascale Ferran, with Christine Murillo
- 1984 : La Diagonale du fou by Richard Dembo, with Michel Piccoli, Liv Ullmann and Jean-Hugues Anglade
- 1984 : The Ivory Woman by Dominique Cheminal, with Lucas Belvaux and Dora Doll
- 1985 : À cœur perdu, short film by Patricia Valeix, with Pierre Arditi
- 1987 : Tandem by Patrice Leconte, with Gérard Jugnot and Jean Rochefort
- 1988 : Savannah by Marco Pico, with Jacques Higelin and Marcel Bozzuffi
- 1990 : L'Affaire Wallraff (original title The Man Inside) by Bobby Roth, with Jürgen Prochnow, Peter Coyote and Nathalie Baye
- 1993 : Should we love Mathilde? by Edwin Baily, with Dominique Blanc and Paul Crauchet
- 1995 : New World by Alain Corneau, with James Gandolfini and Guy Marchand
- 1998 : If I love you, take care of yourself by Jeanne Labrune, with Daniel Duval, Nathalie Baye and Jean-Pierre Darroussin
- 2000 : Best Female Hope by Gérard Jugnot, with Bérénice Bejo, Antoine Duléry and Sabine Haudepin
- 2003 : Unknown at this address, short film by François Chayé and Sandrine Treiner, with Claude-Jean Philippe
- 2008 : Don't Look Back by Marina de Van, with Monica Bellucci and Sophie Marceau
- 2012 : Three worlds by Catherine Corsini, with Raphaël Personnaz, Clotilde Hesme, and Arta Dobroshi

==== Television ====
- 1977 : At the pleasure of God : Mirette
- 1980 : Papa Poule (series) by Roger Kahane : Joëlle (season 1 episode 4)
- 1985 : The Hearse Mule by Claude Vajda
- 1989 : Marat de Maroun Bagdadi : Mme de Nairac
- 1990 : Coma exceeded by Roger Pigaut : Marion Lipari
- 1994 : Jalna by Philippe Monnier (TV series)
- 1997 : Navarro, episode A woman on the index : Doctor Olivia Morland
- 1997 : Family perfume by Serge Moati
- 1997 : Maigret and the Altar Boy by Pierre Granier-Deferre
- 2002 : La Dette by Fabrice Cazeneuve : the prefect's wife
- 2003 : A hot summer by Sébastien Grall : Nicole
- 2003 : The Cordiers, judge and cop, Case study episode : Delphine Darcourt
- 2005 : Navarro, Escort blues episode : Mathilde Girardin
- 2006 : Memory of Ice by Pierre-Antoine Hiroz : Isabelle Santini
- 2008 : Blood and Ink by Charlotte Brändström
- 2010 : Between two waters by Michaëla Watteaux
- 2010 : An uncertain place by Josée Dayan
- 2012 : Dark room by Arnauld Malherbe
- 2013 : The Hands of Roxana by Philippe Setbon
- 2014 : Origins of Jérôme Navarro
- 2016 : Black Baron by Ziad Doueiri
- 2017 : Profiling of Fanny Robert and Sophie Lebarbier : Nicole Marceau
- 2018 : Beyond Appearances by Éric Woreth : Jeanne
- 2019 : Suspicions of Lionel Bailliu : Anna
- 2019 : From one world to another by Didier Bivel : Nicole
- 2020 : Julien Zidi 's Channel of Secrets : Madeleine
- 2021 : HPI (season 2, episode 3 “ Made in France ”), directed by Vincent Jamain : Madame Sarah

=== Scriptwriter ===
==== Movie theater ====
- 1989 : Pentimento by Tonie Marshall
- 1994 : Coma by Denys Granier-Deferre

==== Television ====
- 2010 : A hint of innocence by Olivier Péray
- 2015 : They... The Daughters of Plessis by Bénédicte Delmas
- 2019 : Suspicions of Lionel Bailliu : Anne
- 2019 : From one world to another (TV movie) by Didier Bivel

== Publications ==
=== Novels ===
- Posthumous mail, Paris, Régine Deforges, 1990 ; reissue, Paris, Éditions La Baleine, 1999; reissue, Paris, Gallimard, Police folio no. 125, 1999
- Death without a Tomorrow, Paris, Ramsay, 1992
- Like a rooster in plaster, Paris, La Baleine, collection Le Poulpe no 28, 1998
- Hot Sweats, Paris, Gallimard, Black Series No. 2447, 1997; reissue, Paris, Gallimard, Police folio no 187, 2000
- This girl is dangerous (short novel), La Poiré-sur-Vie, Éditions de la Loupiote, coll. "Zebras", 1998
- Dodo, Paris, Gallimard, Black Series No. 2550, 1999
- A simple formality, Paris, Marais du Livre, 2001 (in collaboration with Lucien Suel)
- Double I, Paris, Albin Michel, 2002; reissue, Paris, Le Livre de poche no . 17314, 2003
- The past never forgets, Paris, Albin Michel, 2005; reissue, Paris, The Pocket Book No. 37100, 2005
- Beautiful to kill, Paris, Albin Michel, 2006; reissue, Paris, Le Livre de poche no. 37286, 2008
- Killing is not playing, Paris, Albin Michel, 2008; reissue, Paris, Le Livre de poche no. 31537, 2009
- Beware, little girl, Paris, Editions La Branche, coll. Suite Noire No. 32, 2009
- But where are you from?, Paris, Le Seuil, 2010 (in collaboration with Michèle Lesbre)
- The Rigole of the Devil, Paris, Albin Michel, 2011
- The Place of the Dead, Paris, Albin Michel, 2013
- Nobody will know, Paris, Albin Michel, 2014- Bad Genres Award 2015
- An ideal world, Paris, Albin Michel, 2019

=== Collections of stories ===
- This girl is dangerous, Paris, Albin Michel, 1998; reissue, Paris, Le Livre de poche no. 30607, 2004 Reissue of the short novel accompanied by some short stories.

=== Books of children's and youth literature ===
- Family Secrets, Paris, Albin Michel, Le Furet No. 1, 1998; reissue, Paris, Albin Michel Youth, 2000

=== Radio drama ===
- Blind spot (duration approximately 58 min), broadcast on 31 March 2012 on France Culture, as part of the show Funny dramas and a "Polar Cycle".

== Bibliography ==
- Mesplède, Claude (2007). Joseph K (ed.). Dictionnaire des littératures policières (in French). Vol. 1. Nantes. pp. 882–883. ISBN 978-2-910-68644-4. OCLC 315873251.
