= The Last Mitterrand =

- Film poster
- Directed by: Robert Guédiguian
- Written by: Georges-Marc Benamou
- Produced by: Marc de Bayser; Robert Guédiguian; Frank Le Wita
- Starring: Michel Bouquet; Jalil Lespert; Sarah Grappin
- Cinematography: Renato Berta
- Edited by: Bernard Sasia
- Distributed by: Pathé
- Release date: 29 July 2005
- Running time: 117 minutes
- Country: France
- Language: French

The Last Mitterrand (French title: Le Promeneur du Champ de Mars, literally The Walker on the Champ de Mars) is a 2005 film directed by Robert Guédiguian depicting the final period in the life of an unnamed French President (but the English title and the French title of the book upon which the film is based suggests the president is François Mitterrand). The film is based on the book Le Dernier Mitterrand (literally, "the last Mitterrand") by Georges-Marc Benamou. The film "recreates in semi-fictional form the relationship between the young journalist, here called Antoine Moreau, and the dying president... [who] draws Antoine into the world of his fears, and his sense of French culture".

== Plot summary ==
The film concerns the last years of François Mitterrand, and his final weeks at L'Élysée, then the time spent at an official residence at 9, avenue Frédéric-Le-Play in the 7the arrondissement of Paris where he was able to take walks in the nearby Champ-de-Mars. Moreau, the journalist, fascinated by the personality of the president, is drawn into the president's close circle; he spends much time with him travelling in France, even going to his birthday dinner.

== Cast ==
- Michel Bouquet : The president (no name is used in the film)
- Jalil Lespert : Antoine Moreau, journalist
- Philippe Fretun : Docteur Jeantot
- Anne Cantineau : Jeanne
- Sarah Grappin : Judith
- Catherine Salviat : Mado, mother of Jeanne
- Jean-Claude Frissung : René, father of Jeanne
- Philippe Le Mercier : Fleury, body-guard
- Serge Kribus : Riou, the chauffeur
- Jean-Claude Bourbault : librarian
- Grégoire Oestermann : Garland
- Béatrice Bruno : Thérèse Manicourt
- Philippe Lehembre : Chazelles
- Istvan Van Heuverzwyn : Deletraz
- Rémy Darcy : Ladrière
- Geneviève Casile : Simone Picard
- Gisèle Casadesus : sister of Simone Picard

== Background ==
Benamou had talked with and accompanied Mitterrand for the last 1,000 days of his presidency. Benamou worked for a small circulation magazine called Globe - a magazine for champagne socialists - la gauche caviar in the French idiom. It is not clear why Mitterrand chose Benamou but the journalist said they got on well and discussed life, women and literature.

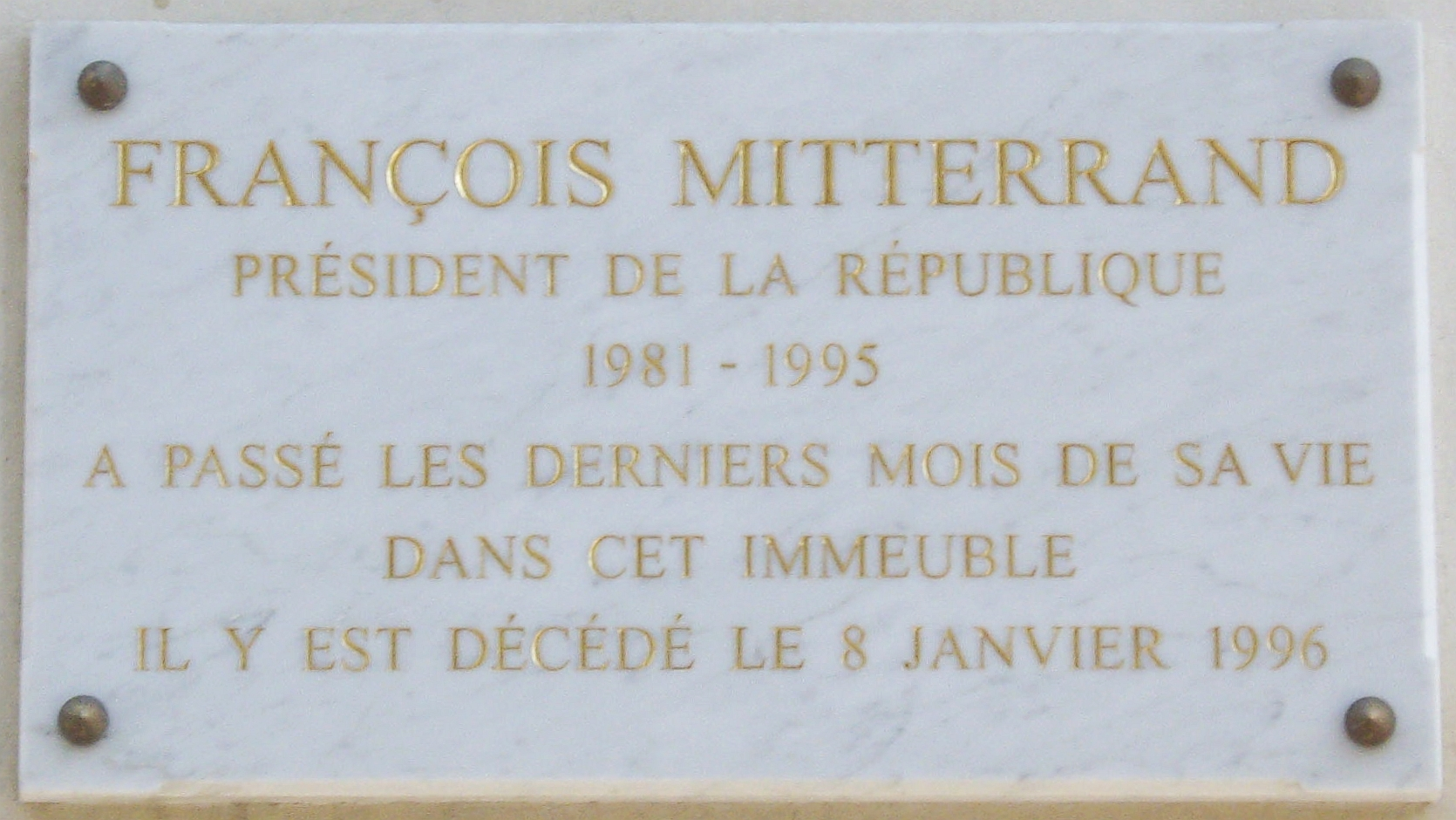
Plaque at 9, avenue Frédéric-Le-Play in the 7th arrondissement of Paris. Mitterrand could walk in the nearby Champ-de-Mars.

When the resulting book appeared in 1997 however, Benamou was turned upon by many of Mitterrand's family and associates - even Pierre Bergé, who financed the Globe magazine called it a work of "absolute treachery" - and they would not help with the film. It seems they were particularly outraged not by revelations about Mitterrand's private life (Mitterrand had a secret second family including the daughter he kept hidden from the public), or anything to do with Vichy, but with a description of Mitterrand devouring a plateful of ortolans, a protected species, eating them forbidden under EU law. Certain other people at the dinner called Benamou a liar saying this incident never happened. Benamou denied this. In 2004 one of Mitterrand's closest associates, who had also been at the meal said Benamou was right but no ortolans appear in the film and Mitterrand eats a plate of oysters. Benamou, an Algerian born Sephardic Jew, asserted that he had not found Mitterrand anti-semitic either in his time in Vichy or afterwards, something that Mitterrand, who sometimes spoke of 'le lobby juif', his term for some French Jews and their focus on his wartime record - had been accused of. Benamou defended Mitterrand in spite of his protection of collaborators like René Bousquet and Maurice Papon - "Papon became a minister under Giscard d'Estaing; he was chief of police under de Gaulle. This is not a secret of Mitterrand [but of] the French bourgeoisie and Mitterrand was an emblem of that."

The film won a César award for Michel Bouquet in his role as Mitterrand.
