= Paris by Night (2012 film) =

- Film poster
- French: Une nuit
- Directed by: Philippe Lefebvre
- Written by: Simon Michael; Philippe Isard; Philippe Lefebvre
- Starring: Roschdy Zem; Sara Forestier; Samuel Le Bihan
- Cinematography: Jérôme Almeras
- Music by: Pierre Gamet
- Release date: 4 January 2012
- Running time: 100 minutes
- Country: France
- Language: French

Paris by Night (French: Une nuit; lit. 'One night') is a 2012 French crime film directed by Philippe Lefebvre.

== Plot ==
Each night, vice police captain Simon Weiss checks a number of night clubs. As he tries to ensure they obey the law, he has to deal with gangsters, drug dealers and the suspicions of his own force.

== Cast ==
- Roschdy Zem as Simon Weiss
- Sara Forestier as Laurence Deray
- Samuel Le Bihan as Tony Garcia
- Grégory Fitoussi as Paul Gorsky
- Jean-Pierre Martins as Jo Linder
- Jean-Paul Muel as Solange
- Sophie Broustal as Josy, the boss at the "Magnifique"
- Gérald Laroche as Alex, the boss at the "No Comment"
