= New World (1995 film) =

Le Nouveau monde
- Directed by: Alain Corneau
- Produced by: Jean-Louis Livi
- Starring: Nicolas Chatel; Sarah Grappin; James Gandolfini; Alicia Silverstone
- Cinematography: William Lubtchansky
- Edited by: Adeline Yoyotte; Marie-Josèphe Yoyotte
- Release date: 1995
- Running time: 117 minutes
- Country: France
- Languages: French; English

Le Nouveau monde is a 1995 French drama film directed by Alain Corneau about post-World War II France, starring Nicolas Chatel and Sarah Grappin. It also features American actors including James Gandolfini and Alicia Silverstone. It is based on the novel L'Occupation américaine by Pascal Quignard.

== Plot ==
The 1950s in France. Patrick Carrion (Nicolas Chatel) is a young boy who worships all things American, and comes of age in a small village near a U.S. military base. He has a pleasant French life with a lovely girlfriend, Marie-José Vire (Sarah Grappin) and happy family. But one day, he meets an American soldier named Will Caberra (James Gandolfini) which changes his life forever. The soldier introduces Patrick to American music, fun, freedom and women. Under the soldier's tutelage, the boy follows his dream of becoming a drummer and falling in love with an American girl Trudy Wadd (Alicia Silverstone). Patrick's family and ex-girlfriend witness Patrick's heartbreak when he is faced with the reality that there is a price to pay with some American ways.

== Cast ==
- Nicolas Chatel : Patrick Carrion
- Sarah Grappin : Marie-José Vire
- James Gandolfini : Will Caberra
- Alicia Silverstone : Trudy Wadd
- Guy Marchand : Dr. Carrion
- Baptiste Trotignon : Rydell
- Sylvie Granotier : Mrs Carrion
- Simon Mary : Antoine
- Ronald Baker : Augustus
- David Johnson : Mel

== Production ==
In 2024, Sarah Grappin accused director Alain Corneau of sexually abusing her and exerting a controlling influence over her during and after the filming of this movie, when the actress was 16 years old.

== Release ==
It was released as New World, direct-to-video in America. The film was released on 22 February 1995 in France, 20 July 1996 in Japan and 13 January 1998 in Turkey.

== Tagline ==
- One American soldier would change their lives...forever.
