= Étais-la-Sauvin =

- Commune
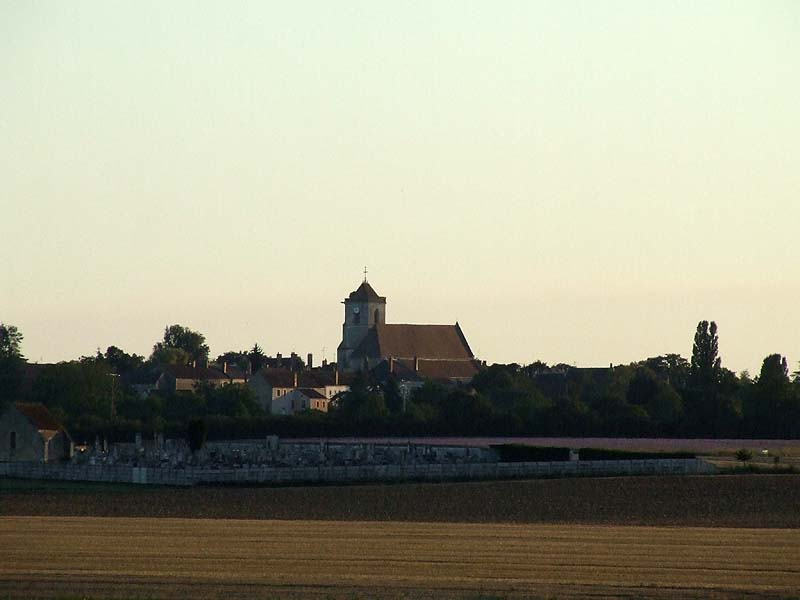
- View from the East

- Coat of arms
- Location of Étais-la-Sauvin
- Location within France Location within Bourgogne-Franche-Comté
- Coordinates: 47°30′14″N 3°20′47″E
- Country: France
- Region: Bourgogne-Franche-Comté
- Department: Yonne
- Arrondissement: Auxerre
- Canton: Vincelles

Government
  - Mayor (2020–2026): Claude Macchia
- Area^{1}: 44.79 km^{2} (17.29 sq mi)
- Highest elevation: 365 m (1,198 ft)
- Lowest elevation: 178 m (584 ft)
- Population (2023): 631
  - Density: 14.1/km^{2} (36.5/sq mi)
- Time zone: UTC+01:00 (CET)
  - Summer (DST): UTC+02:00 (CEST)
- INSEE/Postal code: 89158 /89480
- ^{1} French Land Register data, which excludes lakes, ponds, glaciers > 1 km^{2} (0.386 sq mi or 247 acres) and river estuaries.

Étais-la-Sauvin (French pronunciation: [etɛ la sovɛ̃]) is a commune in the Yonne department in Bourgogne-Franche-Comté in north-central France, in the natural region of Forterre.

The actress Juliette Carré lived in Étais-la-Sauvin.

== Gallery ==
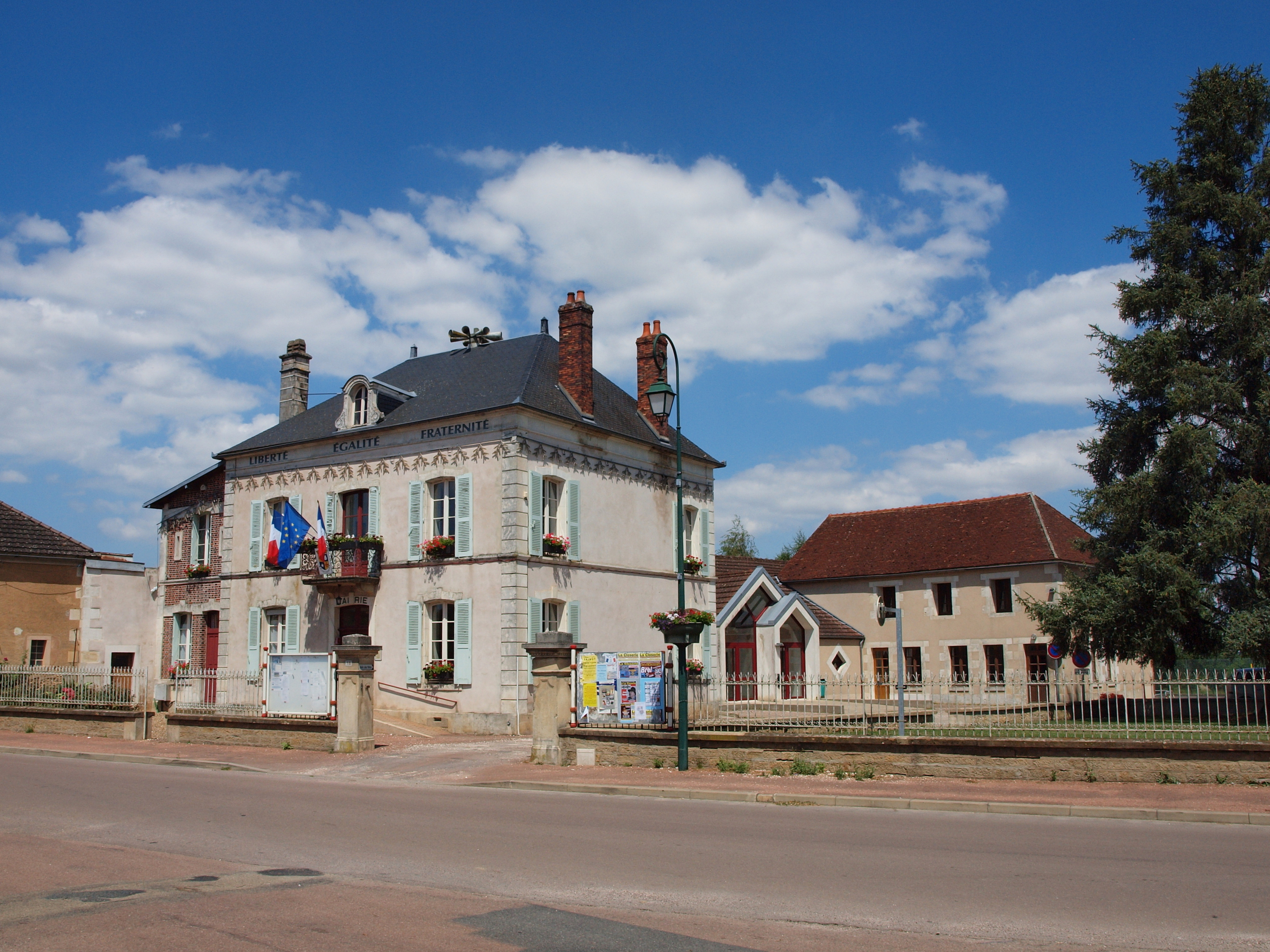
Town hall (mairie)

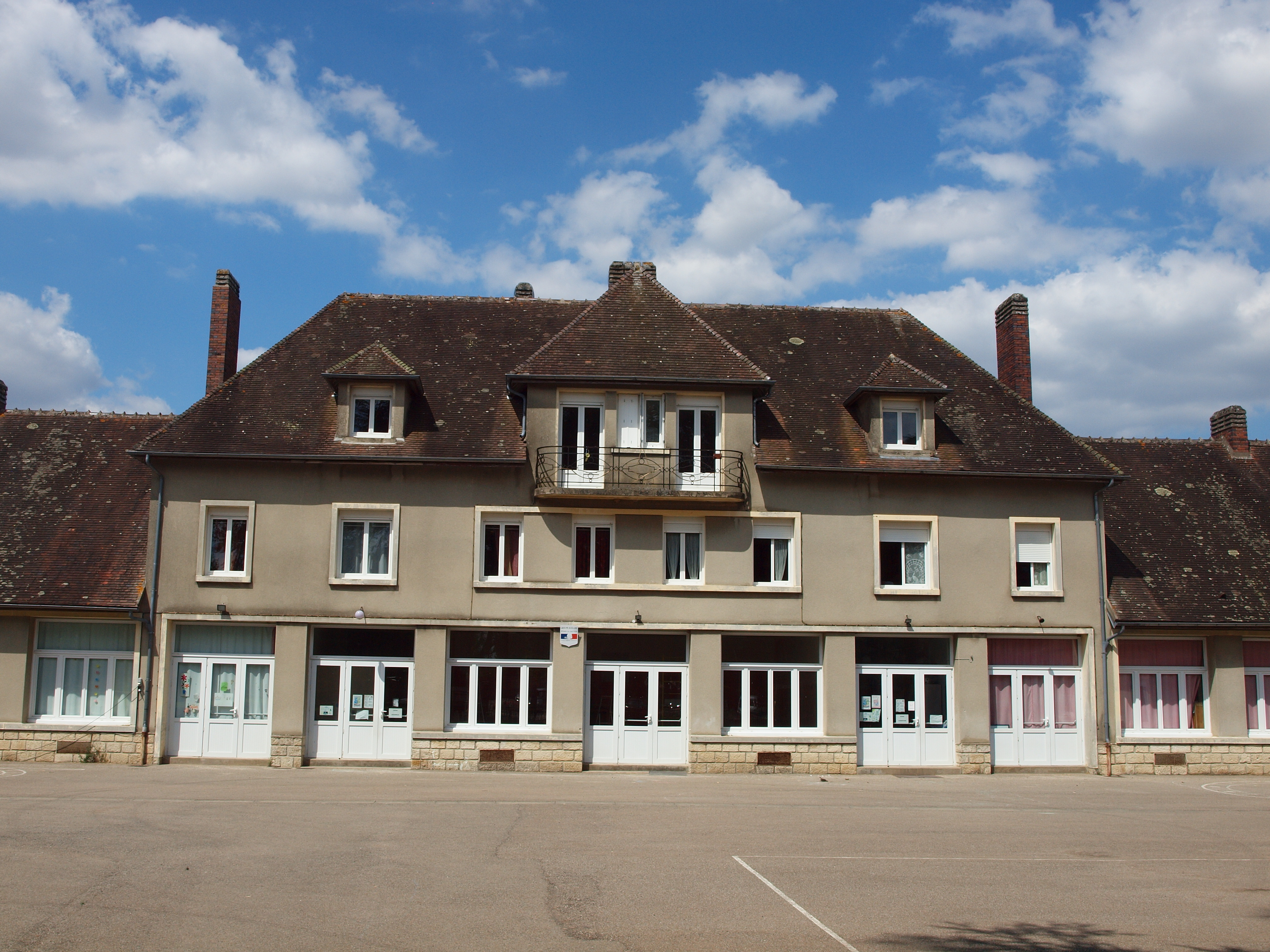
School

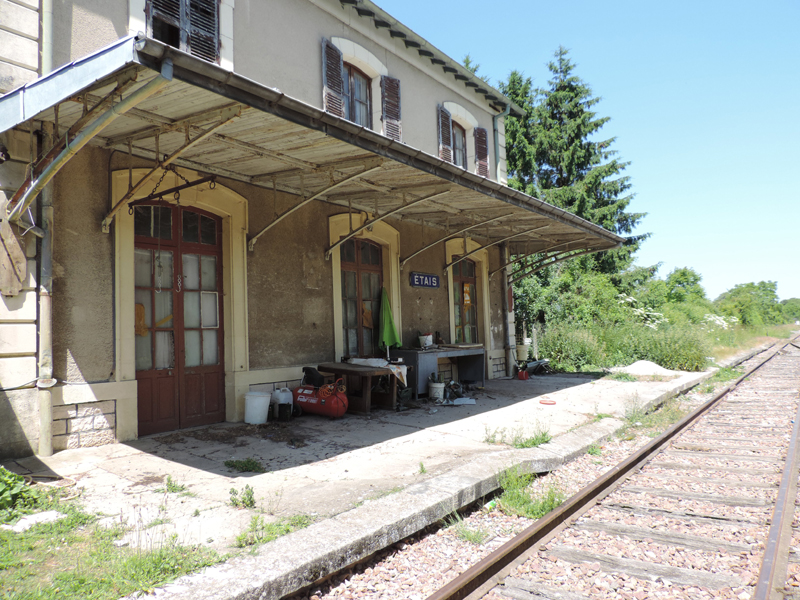
Train station

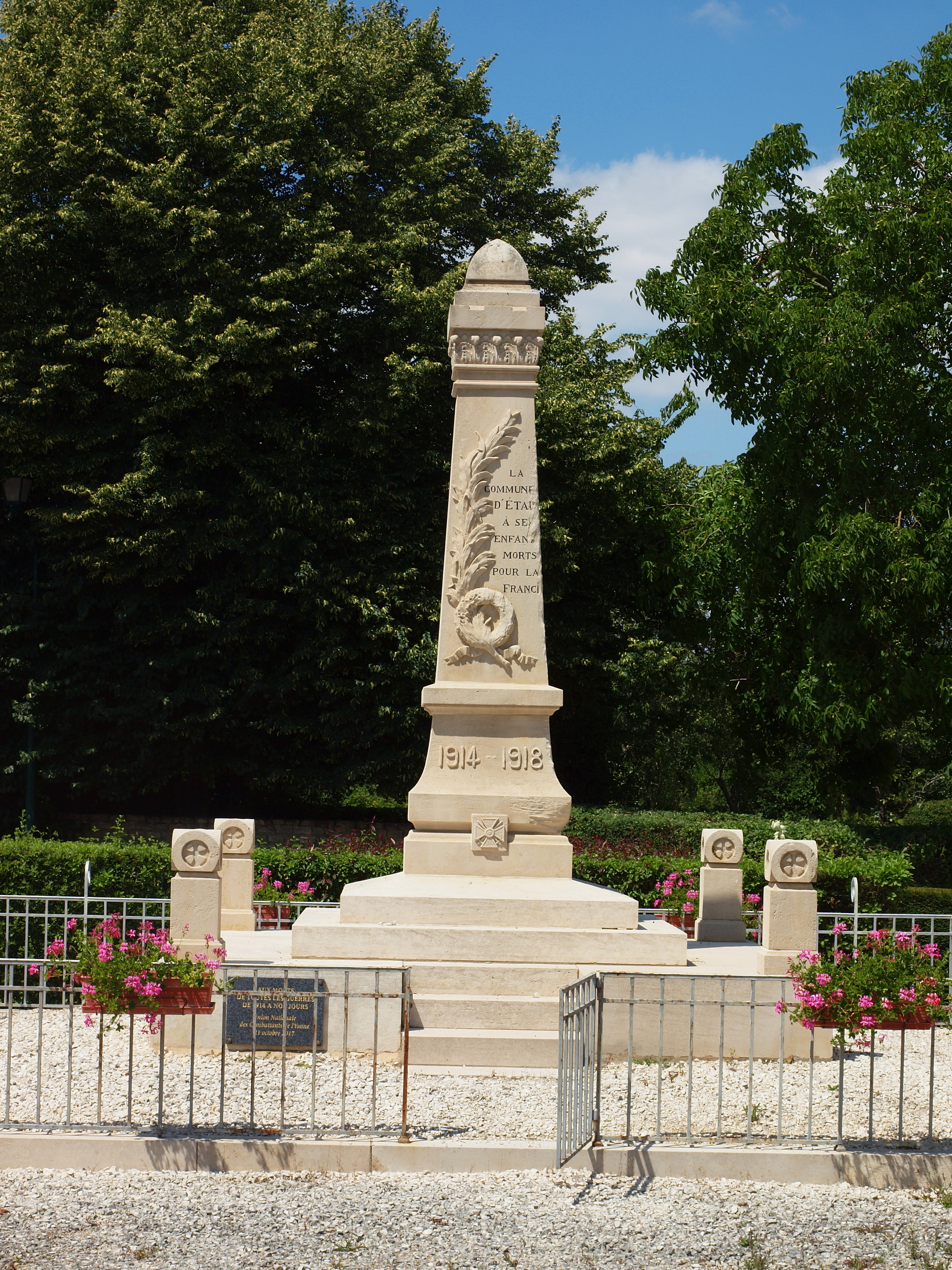
World War I memorial

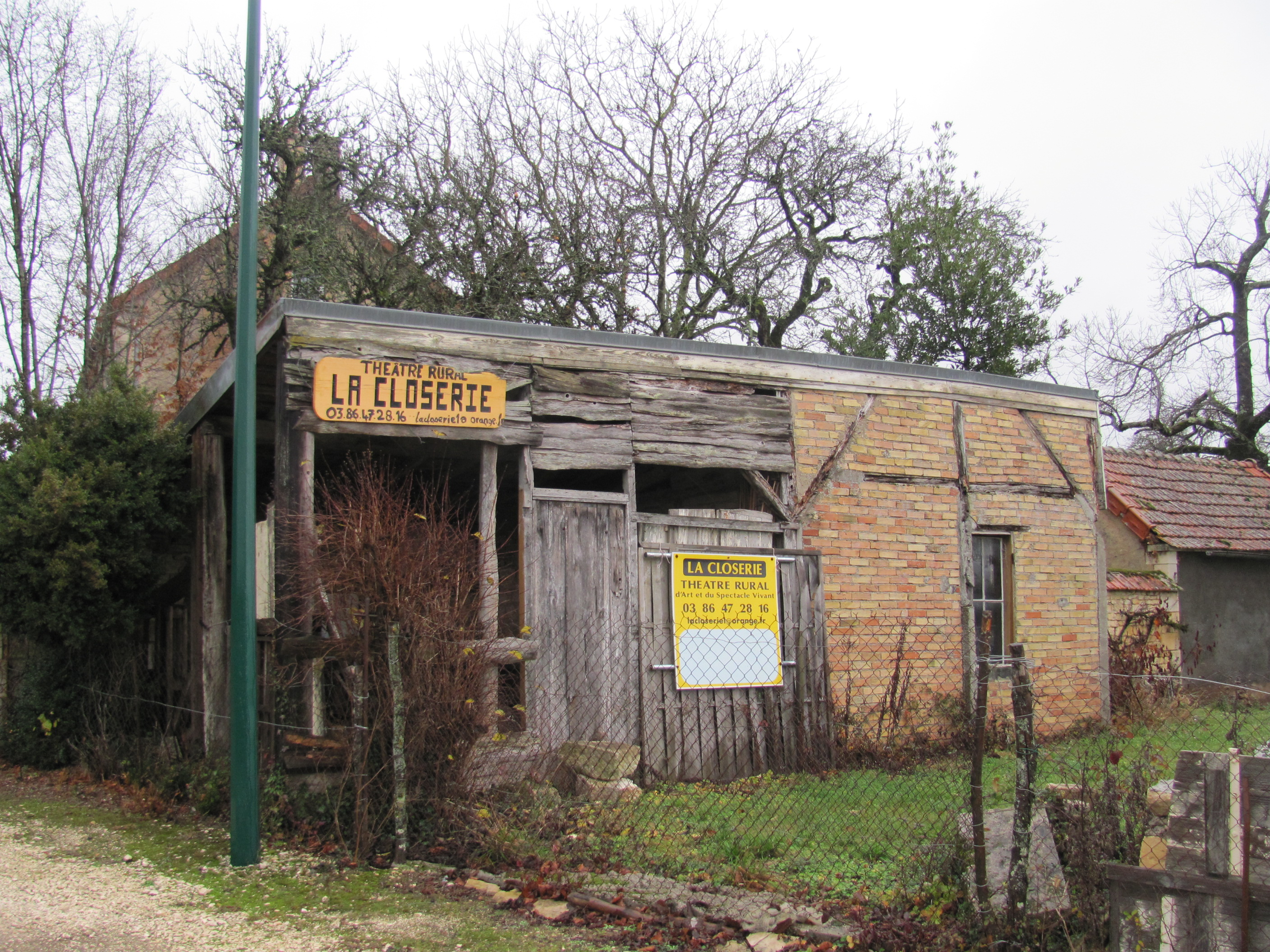
Rural theater "La Closerie"

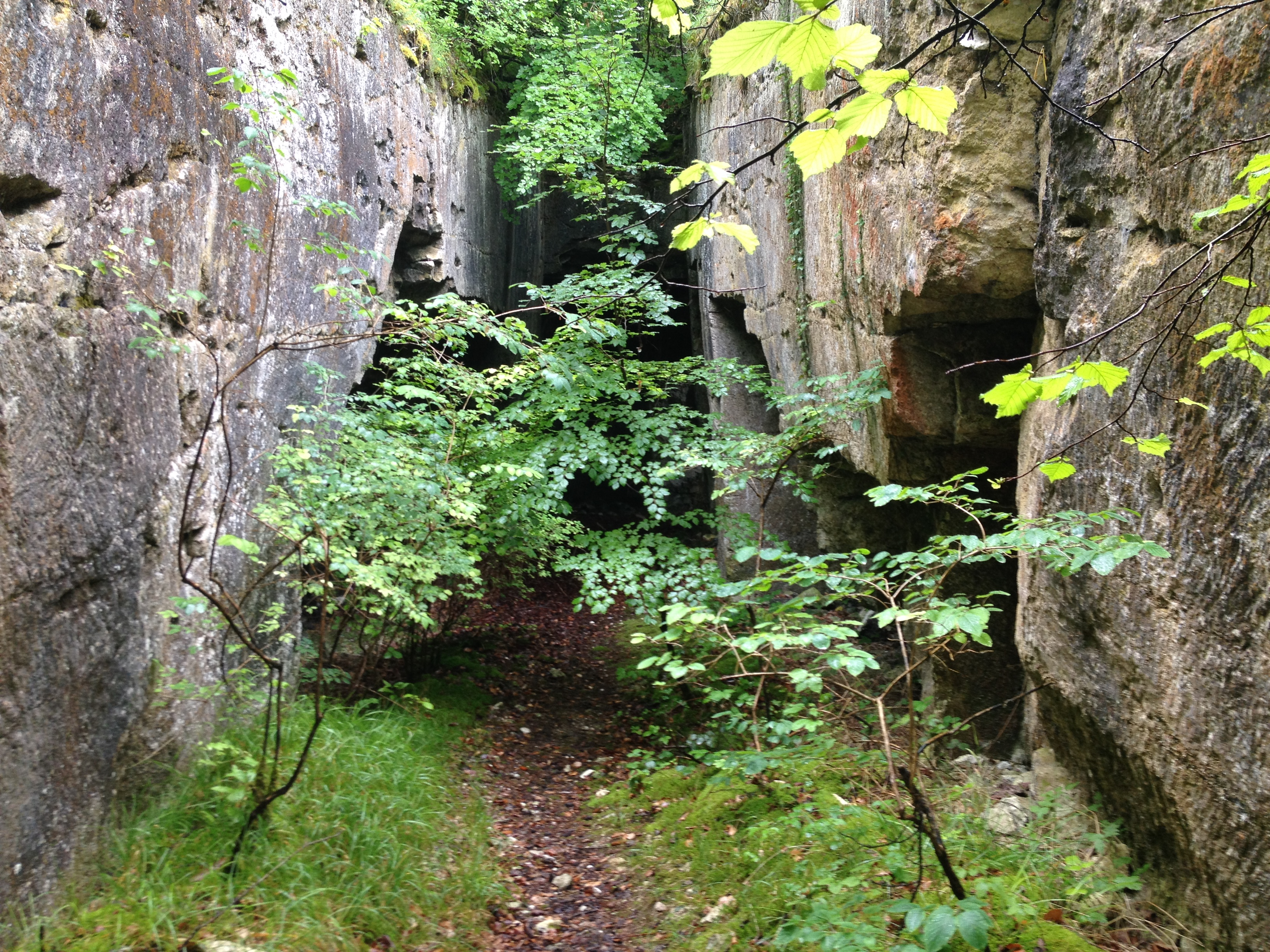
The Montagne des Allouettes quarry

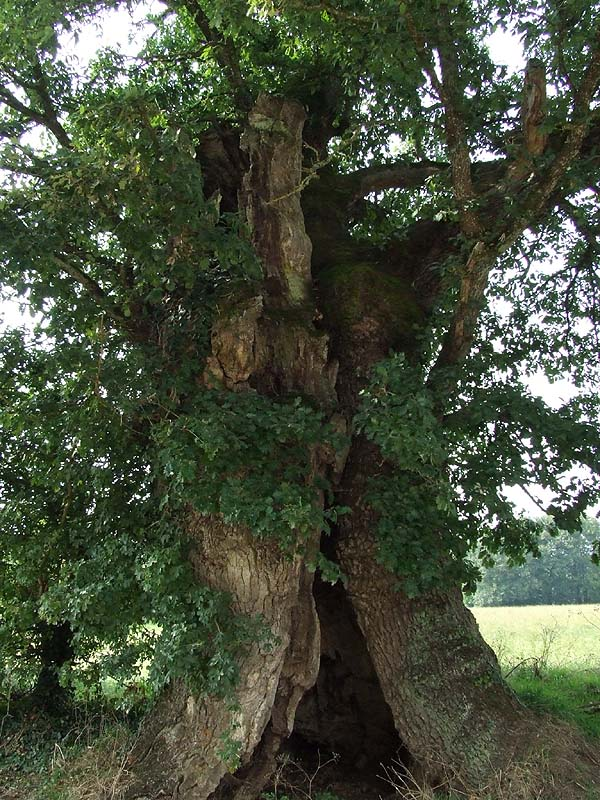
The 300-year-old Oak of Vellery

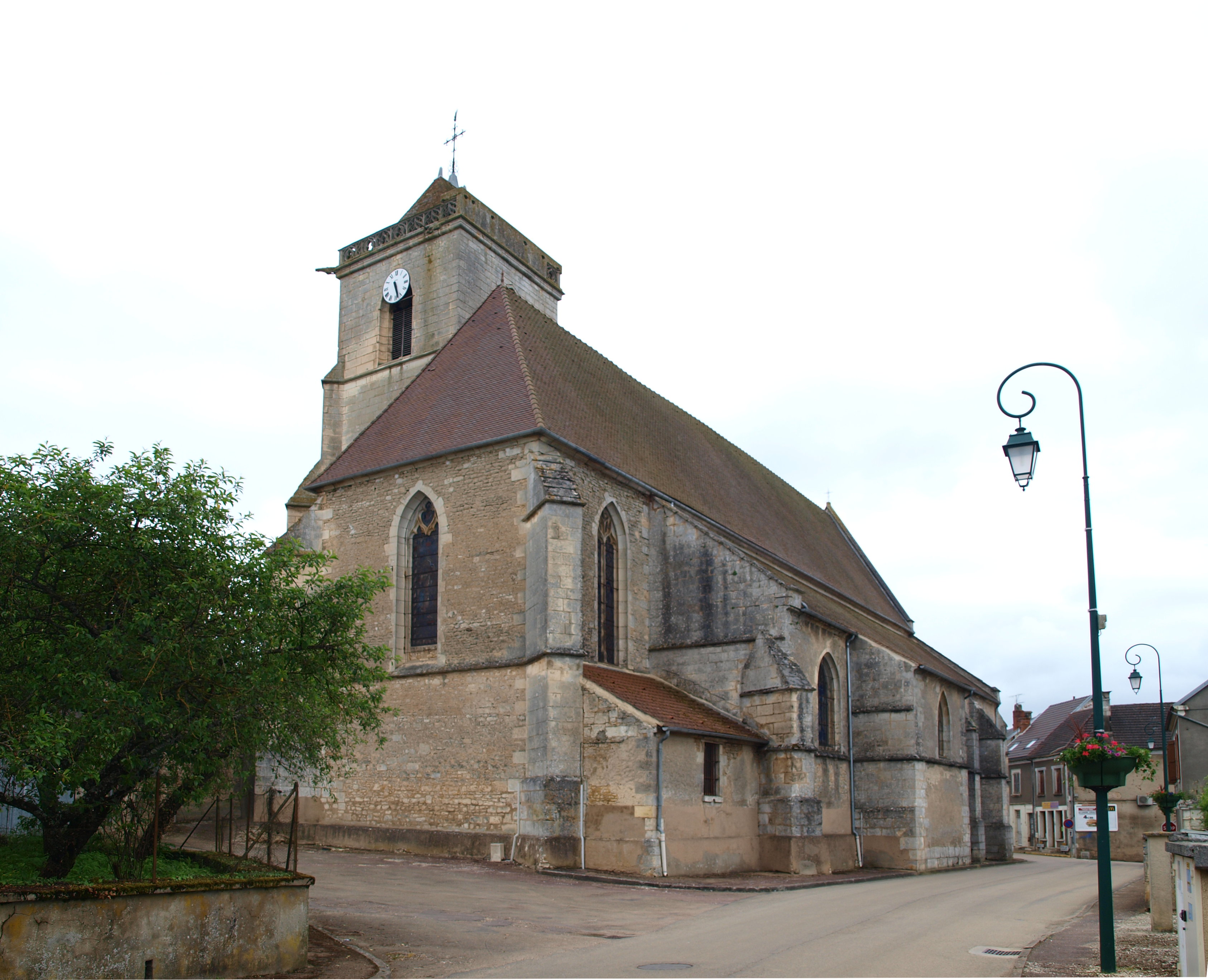
Church of Saint-Pierre-aux-Liens

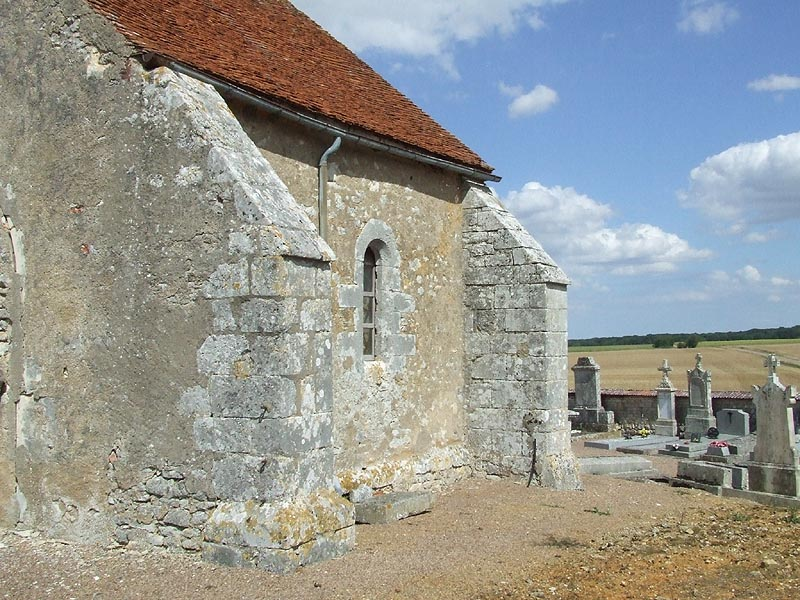
Former medieval church and cemetery

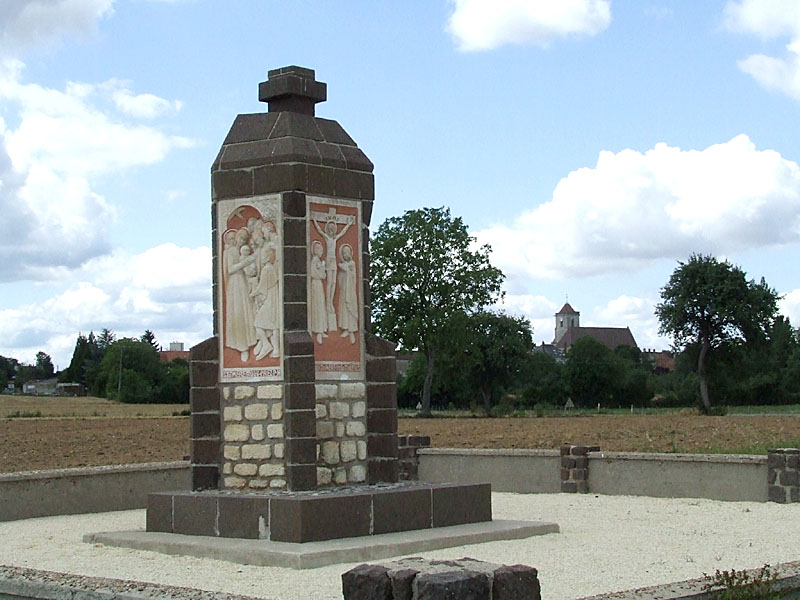
Monument to the Virgin Mary

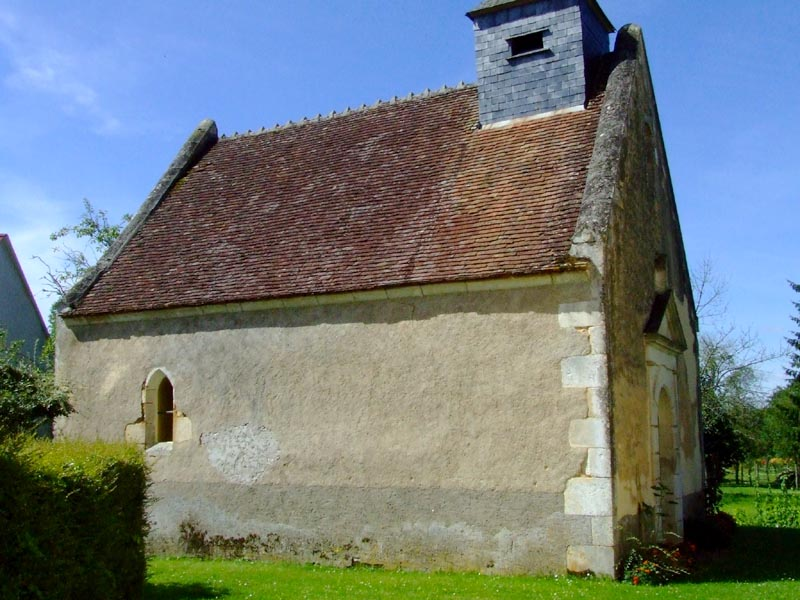
Chapel of Sainte Camille de Chevigny

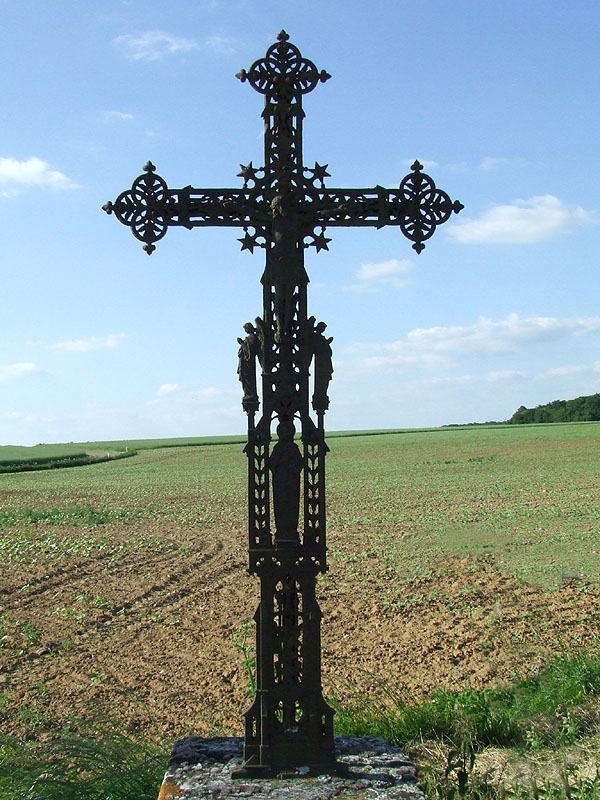
Cross of La Poterie

== See also ==
- Communes of the Yonne department
