= Les Côtelettes =

2003 film

- Film poster
- Directed by: Bertrand Blier
- Screenplay by: Bertrand Blier
- Based on: the play Les Côtelettes by Bertrand Blier
- Produced by: Luc Besson; Bernard Bouix; René Cleitman
- Starring: Philippe Noiret; Michel Bouquet
- Cinematography: François Catonné
- Edited by: Marion Monestier
- Music by: Hugues Le Bars
- Distributed by: EuropaCorp. Distribution
- Release dates: 24 May 2003 (Cannes); 28 May 2003 (France)
- Running time: 86 minutes
- Country: France
- Language: French
- Budget: €5.3 million
- Box office: $456,587

Les Côtelettes is a 2003 French drama film directed by Bertrand Blier. It was entered into the 2003 Cannes Film Festival.

== Cast ==
- Philippe Noiret as Léonce Grison
- Michel Bouquet as Potier
- Farida Rahouadj as Nacifa
- Catherine Hiegel as Death
- Hammou Graïa as Nacifa's Husband
- Axelle Abbadie as Bénédicte
- Anne Suarez as Agathe
- Jérôme Hardelay as Xavier
- Franck de la Personne as Doctor
- Jean-Jérôme Esposito as Infirmier 2
- Luc Palun as Infirmier 1
