= Sarah Grappin =

French actress (born 1978)

- Born: Sarah Grappin; 11 August 1978 (age 47); Paris, France
- Years active: 1994–present

Sarah Grappin (born 11 August 1978) is a French actress.

== Selected filmography ==
| Year | Film | Role | Notes |
|---|---|---|---|
| 1995 | Le Nouveau monde | Marie-José Vire | (New World) |
| 1998 | Petits Désordres amoureux | Sophie | (Small Disorders of Love) |
| 1999 | Nos vies heureuses | Sylvie | (Our Happy Lives) |
| 2002 | Froid comme l'été | Rachel | (Cold as Summer), TV Film |
| 2003 | Je t'aime, Je t'adore | Delphine | (I Love You, I Adore You) |
| 2005 | Le Promeneur du Champ de Mars | Judith | (The Last Mitterrand) |
| 2008 | La tangente | Her | (The Tangent), short |
| 2008 | Répercussions | Emma Lambert | (Repercussions), TV Film |
| 2009 | Ah! La libido | Charlotte | (Ah! The Libido) |
| 2017 | Back to Burgundy | La mère | |
