= Love Crime =

- Theatrical release poster
- French: Crime d'amour
- Directed by: Alain Corneau
- Written by: Alain Corneau; Natalie Carter
- Produced by: Saïd Ben Saïd
- Starring: Ludivine Sagnier; Kristin Scott Thomas
- Cinematography: Yves Angelo
- Edited by: Thierry Derocles
- Music by: Pharoah Sanders
- Production companies: SBS Films; France 2 Cinéma; Divali Films; Sofica UGC 1; Canal+; CinéCinéma; France Télévisions
- Distributed by: UGC Distribution
- Release date: 18 August 2010 (France)
- Running time: 106 minutes
- Country: France
- Languages: French; English
- Budget: €6.9 million
- Box office: $3.6 million

Love Crime (French: Crime d'amour) is a 2010 French psychological thriller film directed by Alain Corneau and starring Ludivine Sagnier and Kristin Scott Thomas. It was Corneau's final film, released shortly before his death in August 2010.

== Plot ==
Isabelle is a young, ambitious, and talented executive working in the Paris office of an American corporation. Her immediate boss is Christine, equally ambitious, who presents Isabelle's work as her own to win a promotion to the firm's New York office. Tired of being upstaged, and with the aid of a sympathetic colleague, Daniel, Isabelle blindsides Christine with a secret project that the New York office enthusiastically endorses. Christine's New York promotion is subsequently withdrawn. Enraged by what she considers an act of disloyalty, Christine begins to psychologically torment Isabelle. Christine's lover, Philippe, works with the firm and is suspected of embezzling funds. Using this information against him, she blackmails Philippe into ending his relationship with Isabelle, with whom he is having an affair, leaving her inconsolable. Isabelle is then humiliated at a staff party in which security camera footage of her meltdown is presented to her colleagues.

Relaxing alone at home after hosting another soiree, Christine is stabbed to death by Isabelle, who plants evidence at the home implicating herself as the killer. With police pursuing the obvious motive that she was taking revenge for her various humiliations at the hands of Christine, Isabelle is arrested and, despite giving all the signs of being in the grips of a nervous breakdown, confesses to, and then is charged with, her murder. Awaiting sentencing in prison, Isabelle withdraws her confession, claiming it was made under duress and while heavily medicated. She begins to pick apart the circumstantial evidence implicating her guilt; scratches on her arm thought to be knife wounds were from a gardening accident, witnesses testify to seeing her at a cinema at the time of the murder and a kitchen knife thought to be the murder weapon is actually located in Isabelle's shed. The last piece of evidence is a torn strip of a scarf found at the murder scene, an item originally given to Isabelle by Christine as a gift. When Isabelle is able to produce an identical scarf, completely intact, at her home, she is cleared of the charges and released from prison.

Acting on a tip provided by Isabelle herself, police learn of Philippe's embezzlement, and a search of his property locates the remaining section of the scarf in his vehicle, planted there by Isabelle as part of an elaborate effort to frame him. He is arrested and charged. Isabelle, now free of both her nemeses, returns triumphantly to her company. Her loyal collaborator Daniel then reveals that he was aware of her game all along. Viewers are left to ponder what price he will exact for his silence, or whether she will silence him first.

== Cast ==
- Ludivine Sagnier as Isabelle Guérin
- Kristin Scott Thomas as Christine Riviére
- Patrick Mille as Philippe Deschamps
- Guillaume Marquet as Daniel
- Gérald Laroche as Gérard
- Olivier Rabourdin as the judge
- Marie Guillard as Claudine (sister)
- Mike Powers as boss 1
- Matthew Gonder as boss 2
- Jean-Pierre Leclerc as Gérard
- Stéphane Roquet as Fabien
- Frédéric Venant as Cadre
- Benoît Ferreux as angry man

== Production ==
Filming partially took place at the prison in Coulaines (Sarthe).

== Release ==
The film opened in the United States in September 2011 in a limited release through Sundance Selects. The dialogue is in both French and English; English being spoken only when the characters of Christine and Isabelle have to interact or deal with foreign clients who do not speak French.

== Reception ==
On Rotten Tomatoes, the film holds an approval rating of 64% based on 78 reviews, with an average rating of 6.2/10. The site's critics consensus reads, "Director Corneau's swan song, Love Crime is smart and typically well-directed, but too thin and formulaic to overcome its melodramatic trappings."

== Remake ==
A French-German remake of Love Crime, titled Passion, was directed by Brian De Palma and released in 2012, starring Rachel McAdams and Noomi Rapace in the lead roles. It was sold at the 2012 Cannes Film Festival. The film was selected to compete for the Golden Lion at the 69th Venice International Film Festival.
