= Alain Corneau =

French film director and writer (1943–2010)

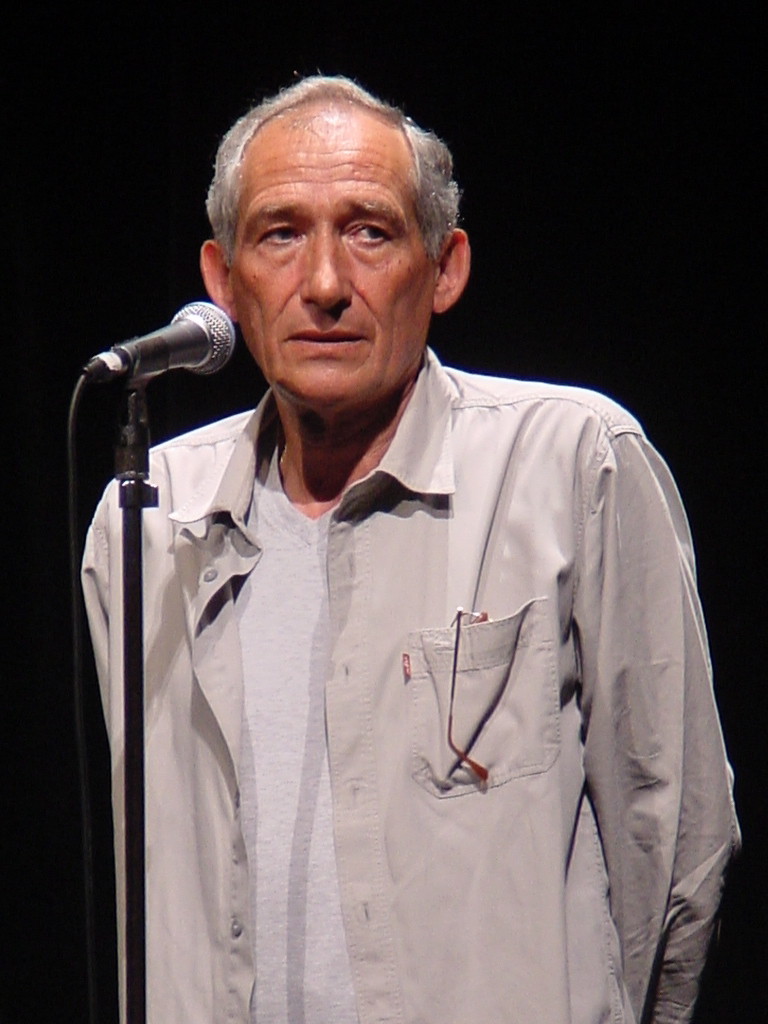
- Born: 7 August 1943; Meung-sur-Loire, Loiret, France
- Died: 30 August 2010 (aged 67); Paris, France
- Occupations: Film director, writer
- Spouse: Nadine Trintignant (m. 1998)

Alain Corneau (7 August 1943 – 30 August 2010) was a French film director and writer.

Corneau was born in Meung-sur-Loire, Loiret. Originally a musician, he worked with Costa-Gavras as an assistant, which was also his first opportunity to work with the actor Yves Montand, with whom he would collaborate three times later in his career, including Police Python 357 (1976) and La Menace (1977). He directed Gérard Depardieu in the screen adaptation of Tous les matins du monde in 1991.

Corneau died in Paris on 30 August 2010 from cancer, aged 67 and was interred at Père Lachaise Cemetery.

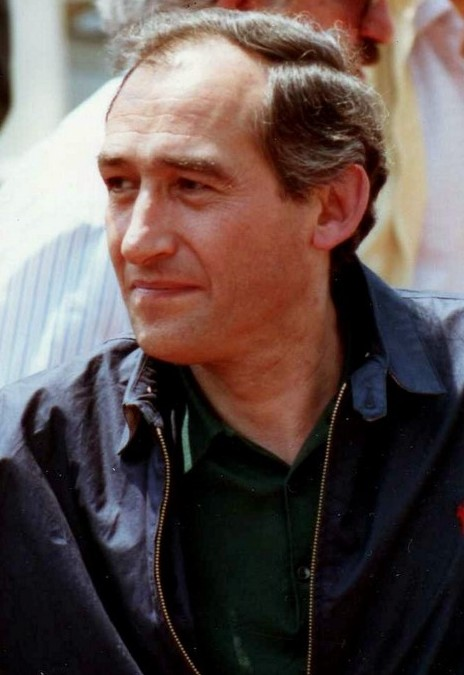
Alain Corneau at the Cannes Film Festival in 1990

In 2024, Corneau was posthumously accused by actress Sarah Grappin of grooming her when she was 16.

== Filmography ==
- France, Inc. (1973)
- Police Python 357 (1976)
- La Menace (1977)
- Série noire (1979)
- Choice of Arms (1981)
- Fort Saganne (1984)
- Le Môme (1986)
- Nocturne Indien (1989)
- Tous les Matins du Monde (1991)
- New World (1995)
- Le cousin (1997)
- Le prince du Pacifique (2000)
- Stupeur et Tremblements (2003)
- Words in Blue (2005)
- Le Deuxième souffle (2007)
- Love Crime (2010)

== Honours ==
- Chevalier (Knight) of the Order of Legion of Honour
