= Françoise Dorléac =

French actress (1942–1967)

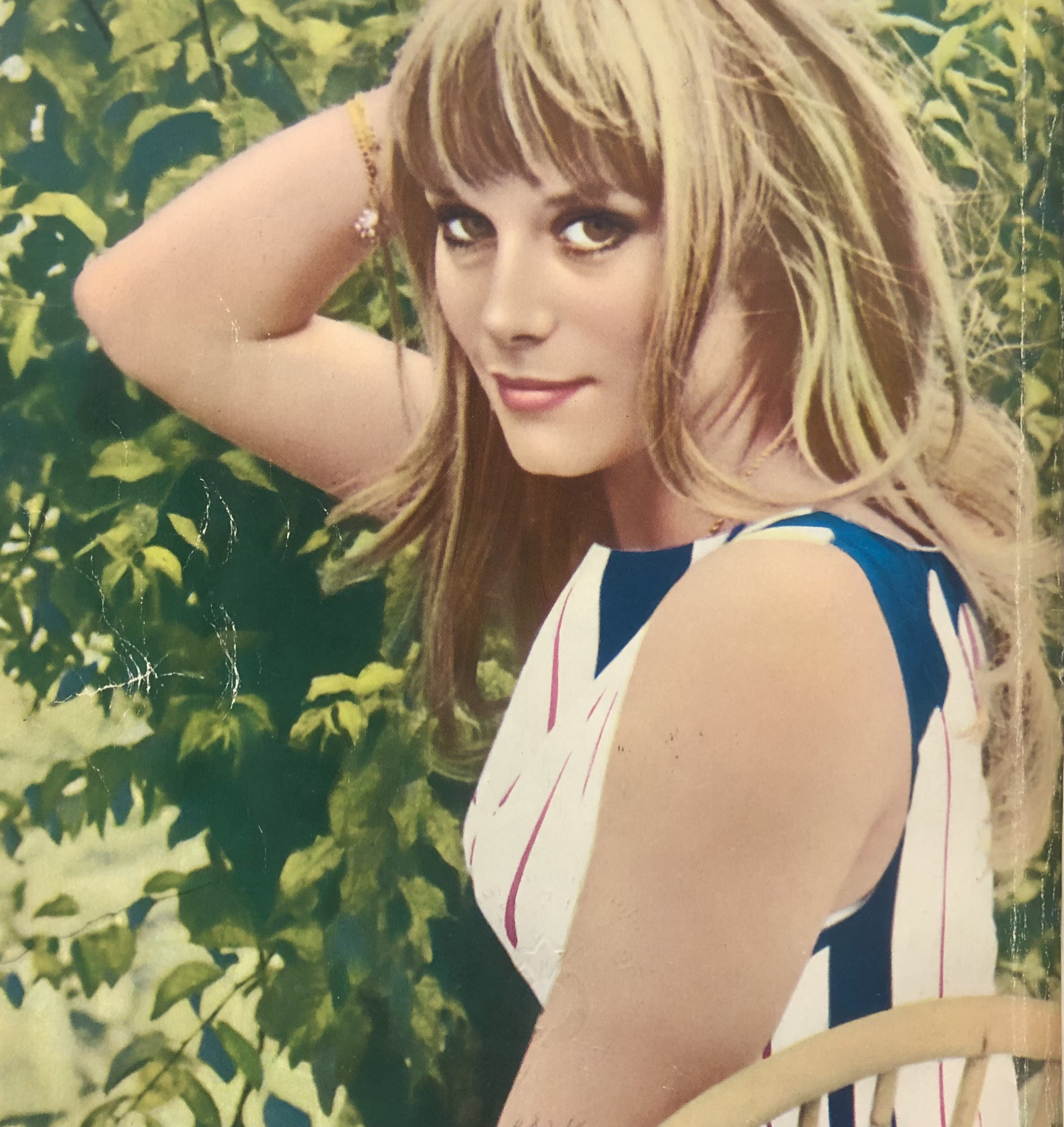
- Françoise Dorléac at 1964 Cannes Film Festival
- Born: Françoise Paulette Louise Dorléac; 21 March 1942; Paris, France
- Died: 26 June 1967 (aged 25); Villeneuve-Loubet, France
- Education: Conservatoire national supérieur d'art dramatique
- Occupation: Actress
- Years active: 1960–1967
- Parent(s): Maurice Dorléac; Renée Simonot
- Relatives: Catherine Deneuve (sister); Christian Vadim (nephew); Chiara Mastroianni (niece)

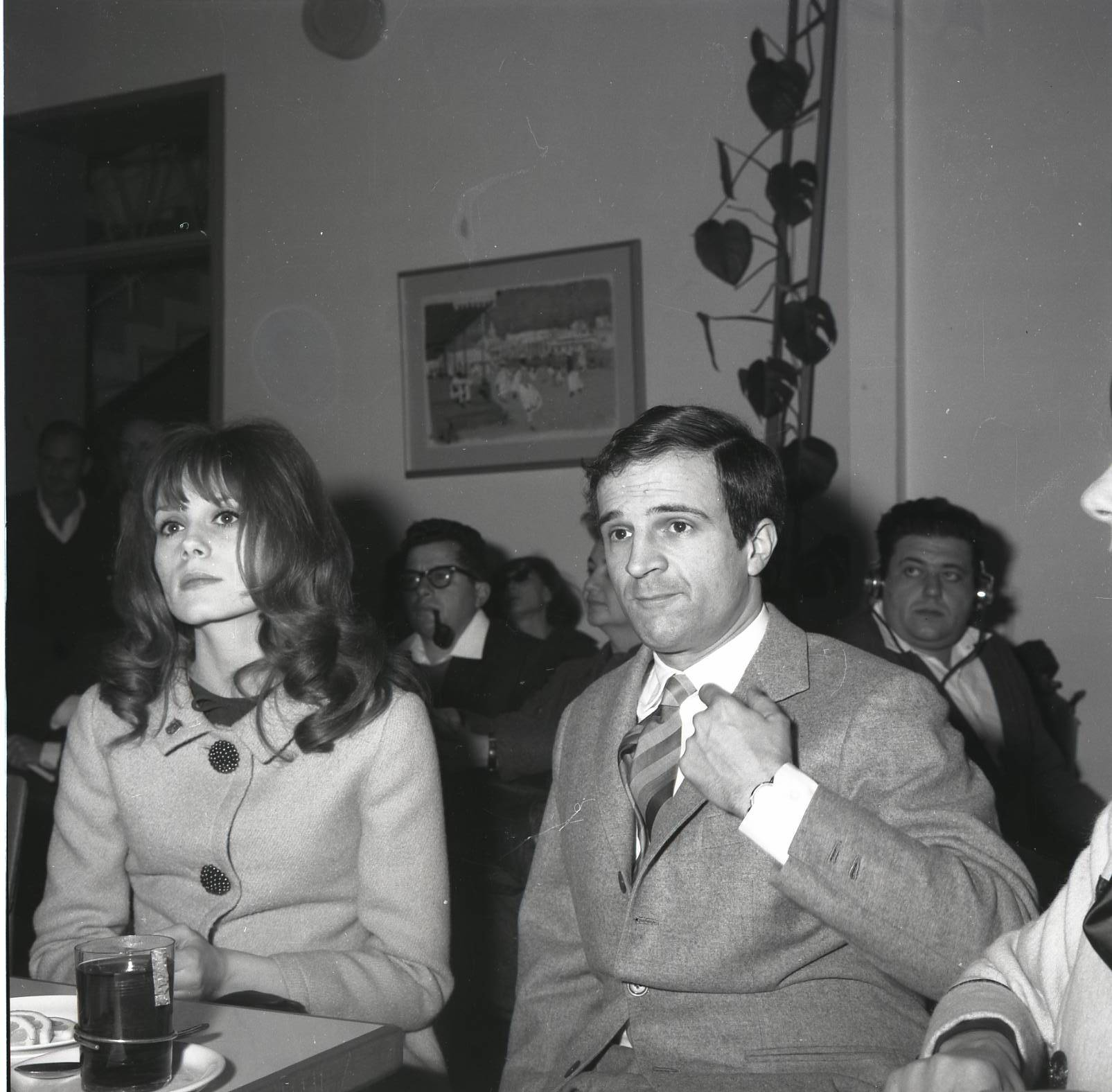
Dorléac with François Truffaut, during a visit to Israel, 1963

Françoise Paulette Louise Dorléac (French pronunciation: [fʁɑ̃swaz polɛt lwiz dɔʁleak]; 21 March 1942 – 26 June 1967) was a French actress. She was the elder sister of Catherine Deneuve, with whom she starred in the musical comedy film, The Young Girls of Rochefort (1967). Her other films include Philippe de Broca's That Man from Rio, François Truffaut's The Soft Skin (both 1964), Val Guest's Where the Spies Are (1965), and Roman Polanski's Cul-de-sac (1966).

== Biography ==
=== Early films ===
Dorléac was the daughter of screen actors Maurice Dorléac and Renée Simonot. Slim, fair and brunette, she modeled for Christian Dior and then made her film debut in The Wolves in the Sheepfold (1960), directed by Hervé Bromberger. She went on to appear in The Door Slams (1960) with Dany Saval and her sister Catherine Deneuve. Dorléac had a small role in Tonight or Never (1961) with Anna Karina for director Michel Deville, The Girl with the Golden Eyes (1961) with Marie Laforêt, All the Gold in the World (1961) with Bourvil, and Adorable Liar (1961) from director Deville.

Dorléac was Jean-Pierre Cassel's leading lady in The Dance (1962) and had one of the leads in a TV movie, Les trois chapeaux claques (1962), directed by Jean-Pierre Marchand.

She was reunited with Cassel in Arsène Lupin Versus Arsène Lupin (1962) and was one of many stars of the television movie Teuf-teuf (1963).

=== French stardom ===
Dorléac leapt to international stardom with the female lead in That Man from Rio (1964) starring Jean-Paul Belmondo and directed by Philippe de Broca. She followed it with The Soft Skin (1964) directed by François Truffaut.

She was in The Gentle Art of Seduction (1964) with Belmondo and Jean-Paul Brialy, with her sister in a support part. Dorléac was one of several French stars in Circle of Love (1964) directed by Roger Vadim, and appeared in a TV show, Les petites demoiselles (1964), directed by Deville and starring De Broca. She also appeared in the comedy films, Arsène Lupin Versus Arsène Lupin (1962) opposite Jean-Claude Brialy, and Male Hunt (1964), with Belmondo and her sister.

=== International career ===
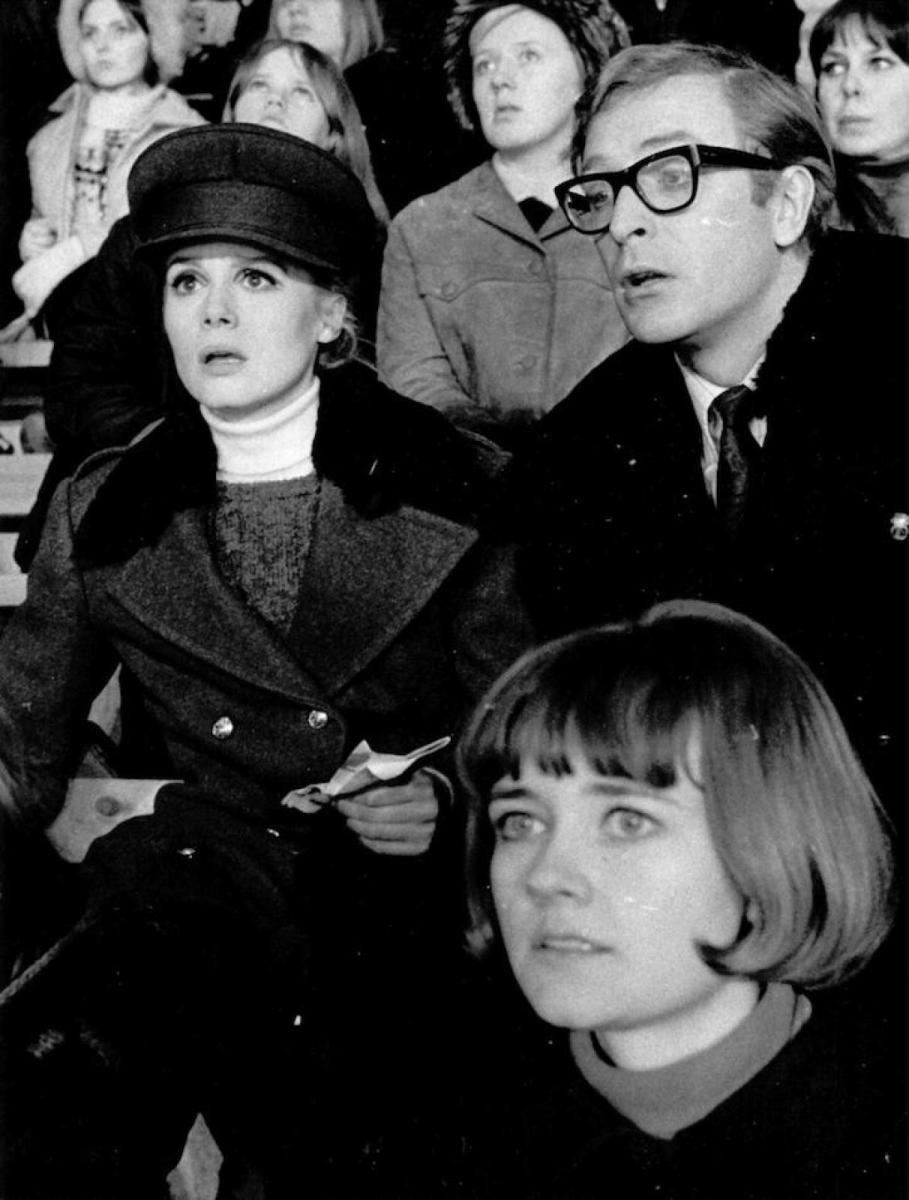
Dorléac and Michael Caine during the filming of Billion Dollar Brain at Helsinki Ice Hall, February 1967

That Man from Rio and Soft Skin were seen widely internationally and Dorléac received an offer to play the female lead in an expensive Hollywood financed epic, Genghis Khan (1965). She was David Niven's love interest in a spy film at MGM, Where the Spies Are (1966).

Dorléac appeared as the adulterous wife in Roman Polanski's black comedy Cul-de-sac (1966), shot in Britain. She returned to France to star in a TV adaption of the Prosper Mérimée novel Julie de Chaverny ou la Double Méprise (1966) directed by Marchand. Then she joined Gene Kelly and her sister Catherine, who was a cinematic star by this time, playing starstruck singing twins in The Young Girls of Rochefort (1967), an homage to Hollywood musicals.

Her final film role was the female lead in Billion Dollar Brain (1967) opposite Michael Caine, who played spy Harry Palmer.

== Personal life ==
Dorléac's parents were protective of her and her siblings, and well into adulthood she shared a bunk bed with her sister Catherine Deneuve in the family home, to which she regularly returned, according to Roger Vadim.

In December 1960, she met future co-star Jean-Pierre Cassel at the Épi-Club, a fashionable Montparnasse nightclub where she danced and partied with her younger sister, who also met Vadim there through mutual acquaintances. Cassel wrote in his 2004 autobiography that Dorléac had been the "love of his youth."

She was briefly the companion of François Truffaut in 1964, during and after the filming of the film La Peau Douce. This affair quickly turned into a friendship between the actress and the director, who affectionately called her "Framboise." (Raspberry).

In an interview with Libération, Guy Bedos, who also appears in Ce Soir ou Jamais by Michel Deville, evokes his missing relatives and significant others including her: "I had a fiancée, Françoise Dorléac. Since her death, I can no longer pass in front of the Louvre without seeing her."

Later she lived from 1965 to 1967 in an apartment at 159, boulevard Murat, in the 16th arrondissement of Paris, just opposite the building where she grew up and where her parents lived.

== Death ==
Dorléac was on the brink of international stardom when she died in a traffic accident on 26 June 1967, aged 25. She lost control of her rented Renault 10 and hit a signpost ten kilometres from Nice at the Villeneuve-Loubet exit of the autoroute La Provençale. The car flipped over in a field and burst into flames. Dorléac had been en route to Nice Côte d'Azur Airport after vacationing with Deneuve at Saint-Tropez and was afraid of missing her flight. She was pinned under the steering wheel and was seen struggling to get out of the car, but was unable to unbuckle her seat belt and open the door. Police later identified her body only from the fragment of a cheque book, a diary, and her driver's licence.

== Filmography ==
=== Feature films ===
- Les loups dans la bergerie (1960) – Madeleine
- Les portes claquent (1960) – Dominique (together with her sister Catherine Deneuve)
- Tonight or Never (1961) – Danièle
- The Girl with the Golden Eyes (1961) – Katia
- All the Gold in the World (1961) – La journaliste
- Adorable Liar (1962)
- The Dance (1962) – Françoise
- Arsène Lupin Versus Arsène Lupin (1962) – Nathalie Cartier
- That Man from Rio (1964) – Agnès Villermosa
- The Soft Skin (1964) – Nicole
- Circle of Love (1964)
- Male Hunt (1964) – Françoise Bicart alias Sandra Rossen
- Genghis Khan (1965) – Bortei
- Where the Spies Are (1966) – Vikki
- Cul-de-sac (1966) – Teresa
- The Young Girls of Rochefort (1967) – Solange Garnier (also with Deneuve)
- Billion Dollar Brain (1967) – Anya (final film role, released posthumously)

=== Television roles ===
- Les trois chapeaux claques (TV movie, 1962) – Paula
- Les petites demoiselles (TV movie, 1964) – Anne
- Julie de Chaverny ou la Double Méprise (TV movie, 1967) – Julie

=== Appearances as herself ===
- Cinépanorama (TV series documentary, 1959) – herself
- Les échos du cinéma (TV series short, 1961–1962) – herself
- Discorama (TV series, 1962) – herself
- Teuf-teuf (TV musical divertissement, 1963) – herself
- 4 FOIS D – Françoise Dorléac (Documentary short, 1964) – herself
- Grand écran (TV series documentary, 1964) – herself
- Ni figue ni raisin (TV series, 1965) – herself
- New Reports from France (TV series documentary, 1966) – herself, segment four
- Dim Dam Dom (TV series documentary, 1966) – herself
- Gala de l'Unicef (TV series, 1966) – herself
- Septième art septième case (TV series, 1966) – herself
- Derrière l'écran (TV series, 1966) – herself
- Tilt (TV series, 1967) – herself
- Hollywood in Deblatschka Pescara (Short film, 1967) – herself, uncredited
