= Love Torn in a Dream =

- Film poster
- Directed by: Raúl Ruiz
- Written by: Raúl Ruiz
- Produced by: Paulo Branco
- Starring: Melvil Poupaud; Elsa Zylberstein; Lambert Wilson
- Cinematography: Acácio de Almeida
- Edited by: Valeria Sarmiento
- Music by: Jorge Arriagada
- Distributed by: Le Petit Bureau
- Release date: 2000
- Running time: 123 minutes
- Countries: France; Portugal; Chile
- Languages: French; Portuguese; Spanish

Love Torn in a Dream (French: Combat d'amour en songe) is a 2000 metafictional film directed by Chilean filmmaker Raúl Ruiz. The film's nonlinear narrative spans nine interweaving stories, most of which take place in the 17th or 18th century, and feature characters such as pirates, nuns, young priests, a cannibal, a sultana, the Devil, and many more. To further complicate the already dizzying web of tales, many different characters are played by the same handful of actors across stories. This theme of the same individual portraying numerous identities extends beyond the limits of this one film (as many of Ruiz's themes do) and can be viewed in the larger context of Ruiz's work: for instance, lead actor Melvil Poupaud has been in several of Ruiz's films since his childhood. In 1983, at the age of ten, he starred in Ruiz's City of Pirates and went on to act in The Insomniac on the Bridge (1985), Treasure Island (1985), Three Lives and Only One Death (1996), Genealogies of a Crime (1997) and Mysteries of Lisbon (2010).

Shot in Sintra (where Ruiz had made The Territory almost 20 years previously) and produced by Gemini Films, Madroga Filmes, Canal+ and Radiotelevisao Portuguesa, among others, Love Torn in a Dream premiered in August 2000 at the Montreal World Film Festival where it won a FIPRESCI Prize. From there, it went on to be released in France in November 2000, in Portugal in May 2001, in the Netherlands in January 2002 at the International Film Festival Rotterdam, and in Poland in October 2002 at the Warsaw Film Festival.

== Plot ==
The film begins in black and white with a self-aware narrated scene of Love Torn Within a Dream, where producer Paulo Branco welcomes the cast at a celebratory ceremony. The film quickly establishes that there are nine interwoven stories that will be depicted throughout the film. This is aided by an illustrated configuration on a chalkboard that explicitly references the theories of Ramon Lull's ars combinatoria - an artistic preoccupation of Ruiz. Through overlapping threads and exchanged objects, these nine stories form twelve supposed stories in total, although the situation becomes increasingly convoluted as the film progresses.

Several actors play different characters across the storylines and centuries. For instance, Elsa Zylberstein portrays both Lucrezia, a nun-turned mystical nymph, and modern-day Jessica, who interacts with Paul, a student disturbed by a website predicting his future. Similarly, Melvil Poupaud plays both Paul, the troubled young Catholic who discovers he is Jewish, and a character named Jacques, a Protestant theologian. Many other actors also portray different characters in various roles throughout the film.

The film explores themes such as a young theology student grappling with doubts over institutional ideologies and hypocrisy, the dangerous power of storytelling, shifting and self-proclaimed denial of identities, as well as piracy, charmed objects that act upon the bearers, maps, and cannibalism, all typical of Ruiz's work.

== Cast ==
- Melvil Poupaud as Paul, the young priest, doubting twin brothers
- Elsa Zylberstein as Lucrezia, Jessica, the sultana
- Lambert Wilson as Sebatol, pirate
- Christian Vadim as David, pirate thief
- Marie-France Pisier as mother, married woman
- Rogerio Samora as Baniel, pirate
- Diogo Dória as Mariani, painter, father

== Reception ==
Variety identified it as "witty diversion for upscale auds," perhaps hinting at the lofty, enigmatic narrative games it plays, praised it as "another sly, spry intellectual game", but complained about the excessive length of the film. Les Inrockuptibles found it impossible to summarize, and suggested it was a kind of self-parody of Ruiz's earlier films. Dennis Schwartz, of Ozus' World Movie Reviews, gave this "idiosyncratic film" a B− on Rotten Tomatoes, and described it as "an acting exercise to show-off the film-makers rich imagination."

Love Torn in a Dream won the FIPRESCI Prize (International Press Award) in Montreal World Film Festival.

== Soundtrack ==
Jorge Arriagada composed the music and score of this film. He has worked with Ruiz on forty-four different films since their first collaboration on Ruiz's 1977 Colloque de chiens. Arriagada is the youngest composer to have won a Guggenheim fellowship, which he did at age 29 in 1972.

== See also ==
- Ramon Lull
- Art of memory
- List of nonlinear narrative films
