= Antoine Rault =

French playwright and novelist (born 1965)

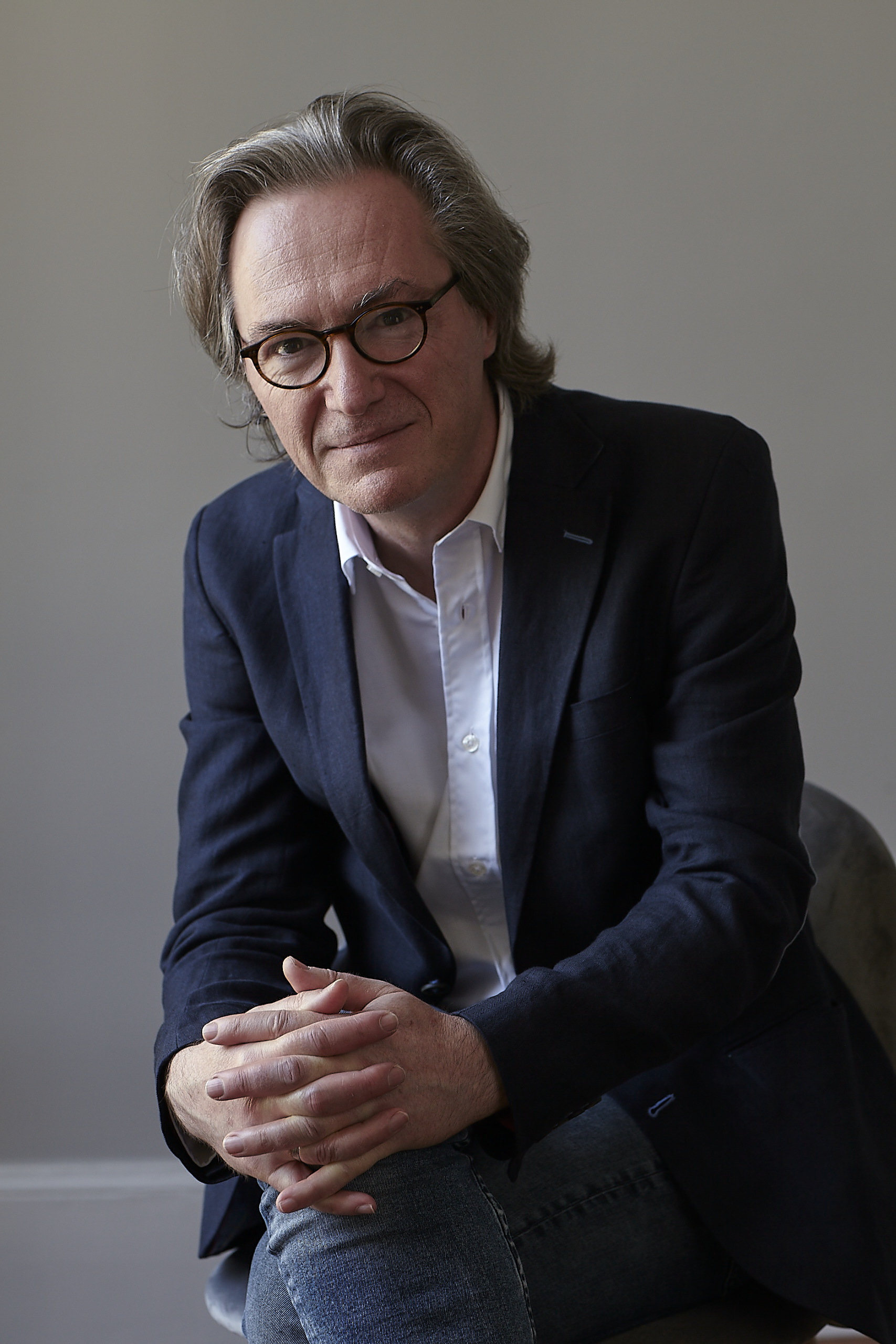
écrivain et auteur de théâtre français Antoine Rault, 2020

Antoine Rault (born 28 September 1965) is a French playwright and novelist.

The website - https://www.antoine-rault.com/

The YouTube channel - https://www.youtube.com/@Antoine-Rault

Rault's works deal with contemporary and historical themes.

He was awarded the Grand Prix de l’Académie française for his play Le Caïman about Marxist philosopher Louis Althusser, who killed his wife after 30 years of marriage.

== Biography ==
Antoine Rault was born in Paris. In 1967, he graduated from the Institut d’Etudes Politiques de Paris, where he studied literature and politics.

Subsequently, Antoine Rault worked for 15 years as a ghostwriter for the chairman of an international company and several French politicians. He was also a public relations advisor for a French minister.

Although his first play La Première Tête, which deals with the French king Louis XVI and the beginning of the French Revolution, had been performed in 1989, Antoine Rault had to wait until the success of his second play, Le Caïman, to become a full-time writer.

== Works ==
=== Novels ===
- Je veux que tu m’aimes (Albin Michel) 2010.
- La vie dont tu rêvais (Albin Michel) 2014.
- La danse des vivants (Éditions Albin Michel) 2016, La Grande Librairie.Prix Maurice Genevoix 2017
- La traversée du paradis (Éditions Albin Michel) 2018.
- L'espion idéal (le Livre de Poche) 2020.
- De grandes ambitions (Éditions Albin Michel) 2020.
- Monsieur Sénégal (Plon) 2022.
- L'angle mort du destin (Fayard) 2025.
- L'homme qui était heureux sans le savoir (Éditions Pauvert) 2026.

=== Theater Plays ===
- La Première Tête (1989) - Comédie de Paris.
- Le Caïman (2005- 2007) - Théâtre Montparnasse, with Claude Rich. Published by Avant-Scène Théâtre.
- Le Diable Rouge (2008- 2010) - Théâtre Montparnasse, with Claude Rich. Published by Avant-Scène Théâtre.
- Le Démon de Hannah (2009) - Comédie des Champs-Elysées. Published by Editions Albin Michel.
- La Vie sinon Rien (2009-2011). Comédie des Champs-Elysées. Published by Quatre Vents – l’Avant-Scène Théâtre.
- L'Intrus (2011- 2012) - Comédie des Champs-Elysées, with Claude Rich Published by Editions Albin Michel.
- Le Système (2015) - Théâtre Antoine, with Lorant Deutsch, Stéphane Guillon, Eric Metayer, Urbain Cancellier, Sophie Barjac, Marie Bunel, Stéphanie Caillol, Philippine Bataille. Published by Editions Albin Michel
- Toi et tes rêves - creation for the Festival d'Avignon 2015, with Stéphanie Vicat and Gérôme Anger.
- Un nouveau départ - creation for the Festival d'Avignon 2015, with Corinne Touzet and Christian Vadim. Previous creations abroad - Russia (Всё сначала, 2011) and Germany (Auf ein Neues, 2012, with Marion Kracht and Daniel Morgenroth). 2016 - Théâtre des Variétés with Corinne Touzet, Christian Vadim and Fanny Guillot. Published by Editions Albin Michel
- La vie rêvée d'Helen Cox (2018) - Théâtre La Bruyière, with Christelle Reboul and Jean-Pierre Mickael. Published by Editions Albin Michel
- Terminus (2018) - CADO d'Orléans, with Lorant Deutsch, Bernard Malaka, Maxime d'Aboville, Chloe Berthier, Valérie Alane. Published by Editions Albin Michel
- Au Scalpel (2022) - Festival d'Avignon and Théâtre des Variétés, with Davy Sardou and Bruno Salomone. Published by L'Avant-scène

== Awards ==
=== Le Caïman ===
Grand prix de l’Académie française 2006. Five Molière Award nominations in 2006, including Best Play

=== Le Diable Rouge ===
Two Molière Awards in 2009. Seven Molière Award nominations in 2009, including Best Play and Best Dramatist. Nomination Globes de Cristal 2009

=== Le Démon de Hannah ===
Nomination Globes de Cristal 2010. Molière Award nomination 2010.

=== Le Système ===
Three Molière Award nominations 2015

=== La danse des vivants ===
Prix Maurice-Genevoix 2017
