= Tonight or Never =

Tonight or Never may refer to:

- Tonight or Never (1931 film), a 1931 American film
- Tonight or Never (1941 film), a 1941 Swedish comedy film
- Tonight or Never (1961 film), a 1961 French film
