= The Doctor's Horrible Experiment =

1959 French television film

- Based on: Strange Case of Dr Jekyll and Mr Hyde by Robert Louis Stevenson
- Written by: Jean Renoir
- Directed by: Jean Renoir
- Starring: Jean-Louis Barrault; Teddy Bilis; Michel Vitold; Jean Topart; Micheline Gary
- Music by: Joseph Kosma
- Country of origin: France
- Original language: French

Production
- Cinematography: Georges Leclerc
- Editor: Renée Lichtig
- Running time: 95 minutes
- Production companies: R.T.F.; S.O.F.I.RA.D

Original release
- Release: August 31, 1959

The Doctor's Horrible Experiment (French: Le Testament du docteur Cordelier) is a 1959 French black-and-white television film directed by Jean Renoir. It has been released in the United Kingdom as Experiment in Evil and on DVD as The Testament of Doctor Cordelier. The film is a retelling of the 1886 novella Strange Case of Dr Jekyll and Mr Hyde by Robert Louis Stevenson set in 1950s France. Jean-Louis Barrault plays Dr. Cordelier/Opale, the substitute for Dr. Jekyll/Hyde character; the film is also known for its visual style that is far above the normal television programs of the 1950s.

== Plot summary ==
In Paris, the lawyer Joly is given the will of his friend and client Cordelier, a well-known psychiatrist, who leaves everything to a patient called Opale. However Joly learns that this Opale is a sadistic pervert and murderer who keeps evading the police. He even causes the death of another leading psychiatrist, Séverin, who challenged Cordelier's views. The climax comes after a smart party at Cordelier's capacious house, when he is heard howling with pain in his laboratory. Breaking in, Joly finds Opale, who admits he is really Cordelier and makes his confession. Guilt over his sexual exploitation of female staff and patients led him, by long research into mind-altering drugs, to create a separate persona through which he could enact his hidden desires without taking responsibility. Swallowing an overdose, he dies.

== Cast ==
- Jean-Louis Barrault as Dr. Cordelier/Opale
- Teddy Bilis as Maître Joly
- Jean Bertho as Premier passant
- Jacques Ciron as Deuxième passant
- Jean Topart as Désiré
- Michel Vitold as Docteur Séverin
- Jacques Danoville as Commissaire Lardaut (as Jacques Dannoville)
- André Certes as Inspecteur Salbris

== Reception ==
On Rotten Tomatoes, the film holds an approval rating of 100% based on 6 reviews, with a weighted average rating of 7.7/10.

Author and film critic Leonard Maltin awarded the film three out of a possible four stars, praising Barrault's performance, and direction.
