= Victoria (2008 film) =

2008 film

- Directed by: Anna Karina
- Written by: Anna Karina
- Produced by: Hejer Charf
- Starring: Anna Karina
- Cinematography: Philippe Lavalette
- Edited by: Mathieu Arsenault
- Music by: Philippe Katerine
- Distributed by: Nadja Productions
- Release date: 4 October 2008 (Pusan International Film Festival)
- Running time: 95 minutes
- Countries: France; Canada
- Language: French

Victoria is a 2008 French-Canadian road movie directed by and starring Anna Karina in her last film role before her death a little over a decade after it was released.

== Cast ==
- Anna Karina
- Jean-François Moran
- Louis Woodson
- Emmanuel Reichenbach
- Sylvie de Morais-Nogueira
- Sophie Desmarais
