= Renée Simonot =

French actress and voice artist (1911–2021)

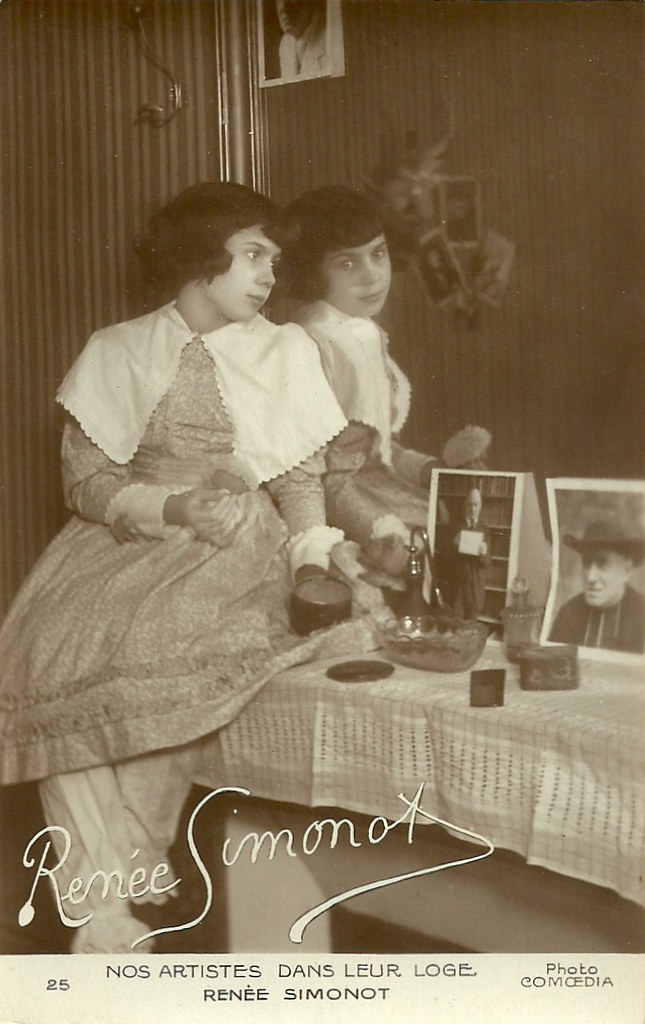
- Renée Simonot, 1920s
- Born: Jeanne Renée Deneuve; 10 September 1911; Le Havre, France
- Died: 11 July 2021 (aged 109); Paris, France
- Occupations: Stage actress; voice artist; film actress
- Years active: 1918–2001
- Spouse: Maurice Dorléac (m. 1940; died 1979)
- Children: 4, including Françoise Dorléac and Catherine Deneuve
- Relatives: Christian Vadim (grandson); Chiara Mastroianni (granddaughter)

Jeanne Renée Deneuve (French pronunciation: [ʒan ʁəne dənœv]; 10 September 1911 – 11 July 2021), known professionally as Renée-Jeanne Simonot ([ʁəne ʒan simɔno]), was a French actress and voice artist. Partially Italian, she was married to actor Maurice Dorléac, the mother of actresses Catherine Deneuve and Françoise Dorléac and the grandmother of actor Christian Vadim and actress Chiara Mastroianni.

== Early life and career ==
Born in Le Havre, France to Joseph-Sévère Deneuve and Antoinette-Jeanne Deneuve (née Schenardi), she debuted at the Odéon Theatre in 1918 at the age of seven. Primarily a stage actress, she remained there for 28 years, holding the post of "leading lady". Her daughter Catherine chose to use her maiden name, Deneuve, as her stage name. Simonot is Renée's stage name, which she took from an opera singer and family friend.

Renée Simonot was one of the first French actresses to begin the dubbing of American films in France from the beginning of the talkies in 1929 through the 1930s. She was the voice of Olivia de Havilland (in most of her films), Sylvia Sidney, Judy Garland, Donna Reed and Esther Williams, among others.

== Personal life ==
She had her first daughter, Danièle, out of wedlock on 27 October 1936 with actor Aimé Clariond. Simonot told Le Point magazine in 2013: "Mr. Clariond was not my husband. He was married, not divorced and separated from his wife for a long time. The only happiness he gave me is a child. For the rest, he was charming, but we could not count on him."

While dubbing for MGM, she met Maurice Dorléac and they married in 1940. The couple had three daughters: Françoise (1942–1967), Catherine (born 22 October 1943) and Sylvie (born 14 December 1946).

Simonot had been a widow since 1979 and lived in Paris. In an interview conducted a few months before her 102nd birthday in 2013, she said: "My old age is not sad. I am lucky to be very surrounded. There is not a day where I don't get a phone call or a visit from my children and grandchildren."

In 2019, ahead of her 108th birthday, daughter Catherine told Gala: "It's pretty amazing, it comes from her genes. My sisters and I are holding her. She has been in a home for two or three years. At the same time it's a little scary, it still seems very far in life. I am all the more surprised by her longevity that she is not sick."

Simonot died in Paris in July 2021 at the age of 109.

== Selected stage work ==
- 1921: Les Misérables (Cosette) by Paul Meurice and Charles Hugo based on the novel by Victor Hugo, Odéon Theatre
- 1922: Molière by Henry Dupuy-Mazuel and Jean-José Frappa, directed by Firmin Gémier, Odéon Theatre
- 1928: La Belle Aventure by Gaston Arman de Caillavet, Robert de Flers and Étienne Rey, Odéon Theatre
- 1932: Le Favori by Martial Piéchaud, Odéon Theatre
- 1934: Jeanne d'Arc by Saint-Georges de Bouhélier, Odéon Theatre

== See also ==
- List of centenarians (actors, filmmakers and entertainers)
