= Vivre ensemble =

1973 film

- Directed by: Anna Karina
- Written by: Anna Karina
- Produced by: Anna Karina
- Starring: Anna Karina
- Release date: 1973
- Running time: 93 minutes
- Country: France
- Language: French

Vivre ensemble is a 1973 French drama film written, directed by and starring Anna Karina. It was Karina's directorial debut.

== Cast ==
- Bob Asklöf
- Jean Aurel
- Lynn Berkley as Johnny
- Viviane Blassel
- Danny Brown
- Gilles Exbrayat
- Philippe Exbrayat
- Anna Karina as Julie Andersen
- Michel Lancelot
- Raphael Mattei
- Monique Morelli as La Concierge
- Gérard Pereira
