= Warren Beatty: Mister Hollywood =

- Written by: Olivier Nicklaus
- Directed by: Olivier Nicklaus
- Starring: Warren Beatty
- Narrated by: Chiara Mastroianni
- Theme music composer: Carl Davis
- Original language: English

Production
- Producer: David Berdah
- Editor: Thibaut Sève
- Running time: 53 minutes
- Production companies: Arte France; AVROTROS; Ciné; Slow Production

Original release
- Release: October 4, 2015

Warren Beatty: Mister Hollywood (French title: Warren Beatty, une obsession hollywoodienne) is a French-Dutch documentary film directed by Olivier Nicklaus. The world premiere took place on October 4, 2015.

== Plot ==
The center of attention — Hollywood actor, director, screenwriter, producer, first-class playboy and even a candidate for U.S. President Warren Beatty.
