= Melvil Poupaud =

French actor (born 1973)

- Poupaud in 2006
- Born: Melvil Matthias Julien Poupaud; 26 January 1973 (age 53); Paris, France
- Occupations: Actor; writer; director
- Years active: 1983–present
- Spouse: Georgina Tacou (m. 1999, divorced)
- Children: 1
- Mother: Chantal Poupaud

Melvil Matthias Julien Poupaud (born 26 January 1973) is a French actor.

== Early life ==
Poupaud was born in Paris, the son of Michel Poupaud and filmmaker Chantal Poupaud. He has an elder brother, Yarol, who is a musician.

== Career ==
Poupaud made his film debut at the age of 10 in Raúl Ruiz's City of Pirates (1983), having been introduced to the director by his mother. He subsequently appeared in nine more of Ruiz's films, including The Insomniac on the Bridge (1985), Treasure Island (1986), Genealogies of a Crime (1997), Time Regained (1999) and Love Torn in a Dream (2000). For his roles in Jacques Doillon's The 15 Year Old Girl (1989) and Laurence Ferreira Barbosa's Normal People Are Nothing Exceptional (1993), Poupaud received two nominations for the César Award for Most Promising Actor.

He starred in François Ozon's Time to Leave, and co-starred with Parker Posey in Zoe Cassavetes' Broken English.

He also appeared in films such as Eric Rohmer's A Summer's Tale, Arnaud Desplechin's A Christmas Tale, and François Ozon's The Refuge.

He co-starred with Suzanne Clément in Xavier Dolan's Laurence Anyways.

== Personal life ==
Poupaud dated actress Chiara Mastroianni for four years from the age of 16 to 20. Though the two split up they remained friends and collaborators for decades with Mastroianni crediting Poupaud with encouraging her to pursue acting as a career and Poupaud crediting Mastroianni for his friendship with her former husband Benjamin Biolay.

Poupaud was previously married to writer Georgina Tacou, with whom he has a daughter.

== Filmography ==
=== As actor ===
Year	Title	Role	Notes
1983	City of Pirates	Malo	
1984	Qui es-tu Johnny Mac ?	Johnny Mac	Short (also as director and screenwriter)
1985	Treasure Island	Jim Hawkins	
1985	The Insomniac on the Bridge	Michel	
1985	Ces jours où les remords font vraiment mal au cœur	The boy	Short (also as director and screenwriter)
1986	Dans un miroir		
1988	3 jours...	Melvil	Short (also as director and screenwriter)
1989	The 15 Year Old Girl	Thomas	Nominated - César Award for Most Promising Actor
1992	Archipel	Michel	
1992	The Lover	The Younger Brother	
1993	À la belle étoile	Mathieu	
1993	Les gens normaux n'ont rien d'exceptionnel	Germain	Also as composer Nominated - César Award for Most Promising Actor
1994	Fado majeur et mineur	Antoine	
1994	Boulevard Mac Donald		Short (also as director, screenwriter and composer)
1995	Élisa	Pharmacist's Son	
1995	Innocent Lies	Louis Bernard	
1995	Those Were the Days	Axel	
1995	Hillbilly Chainsaw Massacre		Short
1995	La Vie de Marianne	Valville	TV movie
1995	3000 scénarios contre un virus		TV series (1 episode)
1996	Souvenir	Charles	
1996	A Summer's Tale	Gaspard	
1996	Le journal du séducteur	Gregoire	
1996	Three Lives and Only One Death	Martin	
1997	Marianne	Valville	
1997	Le ciel est à nous	Lenny	
1997	Genealogies of a Crime	René	
1998	Les kidnappeurs	Armand Carpentier	
1999	Time Regained	Prince de Foix	
1999	Quelque chose	The man	Short (also as director, screenwriter and cinematographer)
2000	A Raiz do Coração	Vicente Corvo	
2000	La Chambre obscure	Bertrand	
2000	Love Torn in a Dream	Paul	
2001	A Hell of a Day	Ben	
2001	Rémi	Rémi	Short (also as director and screenwriter)
2003	Feelings	François	
2003	Le Divorce	Charles-Henri de Persand	
2003	Shimkent hôtel	Alex	
2003	Pronobis	Philippe	Short (also as director and screenwriter)
2004	Eros thérapie	Bruno	
2004	Monde extérieur	Régis	Short
2004	Qui a tué Johnny Mac ?	Johnny Mac	Short (also as director, screenwriter and cinematographer)
2005	Time to Leave	Romain	Valladolid International Film Festival - Best Actor
2006	Melvil	Melvil	Also as director, screenwriter, cinematographer and editor
2007	A Lost Man	Thomas Koré	
2007	Towards Zero	Guillaume Neuville	
2007	Broken English	Julien	
2008	The Broken	Stefan Chambers	
2008	Speed Racer	Johnny 'Goodboy' Jones	
2008	A Christmas Tale	Ivan Vuillard	
2008	Crime Is Our Business	Frédéric Charpentier	
2009	The Refuge	Louis	
2009	Lucky Luke	Jesse James	
2009	44 Inch Chest	Loverboy	San Diego Film Critics Society Award for Best Performance by an Ensemble
2010	La lisière	François	
2010	Black Heaven	Vincent	
2010	Mysteries of Lisbon	Colonel Ernesto Lacroze	
2010	The Counterfeiters	Edouard	TV movie
2011	L'orpheline avec en plus un bras en moins	Robinson	
2011	The Argument	Man	Short
2012	Laurence Anyways	Laurence Alia	Lisbon & Estoril Film Festival - Best Actor; Nominated - Canadian Screen Award for Best Actor; Nominated - Vancouver Film Critics Circle Award for Best Actor in a Canadian Film
2012	Lines of Wellington	Marechal Massena	
2014	Fidelio: Alice's Odyssey	Gaël	
2015	Mad Love	The Priest	
2015	Face Down	Samy	
2015	By the Sea	François	
2015	The Great Game	Pierre Blum	
2016	In Bed with Victoria	Vincent Kossarski	Nominated — César Award for Best Supporting Actor
2017	The Lady in the Portrait	Jean Denis Attiret	
2017	La pimbêche à vélo	Melvil	Short
2018	La belle et la belle	Marc	
2018	By the Grace of God	Alexandre Guérin	Nominated — César Award for Best Actor
2018	Les grands squelettes		
2018	Insoupçonnable	Paul Brodsky	TV series (10 episodes); Nominated - ACS Award for Best Actor
2019	Golden Youth	Hubert Robert	
2019	J'accuse	Maître Labori	
2020	Summer of 85	M. Lefèvre	
2021–2022	UFOs	Didier Mathure	TV series (24 episodes); ACS Award for Best Actor (2021); Nominated - ACS Award for Best Actor (2022)
2022	Brother and Sister	Louis	
2022	One Fine Morning	Clément	
2023	Jeanne du Barry	Le Comte du Barry	
2023	Just the Two of Us	Grégoire	
2023	Coup de chance	Jean	
2025-2026	Privileges	Édouard Balzaim	HBO TV series
2026	One Minute to Midnight	Léo	

=== As filmmaker ===
Year	Title	Credited as			Notes
Year	Title	Director	Writer	Cinematographer	Notes
1984	Qui es-tu Johnny Mac ?	Yes	Yes	No	Short
1985	Ces jours où les remords font vraiment mal au cœur	Yes	Yes	No	Short
1988	3 jours…	Yes	Yes	No	Short
1994	Boulevard Mac Donald	Yes	Yes	No	Short (also as composer)
1999	Quelque chose	Yes	Yes	Yes	Short
2001	Rémi	Yes	Yes	No	Short
2003	Pronobis	Yes	Yes	No	Short
2004	Qui a tué Johnny Mac ?	Yes	Yes	Yes	Short
2006	Melvil	Yes	Yes	Yes	Also as editor

== Bibliography ==
Melvil Poupaud, Quel est Mon noM, Paris, Éditions Stock, coll. « La Bleue », 7 septembre 2011, 288 p. (ISBN 978-2-23407-030-1).

== Other awards ==
- 1998: Berlin International Film Festival – Shooting Stars Award
