= Claude Rich =

French actor (1929–2017)

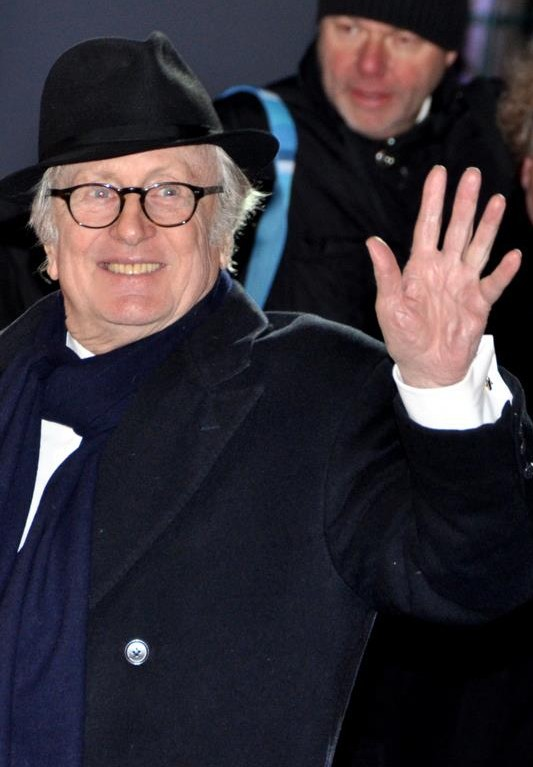
- Rich at the 38th César Awards
- Born: 8 February 1929; Strasbourg, France
- Died: 20 July 2017 (aged 88); Orgeval, France
- Occupations: Actor, screenwriter
- Years active: 1951–2015
- Spouse: Catherine Renaudin

Claude Rich (French pronunciation: [klod ʁiʃ]; 8 February 1929 – 20 July 2017) was a French stage and screen actor. He began his career in theater before his film debut in 1955.

== Personal life ==
He married actress Catherine Renaudin on 26 June 1959. They had two daughters, Delphine and Nathalie, and a son, Remy.

== Career ==
In 1996, he was a member of the jury at the 46th Berlin International Film Festival.

== Filmography ==
| Year | Title | Role | Director | Notes |
|---|---|---|---|---|
| 1955 | The Grand Maneuver | Alice's fiancé | René Clair | |
| 1956 | Le revizor ou L'inspecteur général | Khlestakov | Marcel Bluwal | TV movie |
| 1956 | It Happened in Aden | Price | Michel Boisrond | |
| 1956 | Mitsou | Lieutenant Kaki | Jacqueline Audry | |
| 1957 | La garçonne | Delmarre | Jacqueline Audry (2) | |
| 1957 | La polka des menottes | Pierrot | Raoul André | |
| 1958 | Neither Seen Nor Recognized | Amédée Fléchard | Yves Robert | |
| 1958 | Ligne de vie | The Man | Jean Leduc | Short |
| 1960 | Un beau dimanche de septembre | Lustra | Marcel Cravenne | TV movie |
| 1960 | Coctail party | Alex | Jean Vernier | |
| 1960 | Love and the Frenchwoman | Charles | René Clair (2) | (segment "Mariage, Le") |
| 1960 | L'homme à femmes | Inspector Vaillant | Jacques-Gérard Cornu | |
| 1960 | Les joueurs | Glov Fils | Marcel Bluwal (2) | TV movie |
| 1961 | Tonight or Never | Laurent | Michel Deville | |
| 1961 | All the Gold in the World | Fred | René Clair (3) | |
| 1962 | The Burning Court | Stéphane Desgrez | Julien Duvivier | |
| 1962 | The Seven Deadly Sins | Armand | Claude Chabrol | (segment "Avarice, L'") |
| 1962 | Girl on the Road | The 30 year old Man | Jacqueline Audry (3) | |
| 1962 | The Elusive Corporal | Ballochet | Jean Renoir | |
| 1962 | Le Diable et les Dix Commandements | The Devil | Julien Duvivier (2) | Voice, Uncredited |
| 1962 | Copacabana Palace | Buby von Raunacher | Steno | |
| 1962 | Le théâtre de la jeunesse | The ghost | Marcel Cravenne (2) | TV series, 1 episode |
| 1963 | La chasse ou L'amour ravi | Lucinio | Alain Boudet | TV movie |
| 1963 | Les Tontons flingueurs | Antoine Delafoy | Georges Lautner | |
| 1964 | Constance aux enfers | Student | François Villiers | |
| 1964 | How Do You Like My Sister? | François Lorin | Michel Boisrond (2) | |
| 1964 | Champagne for Savages | Claude | Christian-Jaque | |
| 1964 | Male Hunt | Julien Brenot | Édouard Molinaro | |
| 1964 | Mata Hari, Agent H21 | Julien the Driver | Jean-Louis Richard | |
| 1965 | Les copains | Huchon | Yves Robert (2) | |
| 1965 | The Apollo of Bellac | Monsieur de Bellac | Gilbert Pineau | TV movie |
| 1965 | Diamonds Are Brittle | Bernard Noblet | Nicolas Gessner | |
| 1965 | The Duke's Gold | Ludovic de Talois-Minet | Jacques Baratier | |
| 1966 | Paris brûle-t-il? | General Leclerc | René Clément | |
| 1966 | Mona, l'étoile sans nom | Miroiu | Henri Colpi | |
| 1966 | Le vampire de Bougival | | Philippe Ducrest | TV movie |
| 1966 | Monsieur le Président Directeur Général | Stéphane Bévin | Jean Girault | |
| 1967 | Les compagnons de la marguerite | Jean-Louis Matouzec | Jean-Pierre Mocky | |
| 1967 | Oscar | Christian Martin | Édouard Molinaro (2) | |
| 1968 | The Bride Wore Black | Bliss | François Truffaut | |
| 1968 | Je t'aime, je t'aime | Claude Ridder | Alain Resnais | San Sebastián International Film Festival - Best Actor |
| 1969 | A Golden Widow | Antoine Berger | Michel Audiard | |
| 1970 | Con quale amore, con quanto amore | André | Pasquale Festa Campanile | |
| 1970 | The Customer of the Off Season | The Customer | Moshé Mizrahi | |
| 1970 | Ninì Tirabusciò: la donna che inventò la mossa | Paolo di Sergeno | Marcello Fondato | |
| 1973 | Les cent livres des hommes | The Narrator | Maurice Dugowson | TV series, 1 episode |
| 1974 | La femme de Jean | Jean | Yannick Bellon | |
| 1974 | Creezy | Dominique | Pierre Granier-Deferre | |
| 1974 | The Irony of Chance | Morin | Édouard Molinaro (3) | |
| 1974 | Stavisky | Inspector Bonny | Alain Resnais (2) | |
| 1975 | Le futur aux trousses | Borel | Dolorès Grassian | |
| 1975 | The French Detective | Judge Delmesse | Pierre Granier-Deferre (2) | |
| 1975 | Monsieur Jadis | Monsieur Jadis | Michel Polac | TV movie |
| 1977 | Le Crabe-tambour | Pierre | Pierre Schoendoerffer | |
| 1979 | The Police War | Commissioner Ballestrat | Robin Davis | |
| 1980 | Orient-Express | Wiesner | Bruno Gantillon | TV miniseries |
| 1981 | La revanche | Jacques Beaufort | Pierre Lary | |
| 1982 | Un matin rouge | Léonard | Jean-Jacques Aublanc | |
| 1982 | Fausses notes | Eric Thoreau | Peter Kassovitz | TV movie |
| 1982 | L'ours en peluche | Professor Jean Chabot | Edouard Logereau | TV movie |
| 1982 | Un habit pour l'hiver | Simon | Pierre Badel | TV movie |
| 1983 | Dans la citadelle | Doctor Barrois | Peter Kassovitz (2) | TV movie |
| 1983 | Maria Chapdelaine | Monk Cordelier | Gilles Carle | |
| 1983 | Les mots pour le dire | Guillaume Talbiac | José Pinheiro | |
| 1985 | Escalier C | Forster's father | Jean-Charles Tacchella | |
| 1985 | L'énigme blanche | Maxence | Peter Kassovitz (3) | TV movie |
| 1988 | Haute tension | Alex | Denys Granier-Deferre | TV series, 1 episode |
| 1989 | Les cigognes n'en font qu'à leur tête | Sam | Didier Kaminka | |
| 1989 | La piovra | Filippo Rasi | Luigi Perelli | TV miniseries |
| 1989 | Le grand secret | Samuel Frend | Jacques Trébouta | TV miniseries |
| 1989 | France images d'une révolution | The Narrator | Alec R. Costandinos | Short |
| 1990 | Promotion canapé | Ivan | Didier Kaminka (2) | |
| 1990 | Stirn et Stern | Ferdinand Stirn | Peter Kassovitz (4) | TV movie |
| 1992 | The Accompanist | The Minister | Claude Miller | |
| 1992 | The Supper | Talleyrand | Édouard Molinaro (4) | César Award for Best Actor |
| 1993 | La vérité en face | Paul Noblet | Étienne Périer | TV movie |
| 1993 | Commissaire Dumas d'Orgheuil | Charles Dumas d'Orgheuil | Philippe Setbon | TV movie |
| 1994 | Mort d'un gardien de la paix | Victor | Josée Dayan | TV series, 1 episode |
| 1994 | Revenge of the Musketeers | Duke of Crassac | Bertrand Tavernier | Nominated - César Award for Best Supporting Actor |
| 1994 | Colonel Chabert | Chamblin | Yves Angelo | |
| 1994 | Le jardin des plantes | Fernand Bornard | Philippe de Broca | TV movie |
| 1994 | Radetzkymarsch | Doctor Demant | Axel Corti & Gernot Roll | TV miniseries |
| 1995 | Dis-moi oui... | Professor Villiers | Alexandre Arcady | |
| 1995 | Été brulant | Ivan Petrov | Jérôme Foulon | TV movie |
| 1995 | La fête des pères | Louis Galissier | Jean-Daniel Verhaeghe | TV movie |
| 1995 | Les vacances de l'inspecteur Lester | Lester | Alain Wermus | TV movie |
| 1996 | Désiré | Montignac | Bernard Murat | |
| 1996 | Le bel été 1914 | Count of Sainteville | Christian de Chalonge | |
| 1996 | Captain Conan | General Pitard de Lauzier | Bertrand Tavernier (2) | |
| 1996 | Mon père avait raison | Adolphe & Charles | Roger Vadim | TV movie |
| 1997 | Nel profondo paese straniero | René Kermadec | Fabio Carpi | |
| 1997 | Faussaires et assassins | Robert Foquet | Peter Kassovitz (5) | TV series, 1 episode |
| 1997 | Le rouge et le noir | Marquis de la Môle | Jean-Daniel Verhaeghe (2) | TV movie |
| 1998 | Lautrec | Alphonse de Toulouse-Lautrec | Roger Planchon | |
| 1998 | Clarissa | Professor Silberstein | Jacques Deray | TV movie |
| 1999 | Le derrière | Pierre Arroux | Valérie Lemercier | |
| 1999 | Balzac | Lawyer Plissoud | Josée Dayan (2) | TV miniseries |
| 1999 | Season's Beatings | Stanislas | Danièle Thompson | Nominated - César Award for Best Supporting Actor |
| 2000 | Actors | Himself | Bertrand Blier | |
| 2001 | Thérèse et Léon | Léon Blum | Claude Goretta | TV movie |
| 2001 | Unfair Competition | Count Treuberg | Ettore Scola | |
| 2002 | Asterix & Obelix: Mission Cleopatra | Getafix | Alain Chabat | |
| 2002 | John XXIII: The Pope of Peace | Cardinal Alfredo Ottaviani | Giorgio Capitani | TV movie |
| 2002 | Les amants de Mogador | | Souheil Ben-Barka | |
| 2003 | The Mystery of the Yellow Room | Judge De Marquet | Bruno Podalydès | |
| 2003 | Le coût de la vie | Maurice | Philippe Le Guay | |
| 2003 | Rien, voilà l'ordre | Doctor Nuytel | Jacques Baratier (2) | |
| 2003 | Là-haut, un roi au-dessus des nuages | The Editor-in-chief | Pierre Schoendoerffer (2) | |
| 2003 | Portrait caché | Lucien Meyer | Jean-Louis Leconte | |
| 2004 | Le Cou de la girafe | Paul | Safy Nebbou | |
| 2005 | The Perfume of the Lady in Black | Judge De Marquet | Bruno Podalydès (2) | |
| 2005 | Galilée ou L'amour de Dieu | Galilée | Jean-Daniel Verhaeghe (3) | TV movie |
| 2005 | Les Rois maudits | Cardinal Deuze | Josée Dayan (3) | TV miniseries |
| 2005 | La séparation | Father Gayraud | François Hanss | TV movie |
| 2006 | Private Fears in Public Places | Arthur | Alain Resnais (3) | Voice |
| 2006 | Président | Frédéric Saint-Guillaume | Lionel Delplanque | |
| 2007 | Voltaire et l'affaire Calas | Voltaire | Francis Reusser | TV movie |
| 2008 | With a Little Help from Myself | Robert | François Dupeyron | Nominated - César Award for Best Supporting Actor |
| 2008 | Crime Is Our Business | Roderick Charpentier | Pascal Thomas | |
| 2009 | La reine morte | | Pierre Boutron | TV movie |
| 2009 | Park Benches | The backgammon player | Bruno Podalydès (3) | |
| 2011 | Bouquet final | Jules | Josée Dayan (4) | TV movie |
| 2011 | All Together | Claude Blanchard | Stéphane Robelin | |
| 2012 | 10 jours en or | Pierre | Nicolas Brossette | |
| 2012 | Looking for Hortense | Sébastien Hauer | Pascal Bonitzer | Nominated - César Award for Best Supporting Actor |
| 2015 | Ladygrey | Henri | Alain Choquart | (final film role) |

== Theater ==
| Year | Title | Author | Director | Notes |
|---|---|---|---|---|
| 1951 | The Winter's Tale | William Shakespeare | Julien Bertheau | |
| 1951 | The Fatted Calf | Bernard Zimmer | Julien Bertheau (2) | |
| 1952 | Hernani | Victor Hugo | Henri Rollan | |
| 1952 | Six Characters in Search of an Author | Luigi Pirandello | Julien Bertheau (3) | |
| 1952 | Romeo and Juliet | William Shakespeare | Julien Bertheau (4) | |
| 1952 | Philippe et Jonas | Irwin Shaw | Jean-Pierre Grenier | |
| 1954 | Rope | Patrick Hamilton | Jean Darcante | |
| 1954 | Bel Ami | Guy de Maupassant | Jean Darcante (2) | |
| 1954 | Les Boulingrin | Georges Courteline | Jean Darcante (3) | |
| 1954 | Carlos et Marguerite | Jean Bernard-Luc | Christian-Gérard | |
| 1955 | The Teahouse of the August Moon | John Patrick | Marguerite Jamois | |
| 1955 | Les Amants novices | Jean Bernard-Luc | Jean Mercure | |
| 1955 | TTX | Cécil Saint-Laurent & Pierre de Meuse | Alice Cocéa | |
| 1955 | Espoir | Henri Bernstein | Henri Bernstein | |
| 1956 | La petite hutte | André Roussin | André Roussin | |
| 1956 | Virginie | Michel André | Christian-Gérard (2) | |
| 1957 | Les Pas perdus | Pierre Gascar | Jacques Mauclair | |
| 1958 | Père | Édouard Bourdet | Pierre Fresnay | |
| 1958 | Virginie | Michel André | Christian-Gérard (3) | |
| 1959 | Les Choutes | Pierre Barillet & Jean-Pierre Gredy | Jean Wall | |
| 1959 | Una bella domenica di settembre | Ugo Betti | André Barsacq | |
| 1960 | Château en Suède | Françoise Sagan | André Barsacq (2) | |
| 1961 | La Rouille | Carlos Semprún | Jean-Marie Serreau | |
| 1962 | Château en Suède | Françoise Sagan | André Barsacq (3) | |
| 1962-63 | Victor, or Power to the Children | Roger Vitrac | Jean Anouilh & Roland Piétri | |
| 1963 | La Crécelle | Charles Dyer | Michel Fagadau | |
| 1966 | The Homecoming | Harold Pinter | Claude Régy | |
| 1968 | Four Seasons | Arnold Wesker | Claude Régy (2) | |
| 1970-72 | Hadrian the Seventh | Peter Luke | Raymond Rouleau | |
| 1972 | Honni soit qui mal y pense | Peter Barnes | Stuart Burge | |
| 1973 | Jean de La Fontaine | Sacha Guitry | René Clermont | |
| 1975 | Le Zouave | Claude Rich | Jean-Louis Thamin | |
| 1976 | Lorenzaccio | Alfred de Musset | Franco Zeffirelli | |
| 1977 | Poor Murderer | Pavel Kohout | Michel Fagadau (2) | |
| 1977-78 | Pericles, Prince of Tyre | William Shakespeare | Roger Planchon | |
| 1979 | Un habit pour l'hiver | Claude Rich | Georges Wilson | |
| 1983 | K2 | Patrick Meyers | Georges Wilson (2) | |
| 1986 | Faisons un rêve | Sacha Guitry | Jacques Rosny | Nominated - Molière Award for Best Actor |
| 1987 | Une chambre sur la Dordogne | Claude Rich | Jorge Lavelli | |
| 1988 | Réveille-toi, Philadelphie ! | François Billetdoux | Jorge Lavelli (2) | |
| 1989-91 | Le Souper | Jean-Claude Brisville | Jean-Pierre Miquel | Nominated - Molière Award for Best Actor |
| 2003 | Embers | Sándor Márai | Didier Long | Nominated - Molière Award for Best Actor |
| 2005 | Le Caïman | Antoine Rault | Hans Peter Cloos | Nominated - Molière Award for Best Actor |
| 2008 | Le Diable Rouge | Antoine Rault | Christophe Lidon | Nominated - Molière Award for Best Actor |
| 2011-12 | L'Intrus | Antoine Rault | Christophe Lidon (2) | |

== Awards ==
- 2002 : Honorary César
- 2008 : Prix Henri-Langlois Actor
