= Michel Vitold =

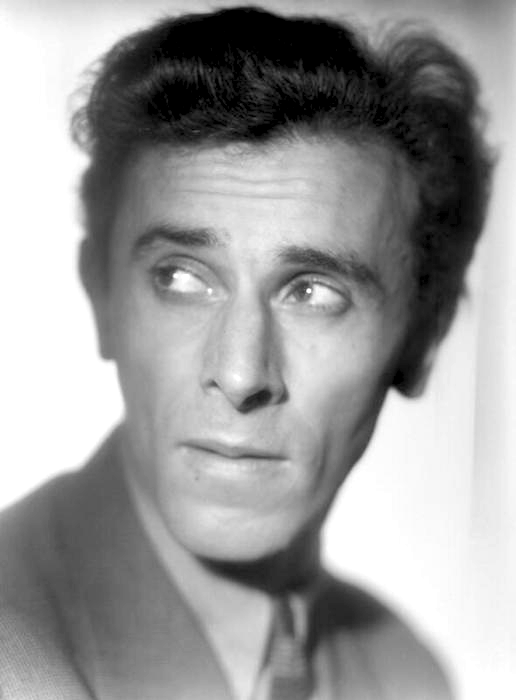
- Image of Michel Vitold
- Born: 15 September 1914; Kharkiv, Russian Empire
- Died: 14 June 1994 (Aged 79); Paris, France
- Occupation: Actor
- Years active: 1938–1993 (film)

Michel Vitold (1914–1994) was a Russian-born French stage and film actor.

== Selected filmography ==
- Orage (1938) - Georges (uncredited)
- Adrienne Lecouvreur (1938) - Le tueur
- The Curtain Rises (1938) - Gabriel, un élève du Conservatoire
- Final Accord (1938) - Un élève du conservatoire de musique
- La Symphonie fantastique (1942) - Un chef d'orchestre (uncredited)
- Fantastic Night (1942) - Boris
- Love Marriage (1942) - Le fou du sixième
- Madame et le mort (1943) - Nazarian
- Malaria (1943) - Henri Malfas
- Ceux du rivage (1943) - Le juge d'instruction
- Le brigand gentilhomme (1943) - Le roi Don Carlos
- L'aventure est au coin de la rue (1944) - Waldo
- The Island of Love (1944) - André Bozzi
- François Villon (1945) - Noël, le borgne
- The Last Judgment (1945) - Vassili
- The Visitor (1946) - Oxner
- Rouletabille joue et gagne (1947)
- Rouletabille contre la dame de pique (1948)
- The Secret of Mayerling (1949) - L'archiduc Jean-Salvator
- Messalina (1951) - Narciso / Narcissus
- Jouons le jeu (1952) - l'acteur (segment 'La paresse')
- Les révoltés de Lomanach (1954) - Rabuc
- The Doctor's Horrible Experiment (1959, TV Movie) - Docteur Séverin
- Maigret and the Saint-Fiacre Case (1959) - L'abbé Jodet - curé de Saint-Fiacre
- L'ennemi dans l'ombre (1960) - Eric Urenbach
- Vacances en enfer (1961) - M. Martel
- Adorable Liar (1962) - Antoine
- Les Ennemis (1962) - Andreï Smoloff
- The Dance (1962) - Antonin
- Arsène Lupin Versus Arsène Lupin (1962) - Kartenberg devenu le baron Von Krantz
- Ballade pour un voyou (1963) - Stéphane Donnacil
- Rififi in Tokyo (1963) - Pierre Merigné
- Judex (1963) - Le banquier Favraux
- Les Pas perdus (1964) - Pierre Simonnet
- Thomas the Impostor (1965) - Le docteur Vernes
- Le Chant du monde (1965) - Toussaint
- Le Franciscain de Bourges (1968) - François Magnol
- La Bande à Bonnot (1968) - Victor Kilbatchiche
- The Confession (1970) - Smola
- Love at the Top (1974) - Georges Groult
- France société anonyme (1974) - Le fourgueur
- Genre masculin (1977) - M. Jacquot
- That Night in Varennes (1982) - De Florange
- Basileus Quartet (1983) - Guglielmo
- Les matins chagrins (1990) - Georges
- Les chevaliers de la table ronde (1990) - Le Roi Pêcheur
- Listopad (1992)
- La joie de vivre (1993) - Henri Jolly (final film role)

== Bibliography ==
- Raymond Durgnat. Franju: Movie Edition. University of California Press, 1968.
