= Jean Bertho =

French actor and film director (1928–2023)

- Born: Jean René Albert Berthollier; 23 January 1928; Pont-à-Mousson, France
- Died: 4 January 2023 (aged 94)
- Occupations: Actor; Film director

Jean René Albert Berthollier (23 January 1928 – 4 January 2023), better known by the stage name of Jean Bertho, was a French actor and film director. He rose to popularity due to his participation in the television show Les Jeux de 20 heures, as well as Jean Amadou's show, C'est pas sérieux.

== Biography ==
Berthollier was born in Pont-à-Mousson on 23 January 1928. He studied at the Conservatoire d'art dramatique de Nancy and was later instructed by Charles Dullin alongside the likes of Jean Rochefort and Jean-Pierre Marielle. From 1949 to 1959, he was an actor, appearing in close to thirty films, television shows, and plays.

In 1961, Berthollier began working as a contributor to the television news program Cinq colonnes à la une, producing several reports on Southeast Asia. In 1965, he began hosting other television news programs, such as Lectures pour tous and En votre âme et conscience. From 1974 to 1982, he hosted C'est pas sérieux. He then produced and hosted Télé à la Une on TF1 and Les Choses du lundi from 1984 to 1985.

In his later years, Berthollier regularly participated in the show Les Jeux de 20 heures. After the privatization of TF1 in 1987, he produced and directed Les Choses du lundi for Antenne 2. In 1990, he began to focus on writing, authoring a biography of Yvan Goll in the magazine Europe.

Jean Bertho died on 4 January 2023, at the age of 94.

== Filmography ==
=== Actor ===
- La Marie du port (1950)
- La caméra explore le temps (1958)
- The Doctor's Horrible Experiment (1959)
- L'inspecteur Leclerc enquête (1962)

=== Director ===
- Dim Dam Dom (1965)
- En votre âme et conscience (1966–1968)
- Sérieux s'abstenir (1969)

=== Assistant director ===
- We Will Go to Deauville (1962)
