= Arsène Lupin Versus Arsène Lupin (1962 film) =

1962 film

- Directed by: Édouard Molinaro
- Written by: François Chavane; Édouard Molinaro; Georges Neveux
- Based on: Arsène Lupin by Maurice Leblanc
- Produced by: François Chavane; Marcello Danon
- Starring: Jean-Claude Brialy; Jean-Pierre Cassel; Françoise Dorléac
- Cinematography: Pierre Petit
- Edited by: Monique Isnardon; Robert Isnardon
- Music by: Georges Van Parys
- Production companies: Cinéphonic; Da.Ma. Cinematografica; Gaumont
- Distributed by: Gaumont Distribution (France); Titanus (Italy)
- Release date: 29 August 1962
- Running time: 111 minutes
- Countries: France; Italy
- Language: French

Arsène Lupin Versus Arsène Lupin (French: Arsène Lupin contre Arsène Lupin) is a 1962 French-Italian comedy mystery crime film directed by Édouard Molinaro and starring Jean-Claude Brialy, Jean-Pierre Cassel and Françoise Dorléac. It was one of a number of screen adaptations featuring Maurice Leblanc's gentleman thief Arsène Lupin. It was shot at the Billancourt Studios in Paris and on location around the city. The film's sets were designed by the art director Robert Clavel.

== Cast ==
- Jean-Claude Brialy as François de Vierne
- Jean-Pierre Cassel as Gérard Dagmar
- Françoise Dorléac as Nathalie Cartier
- Geneviève Grad as Catherine - la princesse de Poldavie
- Jean Le Poulain as Le préfet de police/Police Prefect
- Michel Vitold as Kartenberg devenu le baron Von Krantz
- Anne Vernon as Madame de Bellac
- Daniel Cauchy as Charly
- Fernand Fabre as Le conseiller de Vierne
- Jean-Marie Proslier as Monsieur de Bellac
- André Badin as Le chroniqueur mondain débutant
- Gregori Chmara as Basile
- Yvonne Clech as Anne de Vierne
- Madeleine Clervanne as Cécile Borel
- Paul Demange as Maître Puisette
- Hubert Deschamps as Le ministre
- Henri Garcin as Hans
- Jacques Herlin as Un homme de main du médecin
- Hubert de Lapparent as Le croque-mort
- Jacques Mancier as Le gouverneur
- Mary Marquet as la reine-mère Elisabeth de Moldavie/Queen Mother
- Charles Millot as Le "docteur"
- Alain Morat as Le petit Michel
- Jean-Jacques Steen as Le patron de la boîte de nuit
- Henri Virlojeux as L'inspecteur Ganimard
- Robert Arnoux as Hector Martin
- Dominique Zardi as Albert
- Robert Burnier as Joseph - le majordome
- Pascal Mazzotti as Le commissaire de Dieppe
- Evelyne Ker as L'entraîneuse au cabinet

== Bibliography ==
- Hardy, Phil. The BFI Companion to Crime. A&C Black, 1997.
- Rège, Philippe. Encyclopedia of French Film Directors, Volume 1. Scarecrow Press, 2009.
