= Male Hunt =

1964 film by Édouard Molinaro

- Theatrical release poster
- French: La Chasse à l'homme
- Directed by: Édouard Molinaro
- Screenplay by: France Roche
- Dialogue by: Michel Audiard
- Story by: Albert Simonin; Yvon Guézel; Michel Duran
- Produced by: Robert Amon; Claude Jaeger
- Starring: Jean-Claude Brialy; Catherine Deneuve; Marie Laforêt; Claude Rich; Françoise Dorléac; Jean-Paul Belmondo
- Cinematography: Andréas Winding
- Edited by: Robert Isnardon; Monique Isnardon
- Music by: Michel Magne; Giorgos Zampetas
- Production companies: Procinex; Mondex Films; Filmsonor; Euro International Films
- Distributed by: Gaumont Distribution (France); Euro International Films (Italy)
- Release dates: 18 September 1964 (Italy); 22 September 1964 (France)
- Running time: 100 minutes
- Countries: France; Italy
- Language: French
- Box office: $12.5 million

Male Hunt (French: La chasse à l'homme; Italian: Caccia al maschio) is a 1964 comedy film directed by Édouard Molinaro and starring Jean-Claude Brialy, Catherine Deneuve, Marie Laforêt, Claude Rich, Françoise Dorléac and Jean-Paul Belmondo.

== Plot ==
It is the day that Antoine, a Paris advertising man, is to marry the lovely Gisèle and his best man Julien, a divorced statistician, tries to talk him out of it with tales of the hard times he had from women, ending in entrapment by his stunning secretary Denise, a professional virgin. Going into a bistro for a quick drink before they drive to the wedding, the owner Fernand, a retired villain and pimp, tells the two of his exploits that ended in marriage to pretty but pushy Sophie. Antoine decides to run for it, taking one of the tickets for the honeymoon in Greece and giving the other to Fernand. On board ship, he falls for the delectable Sandra, a professional confidence woman, who cleans him out of his money but eventually agrees to marry him. Fernand comes back with an old millionairess, former brothel owner, who drives a Rolls-Royce. At the wedding of Antoine and Sandra, Julien falls for a sweet brunette.

== Cast ==
- Jean-Claude Brialy as Antoine Monteil
- Françoise Dorléac as Françoise Bricart
- Marie Laforêt as Gisèle
- Claude Rich as Julien Brenot
- Catherine Deneuve as Denise Heurtin
- Marie Dubois as Sophie
- Hélène Duc as Madame Armande
- Bernadette Lafont as Flora
- Jacques Dynam as a mobster
- Tanya Lopert as Mauricette
- Jacqueline Mille as Odette
- Yvon Sarray as Sophie's father
- Patrick Thévenon as Hubert
- Francis Blanche as Kino Papatakis
- Bernard Blier as Mr. Heurtin
- Mireille Darc as Georgina
- Micheline Presle as Isabelle Lartois
- Michel Serrault as Gaston Lartois
- Jean-Paul Belmondo as Fernand
- Bernard Meunier as Sophie's boyfriend (uncredited)
- Noël Roquevert as the stepfather (uncredited)
- Henri Attal as a mobster (uncredited)
- Dominique Zardi as a mobster (uncredited)

== Reception ==
Male Hunt recorded admissions of 1,664,555 in France.
