= Maurice Dorléac =

French actor and Nazi propagandist (1901–1979)

- Born: Georges Maurice Edmond Dorléac; 26 March 1901; Paris, France
- Died: 4 December 1979 (aged 78); Paris, France
- Spouse: Renée Simonot (m. 1940)
- Children: 3, including Françoise Dorléac and Catherine Deneuve
- Relatives: Christian Vadim (grandson); Chiara Mastroianni (granddaughter)

Georges Maurice Edmond Dorléac (French pronunciation: [ʒɔʁʒ mɔʁis ɛdmɔ̃ dɔʁleak]; 26 March 1901 – 4 December 1979) was a French actor and Nazi propagandist. He was the husband of actress Renée Simonot, the father of actresses Catherine Deneuve, Françoise Dorléac and Sylvie Dorléac, and the grandfather of actors Christian Vadim and Chiara Mastroianni.

During the German occupation of France in World War II, Dorléac participated in 76 broadcasts on the Nazi-controlled Radio Paris and in two short propaganda films for the Nazis, which led to him being charged with national indignity and sentenced to a six-month prohibition on working in theatre and cinema.

== Life and career ==
Georges Maurice Edmond Dorléac was born on 26 March 1901, at 14 Rue des Quatre-Vents, in the 6th arrondissement of Paris. His father, Alphonse Dorléac, was a bookstore employee; his mother was Berthe Marie Smout.

While working at MGM, Dorléac met actress Renée Simonot and they married in 1940. The couple had three daughters: actresses Françoise Dorléac (1942–1967), Catherine Deneuve (born 22 October 1943), and Sylvie Dorléac (born 14 December 1946).

During the Nazi occupation of France in World War II, Dorléac collaborated with Radio Paris, a radio station controlled by the German occupation authorities. According to Le Monde and Le Parisien, he participated in 76 radio broadcasts or plays for the station. He also appeared in two propaganda short films produced for the Milice in 1944. Following the Liberation of France, Dorléac was charged with national indignity in 1945 by the Civic Court of Paris and sentenced to a six-month prohibition on working in theatre and cinema. His wartime activities were later discussed in the 2007 unauthorized biography Deneuve, l'affranchie, written by journalist Bernard Violet. The biography's allegations about Dorléac's collaborationist activities became a subject of controversy. In a January 2009 interview with The Guardian, Dorléac's daughter, Catherine Deneuve, expressed anger over the portrayal of her father and announced her intention to sue the book's editor. She said that she wanted to take legal action on her father's behalf and accused the author of inventing facts, although her father's Nazi propaganda works and subsequent charges were backed by public archives and documents. Deneuve also revealed that her lawyer had advised her to postpone legal action because the book had not sold well. No subsequent lawsuit or court proceedings involving Deneuve and the author or publisher have been identified.

== Death ==
Dorléac's tomb next to his wife Renée Simonot and his daughter Françoise Dorléac at the Seine-Port cemetery in Seine-et-Marne.

Dorléac died on 4 December 1979, aged 78, in the 16th arrondissement of Paris. He is burried in the family vault at the Seine-Port cemetery in Seine-et-Marne, alongside his daughter Françoise Dorléac and his wife, Renée Simonot.

== Filmography ==
Year	Title	Role	Notes
1938	The President	Rosimond	
1938	La goualeuse	L'avocat	
1938	Remontons les Champs-Élysées	Un consommateur	Uncredited
1941	Madame Sans-Gêne	Lauriston	Uncredited
1942	The Duchess of Langeais	Le baron Auguste de Maulincour	
1942	La Symphonie fantastique	Un consommateur	Uncredited
1942	The Newspaper Falls at Five O'Clock	Georges Lefèvre	Uncredited
1943	Shot in the Night	Fronsac	
1943	Madame et le mort	Un philosophe	
1944	Sowing the Wind		
1945	Farandole		
1946	Martin Roumagnac		Uncredited
1947	Miroir	Le chef de cabinet	Uncredited
1949	Du Guesclin		
1949	The Nude Woman	Le médecin	
1950	Pigalle-Saint-Germain-des-Prés		
1950	Lost Souvenirs	Le directeur du "Régina"	(segment "Une statuette d'Osiris"), Uncredited
1951	The Red Rose	Le caissier	
1951	The Passage of Venus	Le commissaire de police	
1951	Never Two Without Three	Le directeur de la radio	
1952	The House on the Dune		
1952	Nous sommes tous des assassins	Le président	Uncredited
1952	The Agony of the Eagles		
1953	Les amours finissent à l'aube		
1953	Le dernier Robin des Bois	Le capitaine	Uncredited
1953	Rue de l'Estrapade	Petit rôle	Uncredited
1955	The Duratons	Le ministre	
1956	It Happened in Aden		
1957	Love in Jamaica	Le gérant de l'hôtel	
1961	The President		Uncredited
1973	La Grande Bouffe		
1975	Section spéciale	Jules-Henri Desfourneaux, l'Exécuteur en chef des arrêts criminels	
1976	Body of My Enemy		
1977	Le Juge Fayard dit Le Shériff	Le président Chazerand	
