= Chantal Poupaud =

French producer, director and screenwriter (died 2022)

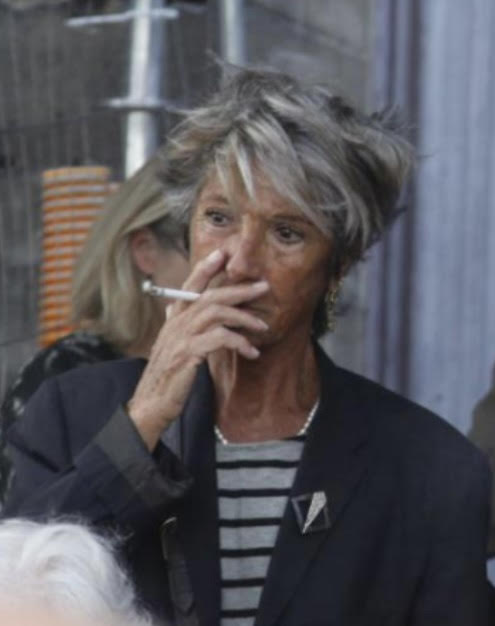
- Born: Chantal Richard
- Died: 21 June 2022
- Occupations: Film producer, director, screenwriter
- Children: 2

Chantal Poupaud (née Richard; died 21 June 2022) was a French film producer, director and screenwriter. After starting out as a press attachée, she was behind the 1990s Arte series Tous les garçons et les filles de leur âge.

== Biography ==
Poupaud grew up in Brissac-Quincé in Maine-et-Loire. She worked to promote the films of Marguerite Duras for seven years, as well as films directed by Raúl Ruiz, Benoît Jacquot, Chantal Akerman, Lino Brocka, Aki Kaurismäki, and Wim Wenders.

At the start of the 1990s, Poupaud discovered the idea for Tous les garçons et les filles de leur âge while watching her two sons, Yarol, aged 18 and Melvil, aged 14. She believed that being a teenager was the same for all, despite different circumstances. She then invented the idea of a series of films on adolescence. Her series was broadcast in 1994 and received critical acclaim.

In the late 1990s, Poupaud experienced health problems, inspiring her to create a series based on "a heroine who finds herself facing a therapist after having found herself struggling with her body". She produced a series titled Toutes les femmes sont folles and the Jacquot-directed 1997 film Seventh Heaven, both based on this idea.

Chantal Poupaud died on 21 June 2022.

== Filmography ==
=== Producer ===
- Tous les garçons et les filles de leur âge (1994)
- Seventh Heaven (1997)
- Under the Sand (2000)
- Crossdresser (2010)

=== Director ===
- Maurice le mauricien (2000)
- Crossdresser (2010)

=== Screenwriter ===
- Riviera (2005)
