= The Dance (1962 film) =

- Directed by: Norbert Carbonnaux
- Written by: François Billetdoux
- Produced by: Mag Bodard
- Starring: Jean-Pierre Cassel; Françoise Dorléac; Arletty
- Cinematography: Pierre Petit
- Music by: Guy Béart
- Production companies: CDC; Parc Film
- Release date: 21 February 1962
- Running time: 90 minutes
- Country: France
- Language: French

The Dance (French: La gamberge) is a 1962 French comedy film directed by Norbert Carbonnaux and starring Jean-Pierre Cassel, Françoise Dorléac and Arletty. The film is based on the French comic strip 13 rue de l'Espoir.

== Cast ==
- Jean-Pierre Cassel as Albert
- Françoise Dorléac as Françoise
- Arletty as La mère d'Albert
- Jean Poiret as Vieux
- Michel Serrault as Pétrarque
- Micheline Francey as La tante
- Evelyne Ker as Antoinette
- Michel Vitold as Antonin
- Denise Gence as La directrice de l'institut Saint-Marc
- Christian Marin as Le caméraman
- Régine as Régine
- Raoul Saint-Yves
- Marie-Claude Breton
- Hélène Dieudonné as La grand-mère de Françoise
- Pierre Duncan as Le boucher
- Louis Saintève as Le grand-père de Françoise
- Sophie Leclair
- Lydia Rogier
- Pascal Fardoulis
- Françoise Deldick
- François Billetdoux as Le religieux
- Jean-Jacques Debout as Le soupirant de Françoise
- Denise Péronne as Une élève danseuse
- Roger Trapp as Un élève danseur

== Bibliography ==
- Quinlan, David. Quinlan's Film Stars. Batsford, 2000.
