= The Insomniac on the Bridge =

- Film poster
- Directed by: Raúl Ruiz
- Written by: Raúl Ruiz
- Produced by: Paulo Branco
- Starring: Michael Lonsdale
- Cinematography: François Ede
- Edited by: Rudolfo Wedeles
- Music by: Jorge Arriagada; Gérard Maimone
- Distributed by: Citévox
- Release date: 2 October 1985
- Running time: 85 minutes
- Country: France
- Language: French

The Insomniac on the Bridge (French: L'Éveillé du pont de l'Alma) is a 1985 French surrealist film directed by Chilean filmmaker Raúl Ruiz.

== Plot ==
The plot of this film revolves around two insomniacs, a hunchback boxer and a voyeuristic teacher, who after meeting one another on a bridge decide to rape a pregnant woman. The two men discuss what it is like not being able to sleep and how they both feel disconnected from the rest of the world. Both men start to lose their grip on reality when they believe that by not sleeping, they somehow have a newfound power that will allow them to control all of the awake people. Ruiz's style of filmmaking becomes noticeably more convoluted and dreamlike as the character's journey through this nightmarish trance.

== Cast ==
- Michael Lonsdale as Antoine
- Olimpia Carlisi as Violette
- Jean Badin as The Doctor
- Jean-Bernard Guillard as Marcel
- Kim Massee as Anne
- Melvil Poupaud as Michel

== Reception ==
Although some true "Ruizian" fans commend this work for staying true to Ruiz's unique style of filmmaking, many others view it as a lost opportunity to delve deeper into a more philosophical analysis of the relationship between two insomniacs and the world. Many believe this opportunity was lost because the film was so experimental with its bombardment of confusing dream sequences and "supernatural events" that any salvageable themes or motifs were buried too deep to make any lasting impression on its audience.

One review from Lenny Borger from Variety, quotes the Ruiz as directing this film in an almost “comatose state”. He goes on to commend Ruiz’s rapid fire style of filmmaking, at the time this was the 6th film he had made that year, all of which were on a “shoestring” budget to make things even more impressive. Unfortunately, the reviews from the time stay true to viewers interpretations today. Borger says it best when he writes that “there are numerous consequences and surprises in this metaphysical farce but little enjoyable sense or nonsense to be had by the viewer.”

== In Ruizian cinema ==
The common trend when discussing or analyzing any of Ruiz’s works is to not focus on them individually, but rather in the context of his larger body of work. Ruiz was a rapid-fire filmmaker who wrote and directed numerous films with little to no budget around the clock. The result was that he got to make over 100 movies before his death in 2011, but many of them did not live up to the high standards of a critical audience. This is not to say that Insomniac on The Bridge does not have good elements, but rather illustrates that Ruiz’s style is just so avant-garde, that many of his films fail to resonate with an audience. Hollywood filmmakers would view this as a failure as their goal is to make money from films with an audience. However, Ruiz did not make films in the name of entertainment, he made them in the name of art and sometimes social or political commentary. One of his most well known films, Time Regained (1999), acts as a prime example of when his experimental style meshes well with an already established adaptation of a novel, making his unique artistic vision more palatable for the average viewer. It is a shame that many of his films go unnoticed or ignored for this reason, but at the end of the day, it is the price paid for such an incredibly vast body of work manifested in a single lifetime.
