= The Soft Skin =

1964 film by François Truffaut

- Theatrical release poster
- French: La peau douce
- Directed by: François Truffaut
- Written by: François Truffaut; Jean-Louis Richard
- Produced by: Marcel Berbert; António da Cunha Telles; François Truffaut
- Starring: Jean Desailly; Françoise Dorléac; Nelly Benedetti
- Cinematography: Raoul Coutard
- Edited by: Claudine Bouché
- Music by: Georges Delerue
- Production companies: Les Films du Carrosse; SEDIF; SIMAR
- Distributed by: Athos Films
- Release date: 20 April 1964 (France)
- Running time: 113 minutes
- Countries: France; Portugal
- Language: French
- Box office: 597,910 admissions (France)

The Soft Skin (French: La peau douce) is a 1964 romantic drama film directed by François Truffaut and starring Jean Desailly, Françoise Dorléac and Nelly Benedetti. Written by Truffaut and Jean-Louis Richard, it follows a married successful writer and lecturer who meets and has an affair with a flight attendant half his age. The film was shot on location in Paris, Reims, and Lisbon, and several scenes were filmed at Paris-Orly Airport. At the 1964 Cannes Film Festival, the film was nominated for the Palme d'Or. Despite Truffaut's recent success with Jules and Jim and The 400 Blows, The Soft Skin did not do well at the box office.

== Plot ==
Pierre Lachenay, a middle-aged heavyset married father and renowned writer, lecturer, and editor of a literary magazine, flies to Lisbon. As he disembarks the airplane, photographers approach Pierre and ask him to pose for a picture with Nicole, a young stewardess.

After delivering a lecture in a sold-out auditorium, Pierre returns to his hotel, where Nicole is also staying. He takes the elevator with her and, having noticed the room number on her key she just dropped, calls her from his room to invite her for a drink. She declines, but shortly after hanging up, she calls back. They agree to go out for drinks the following evening, even though Pierre had been scheduled to catch a plane at noon.

On their date, Pierre and Nicole talk in a bar until sunrise, and then return to their hotel and have sex. The next day, she slips him her phone number written inside a book of matches on the flight back to Paris, and Pierre tries to call Nicole that night while he and his wife Franca are entertaining friends. However, Nicole is not at home.

When Pierre gets hold of Nicole the next day, they meet up. He begins to use excuses to slip away and meet Nicole at the airport between her flights. They arrange to spend the night together, though not at her apartment, as the landlady knows her parents. They go to a nightclub and plan to stay at a hotel, but they do not check in, as the circumstances begin to make them feel sordid. Pierre takes Nicole home and invites her to go on an overnight trip to Reims the following week. She agrees, and, not wanting him to return to Franca, invites Pierre up to her apartment.

Pierre and Nicole drive to Reims and check into a hotel. He only agreed to his friend Clément's request to introduce a screening of Marc Allégret's 1951 documentary Avec André Gide so he could be alone with Nicole. However, he has to go to a dinner, give his speech, and then go out for drinks with Clément, while Nicole sits alone at the hotel, cannot get tickets to the sold-out screening, and is repeatedly propositioned by a man on the street. To avoid going to a reception after the screening, Pierre says that he has to return to Paris, but Clément asks for a ride to Paris. Pierre agrees, only to quickly ditch Clément and get Nicole from the hotel.

After driving through the night, Pierre and Nicole reach an inn in the countryside. They enjoy themselves, until Pierre calls Franca to say that he had to extend his stay in Reims and learns that she knows that he is lying. Pierre drops Nicole off at her apartment and goes home, where Franca accuses him of having an affair. He claims that he just needed time alone, but she does not believe him and says that they should separate. Calling Franca's bluff, Pierre does not argue and goes to sleep at his office.

Franca informs Pierre that she is initiating divorce proceedings. When he goes to retrieve his belongings, she alternates between treating him coldly, slapping him, begging him for forgiveness, and kissing him. They end up having sex. The next morning as Pierre is leaving, Franca asks if he wants to return to her, but he replies that it would never work. Franca's friend Odile later sees the state Franca is in. Odile fears that Franca may attempt suicide and throws away sleeping pills she finds in the bathroom.

Later in that evening, at a restaurant, Pierre gets embarrassed by Nicole's loud talking, and she asks him to take her home. Pierre apologizes and says that he has had a tough week and that he misses his daughter. Soon thereafter, Pierre shows Nicole the apartment being remodeling he plans for them to share, she says that she has realized that they are incompatible and ends the affair. Meanwhile, Franca uses a receipt from the pocket of one of Pierre's jackets to pick up the photographs Pierre took of he and Nicole on their romantic weekend. Franca then goes to a restaurant that Pierre frequents, tosses the photos at him, and shoots him pointblank with a shotgun. He collapses. Dropping the weapon, dazed, she sits down and smiles slightly.

== Cast ==
- Jean Desailly as Pierre Lachenay, a famous writer and lecturer
- Françoise Dorléac as Nicole, a flight attendant and Pierre's mistress
- Nelly Benedetti as Franca Lachenay, Pierre's wife and Sabine's mother
- Daniel Ceccaldi as Clément, Pierre's friend in Reims
- Laurence Badie as Ingrid, Sabine's nanny
- Sabine Haudepin as Sabine Lachenay, Pierre and Franca's daughter
- Philippe Dumat as Mr. Bertrand, the manager of the movie theater in Reims
- Dominique Lacarrière as Dominique, Lachenay's secretary
- Paule Emanuele as Odile, Franca's friend and Michel's wife
- Jean Lanier as Michel, Odile's husband
- Maurice Garrel as Mr. Bontemps, a member of the Reims Cultural Exchange Committee
- Pierre Risch as Father Coté, the director of the Reims Cultural Exchange Committee
- Gérard Poirot as Franck, one of Nicole's former lovers and the co-pilot on Pierre's flight to Lisbon (uncredited)
- Charles Lavialle as the night watchman at the Hotel Michelet in Reims (uncredited)
- Maximiliènne Harlaut as Mrs. Leloix, a member of the Reims Cultural Exchange Committee (uncredited)
- Olivia Poli as Mrs. Bontemps (uncredited)
- Catherine-Isabelle Duport as the girl who asks Pierre for his autograph in Reims (uncredited)

The film's screenwriters both have uncredited cameos: François Truffaut is the voice of the employee at the gas station at which Pierre and Nicole stop on the way to Reims, and Jean-Louis Richard is the man who incurs Franca's wrath after accosting her on the street in Paris.

== Production ==
The Soft Skin was shot from 21 October to 31 December 1963 in Paris, Reims, Lisbon and at Orly Airport in Orly.

== Release ==
=== Box office ===
The film did not perform well at the box office.

=== Reception ===
The Soft Skin received generally positive reviews from critics upon its release, however, and its stature has continued to grow over the years. On the review aggregator website Rotten Tomatoes, the film has an approval rating of 89% based on reviews from 28 critics, with an average score of 7.8/10.

Roger Ebert gave the film 3 out of 4 stars, calling it "uncannily prophetic", and J. Hoberman of The Village Voice wrote a glowing review of the film, in which he said: "François Truffaut's fourth feature, The Soft Skin, has never gotten much respect – even though many people (myself included) regard it as one of his best." Conversely, Stanley Kauffmann of The New Republic wrote that "Francois Truffaut's latest film is a failure. His triangle story is disappointingly trite in every regard and the conclusion is, alas, laughably melodramatic."

=== Accolades ===
Year	Award	Category	Recipient	Result
1964	Cannes Film Festival	Palme d'Or	François Truffaut	Nominated
1965	Bodil Awards	Best European Film	The Soft Skin	Won

=== Home media ===
The film was released on home video in the United States by The Criterion Collection, which described it as a "complex, insightful, and underseen French New Wave treasure".
