= Time Regained (film) =

1999 French epic historical psychological drama film by Raúl Ruiz

- Original film poster
- Directed by: Raúl Ruiz
- Screenplay by: Raúl Ruiz; Gilles Taurand
- Based on: In Search of Lost Time by Marcel Proust
- Produced by: Paulo Branco
- Starring: Catherine Deneuve; Emmanuelle Béart; Marcello Mazzarella; John Malkovich; Marie-France Pisier; Vincent Perez; Melvil Poupaud
- Cinematography: Ricardo Aronovich
- Edited by: Denise de Casabianca
- Music by: Jorge Arriagada
- Production companies: Gemini Films; France 2 Cinéma; Les Films du Lendemain
- Distributed by: Gemini Films; Kino International
- Release dates: 16 May 1999 (Cannes Film Festival); 19 May 1999 (France); 16 June 2000 (United States)
- Running time: 163 minutes
- Countries: France; Italy; Portugal
- Language: French
- Budget: $10.4 million
- Box office: $4.5 million

Time Regained (French: Le Temps Retrouvé) is a 1999 French epic period psychological drama film directed by Raúl Ruiz. It is an adaptation of the 1927 final volume of the seven-volume series In Search of Lost Time by Marcel Proust. The plot is about the anonymous narrator of In Search of Lost Time who reflects on his past experiences while lying on his deathbed.

The choice to develop the last volume of In Search of Lost Time allows the film to refer to the entire novel. For example, the film shows an episode from the first volume, Swann's Way (1913), usually referred to as "the lady in pink," as a flashback of Time Regained.

The film was entered into the 1999 Cannes Film Festival.

== Plot ==
Much of the film is composed of flashbacks of Marcel's memories of the past. One leads to another in what Proust called involuntary memory triggered by sights, sounds, and smells from the present.

The movie starts off with Marcel Proust on his deathbed. He is dictating something for his caretaker Céleste to write out for him. He dismisses her and flips through some pictures naming each person in the photos. This reminds him of his childhood. We then cut to Charlie Morel playing the piano at a party. Odette de Crécy directs the guests in the room to observe Marcel who is about ten years old. Marcel tips his hat to Odette's daughter Gilberte and both are called to take a picture. We return to adult Marcel asking Celeste about the smell of roses in the room. This reminds him of a lunch he once had with Gilberte.

Gilberte and Marcel are having lunch and discussing books. Marcel asks to borrow The Goncourt Journals. Marcel recalls a relationship he had with his ex-fiancé Albertine, in which he was heartbroken that she had been unfaithful with both women and men. Marcel breaks a tea cup and Gilberte has the pieces cleaned and put in her mahogany box.

Marcel has a nightmare and as he tries to pull the service bell, something stops him. He wakes up to a ghostly Albertine stroking his face. He wakes up again to realize that he had been dreaming this ghostly encounter. Marcel and Gilberte are walking down the street discussing her husband Robert de Saint-Loup as it starts to storm.

A younger Marcel is examining a picture of the younger Gilberte. There is a note on the back of the photograph. Marcel and his nurse (nanny) are playfully arguing about the signature being signed at the bottom. It transforms from Gilberte, to Albertine, to Libertinage.

Robert is reading an excerpt from the newspaper to Charlie with whom he has been having an affair. Charlie dismisses himself saying he must attend an algebra class and Robert becomes upset that he's leaving and throws his newspaper and a picture of Charlie onto the floor. Charlie returns home to Madame Verdurin who also believed he had been at algebra class. She holds up a picture of a woman that she found hidden behind another picture. She slaps him in fear that he is being unfaithful.

Robert and Marcel discuss Robert's mistress Rachel until Gilberte arrives. She is dressed in a red evening gown with a decorative headdress that is an exact copy of the costume Rachel wears to perform at the Comedie Francaise. She walks down the staircase and is followed by a vision of Rachel in the same outfit. As she descends the stairs, it switches back and forth between Gilberte's and Rachel's faces. Gilberte suddenly bursts into tears. Marcel and Gilberte make eye contact which prompts him to check the mahogany box that is on the fireplace. He discovers the broken tea cup. He is then surrounded by friends at a dinner table where they are telling stories about art and gossiping about others. He is then riding a train when he stops to see a younger version of himself in the window.

Going back to the party where Charlie is playing the piano, Madame Verdurin asks him to play a song. He claims he has enlisted to go to the front because of boredom and to maintain his reputation. He starts to play Beethoven which is considered shocking since France is at war with Germany. Odette de Crécy and Marcel take a carriage to another party. A siren then sounds which prompts the lights and music to turn off. Odette is then asked to leave the party. There are sounds of missiles and explosions in the background.

Marcel makes his way back into the building and moves from a room with guests around a dinner table to the kitchen where Le Prince de Foix and some other men are playing a game with food. The flags in the food represent war zones as they are studying the German troop movements. Marcel discusses the war with Robert's uncle, the Baron de Charlus as they hear the all-clear siren.

Odette visits a former lover who is sick and in bed. He instructs her to open a gift on the table which reveals several hundred francs. She closes the box and walks towards the bed to caress the man. It then cuts to a funeral which Marcel attends. The widow reveals the anger she feels at finding letters from her husband's mistress. Marcel reassures her that he loved her best.

Robert and Marcel then discuss the war. It then cuts to Marcel inside of an elevator in conversation with the bellhop about whether he had an intimate relationship with Robert. We then see Robert and Marcel at a later time where Robert is dressed in his military uniform. He discusses the bravery of commoners and their willingness to die for their country which makes them the best soldiers.

Madame Verdurin and Charlie are seen having lunch. She speaks of being written a prescription for croissants as it cures her headaches. She asks Charlie about his recent encounter with his former lover Charlus and we flash back to it. Charlie turns down an invitation to spend the night with Charlus to which he replies, “Charlie! Look out. I’ll get even!”

Marcel walks down a dark street and has flashbacks of his childhood. He encounters Le Prince de Foix and they discuss Robert who has been wrongly implicated in a spy scandal. Marcel visits a male brothel full of soldiers earning extra money while on leave from the war. He discovers a room where he hears the cries of Charlus who is being brutally whipped by one of the male prostitutes. As he is being tortured the screen turns red with blood. The whipping turns out to be erotic roleplaying requested by Charlus. He is a regular and knows all of the male prostitutes who work there. Marcel spies on Charlus through a window in his room. Marcel joins the soldiers in the common room where he sits in a chair. All the men then tell him not to sit in that chair as it is the place where the elder Prince de Foix died. The soldiers all line up as Charlus enters the room. Charlus walks by each of the soldiers, addresses them, and gives them money.

Sirens sound throughout the city once more, signaling air raids. People are seen fleeing the city carrying their belongings. Marcel's maid Francoise discovers that Marcel is still alive and expresses her gratitude to Robert who rescued him from the cellar. Marcel reads a note from Charlus giving the location of Morel, who is hiding from the police. Marcel meets with Charlie. He says that he is wanted for desertion from the army. Marcel persuades Charlie to settle his differences with Charlus who may be able to help him. Charlie explains that he fears the man.

We cut back to the funeral of Robert de Saint-Loup where several women mourn his death. We flash back to Robert talking with a teenage Marcel. This reminds him of their first meeting. Marcel points toward the beach and asks his grandmother if that is Robert de Saint-Loup. She pretends not to see who he's pointing at. Back at Robert's funeral, Charlie shows up with military police. Gilberte tries to ask him to leave but he rebuffs her. Robert's mother thanks Marcel for attending. As they leave, Madame Verdurin frantically searches for Odette to try to prevent Charlie's punishment for desertion.

After the war, Marcel is dropped at the park after a long stay at a sanatorium for an unspecified illness. He is met by an elderly, unkempt Charlus who is also suffering from an illness. He is accompanied by the former proprietor of the male brothel Jupien. He starts to list his family members that have passed. He bows to the carriage of Mrs. De Saint-Euverte. Jupien reminds him that he always hated her but Charlus is unconcerned. Charlus reminds Marcel of their first meeting.

The film flashes back to a teenage Marcel being called by his grandmother. Charlus walks up and scolds him for ignoring his grandmother. Charlus gives Marcel advice about how to behave in the future and lightly insults him. The older Marcel starts walking in the park. He trips and the background changes several times to different places in Marcel's past.

Marcel is led into the library at the Princess de Guarmantes' home where he moves from chair to chair until he is back on the same seat he started in. He is served tea and the sound of the spoon hitting the side of cup reminds him of train operators banging on the wheels of the train. He wipes his mouth after finishing his tea which reminds him of his teenage years at an oceanfront cottage. There is a statue on the beach which is carried off by six gentlemen. We see the same statue, only smaller, in the room where adult Marcel is drinking tea. He picks a book off the library shelf which reminds him of his mother reading the same book to him as a child to help him sleep.

A ballroom filled with many guests opens and the crowd moves toward a room filled with sweets and treats. Oriane de Guermantes walks towards Marcel, not knowing it is him. She finally recognizes him and they exchange memories of the past. She tells him that things have changed since he's been away. Charlie is now accepted into polite society and is even a favorite of the princess. She warns Marcel that Gilberte is a tramp; not worth his time. She claims (falsely) that Gilberte's infidelity was the reason that Robert enlisted and that Gilberte enjoyed the status her marriage brought her. She claims that Robert deliberately got himself killed in the war. He is then introduced to Madame de Farcy, an American married to Count de Farcy by Jacques de Rozier (Austin Bloch). Marcel then introduces him to the Prince de Guermantes. Marcel then bumps into Marquis de Cambremer who asks about Marcel's symptoms as he is in the later stages of the same illness. The music reminds Marcel of the time when Albertine played the piano when they lived together.

Marcel is discussing music and literature with Albertine, but she does not seem to be listening. She mentions letters exchanged between Morel and her androgynous friend Léa, which arouses jealousy in Marcel. She says that Léa and Gilberte had an affair. He asks if she was ever intimate with Léa. Albertine explains that Léa used to send carriages to Albertine's house to pick her up and ask her if she really liked girls, to which Albertine replied yes just to mess with Léa.

Marcel is moved to tears as the violin and piano play in the ballroom. The seating arrangements in the room start to shift back and forth as if they are sliding in the room. He is then greeted by a much older Gilberte who now looks a lot like her mother. She reminisces about Robert and tells Marcel that the former Madame Verdurin (now much older) is now the new Princess de Guermantes. Gilberte explains that the Guermantes were ruined by the war and the Verdurin fortune set them right. Oriane then asks Marcel if Gilberte was just playing a grieving widow act. She is upset at what she calls Gilberte's nonchalant attitude despite her husband passing away.

Marcel becomes increasingly uncomfortable listening to people criticizing Gilberte and her mother. Madame de Farcy says she feels close to Oriane but is disgusted with Odette despite their being related "distantly." Marcel says that he finds it ironic how a person's relations are distant or close depending on how much they are accepted in society. Finally, we see Odette wandering through the party looking lost and sad. Marcel realizes that Odette is the mistress of Oriane's husband the duke, which has made her a social outcast. The duke asks her to leave with him but she says she has better plans. Several people speak to Marcel but he says nothing. Gilberte begins talking and this reminds Marcel of a conversation he had with her husband Robert about men who are attracted to other men. The duke appears about to speak to Marcel but walks away. Odette explains to Marcel that the duke is so overprotective and jealous that he seems to be going mad. He locks her away from the world though she loves her freedom. She says all of her lovers have been jealous. This reminds Marcel of his first meeting with Odette when he was a young child. She was the mistress of his uncle who was also very jealous.

The grown-up Marcel finds himself in the same position as his younger self from the beginning of the film: in a room full of hats on the floor. The elderly Marcel visits the young Marcel and tells him of his love for Albertine and Gilberte. We then find both young Marcel and old Marcel travelling through different spaces in time throughout his life. Their last destination is the beach. We are read a quote from the sculptor Salvini: “My life has been a series of extraordinary adventures. To revisit them would only make me sadder. I’d rather use my remaining time to review my last work, Divine Nemesis, otherwise known as The Triumph of Death. So it was. Soon after, the Angel of Death returned to announce the end of his time of grace. 'What a paradox!' exclaimed Salvini. 'You gave me enough time to revisit my whole life, which lasted sixty-three years. The same length of time was too short to review an object I made in 3 months.' In this work is all of your life and the life of all men,' the Angel replied. 'To review it would take an eternity.'” We end with the present day Marcel walking towards the younger Marcel on the beach.

== Cast ==
- Catherine Deneuve as Odette De Crecy
- Emmanuelle Béart as Gilberte de Saint-Loup
- Vincent Perez as Charlie Morel
- John Malkovich as Le Baron de Charlus
- Pascal Greggory as Robert de Saint-Loup
- Marcello Mazzarella as Marcel, voiced by Patrice Chéreau
- Marie-France Pisier as Madame Verdurin
- Chiara Mastroianni as Albertine
- Arielle Dombasle as Madame de Farcy
- Édith Scob as Oriane de Guermantes
- Elsa Zylberstein as Rachel
- Mathilde Seigner as Céleste
- Christian Vadim as Bloch
- Dominique Labourier as Madame Cottard
- Philippe Morier-Genoud as Monsieur Cottard
- Melvil Poupaud as Le Prince de Foix
- Jean-François Balmer as Uncle Adolphe
- Alain Robbe-Grillet as Goncourt
- Bernard Garnier as Cambremer
- Logan Fuga as Josue

== Reception ==
=== Release and awards ===
Le Temps Retrouvé was released in France on 16 May 1999. The film was one of the nominations for the 2000 César Award for Best Costume Design. The budget for this film was about $10.4 million, however its gross income from box office amounted to about $4.5 million.

=== Critical reception ===
The film was featured at the retrospective commemoration which was held at Lincoln Center at the end of 2016 which ran during the week ending December 22. As stated by Richard Brody of The New Yorker at that time: "[The film] is also a triumph of classical cinematic values, reviving Proust's era with an obsessive attention to detail: the trim of mustaches and the cut of collars, a cortege of umbrellas straight out of a painting by Renoir, and hypnotically opulent furnishings seemingly borrowed from movies of the era. Many of Ruiz's films... involve tricks of time and memory; working with Proust, Ruiz seems to mind-meld with him, raising his own artistry to exquisite new heights." Frédéric Bonnaud describes Time Regained as "a film of old fashioned illusionism." The New York Times article goes on to say that if there had been any reward for the film, it would have been for sheer ambition. Many thought that it was risky to create a film of this work as the book did not exactly tell a story, but brought the readers around in circles. Roger Ebert praised the film noting that "It is not about memories but memory. Yours, mine, Proust's. Memory is what makes us human. Without it, we would be trapped in the moving dot of time as it slides through our lives." Anthony Lane wrote that Proust "was not fond of the cinema; but if he, and not merely his work, were alive today, he might well change his mind." The film has a 72% critic approval rating on Rotten Tomatoes.
