= Christian Vadim =

French actor (born 1963)

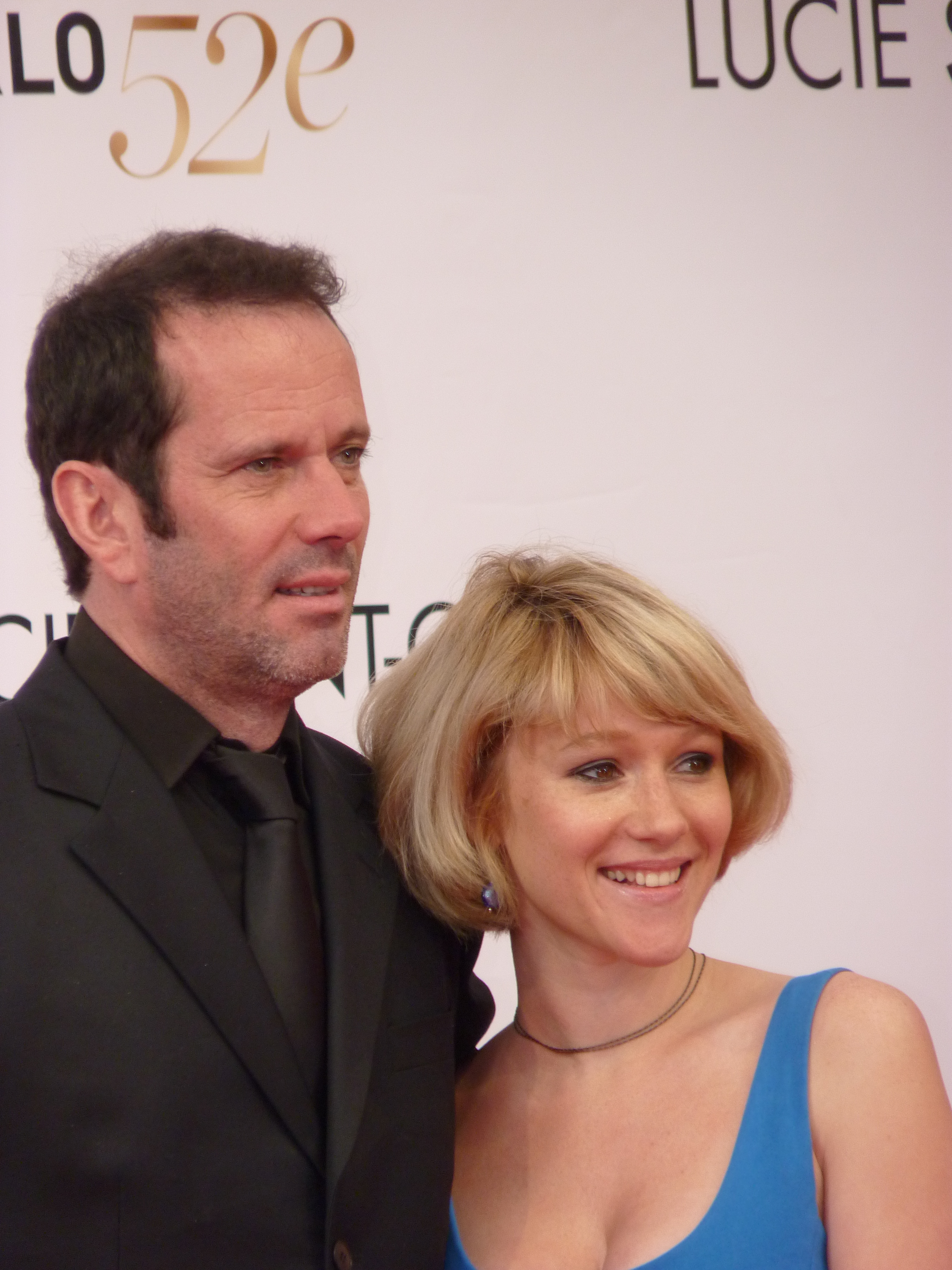
- Vadim and Julia Livage in 2012
- Born: Christian Igor Christoph Plemiannikov; 18 June 1963 (age 62); Boulogne-Billancourt, France
- Occupation: Actor
- Years active: 1983–present
- Spouse(s): Julia Livage (divorced); Nadège Meziat
- Children: 3
- Parent(s): Roger Vadim; Catherine Deneuve
- Relatives: Chiara Mastroianni (half-sister); Maurice Dorléac (grandfather); Renée Simonot (grandmother); Françoise Dorléac (aunt)

Christian Igor Christoph Plemiannikov, known as Christian Vadim (born 18 June 1963), is a French actor. He is the son of actress Catherine Deneuve and film director Roger Vadim.

== Career ==
Christian made his film debut in 1983, working with his father in the film Surprise Party, and appeared in Éric Rohmer's Full Moon in Paris the following year.

In 1999, he played Bloch in Time Regained (directed by Raúl Ruiz), which also starred his mother Catherine Deneuve. He then worked again with Ruiz on Love Torn in a Dream (2000), Savage Souls (2001), A Place Among the Living (2003), That Day (2003) and Night Across the Street (2012).

== Filmography ==
- Surprise Party (1983) - Christian Bourget
- College (1984) - Marco Poggi
- Full Moon in Paris (1984) - Bastien
- La Punyalada (1990)
- Mauvaise fille (1991) - Michel
- El invierno en Lisboa (1991) - Jim Biralbo
- Jalousie (1991) - Pierre
- Aire libre (1996) - Alexander von Humboldt, young
- L'Inconnu de Strasbourg (1998) - Audiard
- Time Regained (1999) - Bloch
- Love Torn in a Dream (2000) - David
- Savage Souls (2001) - Le pasteur
- La famille selon Mathieu (2002) - Mathieu
- Les liaisons dangereuses (2003, TV movie)
- Rien que du bonheur (2003) - José
- That Day (2003) - Ritter
- Il était une fois Jean-Sébastien Bach... (2003, TV movie) - Jean-Sébastien Bach
- A Place Among the Living (2003) - Ernest Ripper
- Princesse Marie (2004, TV movie) - Antoine Léoni
- Un truc dans le genre (2005) - Pierre Antoine Le Pelletier
- Le crime est notre affaire (2008)
- Celles qui aimaient Richard Wagner (2011)
- Nos plus belles vacances (2012) - Jacky
- Night Across the Street (2012) - Jean Giono
- Lines of Wellington (2012) - Marechal Soult
- Valentin Valentin (2015) - Sergio
