= Adorable Liar =

1962 film directed by Michel Deville

- Film poster
- Directed by: Michel Deville
- Written by: Nina Companeez; Michel Deville
- Produced by: Philippe Dussart
- Starring: Marina Vlady; Macha Méril; Jean-Marc Bory
- Cinematography: Claude Lecomte
- Edited by: Nina Companeez
- Music by: Jean-Jacques Grünenwald
- Production company: Eléfilm
- Distributed by: Les Films Fernand Rivers
- Release date: 2 February 1962
- Running time: 105 minutes
- Country: France
- Language: French

Adorable Liar (French: Adorable Menteuse) is a 1962 French romantic comedy film directed by Michel Deville, starring Marina Vlady, Macha Méril and Jean-Marc Bory.

== Premise ==
Juliette and Sophie are sisters: Juliette lies out of boredom, while Sophie has problems because of her excessive frankness. When Juliette falls in love with an older man, her past catches up with her: no matter how much she tries to convince him of her genuine feelings, he refuses to believe her. Thus love teaches her how important sincerity is; meanwhile, Sophie learns that a lie can be salutary.

== Cast ==
- Marina Vlady as Juliette
- Macha Méril as Sophie
- Michel Vitold as Antoine
- Jean-Marc Bory as Martin
- Claude Nicot as Sebastien
- Ginette Letondal as Jacky
- Jean-Pierre Moulin as Vincent
- François Dalou as Thomas
- Michael Lonsdale as Albert

== Bibliography ==
- Dayna Oscherwitz & MaryEllen Higgins. The A to Z of French Cinema. Scarecrow Press, 2009.
