= Tonight or Never (1961 film) =

1961 film

- Film poster
- Directed by: Michel Deville
- Written by: Michel Deville; Nina Companéez
- Starring: Anna Karina
- Cinematography: Claude Lecomte
- Edited by: Nina Companéez
- Production companies: Eléfilm; Ulysse Productions
- Release date: 29 September 1961
- Running time: 104 minutes
- Country: France
- Language: French

Tonight or Never (French: Ce soir ou jamais) is a 1961 French comedy film directed by Michel Deville and starring Anna Karina.

== Plot ==
Laurent, a poster artist, has organized a party at his home to celebrate the start of rehearsals for his first show, a musical comedy. But his star, Juliette, is injured in a traffic accident and he has to find a replacement. For his girlfriend Valérie, a student at the Conservatoire, it's an opportunity to demonstrate the extent of her talents by using all her charms to get this leading role that Laurent did not think to offer her.

== Cast ==
- Anna Karina as Valérie
- Claude Rich as Laurent
- Georges Descrières as Guillaume
- Jacqueline Danno as Martine
- Michel de Ré as Alex
- Guy Bedos as Jean-Pierre
- Eliane D'Almeida as Nicole
- Anne Tonietti as Anita
- Françoise Dorléac as Danièle
