= Treasure Island (1986 film) =

1986 film

- Film poster
- French: L'île au trésor
- Directed by: Raúl Ruiz
- Written by: Raúl Ruiz
- Based on: Treasure Island by Robert Louis Stevenson
- Produced by: Paulo Branco; António Vaz da Silva
- Starring: Melvil Poupaud; Vic Tayback; Martin Landau; Anna Karina; Jean-Pierre Léaud; Lou Castel; Sheila
- Cinematography: Acácio de Almeida
- Edited by: Valeria Sarmiento
- Music by: Jorge Arriagada
- Distributed by: Cannon Films
- Release date: 1986
- Running time: 115 minutes
- Countries: United Kingdom; France; United States
- Language: English

Treasure Island (French: L'île au trésor) is a 1986 fabulist metafiction film directed by Chilean filmmaker Raúl Ruiz, which was screened in the Un Certain Regard section of the 1991 Cannes Film Festival. French, British and American companies funded Ruiz's obscure and complex adaptation of the classic 1883 coming-of-age adventure novel by Robert Louis Stevenson. Treasure Island stars a young Melvil Poupaud, a familiar face in Ruiz's filmography, alongside popular veteran actors such as Martin Landau, Anna Karina and Jean-Pierre Léaud.

The film's play on the traditional narrative of an iconic and frequently dramatized story is very representative of Ruiz' oneiric approach and style. Ruiz takes his fondness for cartography to a new level with Stevenson's narrative, making the book into a map to the treasure in this rendition.

== Plot ==
A shabby hotel is run by a drunk and his wife; they take in as few guests as possible. A man arrives there, and asks to be called "Captain." He knows the couple.

While tending to guests on the terrace, a strange blind man approaches the couple's son, Jonathan. The man wants to speak about the Captain.

The Captain attempts to bribe Jonathan into not sharing that he is staying there; Jonathan responds that it is too late. As his mother watches, the Captain drugs him. While drugged, Jonathan sleepwalks and cannot tell if he is awake or asleep. He sees a fight between the Captain and his father. His mother screams at him to go back to sleep.

After fully regaining consciousness, Jonathan ventures to a cave where he can retreat for days at time. He looks outside to see the blind man dancing. He returns to the hotel, where a man, Midas, sits at a typewriter. Midas seems to know everything about Jonathan. The blind man then appears and tries to grab Jonathan.

Jonathan's mother and the Captain are later seen giggling and holding each other; they seem to be lovers. They begin to drunkenly mock Jonathan's father, as Jonathan watches.

Jonathan leaves the hotel. He eventually runs into Silver, a man on the side of the road. He offers Jonathan a place to stay and a ride. Silver also knows everything about him. As he heads off to sleep, a person in the hall claims to be Jonathan's father. Silver makes the stranger leave. Off to bed, Jonathan grabs a book: Treasure Island. The book accounts for Silver's entire secret library.

Jonathan returns home, where his father's funeral is in progress. Jonathan then awakes to a room of people. He seems to have fainted at the funeral. A doctor there purposefully scares Jonathan. His mother watches, laughing. She urges the doctor to stop, believing that Jonathan's memory is gone. She claims that Jonathan thinks that other people are his father. The guests are the doctor, a millionaire, and the Captain along with a new family member, Aunt Helen. Everyone is reading Treasure Island.

The Captain has now gone insane. He refuses to see anyone but Jonathan. While visiting the Captain, Jonathan sees that he has annotated Treasure Island. In the book, there is a character named Silver, and his lines echo that of the Silver he met days earlier. The Captain is dying. He asks Jonathan to promise to read every book (all the treasure islands) carefully, because the entire fate of the western world depends on it. Before dying, the Captain says that he is Jonathan's actual father.

Jonathan begins to prepare for a trip in search of treasure. There is now a new Captain, who is French. The group includes the doctor, a millionaire, and Silver, among others. There are two groups, Silver's and the French Captain's. Jonathan is continually pestered by Silver to come to his side. Jonathan refuses and stays with the French Captain. He then overhears Silver saying that all of the other crew must go. The Captain and his crew abandon ship in a rowboat.

The group eventually reaches another ship, where Silver and his crew are already there as hostages, along with Helen. The group eventually finds Treasure Island. One of the men on the crew is the man from Silver's house who claimed to be Jonathan's father. Jonathan, below deck with his group, deceives him by bringing up this topic, and the group manages to flee.

They land on Skeleton Beach, giving space between themselves and Silver. They decide to attack after lunch. During the battle, there are no bullets; it is all fake.

Jonathan eventually takes control of the ship. On board, his ersatz father, Israel Hands, loses his hands when trying to overtake Jonathan.

Jonathan eventually is captured and brought to Silver. A man later appears and begins to explain Treasure Island. He explains that there is a book, and a game. The game was invented by Silver, who is a professor. Silver then introduces the man as an expert in limited game theory. Silver goes on to explain that the whole world is playing a game that abides by sacred rules. Whoever discovers these rules can control the world.

Then Helen and the doctor appear, and the expert is shot. Silver, distraught because of this, comments that he was his "best Silver" ever, the best Jim Hawkins, and that he was better than Jonathan. Helen then shoots Silver.

A man named Ben Gunn then explains that this game was a failure and that they will play again. Jonathan then realizes that all of these people have played before. Jonathan agrees to play again, implying that he will be Jim Hawkins, and runs on the beach while the dead are being buried. Ben then kills Jonathan, not wanting him to play again, for he is the only Jim Hawkins.

== Cast ==
- Melvil Poupaud as Jim Hawkins / Jonathan
- Martin Landau as Old Captain
- Vic Tayback as Long John Silver
- Lou Castel as Doctor / Father
- Jeffrey Kime as Timothy (The Squire)
- Anna Karina as Mother
- Sheila as Aunt
- Jean-François Stévenin as Israel Hands (The Rat)
- Charles Schmidt as The blind man
- Jean-Pierre Léaud as Midas
- Yves Afonso as French captain
- Pedro Armendáriz Jr. as Mendoza

== Reception ==
The film was shown at the 1991 Cannes Film Festival but did not win any awards. Although it was more popular in Europe, it was not the hit that its American investors were hoping for.

== Themes ==
Ruiz is renowned for making complex stories, without following the traditional narrative structure. Unlike his other films, Treasure Island uses the structure and characters of the novel. When re-reading the book he found that the structure was stronger than the material. Ruiz found that life is made up of these types of stories:

“We play amidst these stories, sometimes being involved in two or three of them at once. In one you’re a hero, in another a secondary character. These scripts are the society in which we live-…” ~Raúl Ruiz

These ideas are obvious towards the end of the film, when the game is introduced. Jonathan/Jim is actually asked which character he will play next. This philosophy of Ruiz' foreshadows role-playing gaming, which began to take off shortly after this film was made. The idea that we are all playing a game, and are all different characters at points in our stories is one of the main themes of the movie.

Cartography is also an important theme in Treasure Island, as well as many of Ruiz's other films. The entire film is based on the idea that the book is a map to the treasure. The importance of cartography for Ruiz is not only his complex background as a Chilean exile, but in his reinvention of the way stories are told. In this film much time is spent developing the idea that even a familiar story can be told in many different ways
