= Anna Karina =

Danish and French actress (1940–2019)

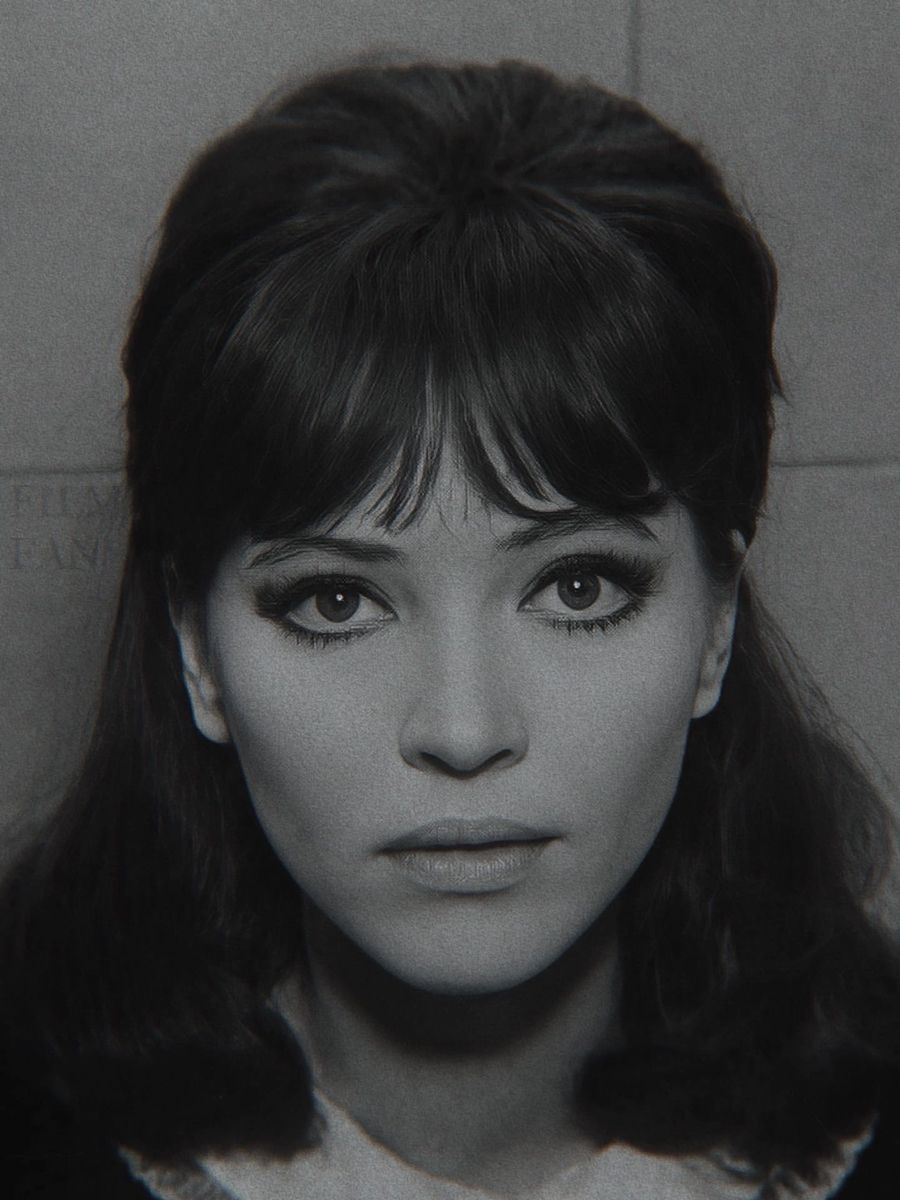
- Karina in Alphaville (1965)
- Born: Hanne Karin Blarke Bayer; 22 September 1940; Frederiksberg, Denmark
- Died: 14 December 2019 (aged 79); Paris, France
- Resting place: Père Lachaise Cemetery
- Citizenship: Denmark, France
- Occupations: Actor; film director; writer; singer; model
- Years active: 1959–2019
- Spouses: Jean-Luc Godard (m. 1961; div. 1965) Pierre Fabre (m. 1968; div. 1974) Daniel Duval (m. 1978; div. 1981) Dennis Berry (m. 1982)

Anna Karina (born Hanne Karin Blarke Bayer; 22 September 1940 – 14 December 2019) was a Danish and French film actress, director, writer, model, and singer. She was an early collaborator of French New Wave director Jean-Luc Godard, her first husband, performing in several of his films, including The Little Soldier (1960), A Woman Is a Woman (1961), My Life to Live (1962), Bande à part (Band of Outsiders; 1964), Pierrot le Fou (1965), and Alphaville (1965). For her performance in A Woman Is a Woman, Karina won the Silver Bear Award for Best Actress at the Berlin Film Festival.

In 1972, Karina set up a production company for Vivre ensemble (1973), her directorial debut, which screened in the Critics' Week lineup at the 26th Cannes Film Festival. She also directed the French-Canadian film Victoria (2008). In addition to her work in cinema, she worked as a singer and wrote several novels.

Karina was an icon of 1960s cinema, and referred to as the "effervescent free spirit of the French New Wave, with all of the scars that the position entails". The New York Times described her as "one of the screen's great beauties and an enduring symbol of the French New Wave".

== Early life ==
Hanne Karin Blarke Bayer was born on 22 September 1940 in Frederiksberg, Denmark, during the German occupation of the Second World War. Her mother was a dress shop owner and her father was a ship captain who left the family a year after she was born.

She lived with her maternal grandparents for four years, then spent the next four years in foster care before returning to live with her mother and her abusive step-father when she was eight. As a child, her mother belittled her appearance, and told her that her eyes and forehead were too big. She has described her childhood, as "terribly wanting to be loved", as she felt unwanted and unloved. She made numerous attempts to run away from home, trying to find boats that would take her to Sweden or America. She dreamt of becoming an actor from a young age and wanted to attend drama school but at the time the age requirement for Danish drama schools was 21.

As a student, she rarely attended school and when she achieved good grades in her certificate exams, her school refused to believe she had done so without cheating. The injustice made her leave school at the age of 14.

== Career ==
=== Beginnings and modeling ===
After leaving school, she went on to find work as a lift operator in a department store and as an assistant to an illustrator. She began her professional career in Denmark, where she sang in cabarets and worked as a model playing in commercials. Aged 14, she was spotted in the street by Ib Schmedes, who cast her as the lead in his forty-minute short film Pigen og skoene (The Girl and The Shoes, 1959), which won a prize at Cannes. However, as things did not seem to be going well at home, where one evening her step-father beat her very badly, she decided to leave. With the equivalent of $15, which she'd received from her grandfather, she hitchhiked to Paris. She has said that although she grew up in Denmark, she was "fascinated" by France and after traveling to Paris at age 14, she wanted to go back and live there.

In the summer of 1958, aged 17, Karina arrived in Paris. With only 10,000 francs and unable to speak French, she struggled to find a place to stay and had to ask neighborhood priests for somewhere to sleep. Finally, a young priest found her a small room on the rue Pavée, just behind the Bastille. One day, while starving and wandering through Paris, she found herself in Saint-Germain-des-Prés. She sat down at Les Deux Magots café, where a woman called Catherine Harlé approached her and asked her if she would be willing to do some photos. Suspicious at first, Karina finally agreed when she found out it was a professional shoot for the French newspaper Jours de France. After finishing the shoot, Harlé, although telling Karina that she wasn't very talented, gave her some contacts.

She began to work as a model and eventually became successful, posing for several magazines, including Elle, and meeting Pierre Cardin and Coco Chanel. Karina has said that when she met Chanel on the set of the Elle photoshoot, Chanel told her: "I believe you want to be an actress… You need to learn French. What's your name little girl?" "Hanne Karin Bayer." Karina replied. And Chanel said: "No: Anna Karina – call yourself that." It was deliberately coined to evoke Leo Tolstoy's novel Anna Karenina. She also appeared in commercials for products such as Coca-Cola, Pepsodent, and Palmolive. She was still underage but received enough money to find herself a place to stay. And as she still wanted to attend drama school, she sat in movie theaters and watched French movies to teach herself the language.

=== Film ===
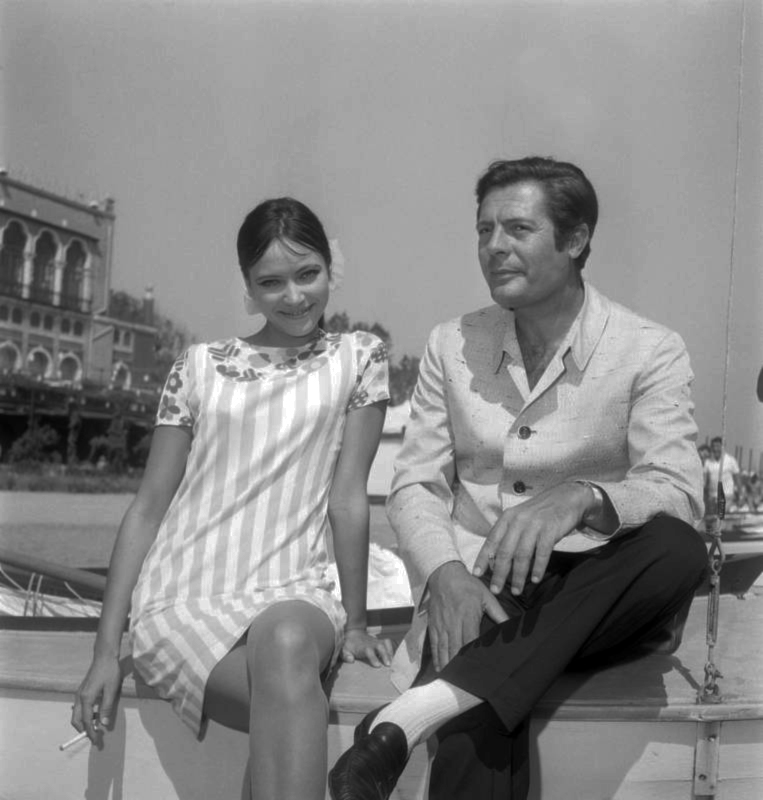
Karina with Marcello Mastroianni in 1967

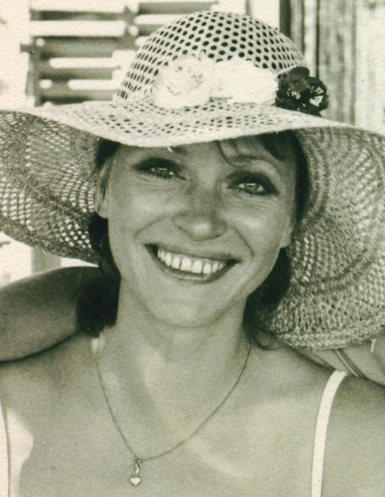
Karina in 1977

Jean-Luc Godard, then a film critic for Cahiers du cinéma, first saw Karina in the Palmolive adverts in which she posed in bathtubs. He was casting his debut feature film Breathless (À bout de souffle, 1960), and offered her a small part in it, but she refused when he mentioned that there would be a nude scene. When Godard questioned her refusal, mentioning her apparent nudity in the Palmolive ads, she is said to have replied, "Are you mad? I was wearing a bathing suit in those ads—the soapsuds went up to my neck. It was in your mind that I was undressed." In the end, the character Godard reserved for Karina did not appear in the film. Godard offered her a role in The Little Soldier (Le Petit Soldat, not released until 1963) which concerns contentious French actions during the Algerian War. She played a pro-Algerian activist. Karina, then still under 21, had to persuade her estranged mother to sign the contract for her. The film was immediately controversial, outlawed from French theaters for its content referencing the Algerian War.

After the filming of The Little Soldier, Godard wanted Karina to give up acting, but when Michel Deville offered her the leading role in his next movie, Tonight or Never (Ce soir ou jamais), she accepted immediately, and despite his displeasure Godard drove her to the studio each morning; it was after seeing the rushes of Deville's movie, in which she played an ambitious actress and had to learn her lines before shooting, that he decided to cast her in his own next movie, A Woman Is a Woman (Une femme est une femme, 1961).

As Angela in A Woman Is a Woman, Karina's role was as an unattached striptease dancer who nevertheless wishes to have a child and daydreams about appearing in MGM musicals. Her school-girl costume emulated Leslie Caron in Gigi (1958), worn even while performing her act. Karina won the Silver Bear for Best Actress at the 11th Berlin International Film Festival for her performance. In all, Karina appeared in eight films directed by Godard, including My Life to Live (Vivre sa vie, 1962), Band of Outsiders (Bande à part, 1964) Pierrot le Fou and Alphaville (both 1965). In Pierrot le Fou, Karina's character is on the run with her ex-boyfriend, while in Alphaville, a science-fiction film often equated to Bladerunner, Karina's role requires her to have difficulty saying the phrase "I love you." The last film in the sequence was Made in USA (1966). Anne Billson, in an article querying the concept of the female muse, wrote that Godard in his films with Karina "seems to have trouble conceiving that the female experience revolves around anything other than prostitution, duplicity, or wanting babies." Karina herself did not object to being described as Godard's muse: "Maybe it's too much, it sounds so pompous. But of course I'm always very touched to hear people say that. Because Jean-Luc gave me a gift to play all of those parts."

Her career flourished, with Karina appearing in dozens of films through the 1960s, including: The Nun (La Religieuse, 1966), directed by Jacques Rivette; Luchino Visconti's The Stranger (Lo straniero, 1967); the George Cukor/Joseph Strick collaboration Justine (1969); and Tony Richardson's Laughter in the Dark (1969). She continued to work steadily into the 1970s, with roles in Christian de Chalonge's The Wedding Ring (L'Alliance, 1970), Andre Delvaux's Rendezvous at Bray (Rendez-vous à Bray, also 1971), The Salzburg Connection (1972), and Franco Brusati's Bread and Chocolate (Pane e cioccolata, 1973).

In 1972, she set up the production company for Living Together (Vivre ensemble, 1973), her directorial debut, in which she also acted. The film screened in the Critics' Week lineup at the 26th Cannes Film Festival.

She starred in Rainer Werner Fassbinder's Chinese Roulette (Chinesisches Roulette, 1976); Fassbinder allegedly wrote the film for her and Ulli Lommel, her partner at the time. She later wrote and acted in Last Song (1987) and appeared in Up, Down, Fragile (Haut bas fragile, 1995), directed by Jacques Rivette, and sang in The Truth About Charlie (2002), a remake of the film Charade (1963).

Karina wrote, directed and starred in Victoria (2008), a musical road movie filmed in Montreal and Saguenay–Lac-Saint-Jean, Quebec. The lead character, played by Karina, has amnesia. Richard Kuipers praised it in Variety as "a pleasant gambol through the backwoods of Quebec."

Karina's final film appearance was in Quantum Cowboys (2022), directed by Geoff Marslett.

=== Music and writing ===
Karina maintained a singing career. At the end of the 1960s, she scored a major hit with "Sous le soleil exactement" and "Roller Girl" by Serge Gainsbourg. Both songs are from the TV musical comedy Anna (1967), by the film director Pierre Koralnik, in which she sings seven songs alongside Gainsbourg and Jean-Claude Brialy. Karina recorded the album Une histoire d'amour with Philippe Katerine, followed by a concert tour. In 2005, she released Chansons de films, a collection of songs sung in movies.

Karina wrote four novels: Vivre ensemble (1973), Golden City (1983), On n'achète pas le soleil (1988), and Jusqu'au bout du hasard (1998).

== Personal life ==
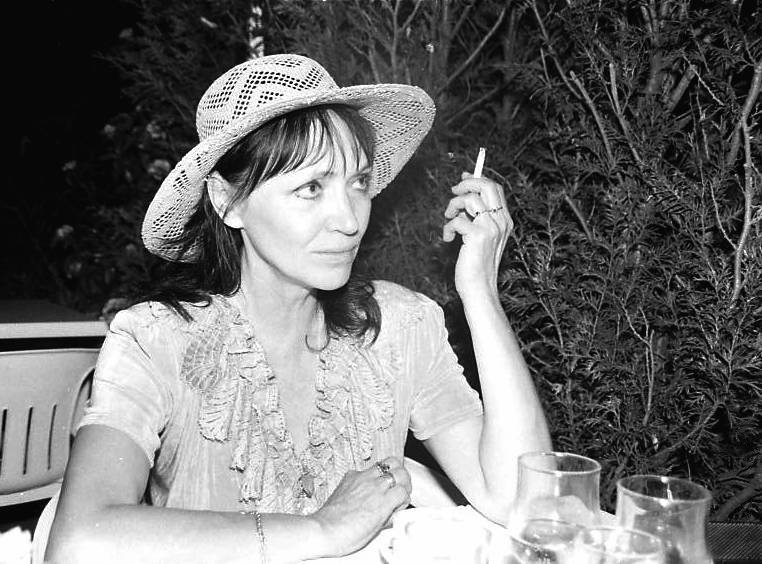
Karina in 1994

While working together on Le Petit Soldat, as the crew were having a dinner party in Lausanne, Godard wrote a note and gave it to Karina, saying: "I love you, come and meet me at midnight in a café called Café de la Prez." At the time Karina was in a relationship but she had already fallen in love with Godard so she ended her relationship with her then-boyfriend and went to meet Godard. They began a relationship and married in 1961. Eventually, Karina served as a cinematic muse to Godard, appearing in eight of his films, including Alphaville, Bande à part, and Pierrot le Fou, during their five-year marriage and after. Karina liked being the muse, stating in 2016: "How could I not be honoured? Maybe it's too much, it sounds so pompous. But of course I'm always very touched to hear people say that. Because Jean-Luc gave me a gift to play all of those parts. It was like Pygmalion, you know? I was Eliza Doolittle and he was the teacher." The couple became, according to The Independent, "one of the most celebrated pairings of the 1960s." A writer for Filmmaker magazine called their work "arguably the most influential body of work in the history of cinema." Despite the critical success, their relationship behind the scenes was described as tumultuous; they fought on film sets, she fell ill several times, attempted suicide and was subsequently hospitalized in a mental health institution. Godard was often absent without explanation. He was also very jealous, questioned Karina's acting ability and told her: "How are you going to say these lines? They're so terrible! It's a comedy, you are never going to be able to do that."

One Godard film from this period which does not feature Karina, Contempt (1963) starring Brigitte Bardot wearing a black wig which resembles Karina's dark hair, is said to be based on their difficult relationship. The couple divorced in 1965.

Karina said in spring 2016 that she and Godard no longer spoke to each other. She described the relationship in an interview with W magazine:

It was all very exciting from the beginning. Of course we have a great love story and all that, but we were so different. He was 10 years older than me. He was very strange. He would go away and come back three weeks later... It was difficult, and I was a young girl, not even 21—at the time Godard was 30. I know he didn't mean to hurt me, but he did. He was never there, he was never coming back, and I never knew where he was. He drove me a bit crazy.

After divorcing Godard, Karina remarried three times; she was married to French actors Pierre Fabre from 1968 to 1974 and Daniel Duval from 1978 to 1981, and to American film director Dennis Berry from 1982 until her death.

Karina died at the age of 79 on Saturday, 14 December 2019, at a hospital in Paris. According to her agent, Laurent Balandras, the cause of death was cancer. However, her husband Dennis Berry said that the cause was not cancer, but a complication following a muscular rupture.

== Legacy ==
Karina is regularly considered an icon of 1960s cinema, a staple in French New Wave cinema, as well as a style icon. The Guardian described her as an "effervescent free spirit of the French new wave." The New York Times described her style as looking like a schoolgirl in her acting roles, regardless of whether she was playing a streetwalker or a terrorist. Her signature look was her dark hair, wispy bangs, heavy eyeliner and school uniform of primary-coloured sailor-uniform tops, knee socks, plaid headwear such as berets and boaters. Refinery29 wrote that "her 60s French girl style – think sailor dresses, tartan, long socks, and hats – and mesmerizing doe-eyed beauty mean she continues to be referenced today by the super-stylish."

== Honours and awards ==
- Chevalier of the Order of the Legion of Honour (2018)
- Commandeur of the Ordre des Arts et des Lettres (1996)

== Filmography ==
Year	Title	Role	Director	Notes
1961	Tonight or Never	Valérie	Michel Deville	
1961	A Woman Is a Woman	Angela Récamier	Jean-Luc Godard	
1962	Cléo from 5 to 7	The Fiancée	Agnès Varda	episode: "Les fiancés du pont Macdonald"
1962	She'll Have to Go	Toni	Robert Asher	
1962	Sun in Your Eyes	Dagmar	Jacques Bourdon	
1962	My Life to Live	Nana Kleinfrankenheim	Jean-Luc Godard	
1962	Three Fables of Love	Colombe	Hervé Bromberger	segment: "Le corbeau et le renard"
1963	The Little Soldier	Veronica Dreyer	Jean-Luc Godard	
1963	Shéhérazade	Shéhérazade	Pierre Gaspard-Huit	
1963	Sweet and Sour	La pauvre Ginette	Jacques Baratier	
1964	Band of Outsiders	Odile	Jean-Luc Godard	
1964	Circle of Love	Rose / The Chambermaid	Roger Vadim	
1964	All About Loving	Hélène	Jean Aurel	
1965	The Thief of Tibidabo	Maria	Maurice Ronet	
1965	Alphaville	Natascha von Braun	Jean-Luc Godard	
1965	The Camp Followers	Elenitza Karaboris	Valerio Zurlini	
1965	Un mari à un prix fixe	Béatrice Reinhoff	Claude de Givray	
1965	Pierrot le Fou	Marianne Renoir	Jean-Luc Godard	
1966	The Nun	Suzanne Simonin	Jacques Rivette	
1966	Made in USA	Paula Nelson	Jean-Luc Godard	
1967	Anna	Anna	Pierre Koralnik	TV movie
1967	Zärtliche Haie	Elena / Costa	Michel Deville	
1967	The Oldest Profession	Natasha / Eleanor Romeovich, Hostess 703	Jean-Luc Godard	segment: "Anticipation"
1967	Lamiel	Lamiel	Jean Aurel	
1967	The Stranger	Marie Cardona	Luchino Visconti	
1968	The Magus	Anne	Guy Green	
1968	Before Winter Comes	Maria	J. Lee Thompson	
1969	Man on Horseback	Elisabeth Kohlhaas	Volker Schlöndorff	
1969	Laughter in the Dark	Margot	Tony Richardson	
1969	Justine	Melissa	George Cukor and Joseph Strick	
1969	Dämonische Leinwand		Klaus Wyborny	
1970	The Time to Die	The Unnamed Woman	André Farwagi	
1970	The Wedding Ring	Jeanne	Christian de Chalonge	
1971	Rendezvous at Bray	She (The Waitress)	André Delvaux	
1971	Carlos	Clara	Hans W. Geißendörfer	TV movie
1972	The Salzburg Connection	Anna Bryant	Lee H. Katzin	
1973	Vivre ensemble	Julie Anderson	Anna Karina	
1974	Bread and Chocolate	Elena	Franco Brusati	
1974	Morel's Invention	Faustine	Emidio Greco	
1975	The Musician Killer	Louise	Benoît Jacquot	
1976	Scrambled Eggs	Clara Dutilleul	Joël Santoni	
1976	Chinese Roulette	Irene Cartis	Rainer Werner Fassbinder	
1978	Surprise Sock	Nathalie	Jean-François Davy	
1978	Just like Home	Anna	Márta Mészáros	
1978	Ausgerechnet Bananen	Natascha	Ulli Lommel	
1979	The Story of a Mother	Christine Olsen	Claus Weeke	
1980	Charlotte, Tell Your Mother that I Love Her	Stéphane	Aly Borgini	
1983	Vincent's Friend	Eleonore	Pierre Granier-Deferre	
1984	Ave Maria	Berthe Granjeux	Jacques Richard	
1985	Treasure Island	The Mother	Raoul Ruiz	
1987	Last Song	Susan	Dennis Berry	
1987	Last Summer in Tangiers	Myrrha, a cabaret singer	Alexandre Arcady	
1987	Cayenne Palace	Lola	Alain Maline	
1988	The Abyss	Catherine	André Delvaux	
1990	The Man Who Wanted to Be Guilty	Edith	Ole Roos	
1995	Up, Down, Fragile	Sarah	Jacques Rivette	
1996	Chloé	Katia	Dennis Berry	TV movie
2002	The Truth About Charlie	Karina	Jonathan Demme	
2003	I, Cesar	Gloria	Richard Berry	
2008	Victoria	Victoria	Anna Karina	
2022	Quantum Cowboys	Blacky's Memory	Geoff Marslett	Final film role
2025	Soredemo Ore wa, Tsuma to Shitai		Shin Adachi	3 episodes
