= List of LGBTQ-related films of 1980 =

This is a list of lesbian, gay, bisexual, transgender or queer-related films released in 1980. It contains theatrically released films that deal with important gay, lesbian, bisexual, transgender or queer characters or issues and may have same-sex romance or relationships as a plot device.

== Films ==
Title	Director	Country	Genre	Cast	Notes
Afternoon Breezes	Hitoshi Yazaki	Japan	Drama	Setsuko Aya, Naomi Ito	a.k.a. Kazetachi no Gogo
La Cage aux Folles II	Edouard Molinaro	France; Italy	Comedy	Michel Serrault, Ugo Tognazzi, Marcel Bozzuffi, Michel Galabru, Paola Borboni, Benny Luke, Giovanni Vettorazzo, Glauco Onorato, Roberto Bisacco, Gianrico Tondinelli, Giorgio Cerioni, Nazzareno Natale, Antonio Francioni, Stelio Candelli, Mark Bodin and Tom Felleghy	
Can't Stop the Music	Nancy Walker	United States	Musical comedy	Steve Guttenberg, Valerie Perrine, Bruce Jenner, Paul Sand, Tammy Grimes, Alex Briley, David Hodo, Glenn Hughes, Randy Jones, Felipe Rose, Ray Simpson, June Havoc, Barbara Rush, Altovise Davis, Marilyn Sokol, Russell Nype, Jack Weston, Leigh Taylor-Young and Dick Patterson	
Cruising	William Friedkin	United States	Crime, drama, thriller	Al Pacino, Paul Sorvino, Karen Allen, Richard Cox, Don Scardino, Joe Spinell, Jay Acovone, Randy Jurgensen, Barton Heyman, Gene Davis, Arnaldo Santana, Larry Atlas, Allan Miller, Sonny Grosso, Edward O'Neil, Michael Aronin, James Remar, William Russ, Mike Starr, Leo Burmester, Henry Judd Baker, Steve Inwood, Keith Prentice, Leland Starnes and Powers Boothe	Based on the novel of the same name by New York Times reporter Gerald Walker
Curse	Osman F. Seden	Turkey	Drama	Bülent Ersoy, Mine Mutlu, Kadir Savun, Hakki Çagdas, Sermin Ölçmen, Cem Erman, Turgut Özatay, Diler Saraç, Osman F. Seden (as Osman Seden), Hüseyin Kasif, Necdet Kökes, Mustafa Yavuz, Nubar Terziyan, Hakki Kivanç and Giray Alpan	a.k.a. Beddua
Dear Boys	Paul de Lussanet	Netherlands	Comedy, drama	Hugo Metsers, Hans Dagelet, Bill van Dijk, Albert Mol, Pleuni Touw, Marina de Graaf, Astrid Nijgh, Gerard Cox, Jan Hopmann, Hans Cornelissen, Jaap Hoogstra, Jan Staal, Mevrouw de Meijer, Wim Bary and Herman Ouwersloot	a.k.a. Lieve jongens, based on novels by Gerard Reve
Two Lions in the Sun	Claude Faraldo	France	Drama, fantasy	Jean-François Stévenin, Jean-Pierre Sentier, Catherine Lachens, Jean-Pierre Tailhade, Martine Sarcey, Michel Robin, Valérie Kling, Alain Doutey, Jeanne Herviale, Nathalie Jadot, Guilhaine Dubos, Mario D'Alba, Dominique Bonnaud and Georges Trillat	a.k.a. Deux lions au soleil
Dressed to Kill	Brian De Palma	United States	Thriller	Michael Caine, Angie Dickinson, Nancy Allen, Keith Gordon, Dennis Franz, David Margulies, Ken Baker, Susanna Clemm, Brandon Maggart and William Finley	
Él y él	Eduardo Manzanos Brochero	Spain	Drama	Antonio Escudero, María Luisa Ponte (as Mª Luisa Ponte), Carmen Utrilla, Aparicio Rivero, Alejandro Urquía, Montserrat Calvo, Fernando Huesca, Joaquin Solano, Teresa Mur, José Luis López Vázquez, Mónica Randall, Lola Herrera, Álvaro de Luna and Sancho Gracia	
Fame	Alan Parker	United States	Musical, drama	Irene Cara, Lee Curreri, Laura Dean, Antonia Franceschi, Paul McCrane, Barry Miller, Gene Anthony Ray, Maureen Teefy, Albert Hague, Anne Meara, Joanna Merlin, Jim Moody, Debbie Allen, Eddie Barth, Boyd Gaines, Tresa Hughes, Steve Inwood, Richard Belzer, Bill Britten, Isaac Mizrahi, Sal Piro, Michael DeLorenzo and Meg Tilly	One of the main characters is gay and depicted sympathically
Giselle	Victor di Mello	Brazil	Drama	Alba Valeria, Carlo Mossy, Maria Lúcia Dahl, Nildo Parente, Ricardo Faria, Monique Lafond, Celso Faria, Zózimo Bulbul, Vinícius Salvatori, Luciano Sabino, Iara Jati, J. Queiroz, Mario Ludgero, Esmeralda de Lima and Hudson Malta Santos	
Happy Birthday, Gemini	Richard Benner	United States	Comedy	Madeline Kahn, Rita Moreno, Robert Viharo	
Hide and Seek	Dan Wolman	Israel	Drama	Gila Almagor, Benyamin Armon, Chaim Hadaya, Efrat Lavie, Rahel Shor and Doron Tavory	a.k.a. Machboim
Immacolata e Concetta	Salvatore Piscicelli	Italy	Drama	Ida Di Benedetto, Marcella Michelangeli, Tommaso Bianco, Lucio Allocca, Lucia Ragni, Biancamaria Mastrominico, Nina De Padova, Linda Moretti, Antonio Ferrante, Berto Lama and Cetty Sommella	Internationally released as Immacolata and Concetta: The Other Jealousy
Ixe	Lionel Soukaz	France	Short, drama	Jean-François B., François Dantchev, Farida, Karine, Hervé Leymarie, Lionel Soukaz, Verveine, Philippe Veschi and York	
The Kiss	Bruno Barreto	Brazil	Crime, Drama	Tarcísio Meira, Ney Latorraca, Lídia Brondi, Christiane Torloni, Daniel Filho, Oswaldo Loureiro, Ligia Diniz, Pedro Paulo Rangel, Thelma Reston (as Telma Reston), Flávio São Thiago, Nelson Caruso, Renato Coutinho, Lícia Magna, Xuxa Lopes and Estelita Bell	a.k.a. O Beijo no Asfalto, based on the play of the same name by Nelson Rodrigues
The Lady Banker	Francis Girod	France	Drama	Romy Schneider, Marie-France Pisier, Claude Brasseur, Jean-Claude Brialy, Jean Carmet, Jean-Louis Trintignant, Jacques Fabbri, Daniel Mesguich, Noëlle Chatelet, Daniel Auteuil, Thierry Lhermitte, Alan Adair, François-Régis Bastide, Arnaud Boisseau and Yves Brainville	The female protagonist is explicitly depicted as bisexual.
The Last Metro	François Truffaut	France	Drama	Catherine Deneuve, Gérard Depardieu, Jean Poiret, Heinz Bennent , Andréa Ferreol, Paulette Dubost, Sabine Haudepin, Jean-Louis Richard	Features two lesbian supporting characters.
Nijinsky	Herbert Ross	United States	Biography, drama	Alan Bates, George de la Peña, Leslie Browne	Based on the later life and career of Vaslav Nijinsky
Pepi, Luci, Bom	Pedro Almodóvar	Spain	Comedy	Carmen Maura, Eva Siva, Alaska (Olvido Gara), Félix Rotaeta, Concha Grégori, Kiti Manver, Cecilia Roth, Fabio McNamara (Fabio de Miguel), Julieta Serrano and Cristina Sánchez Pascual	
Pixote	Héctor Babenco	Brazil	Action, crime, drama	Fernando Ramos da Silva, Jorge Julião, Gilberto Moura, Edilson Lino, Zenildo Oliveira Santos, Claudio Bernardo, Israel Feres David, Jose Nilson Martin dos Stos, Marília Pêra, Jardel Filho, Rubens de Falco, Elke Maravilha, Tony Tornado, Beatriz Segall and João José Pompeo	Based on the novel A Infância dos Mortos by José Louzeiro
Le Rebelle	Gérard Blain	France	Drama	Patrick Norbert, Michel Subor, Isabelle Rosais, Jean-Jacques Aublanc, Françoise Michaud, Alain Jérôme, Robert Delarue, Germaine Ledoyen, Monique Gilliot, Maurice Rollet and Hervé Claude	
Richard's Things	Anthony Harvey	United Kingdom	Drama	Liv Ullmann, Amanda Redman, Peter Burton	Based on the novel by Frederic Raphael, who also wrote the movie
Serial	Bill Persky	United States	Comedy	Martin Mull, Tuesday Weld	
Spetters	Paul Verhoeven	Netherlands	Drama	Hans van Tongeren, Renée Soutendijk, Toon Agterberg, Maarten Spanjer, Marianne Boyer, Peter Tuinman, Saskia van Basten-Batenburg (credited as Saskia Ten Batenburg), Yvonne Valkenburg, Ab Abspoel (credited as Albert Abspoel), Rudi Falkenhagen as Hans' Vader Hans Veerman, Ben Aerden, Kitty Courbois, Margot Keune, Jonna Koster, Gees Linnebank, Hugo Metsers, Peter Oosthoek, Jeroen Krabbé, Rutger Hauer, Bruni Heinke and Herman Vinck	
Squeeze	Richard Turner	New Zealand	Drama	Robert Shannon, Paul Eady, Donna Akersten	
Stir	Stephen Wallace	Australia	Action, Drama, Thriller	Bryan Brown, Max Phipps, Dennis Miller, Gary Waddell, Phil Motherwell, Michael Gow, Edward Robshaw, Tex Morton (as Robert 'Tex' Morton), Ray Marshall, Syd Heylen, Robert Noble, Paul Sonkkila, Keith Gallasch, Les Newcombe and James Marsh	
Times Square	Allan Moyle	United States	Musical, drama	Trini Alvarado, Robin Johnson, Tim Curry, Peter Coffield, Herbert Berghof, David Margulies, Anna Maria Horsford, Michael Margotta, J.C. Quinn, Tim Choate, Elizabeth Peña, Steve James and Jay Acovone	
Le Voyage en douce	Michel Deville	France	Drama	Dominique Sanda, Geraldine Chaplin, Jacques Zabor, Jean Crubelier, Valerie Masterson, Cécile Le Bailly, Jacqueline Parent, Jacques Pieiller, Liliane Rovère, Françoise Morhange, Frédéric Andréi, Christophe Malavoy, André Marcon, Catherine Le Dall, Hélène Garcia and Robin Camus	
Windows	Gordon Willis	United States	Drama, thriller	Talia Shire, Joseph Cortese, Elizabeth Ashley, Kay Medford, Michael Gorrin, Russell Horton, Michael Lipton, Rick Petrucelli, Ron Ryan, Linda Gillen, Tony DiBenedetto, Bryce Bond, Ken Chapin, Marty Greene, Bill Handy, Robert Hodge, Kyle Scott Jackson, Pat McNamara and Gerry Vichi	
Witches, Faggots, Dykes and Poofters	Digby Duncan	Australia	Documentary	Jude Kuring (Narrator)	
