= List of French films of 1980 =

List of films produced in France in 1980

A list of films produced in France in 1980.

Title	Director	Cast	Genre	Notes
AC/DC: Let There Be Rock	Eric Dionysius, Eric Mistler	Bon Scott, Angus Young, Malcolm Young, Phil Rudd, Cliff Williams	Documentary, concert	American-French co-production
Atlantic City	Louis Malle	Burt Lancaster, Susan Sarandon, Michel Piccoli	Crime, romance	Canadian-French co-production
Death Watch	Bertrand Tavernier	Romy Schneider, Harvey Keitel, Harry Dean Stanton	Science fiction	French-West German co-production
Every Man for Himself	Jean-Luc Godard	Isabelle Huppert, Jacques Dutronc, Nathalie Baye	Drama	French-Swiss co-production
Girls	Just Jaeckin	Anne Parillaud, Zoé Chauveau, Charlotte Walior	Drama	French-West German-Canadian co-production
Inspector Blunder	Claude Zidi	Coluche, Gérard Depardieu, Dominique Lavanant	Comedy	
Je vous aime	Claude Berri	Catherine Deneuve, Jean-Louis Trintignant, Gérard Depardieu	Drama	
La Boum	Claude Pinoteau	Claude Brasseur, Brigitte Fossey, Sophie Marceau	Comedy	
La Cage aux Folles II	Edouard Molinaro	Ugo Tognazzi, Michel Serrault, Gianni Frisoni	Comedy	French-Italian co-production
La Légion saute sur Kolwezi	Raoul Coutard	Bruno Creةer,ة Mimsy Farmer, Giuliano Gemma	Adventure	
The Last Metro	François Truffaut	Catherine Deneuve, Gérard Depardieu, Jean Poiret	Drama	
Le Guignolo	Georges Lautner	Jean-Paul Belmondo, Michel Galabru, Georges Géret	Comedy	French-Italian co-production
Le Roi et l'oiseau	Paul Grimault	Jean Martin, Pascal Mazzotti, Raymond Bussières, Agnès Viala	Children's/Family	
Le Voyage en douce	Michel Deville	Dominique Sanda, Geraldine Chaplin, Frédéric Andréi	Comedy-drama	
Loulou	Maurice Pialat	Isabelle Huppert, Gérard Depardieu, Guy Marchand	Drama, romance	
Mon oncle d'Amérique	Alain Resnais	Gérard Depardieu, Nicole Garcia, Roger-Pierre	Comedy-drama	
Night Games	Roger Vadim	Cindy Pickett, Barry Primus, Joanna Cassidy	Adult, drama	French-American co-production
Night of the Hunted	Jean Rollin	Brigitte Lahaie, Dominique Journet, Vincent Gardnere	Horror	
Public Telephone	Jean-Marie Périer	Téléphone	Documentary	
Three Men to Kill	Jacques Deray	Alain Delon, Dalila Di Lazzaro, Pierre Dux	Thriller	
Tusk	Alejandro Jodorowsky	Cyrielle Claire, Anton Diffring, Christopher Mitchum	Drama	
A Week's Vacation	Bertrand Tavernier	Nathalie Baye, Gérard Lanvin, Michel Galabru	Drama	
The Woman Cop	Yves Boisset	Miou-Miou, Jean-Marc Thibault, Jean-Pierre Kalfon	Thriller	
