= Jean-Pierre Kohut-Svelko =

French production designer and art director

- Born: 1946 (age 79–80); Paris, France
- Occupations: Production designer, art director
- Years active: 1972–2006

Jean-Pierre Kohut-Svelko (born in 1946) is a French production designer and art director. He is a César Award winner and 6 times nominee.

He worked several times with legend of the French cinema François Truffaut, Yves Robert, André Téchiné and Claude Miller.

== Filmography ==
Year	Title	Director	Notes	Rotten Tomatoes
1972	Such a Gorgeous Kid Like Me	François Truffaut		
1973	Pleure pas la bouche pleine!	Pascal Thomas		
1975	That Most Important Thing: Love	Andrzej Zulawski	Nominated - César Award for Best Production Design	
1975	The Story of Adele H.	François Truffaut (2)	Nominated - César Award for Best Production Design	93%
1976	Small Change	François Truffaut (3)		100%
1976	Police Python 357	Alain Corneau		
1976	Pardon Mon Affaire	Yves Robert		
1977	The Man Who Loved Women	François Truffaut (4)		89%
1977	La Menace	Alain Corneau (2)		
1977	Pardon Mon Affaire, Too!	Yves Robert (2)	Nominated - César Award for Best Production Design	
1977	At Night All Cats Are Crazy	Gérard Zingg		
1978	The Green Room	François Truffaut (5)		50%
1978	Perceval le Gallois	Éric Rohmer		
1979	Love on the Run	François Truffaut (6)		67%
1979	The Brontë Sisters	André Téchiné		
1979	Courage fuyons	Yves Robert (3)		
1980	The Last Metro	François Truffaut (7)	César Award for Best Production Design	89%
1981	The Prodigal Daughter	Jacques Doillon		
1981	The Woman Next Door	François Truffaut (8)		90%
1981	Hotel America	André Téchiné (2)		
1982	Guy de Maupassant	Michel Drach		
1983	Deadly Circuit	Claude Miller	Nominated - César Award for Best Production Design	
1984	Le vol du Sphinx	Laurent Ferrier		
1985	Urgence	Gilles Béhat		
1985	Rendez-vous	André Téchiné (3)		
1985	Une Femme ou Deux	Daniel Vigne		
1985	An Impudent Girl	Claude Miller (2)		
1986	Taxi Boy	Alain Page		
1986	I Love You	Marco Ferreri		
1986	Scene of the Crime	André Téchiné (4)		
1987	Ennemis intimes	Denis Amar	Nominated - César Award for Best Production Design	
1988	Les pyramides bleues	Arielle Dombasle		
1988	Ada dans la jungle	Gérard Zingg (2)		
1988	The Little Thief	Claude Miller (3)		67%
1992	The Accompanist	Claude Miller (4)		75%
1993	La nage indienne	Xavier Durringer		
1994	Le sourire	Claude Miller (5)		
1998	Class Trip	Claude Miller (6)		
2000	Le pique-nique de Lulu Kreutz	Didier Martiny		
2001	L'art (délicat) de la séduction	Richard Berry		
2001	Alias Betty	Claude Miller (7)		92%
2003	Little Lili	Claude Miller (8)		68%
2006	Je m'appelle Elisabeth	Jean-Pierre Améris		
