= The Lady Banker =

- French: La Banquière
- Directed by: Francis Girod
- Written by: Georges Conchon
- Produced by: Ariel Zeitoun
- Starring: Romy Schneider; Marie-France Pisier; Claude Brasseur; Jean-Claude Brialy; Jean Carmet; Jean-Louis Trintignant
- Cinematography: Bernard Zitzermann
- Edited by: Geneviève Winding
- Music by: Ennio Morricone
- Production companies: Partners Productions; France Régions 3; Gaumont; Société Française de Production
- Distributed by: Gaumont Distribution
- Release date: 27 August 1980
- Running time: 131 minutes
- Country: France
- Language: French
- Budget: ₣16,000,000 francs

The Lady Banker (1980) (original French title La Banquière), is a French drama film directed by Francis Girod, written by Georges Conchon and Francis Girod, starring Romy Schneider, Jean-Louis Trintignant, Marie-France Pisier, Claude Brasseur, Jean-Claude Brialy, Daniel Auteuil and Thierry Lhermitte; the music is by Ennio Morricone.

The film's screenplay, which was fictionalized, was inspired by the real life story of Marthe Hanau, who in the 1920s and the 1930s, famously defrauded many small investors of millions of francs by promoting stocks and securities of shell or non-existent companies belonging to her friends and business partners.

== Synopsis ==
The story is that of Emma Eckert, a Jewish woman with lesbian tendencies who adopted the son of one of her deceased former mistresses, founded a bank following a good stock market deal, lived in luxury, associated with influential people while being very popular, and took the brilliant Rémy Lecoudray as her lover.

The great banker Horace Vannister swore to destroy her and, using his influence with the government, had her imprisoned. In order to establish her innocence, she escaped with the help of Colette Lecoudray, was released following a change of government, but shot on Vannister's orders during a meeting where she proclaimed her innocence. She died in Colette's arms.

== Cast ==
- Romy Schneider as Emma Eckhert
- Marie-France Pisier as Colette Lecoudray
- Claude Brasseur as Largué
- Jean-Claude Brialy as Paul Cisterne
- Jean Carmet as Duvernet
- Jean-Louis Trintignant as Horace Vannister
- Jacques Fabbri as Moïse Nathanson
- Daniel Mesguich as Rémy Lecoudray
- Noëlle Chatelet as Camille Sowcroft
- Daniel Auteuil as Duclaux
- Thierry Lhermitte as Devoluy
- Alan Adair as Sir Charles
- François-Régis Bastide as Le ministre de la Justice
- Arnaud Boisseau as Armand
- Yves Brainville as Prefaille
- Isabelle Sadoyan as Sister Hermance

== Background ==
The screenplay was mostly based on a 1968 biography of Hanau by Dominique Desanti, titled, La Banquière des années folles. The scriptwriter, George Conchon, also published a book under the same title as the film, largely based on Desanti's biography. The role of Emma Eckhert was originally intended for Jeanne Moreau. It also stands out in French cinema history as one of the very few films featuring a woman banker in a leading role. The film cost 16 million francs to make, and there was a substantial promotional campaign. Many French critics disapproved of the American–like scale of the film with the film's lavish visual style sets, costumes, furniture and vintage cars.

== Release ==
The film opened 27 August 1980 on 16 screens in Paris and 12 suburban theatres and grossed $857,800 in its opening week. With nearly 2.5 million admissions in France, the film was a success and the 14th most successful the year of its release. It was broadcast on French television, and Studio Canal in France released it on DVD as part of a Romy Schneider box set, in the collection titled, Acteurs, actrices de légende. The film was entered in four categories at the 6th César Awards in 1981 but lost them all to The Last Metro.

== Reception ==
The authors of Romy Schneider: Princesse De L'écran opined it is a "film that can be read on several levels; some will see it as a comedy, a little grating with characters caricatured to the extreme, others on the contrary will perceive it as a real study of morals, a reflection on the power of money, politics and the press, but we don't feel Schneider is the right fit for the character, Jeanne Moreau would undoubtedly have been more credible."

Author Marion Hallet noted that "while Hanau committed suicide in her prison cell in 1935, Emma dies publicly in a spectacular ending, so theatrically staged and excessively performed that it verges towards Grand Guignol ... this scene is the pinnacle of a narrative that leads the viewers to side with the protagonist and see the cruel Horace Vannister and his clique as misogynistic, anti-Semitic, jealous villains who plot the defeat of a visionary and modern woman."

Film researcher Diane Gabrysiak opined that "in the end, while we might well appreciate Emma's motives, we remain aware of her dubious methods, making her both a villain and a person with good intentions, while the 'bad' characters hold negative opinions and use what seem to be horrendous measures towards Emma and her money: in this they are sullied, to a certain extent, by association with money too."

== See also ==
- Cinema of France
- List of French films of 1980
- List of French-language films
- List of LGBTQ-related films of 1980
- List of feature films with lesbian characters
