= The Woman in Red (1984 film) =

1984 film by Gene Wilder

- Theatrical release poster
- Directed by: Gene Wilder
- Screenplay by: Gene Wilder
- Story by: Yves Robert; Jean-Loup Dabadie
- Based on: Pardon Mon Affaire by Yves Robert
- Produced by: Victor Drai
- Starring: Gene Wilder; Charles Grodin; Joseph Bologna; Judith Ivey; Michael Huddleston; Kelly LeBrock; Gilda Radner
- Cinematography: Fred Schuler
- Edited by: Christopher Greenbury
- Music by: John Morris; Stevie Wonder
- Production company: Woman in Red Productions
- Distributed by: Orion Pictures
- Release date: August 15, 1984
- Running time: 86 minutes
- Country: United States
- Language: English
- Budget: $9 million
- Box office: $25.3 million

The Woman in Red is a 1984 American romantic comedy film, written and directed by Gene Wilder, based on the Yves Robert film Pardon Mon Affaire. Wilder stars as a married man who becomes infatuated with a beautiful woman, played by Kelly LeBrock in her acting debut, and tries to pursue an affair with her. It co-stars Charles Grodin, Gilda Radner, Joseph Bologna, and Judith Ivey. Upon its release by Orion Pictures, The Woman in Red grossed $25.3 million on a $9 million budget. The film won an Academy Award for Best Original Song for "I Just Called to Say I Love You", written and performed by Stevie Wonder.

== Plot ==
San Francisco advertising executive Theodore "Teddy" Pierce is amused by, then infatuated with, Charlotte, a woman whose red dress is billowed by a current of air rising from a ventilation grate, exposing her red satin panties. Teddy is married to Didi, but he cannot get Charlotte out of his mind. When his friend Joe, who has an affair of his own, is abandoned by his wife, Teddy gets cold feet and decides to forget it. Still, his friends Buddy, Joe, and Michael encourage him to pursue the affair. After meeting Charlotte again through his office, he tries to ask her for a date, but mistakenly phones Ms. Milner instead, a plain-looking colleague who is flattered by his interest.

Just when he is to leave for his date, Didi tells him that their neighbor told them to babysit their small boy. Stood up at the restaurant, Ms. Milner later gets her revenge by bending Teddy's car antenna and scratching his car. After Ms. Milner tries to make amends, Teddy realises that she is the one who got the memo for the date, not Charlotte. He flees, and once more Ms. Milner exacts her vengeance, this time by letting go of Teddy's car brake, causing him to crash his car. Ms. Milner later acts amicably with Teddy, because she already started seeing another colleague, much to Teddy's confusion. Charlotte later agrees to meet for dinner with Teddy after he steadfastly asks for one, but once again, his plans fail when he receives a call from Charlotte saying she is in Los Angeles working and asking him to meet her. He creates another charade by writing a fake telegram from work and sending it to himself, telling him to go to Los Angeles, but due to the airport being fogged in, his flight is detoured to San Diego.

Teddy ultimately does become acquainted with Charlotte, a British model, going horseback riding with her (after finding out she liked riding horses), and even inviting her out on what is supposed to be a date with his nanny, but turns out to be an early surprise party with his relatives and Didi. Teddy's friend Buddy, who goes along them lending his car and being a chauffeur after losing a bet with Teddy, rapidly creates an excuse so as to not arouse any suspicions. After Buddy, Joe and Michael create a ruse to take him to Charlotte, he radically alters his wardrobe and begins acting nonchalant to try to capture his love's interest.

Events come to a head in Charlotte's high-rise apartment, where she invites Teddy into her satin bed. He is thrilled, as he is finally about to consummate his fantasy, until her airline pilot husband suddenly comes home. Trying to escape, Teddy ends up on a ledge, where passersby below gather as they believe he is about to take his own life, all captured on live television. At home, Didi breaks down in tears as she sees Teddy on live television. After overhearing Charlotte having sex with her husband, he decides that the affair is not worth it and jumps off the window ledge, and waits to be caught by the firemen. While falling, Teddy sees an attractive newswoman who smiles at him, hinting at another pursuit of an affair.

== Cast ==
- Gene Wilder as Theodore Pierce
- Charles Grodin as Buddy
- Joseph Bologna as Joe
- Judith Ivey as Didi Pierce
- Michael Huddleston as Michael
- Kelly LeBrock as Charlotte
- Gilda Radner as Ms. Milner
- Kyle T. Heffner as Richard
- Michael Zorek as Mr. Milner
- Billy Beck as the bartender
- Kyra Stempel as Missy Pierce
- Robin Ignico as Becky Pierce
- Viola Kates Stimpson as Mama Dell
- Danny Wells as the waiter
- Buddy Silberman as Gilbert
- Monica Parker as Corinne
- Ernest Harada as the doorman
- Julann Griffin as Miss Griffin
- Sandra Wilder as blonde photographer
- Thom Mathews as Erik (uncredited)

== Production ==
=== Background ===
In 1975, Wilder released his directorial debut, The Adventure of Sherlock Holmes' Smarter Brother. The film was a financial success, and was followed in 1977 by The World's Greatest Lover. again, a financial success. Between the two movies, the French film Pardon Mon Affaire was released, as well as its sequel Pardon Mon Affaire, Too!.

'The Woman in Red' was Wilder's first solo directorial credit in seven years. During that time he starred in the films The Frisco Kid, Sunday Lovers, Stir Crazy & Hanky Panky.

While not the first movie to be given a PG-13 rating, it was the first to feature frontal (but brief) nudity, by Kelly LeBrock.

=== Filming ===
Principal photography began on October 10, 1983, under the working title Boys Will Be Boys, and was completed on December 19, 1983. According to the production notes, the rehabilitation of San Francisco's cable car system prompted Wilder to set the story in the city. Locations included Golden Gate Park, Telegraph Hill, the Palace of Fine Arts, the Bay Bridge and Nob Hill, with a Victorian house in Alamo Square standing in for the Pierces' home. The horseback-riding scene and the tennis match were filmed in Southern California, the latter at the Los Angeles Tennis Club in Hancock Park.

=== Music ===
The original motion picture soundtrack was composed by Stevie Wonder, with the exception of "It's More Than You" by Ben Bridges, and features performances by Wonder and Dionne Warwick. Wonder received an Academy Award for Best Original Song for the song "I Just Called to Say I Love You." The nomination drew scrutiny after Wonder told the New York Daily News that he had written the song seven years before the film was made; because Academy rules require a nominated song to be written specifically for the film, the Academy's music branch investigated. Wonder replied that the music had been "conceived" years earlier but did not become a "concrete song" until the film was completed, and the branch ruled that it qualified. The album reached number four on the US Billboard 200 chart, number one on the R&B Albums chart (for four weeks), and number two on the UK Albums Chart. It reached number one on the Italian, Spanish, and Swedish album charts.

== Release ==
The Woman in Red was released by Orion Pictures in the United States on August 15, 1984. In its opening weekend of August 17–19, the film grossed $3,159,811 from 1,065 theaters, ranking seventh at the North American box office; it rose to fifth place in its fourth and fifth weekends and finished with a domestic gross of $25.3 million.

=== Home media ===
The film was originally released on VHS and LaserDisc, and then DVD. In the U.S. and Canada Kino Lorber released The Woman in Red on Blu-ray in 2017 with a trailer and an audio commentary track by critic and filmmaker Jim Hemphill. In January 2019 a German Blu-ray was released. On November 27, 2023, Final Cut Entertainment released it on Blu-Ray in the UK for the first time.

== Reception ==
The film gained publicity for Kelly LeBrock, a real-life model making her screen debut, particularly for the skirt-and-grate scene, a variation of Marilyn Monroe's iconic pose in The Seven Year Itch.

=== Critical response ===
On Rotten Tomatoes, the film has an approval rating of 32% based on reviews from 19 critics. On Metacritic the film has a score of 55 out of 100, based on reviews from 10 critics.

Richard Schickel of Time wrote that the film was "one of this summer's more pungent pleasures, a well-made sex farce of classical proportions. If there is a horse to fall off or an airplane forced to land at the wrong airport, you may be sure Teddy will be aboard."

Variety wrote that "the laughs roll along readily as Wilder tries one idea after another to sneak out on wife Judith Ivey and family to rendezvous with Le Brock." Variety also praised Gilda Radner for her performance.

Jeff Stricker of the Minneapolis Star-Tribune said, "there is nothing deep or profound in this movie, but there are no pretensions, either. It is a light, summer-weight sitcom and a loving adaptation of its French predecessor, a pleasing 80 minutes that won't leave you hysterical, but will certainly amuse."

Kathleen Carroll of the New York Daily News had mixed feelings about the film, saying she thought it was "a giddy, reasonably funny farce, but its characters, especially Teddy's three infantile male buddies, are not nearly as well-defined as they were in the original French comedy."

A far more negative review came from Ralph Novak of People, who said, "when it comes to criminal waste of time and talent, it would be hard to top this would-be romantic comedy, which Gene Wilder wrote, directed, and stars in"; he singled out the use of Stevie Wonder's songs ("having access to the ability of Stevie Wonder and trashing it in this way ought to be a capital offense"), and called it "spurious in the extreme" before adding that it "drones on through all the clichés of infidelity to a resolution that isn't emotionally, morally or comedically satisfying."

Gene Siskel of the Chicago Tribune awarded the film only one star, and declared, "the only reason to watch the film is an occasional glimpse of the stunningly beautiful model Kelly Le Brock making her feature-film debut as the femme fatale who turns the head of the married milquetoast character played by Wilder." He dismissed the other central characters as "some kind of sick variation on the classic swinging California married man" and had even less positive things to say about the presentation of Gilda Radner in it:

You may have heard that Wilder's real-life love, Gilda Radner, is also in the picture and therefore you assume that she has a substantial role in it. Forget it. She has a minor, singularly unfunny role as an old maid. Radner is so ugly in this film that we constantly wonder if it's the makeup or whether she is ill. She's 45 years old and severely dehydrated in this picture. Rarely has anyone filmed their own girlfriend in such an unattractive manner.

Nancy Scoll of the San Francisco Examiner also awarded the film a one-star rating and said that it was "a classic example of a self-indulgent actor who should never direct or write [because] the script is embarrassing and the gags are clumsy."

=== Accolades ===
Award	Category	Song Title	Recipient	Result	Ref.
Academy Awards	Best Original Song	"I Just Called to Say I Love You"	Stevie Wonder	Won	
British Academy Film Awards	Best Original Song Written for a Film	"I Just Called to Say I Love You"	Stevie Wonder	Nominated	
Golden Globe Awards	Best Original Song	"I Just Called to Say I Love You"	Stevie Wonder	Won	
Grammy Awards	Song of the Year	"I Just Called to Say I Love You"	Stevie Wonder	Nominated	
Grammy Awards	Best Pop Vocal Performance, Male	"I Just Called to Say I Love You"	Stevie Wonder	Nominated	
Grammy Awards	Best Pop Instrumental Performance	"I Just Called to Say I Love You"	Stevie Wonder	Nominated	
Grammy Awards	Best R&B Vocal Performance, Male	"The Woman in Red"	Stevie Wonder	Nominated	

The film is recognized by American Film Institute in these lists:

- 2004: AFI's 100 Years...100 Songs:
  - "I Just Called to Say I Love You" – Nominated

== Legacy ==
=== Turkish adaptation ===
There is an adaptation film titled "Aşık Oldum" (I Fell in Love), which was made in Turkey in 1985. It has been performed by famous actors in Turkey and is occasionally broadcast on television. The Turkish screenplay is identical to the original, with only a few minor differences. Interestingly, the original film was released in Turkey three years later, in 1988.

== See also ==
- What Happened on Twenty-third Street, New York City
- White dress of Marilyn Monroe
