= Nina Companeez =

French screenwriter

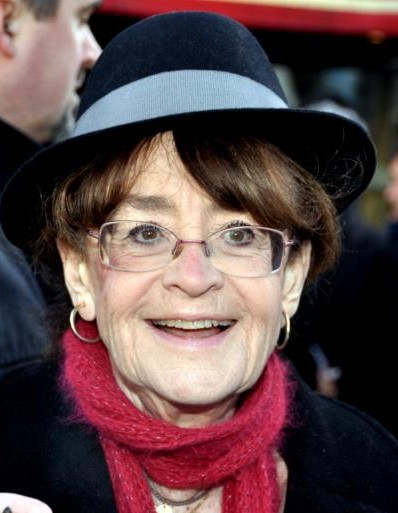
- Companeez in February 2013
- Born: 26 August 1937; Boulogne-Billancourt, France
- Died: 9 April 2015 (aged 77); Paris, France
- Occupations: Screenwriter; Film director
- Years active: 1961–2015

Nina Companeez (26 August 1937 – 9 April 2015) was a French screenwriter and film director. Nina Companeez was the younger daughter of Russian Jewish émigré screenwriter Jacques Companéez and younger sister of contralto Irène Companeez. She was the mother of actress Valentine Varela.

Companeez was a long-time collaborator of Michel Deville. She wrote scripts for 29 films and television shows. In April 2015, she died at the age of 77.

== Selected filmography ==
=== Writer ===
- Tonight or Never (1961)
- Adorable Liar (1962)
- Because, Because of a Woman (1963)
- Girl's Apartment (1963)
- Lucky Jo (1964)
- Martin Soldat (1966)
- The Mona Lisa Has Been Stolen (1966)
- Zärtliche Haie (1967)
- Benjamin (1968)
- Bye bye, Barbara (1969)
- The Bear and the Doll (1970)
- Raphael, or The Debauched One (1971)
- Faustine et le Bel Été (1972)
- L'histoire très bonne et très joyeuse de Colinot trousse-chemise (1973)
- The Horseman on the Roof (1995)
- À la recherche du temps perdu (2011)

=== Actor ===
- Benjamin (1968) - Une invitée (uncredited)
- Bye bye, Barbara (1969) - La directrice de l'agence de call-girls (uncredited)
- The Bear and the Doll (1970) - Dame en blanche (uncredited)
