= Guy Bedos =

French actor (1934–2020)

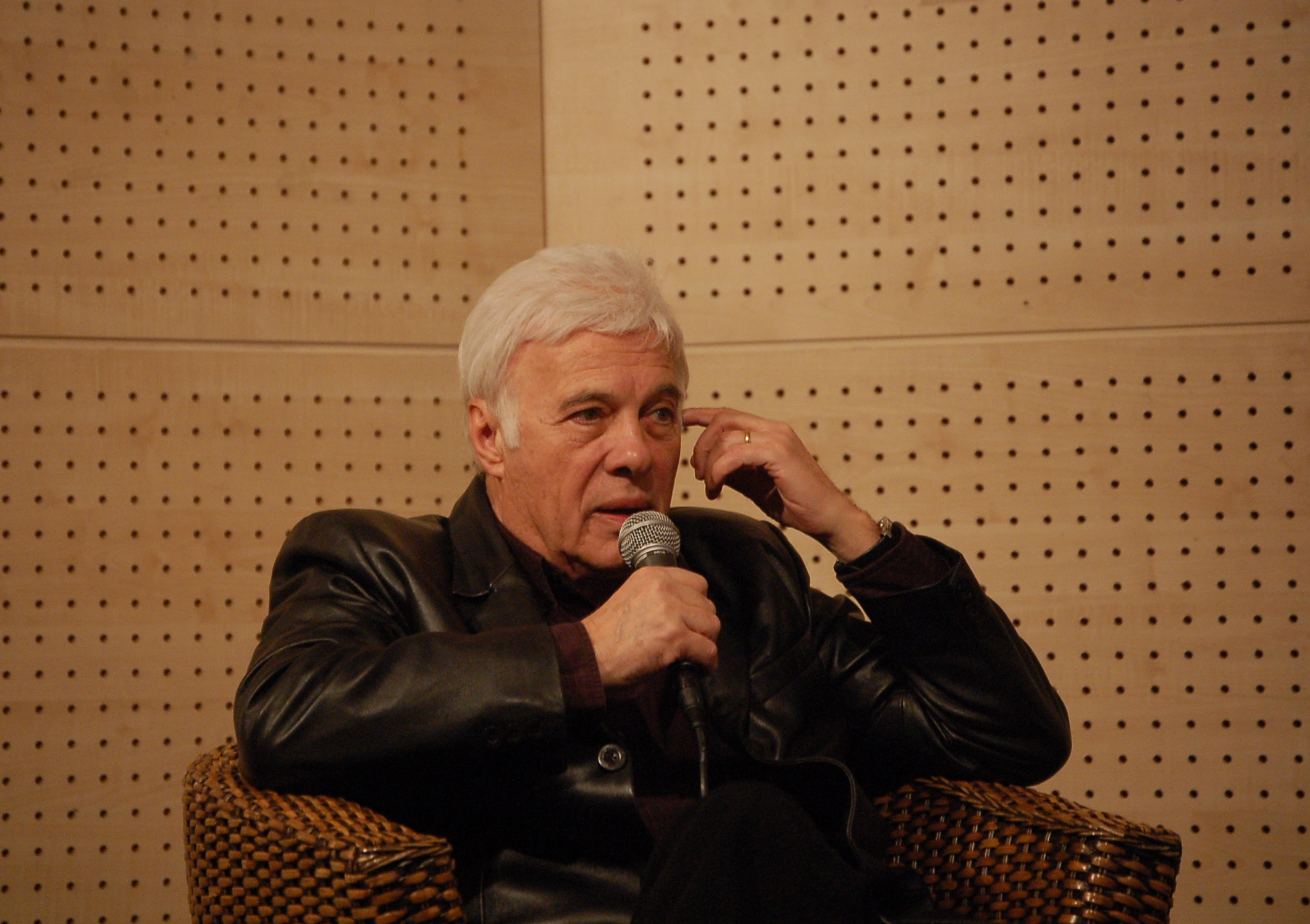
- Bedos in 2009
- Born: Guy René Bédos; 15 June 1934; Algiers, French Algeria
- Died: 28 May 2020 (aged 85); Paris, France
- Occupations: Screenwriter; stand-up comedian; actor
- Spouse: Sophie Daumier (1965–1977)
- Children: Nicolas Bedos; Victoria Bedos

Guy Bedos (French: [ɡi bədos]; né Guy René Bédos [ɡi ʁəne bedos]; 15 June 1934 – 28 May 2020) was a French screenwriter, stand-up comedian and actor (mostly known for his part in the film Nous irons tous au paradis). He was a French man born in Algeria, a former French department. He is identified as a Pied-Noir, name given to the French people by the Algerians in assimilation with the French sailors who were navigating with steam boat. As they were walking barefoot on coal their feet were black. At Music-Hall, he interpreted various sketches of authors like him. He developed a regularly updated political satire. This satire affected mostly right-wing politicians, his "friends" of the left also suffer from his cutting reflections.

He was also known for his left-wing political affiliation, having supported politicians such as François Mitterrand.

== Life and career ==
Bedos was born in Algiers, Algeria, the son of Alfred Bedos, a health visitor, and Hildeberte Verdier, daughter of the headmaster of the high school Bugeaud, where he was raised. His parents separated. He was tossed around, home to hotel, in Kouba, where there was a pension at age seven in Finouche, who served as a teacher, Souk Ahras and Constantine. He enrolled at the age of thirteen with a Catholic high school in Bone. According to his autobiography ‘Memories d’outre-mere’, his bad relationship with his mother and step-father made his life very difficult. His step-father beat his mother, who beat her son. He also tells us that his step-father was racist and antisemitic, but that his mother gave him his human political consciousness. He also revealed that during that period of time he had obsessive compulsive disorders.

His uncle, Jacques Bedos, worked at Radio Algerias before entering the ORTF in Paris, where he vacationed as an artist.

He arrived in Paris in June 1949 with his parents and his two twin half-sisters, left the family home of Rueil-Malmaison in February 1950, and sold books, going door to door. At seventeen, he entered the Rue Blanche school, learned classical theater, and signed his first production: Marivaux Arlequin poli par l’amour. He played in theaters, but also cabarets, as La Fontaine des Quatre-Saisons. He was engaged by François Billetdoux, when Jacques Prévert, who found him writing, encouraged him to write sketches. He performed his first sketch, signed by Jacques Chazot, La Galerie 55.

In 1954, he made his first appearance in the cinema in Futures Vedettes by Marc Allégret.

In order for him to fulfill his military service during the Algerian war, he went on a hunger strike and succeeded in being reformed for mental illness.

Bedos died on 28 May 2020 at age 85; the death was confirmed by his son, Nicolas Bedos.

== Personal life ==
He married 3 times

- With Karen Blanguernon, they had a daughter, Leslie Bedos, born in 1957
- With Sophie Daumier, they had a daughter, Melanie, born in 1977. She previously had a son, Phillipe, born in 1954, who died 11 December 2010 like her from the degenerative Huntington illness.
- With Joelle Bercot, they had 2 children, Nicolas, born in 1980, and Victoria, born in 1984

On 22 December 2011, in an interview published in Libération, a French daily newspaper, he mentioned his deceased family members, including Françoise Dorléac, I had a fiancee, Francoise Dorleac. Since her death, I cannot pass La Louvre without looking at it. Because Francoise died in a car accident, he no longer drove.

== Career ==
In 1965, he started the music hall Bobino co-starring with Barbara, and then began a career as a comedian forming, a duet with Sophie Daumier, whom he married 19 February 1965. After their divorce in 1977, he started his solo career, as an actor in film and television movies.

He is known for his recurring role of Simon in the 1970s, as a doctor suffocated by his very possessive Jewish-foot-black mother, in An Elephant that Deceives Enormously and, We Will All Go to the Paradise of Yves Robert.

Since then, he has directed and performed many shows, including one with Michel Boujenah and Smaïn entitled Coup de soleil at the Olympia, and one in duet with Muriel Robin in 1992.

He has also performed in plays such as La Résistible Ascension by Bertolt Brecht.

He contributed regularly to the satirical weekly, Siné Hebdo created by Siné, until it was not published. He had taken the defense of Siné when he had been accused of anti-Semitism by the director of Charlie Hebdo, Philippe Val.

== Engagements in Politics and the Public ==
Sometimes at differences with his ideas, he felt "closer to Albert Camus rather than Enrico Macias."

Bedos was a "man of the left" without supporting any particular political party. In 2012, he moved in Hénin-Beaumont to support the candidacy of Jean-Luc Mélenchon.

He was often indicated as one of the representatives of the left wing by essayists and personalities of the right, among whom notably are Éric Zemmour or Jean Roucas.

In 2008, he showed his support for Yvan Colonna.

In October 2013 during a show, he portrayed the old Minister of Employment Nadine Morano, setting off many comments in mass media. Brought on by the last action, he was discharged by the court of Nancy.

He also continued to support the activists of the right association in accommodation. He was a member of the League of Human Rights.

He was a member of the Honorary Committee of the Association for the right to die with dignity. He was regularly involved with the association, and in 2012 he co-wrote a call for candidates in the presidential elections to commit to introduce a Bill to legalize euthanasia.

He was part of the committee in support of journalist Denis Robert at Florange on 10 November 2007.

In the citizen primary in 2017, he supported Arnaud Montebourg, stating "I think Manuel Valls is left as I am far-right. There are a lot of things that I have disliked in his behavior when he was Prime Minister and Minister of the Interior." Initially named the head of the committee in support of Montebourg, Bedos started to refuse by presiding over, then accepted it before giving it away again.

He intervened again, unexpectedly according to him, declaring it was "left but not Socialist" and reminded that he was against racism in all forms "but I’m not always okay with how our Muslim friends treat women. I say. I don’t care if someone doesn’t like it."

Bedos had come to support Jean-Luc Mélenchon on 18 March 2017 to market for the Republic life of the rebellious France.

== Labour court judgement and condemnation ==
Bedos was sanctioned in 1995 by the labor court of Tours for having fired a couple he had hired for the maintenance of a rented castle.

== Filmography ==
Year	Title	Role	Notes
1955	School for Love	Rudy	
1956	Ce soir les jupons volent	Paul e cousin éconduit de Blanche	
1956	Short Head	Fred Campuche	Uncredited
1958	Sacrée jeunesse	Mike, le jeune giflé	
1958	Young Sinners		Uncredited
1961	Tonight or Never	Jean-Pierre	
1962	The Elusive Corporal	Le prisonnier qui bégaye	
1962	L'empire de la nuit		
1963	Carambolages		
1963	La Soupe aux poulets	Hardouin	
1963	Sweet and Sour	Gérard	
1964	Aimez-vous les femmes?	Jérôme Fenwick	
1965	Les copains	Martin	
1967	Sept hommes et une garce	Latouche	
1969	Appelez-moi Mathilde	Georges	
1970	Le pistonné	Claude Langmann	
1971	Pouce	Lui	
1972	L'oeuf	Émile Magis	
1975	Le jardin qui bascule	Maurice Garcia	
1976	Pardon Mon Affaire	Simon	
1977	Nous irons tous au paradis	Simon	
1984	Même les mômes ont du vague à l'âme	Edy Valter, le mari d'Eva	
1984	Réveillon chez Bob	Thierry 'T.H.' Hubert	
1986	Sauve-toi, Lola	Tsoukolvsy, le psy	
1987	Il est génial papy!	Sébastien	
1992	Le bal des casse-pieds	Germain	
1996	Un homme est tombé dans la rue		
1997	Sous les pieds des femmes	Le Procureur	
2003	The Car Keys	Himself	
2006	La jungle	Le père de Vincent	
2007	Survivre avec les loups	Jean	
2011	Moi, Michel G., milliardaire, maître du monde	Frank-David Boulanger	
2011	...And If We All Lived Together	Jean Colin	

== See also ==
- Monique Mayère
