= Le grand soir =

Le grand soir may refer to:

- Le Grand Soir (film) a 1976 film directed by Francis Reusser
- Le grand soir (film), a 2012 drama film directed by Benoît Delépine and Gustave de Kervern
- "Le Grand Soir" (song), the Belgian entry in the Eurovision Song Contest 2005, performed by Nuno Resende
