= 6th César Awards =

1981 movie awards ceremony

- Date: 31 January 1981
- Site: Palais des Congrès, Paris, France
- Hosted by: Pierre Tchernia

Highlights
- Best Film: The Last Metro
- Best Actor: Gérard Depardieu
- Best Actress: Catherine Deneuve
- Most awards: The Last Metro (10)
- Most nominations: The Last Metro (12)

Television coverage
- Network: Antenne 2

The 6th César Awards ceremony, presented by the Académie des Arts et Techniques du Cinéma, honoured the best French films of 1980 and took place on 31 January 1981 at the Palais des Congrès in Paris. The ceremony was chaired by Yves Montand and hosted by Pierre Tchernia. The Last Metro won the award for Best Film.

== Winners and nominees ==
The winners are highlighted in bold:

**Best Film** **The Last Metro**: Loulou; My American Uncle; Every Man for Himself	**Best Director** **François Truffaut** – **The Last Metro**: Alain Resnais – My American Uncle; Jean-Luc Godard – Every Man for Himself; Claude Sautet – A Bad Son
**Best Actor** **Gérard Depardieu** – **The Last Metro**: Michel Serrault – La Cage aux Folles II; Philippe Noiret – Pile ou face; Patrick Dewaere – A Bad Son	**Best Actress** **Catherine Deneuve** – **The Last Metro**: Isabelle Huppert – Loulou; Nicole Garcia – My American Uncle; Nathalie Baye – A Week's Vacation
**Best Supporting Actor** **Jacques Dufilho** – **A Bad Son**: Heinz Bennent – The Last Metro; Alain Souchon – Je vous aime; Guy Marchand – Loulou	**Best Supporting Actress** **Nathalie Baye** – **Every Man for Himself**: Delphine Seyrig – I Sent a Letter to My Love; Andréa Ferréol – The Last Metro; Claire Maurier – A Bad Son
**Best Screenplay, Dialogue or Adaptation** **The Last Metro** – **François Truffaut** and **Suzanne Schiffman**: Atlantic City – John Guare, My American Uncle – Jean Gruault; Death Watch – Bertrand Tavernier and David Rayfiel	**Best Cinematography** **Néstor Almendros** – **The Last Metro**: Bernard Zitzermann – The Lady Banker; Sacha Vierny – My American Uncle; Pierre-William Glenn – Death Watch
**Best Music** **Georges Delerue** – **The Last Metro**: Michel Legrand – Atlantic City; Serge Gainsbourg – Je vous aime; Antoine Duhamel – Death Watch	**Best Sound** **Michel Laurent** – **The Last Metro**: Jean-Pierre Ruh – The Lady Banker; Michel Desrois – Death Watch; Pierre Lenoir – A Bad Son
**Best Editing** **Martine Barraqué** – **The Last Metro**: Geneviève Winding – The Lady Banker; Albert Jurgenson – The Umbrella Coup; Michael Ellis and Armand Psenny – Death Watch	**Best Production Design** **Jean-Pierre Kohut-Svelko** – **The Last Metro**: Jean-Jacques Caziot – The Lady Banker; Jacques Saulnier – My American Uncle; Dominique André – A Bad Son
**Best Animated Short Film** **Le Manège**: Le Réveil; The Three Inventors	**Best Fiction Short Film** **Toine**: Le Bruit des jambes de Lucie; La Découverte; Vive la mariée
**Best Documentary Short Film** **Le Miroir de la terre**: Abel Gance, une mémoire de l'avenir; Dorothea Tanning - Insomnia	**Best Foreign Film** **Kagemusha**: Fame; Kramer vs. Kramer; The Rose
**Honorary César** **Marcel Pagnol**; **Alain Resnais**

== See also ==
- 53rd Academy Awards
- 34th British Academy Film Awards
