= André Marcon =

French actor (born 1948)

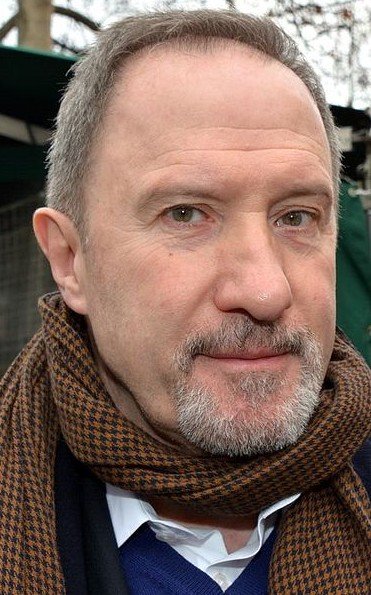
- Marcon in 2016.
- Born: 6 July 1948 (age 77); Saint-Étienne, France
- Occupation: Actor
- Years active: 1977–present

André Marcon (born 6 July 1948) is a French actor. In 1980 he starred in Le Voyage en douce directed by Michel Deville.

== Selected filmography ==
- Le Voyage en douce (1980)
- Stolen Life (1998)
- Peau d'Ange (2002)
- The Page Turner (2006)
- Le Cri (2006)
- 36 Views from the Pic Saint-Loup (2009)
- Au galop (2012)
- On the Other Side of the Tracks (2012)
- Gare du Nord (2013)
- Me, Myself and Mum (2013)
- A Perfect Man (2015)
- Marguerite (2015)
- Things to Come (2016)
- See You Up There (2017)
- Volontaire (2018)
- An Officer and a Spy (2019)
- A Radiant Girl (2021)
- Lost Illusions (2021)
- The Mad Women's Ball (2021)
- Soul Mates (2023)
- Of Money and Blood (2023)
- Maigret and the Dead Lover (2026)
