= Benjamin (1968 film) =

- Film poster
- Directed by: Michel Deville
- Written by: Michel Deville; Nina Companéez
- Produced by: Mag Bodard
- Starring: Michèle Morgan; Catherine Deneuve; Pierre Clémenti; Michel Piccoli
- Cinematography: Ghislain Cloquet
- Edited by: Nina Companeez
- Music by: Jean Wiener
- Production companies: Marianne Productions; Parc Film
- Distributed by: Les Films Paramount
- Release date: 12 January 1968
- Running time: 90 minutes
- Country: France
- Language: French
- Box office: 2,542,714 admissions (France)

Benjamin (original title: Benjamin ou les Mémoires d'un puceau; U.S title: The Diary of an Innocent Boy) is a 1968 French comedy film directed by Michel Deville who co-wrote the screenplay with Nina Companéez.

== Plot ==
In the eighteenth century, seventeen-year-old virgin Benjamin comes with his old servant to stay at the estate of his aunt, Countess de Valandry, who is having an affair with Count Philippe. Benjamin is pursued by various women, including the beautiful Anne, who really loves Philippe.

== Cast ==
- Michèle Morgan as Countess de Valandry
- Catherine Deneuve as Anne
- Pierre Clémenti as Benjamin
- Michel Piccoli as Count Philippe
- Francine Bergé as Marion
- Anna Gaël as Célestine
- Catherine Rouvel as Victorine
- Jacques Dufilho as Camille
- Odile Versois as Married woman

== Production ==
Filming began in June 1967. The day before filming began, Catherine Deneuve's sister and fellow actress Françoise Dorléac had died in a car accident.

"It was a painful time in my life", she later recalled. "I was in a cloud. I turned a bit like a misty automaton. Fortunately, the grief did not mark the film."

"Benjamin was a role that I really liked," said Deneuve later. "It was a comedy, but in the spirit and tone particular."

== Reception ==
=== Box office ===
The film was the eleventh most popular movie at the French box office in 1968.

=== Critical response ===
The critic for The Guardian claimed that "the dialogue is stylish without being witty and it is continuously and tiresomely arch." The Los Angeles Times said the film was "as superlatively acted as it is photographed and scored". The Washington Post said the film "has little to be said for it except is evidently authentic chateux".

Pauline Kael wrote that Pierre Clementi "indicates adolescent innocence by being loose-limbed and girlish. It is essential for the boy to suggest the kind of man he will become once he has learned what everyone is so eager to teach him, but Clémenti looks as though he would become a lesbian."
