= Kiss Me General =

- Directed by: Michel Deville
- Written by: Maurice Rheims; Michel Deville; Nina Companeez
- Produced by: Pierre Braunberger
- Starring: Robert Hirsch
- Cinematography: Claude Lecomte
- Edited by: Nina Companeez
- Music by: Maurice Leroux
- Production company: Les Films de la Pléiade
- Distributed by: CCFC
- Release date: 28 September 1966
- Running time: 91 minutes
- Country: France
- Language: French

Kiss Me General (original title: Martin Soldat) is a 1966 French comedy film directed by Michel Deville and starring Robert Hirsch, Véronique Vendell, Walter Rilla, Marlène Jobert and Anthony Sharp. An actor disguises himself as a soldier during the Second World War, but is mistaken for a soldier and becomes a war hero during the Allied Liberation of France in 1944.

== Cast ==
- Robert Hirsch - Martin
- Véronique Vendell - Zouzou
- Walter Rilla - Général von Haffelrats
- Marlène Jobert - La résistante
- Anthony Sharp - Major
- Reinhard Kolldehoff - Le chef de la Gestapo
- Paul-Emile Deiber - Le général de Lamarzelle
- Adrien Cayla-Legrand - Charles de Gaulle.
