= Jacques Zabor =

French actor and comedian (1941–2007)

- Born: 1941; France
- Died: 2007 (aged 65–66)
- Occupation(s): Actor, comedian

Jacques Zabor (June 28, 1941 – November 22, 2007) was a French actor and comedian. In 1980 he starred in Le Voyage en douce under director Michel Deville.

== Filmography ==
Year	Title	Role	Notes
1966	Ne nous fâchons pas		
1978	Dossier 51	Rossignat	
1980	Le Voyage en douce	Denis / Hélène's husband	
1981	La gueule du loup		
1988	Mon ami le traître	Dubois	
2004	Narco	Le père Pupkin	
2005	Le regard	Albert	
2006	L'entente cordiale		
2007	Cherche fiancé tous frais payés	Le directeur	
