= Françoise Morhange =

French actress

- Born: 21 March 1915; Paris, France
- Died: 12 August 1984 (aged 69); Agadir, Morocco
- Years active: 1936-1985

Françoise Morhange (1915–1984) was a French actress. In 1980, she starred in Le Voyage en douce under director Michel Deville.

== Filmography ==
Year	Title	Role	Notes
1936	Girls of Paris	Jeannette Maubert	
1945	Girl with Grey Eyes	Berthe Renard	
1980	Le Voyage en douce	La grande-mère / The Grandmother	
1982	Boulevard des assassins	Louise Mariani	
1983	Life Is a Bed of Roses		
1983	La Bête noire	La Palmyre	
1984	Mesrine	Mme Lelièvre	
1984	Love Unto Death	Mme Vigne	
