= Jacques Perret (writer) =

French writer (1901–1992)

Jacques Perret (September 8, 1901, Trappes, Yvelines – December 10, 1992, Paris) was a French writer best known for his novel Le Caporal Épinglé (1947), which tells the story of his captivity in Germany and of his escape attempts. This novel would later be adapted into a film by famous French director Jean Renoir in 1962. Perret was nominated for the Academy Award for Best Story for the film The Sheep Has Five Legs (1954).

== Works ==
Chronicles

- 1953 Bâtons dans les roues, Gallimard
- 1954 Cheveux sur la soupe, Gallimard
- 1957 Salades de saison, Gallimard
- 1964 Le vilain temps, Le Fuseau
- 1980 Un marché aux puces, Julliard

Novels

- 1936 Roucou, Gallimard
- 1937 Ernest le rebelle, Gallimard
- 1947 Le caporal épinglé, Gallimard
- 1948 Le vent dans les voiles, Gallimard
- 1951 Bande à part, Gallimard
- 1953 Mutinerie à bord, Amiot-Dumont
- 1961 Les biffins de Gonesse, Gallimard
- 1969 La compagnie des eaux, Gallimard

Short stories

- 1947 l’Oiseau rare, Gallimard
- 1949 Objets perdus, Gallimard
- 1951 la Bête Mahousse, Gallimard
- 1953 Histoires sous le vent, Gallimard
- 1955 Le machin, Gallimard
- 1981 Tirelires, Julliard

Memories

- 1975 Grands chevaux et dadas, Gallimard
- 1976 Raisons de famille, Gallimard
- 1980 Un marché aux puces, Julliard
- 1982 Belle lurette, Julliard
- 1985 Le jardin des Plantes, Julliard

Various

- 1964 Preface to Rabelais's Pantagruel, Gallimard
- 1965 Rapport sur le paquet de gris, Aspects de la France
- 1979 Preface to Alexandre Vialatte's C'est ainsi qu'Allah est grand, Julliard
- 1964 Trois pièces (Maximilien, Monsieur Georges, Caracalla), Editions Gallimard (plays)
- 1989 Les collectionneurs, Le Dilettante
- 1991 Articles de sport, Julliard
- 1992 Comme Baptiste...ou les tranquillisants à travers les âges, Le Dilettante
- 1996 François, Alfred, Gustave et les autres, Le Dilettante
- 2004 L'aventure en bretelles, followed by Un Blanc chez les Rouges, Le Dilettante
- 2005 Chroniques, Arcadia Editions
