= The Mona Lisa Has Been Stolen =

1966 film

- Directed by: Michel Deville
- Written by: Nina Companeez; Michel Deville; Walter Reisch (screenplay 1931)
- Starring: George Chakiris; Marina Vlady
- Edited by: Antonietta Zita
- Release date: 20 May 1966
- Running time: 104 minutes
- Country: France
- Language: French

The Mona Lisa Has Been Stolen (French: On a volé la Joconde) is a 1966 French comedy film directed by Michel Deville.

== Plot ==
Loosely based on German movie The Theft of the Mona Lisa (1931).

In Paris around 1911, a handsome young Italian called Vincent arrives looking for work as a picture framer. He is taken on by Lemercier, whose firm is used by the Louvre museum, and gets to know staff at the Louvre. He also gets to know Nicole, a pretty young chambermaid who lets him take her out but nothing more. At a variety show. she agrees to become the magician's assistant and goes off with him to his next booking. Vincent says he will be in Avignon for a few days if she changes her mind. Next day, when the Louvre is closed for cleaning, he removes the Mona Lisa and sets off with it by automobile for Avignon. He is followed by two crooks seeking to relieve him of the painting, two police detectives on his trail, Nicole who has changed her mind, and the magician seeking to retrieve his assistant. After many battles between the various parties, the police regain the painting and Vincent regains Nicole. who he takes to Italy and enlists as his assistant for future art thefts.

== Cast ==
- George Chakiris as Vincent "Romeo" (named after Vincenzo Peruggia, the real-life thief of the Mona Lisa)
- Marina Vlady as Nicole
- Margaret Lee as Marie-Christine Lemercier
- Paul Frankeur as Lemercier
- Jean Lefebvre as Gardien
- Henri Virlojeux as Le conservateur du Louvre
- Alberto Bonucci as Illusioniste
- Jacques Echantillon as Ernest
- Jess Hahn as Fêtard

== Production ==
The film was one of a number of European films starring George Chakiris.
