= Jacques Pieiller =

French actor

- Born: France
- Occupation: Actor

Jacques Pieiller is a French actor. In 1980, he starred in Le Voyage en douce under director Michel Deville.
