= L'Enfant Secret =

- Film poster
- French: L'enfant secret
- Directed by: Philippe Garrel
- Written by: Philippe Garrel
- Produced by: Philippe Garrel
- Starring: Anne Wiazemsky
- Cinematography: Pascal Laperrousaz
- Edited by: Philippe Garrel
- Music by: Faton Cahen
- Release date: 1979
- Country: France
- Language: French

L'Enfant Secret is a 1979 French film written and directed by Philippe Garrel. It stars Anne Wiazemsky as Elie and Henri de Maublanc as Jean-Baptiste, a filmmaker. The original film score was composed by Faton Cahen who reprised his collaboration with Garrel on Liberté, la nuit (1983), Paris vu par… 20 ans après (1984) and J'entends plus la guitare (1991). It was premiered in Paris in 1979 and received wider release in 1982. In October 2017, it was released in cinemas in the United States. The film won Prix Jean Vigo in 1982.

== Cast ==
- Anne Wiazemsky as Elie
- Henri de Maublanc as Jean-Baptiste
- Xuan Lindenmeyer as Swann, Elie's child
- Cécile Le Bailly as Chloé
- Elli Medeiros as the whore
- Philippe Garrel as the psychiatric patient
- Ari Päffgen as the boy
- Eliane Roy as Jean-Baptiste's mother
- Edwige Belmore as the prostitute
