= Girl's Apartment =

1963 film

- Directed by: Michel Deville
- Written by: Nina Companeez; Michel Deville
- Based on: Girl's Apartment by Jacques Robert
- Produced by: Paul Graetz
- Starring: Mylène Demongeot; Sylva Koscina; Renate Ewert
- Cinematography: Claude Lecomte
- Edited by: Nina Companeez
- Music by: Jean-Jacques Grünenwald
- Production companies: Transcontinental Films; Produzioni Intercontinentali; Consul Filmverleih
- Distributed by: Les Films Sirius; Union Générale Cinématographique
- Release date: 4 December 1963
- Running time: 98 minutes
- Countries: France; Italy; West Germany
- Language: French

Girl's Apartment (French: L'Appartement des filles) is a 1963 comedy film directed by Michel Deville and starring Mylène Demongeot, Sylva Koscina and Renate Ewert. It was a co-production between France, Italy and West Germany.

It was shot at the Epinay Studios in Paris. The film's sets were designed by the art director Henri Schmitt.

== Plot ==
A smuggler befriends an air hostess who believes can help him carry off his latest plan, but also encounters her two female roommates.

== Cast ==
- Mylène Demongeot as Mélanie
- Sylva Koscina as Elena
- Renate Ewert as Lolotte
- Sami Frey as Tibère
- Daniel Ceccaldi as François
- Jean-François Calvé as Christophe

== Bibliography ==
- Oscherwitz, Dayna & Higgins, MaryEllen. The A to Z of French Cinema. Scarecrow Press, 2009.
