= Sweet and Sour (1963 film) =

1963 film

- Directed by: Jacques Baratier
- Written by: Jacques Baratier; Guy Bedos; Eric Ollivier
- Produced by: Pierre Kalfon
- Starring: Guy Bedos; Jean-Pierre Marielle
- Cinematography: Henri Decaë
- Edited by: Néna Baratier
- Music by: Ward Swingle; Jacques Audiberti; Boris Bassiak
- Distributed by: Dicifrance
- Release date: 21 December 1963
- Running time: 93 minutes
- Countries: France; Italy
- Language: French
- Box office: $7.6 million

Sweet and Sour (French: Dragées au poivre) is a 1963 French-Italian comedy film directed by Jacques Baratier and starring Guy Bedos. The film was selected for screening as part of the Cannes Classics section at the 2016 Cannes Film Festival.

== Cast ==
- Jean Babilée as Oscar
- Guy Bedos as Gerard
- Jean-Paul Belmondo as Raymond
- Claude Brasseur as Plumber
- Françoise Brion as Striptease Girl
- Sophie Daumier as Jackie
- Jacques Dufilho as Monsieur Alfonso
- Anna Karina as Ginette
- Jean-Pierre Marielle as Rakanowski
- Andréa Parisy as Striptease Girl
- François Périer as Legrand
- Jean Richard as Lepetit
- Simone Signoret as Genevieve
- Alexandra Stewart as Anna
- Roger Vadim as He
- Romolo Valli as Monsieur X.
- Monica Vitti as She
- Marina Vlady as Callgirl
- Élisabeth Wiener as Frederique
- Georges Wilson as Casimir
- Pascale Roberts as Spogliarella
- Macha Méril as The striptisist
- Tsilla Chelton
