= Lucky Jo =

1964 film

- Film poster
- Directed by: Michel Deville
- Written by: Nina Companeez; Michel Deville
- Produced by: Jacques Roitfeld
- Starring: Eddie Constantine; Pierre Brasseur; Christiane Minazzoli
- Cinematography: Claude Lecomte
- Edited by: Nina Companeez
- Music by: Georges Delerue
- Production company: Les Productions Jacques Roitfeld
- Distributed by: Union Générale Cinématographique; Les Films Sirius
- Release date: 11 November 1964
- Running time: 90 minutes
- Country: France
- Language: French

Lucky Jo is a 1964 French crime film directed by Michel Deville and starring Eddie Constantine, Pierre Brasseur and Christiane Minazzoli.

== Cast ==
- Eddie Constantine as Christopher "Lucky Jo" Jowett
- Pierre Brasseur as Le commissaire Loudéac
- Georges Wilson as Simon Archambaut
- Christiane Minazzoli as Adeline Archambaut
- Jean-Pierre Darras as Napo
- André Cellier as Gabriel Farkas
- Christian Barbier as Le commissaire Odile
- Claude Brasseur as Loudéac Junior
- Françoise Arnoul as Mimi Perrin
- Anouk Ferjac as The woman at the bar

== Bibliography ==
- Parish, Robert. Film Actors Guide. Scarecrow Press, 1977.
