= Zärtliche Haie =

1967 film

- Film poster
- Directed by: Michel Deville
- Written by: Nina Companéez; Gabrielle Upton
- Produced by: Aldo von Pinelli
- Starring: Anna Karina
- Cinematography: Heinz Hölscher
- Music by: Martin Böttcher
- Distributed by: Nora-Filmverleih
- Release date: 10 March 1967
- Running time: 89 minutes
- Countries: Germany; France
- Language: French

Zärtliche Haie (French: Tendres requins) is a 1967 German-French comedy film directed by Michel Deville and starring Anna Karina.

== Cast ==
- Anna Karina as Elena / Costa
- Mario Adorf as Spion SB 3
- Gérard Barray as Gregory
- Fritz Tillmann as Admiral
- Scilla Gabel as Zeezee
- Klaus Dahlen as Alexander
- Rainer von Artenfels as Philander
- Franco Giacobini as Fähnrich
