= My American Uncle =

- Theatrical release poster (artwork: Enki Bilal)
- Directed by: Alain Resnais
- Screenplay by: Jean Gruault
- Based on: Writings by Henri Laborit
- Produced by: Philippe Dussart
- Starring: Gérard Depardieu; Nicole Garcia; Roger Pierre
- Cinematography: Sacha Vierny
- Edited by: Albert Jurgenson
- Music by: Arié Dzierlatka
- Distributed by: Gaumont
- Release date: 21 May 1980
- Running time: 126 minutes
- Country: France
- Language: French
- Box office: $1 million

Mon oncle d'Amérique (English: My American Uncle or My Uncle from America) is a 1980 French film directed by Alain Resnais with a screenplay by Jean Gruault. The film juxtaposes a comedy-drama narrative with the ideas of Henri Laborit, the French surgeon, neurobiologist, philosopher and author. Its principal actors are Gérard Depardieu, Nicole Garcia, and Roger Pierre.

== Synopsis ==
Henri Laborit gives an introduction to the physiology of the brain, and also briefly describes his own background. Summary biographies of three fictional characters are given in parallel to his own: Jean Le Gall is born into a comfortable middle-class family on an island in the gulf of Morbihan in Brittany and pursues a career in radio and politics; Janine Garnier, daughter of left-wing working-class parents in Paris, runs away from home to become an actress, but later switches career to be a fashion adviser; René Ragueneau rebels against the old-fashioned outlook of his farming family in Torfou, in Maine-et-Loire, and studies accountancy before becoming an executive in a textile factory in Lille; a company merger forces him to take a new job in Cholet, away from his wife and children.

Laborit expounds his ideas on four main types of animal behaviour, grounded respectively in consumption, escape, struggle, and inhibition. The lives of the three fictional characters intersect at various points (Jean in an affair with Janine, René negotiating with Janine about the future of his job) and each of them faces moments of critical life-changing decision. At these moments they are seen as self-identifying with the image of a popular star in French cinema (Jean with Danielle Darrieux, Janine with Jean Marais, and René with Jean Gabin).

Laborit comments on the conflicts arising from pursuit of dominance among individuals and defensive reactions to it, and reflects on the need for better understanding of the human brain.

== Cast ==
- Gérard Depardieu as René Ragueneau
- Nicole Garcia as Janine Garnier
- Roger Pierre as Jean Le Gall
- Nelly Borgeaud as Arlette Le Gall
- Pierre Arditi as Zambeaux
- Gérard Darrieu as Léon Veestrate
- Philippe Laudenbach as Michel Aubert
- Marie Dubois as Thérèse Ragueneau
- Geneviève Mnich as René's mother
- Henri Laborit as himself

== Development ==
Resnais first met Laborit when the latter, an admirer of L'Année dernière à Marienbad, asked to work with him on a short documentary film for a pharmaceutical laboratory about a product to enhance the capacity of memory. That film was not financed, but the two men decided to explore the possibility of a feature film in which documentary would be mingled with fiction. Resnais began an extensive programme of immersing himself in Laborit's published works, to understand how the presentation of scientific reasoning might interact with fictional narrative in a dramatically interesting way while treating each type of material independently. Resnais commented on his plan in an interview: "Films or plays usually arise from a desire to develop an idea or theory through characters or through a story. I said to myself, 'Wouldn't it be fun to do just the opposite? To allow theory and fiction to coexist on the screen.'"

The screenwriter Jean Gruault developed the fictional strands, after reading all of Laborit's works himself, and in continual discussions with Resnais. This led to a screenplay in which three fictional characters would take Laborit's theories as their starting point but their interwoven stories would then develop in their own way. The process of writing the screenplay took one year.

Resnais also added the idea of using black-and-white extracts from old films to explore the way in which the characters might be influenced by models of behaviour embodied in certain well-known film actors, just as people sometimes admit to being influenced by books they have read or people they have met. Gruault made the choice of Danielle Darrieux, Jean Marais and Jean Gabin as the most likely ones to fit his three characters.

== Production ==
Filming took place in Paris and on location at Cholet and the Îles Logoden in Morbihan, Brittany. The budget was not sufficient to allow extensive studio filming and so existing locations were used but often completely transformed (e.g. a bank became the broadcasting offices).

The fictional stories were filmed in advance and independently of Laborit's contributions. At this stage Resnais did not know exactly what Laborit was going to say, although he had discussed with him the general themes which he would cover. Some very long shots were filmed in the stories to allow flexibility for Laborit's words to be added later. The editor Albert Jurgenson commented that the role of the editing process in the film was more important than usual, and the various elements were so complex that everything could not be foreseen in the planning; the film was thoroughly rebuilt at the editing stage.

In the film's epilogue a montage of travelling shots shows a landscape of abandoned and half-demolished buildings in the Bronx, New York, culminating on a starkly contrasted mural of a green tree painted on the side of one of the buildings, providing a moment of relief and pleasure. The camera then moves progressively closer to the mural in a series of shots, causing the whole image to disintegrate into its constituent parts until we can see only fragments of paint on the side of a single brick. Resnais explained that he wanted to show an image of the impossibility for the brain to understand things completely; the effort to create something and then an effort to destroy it were tendencies which seemed to fit the atmosphere of the film. The mural was "The American Forest" by the American artist and environmentalist Alan Sonfist.

== Reception ==
When released in France the film achieved 1,378,207 admissions, and Resnais judged it to be one of the most popular films he had made. It was also one of his more successful films in the United States and it had a run of several months in New York.

The reception among press reviewers was mixed. In France critical observations included a view that the disparate elements of the film did not blend together satisfactorily or throw sufficient light upon each other, while there was also some concern expressed that the scientific arguments about the biological determinism of human actions and social phenomena were reactionary ideas which would give support to the politics of the 'new right'.

In English-language reviews there was a similar range of reaction, from warm appreciation of a humorous and witty entertainment to sceptical dissatisfaction with its apparent didacticism and the lack of integration between science and fiction

=== Interpretation ===
One issue which has been repeatedly discussed in assessments of the film is the extent to which the fictional stories are intended to illustrate the scientific account outlined by Laborit and whether Resnais is sharing and endorsing his theories, as some reviews have readily assumed. Some accounts have gone further by representing Laborit's remarks as comments on the behaviour of the three fictional characters in the stories. Elsewhere the view that Resnais and Laborit are expressing the same point of view has been challenged, and the case made that the structure of the film is a more complex arrangement of several component parts, of which Laborit's commentary is one, which need to be examined in relation to each other.

Resnais discussed this question in several interviews after the film's release and consistently made the point that while the film was deeply influenced by Laborit's ideas, it was not a presentation of them, nor a critique. For example: "... I didn't want the characters simply to illustrate [Laborit's ideas]. Nor did I conceive his role was to comment on the characters." "It is a film which is permeated by Laborit, for sure, but it is certainly not a systematic illustration of Laborit..." "I am not a biologist nor a philosopher nor a sociologist ... it would be stupid to say that these theories are mine. All the same, I very much like the definition which Henri Laborit gives of the unconscious ... for him it is all of our habits of thought, all our automatic responses". "We did not at any point seek to make his theories appear ridiculous. We have deep sympathy with Laborit. We did not want to offer a 'digest' of his work, nor to popularise it. He acts on our film as a catalyst."

Resnais further explained that his intention was to open up an enquiry and a dialogue with the spectator: "We produced the film upon a contradiction. We wanted it to be impregnated with the theses but to be independent of them as well. I think of it as a collage, with the fiction and the theses alongside each other; sometimes joining, sometimes diverging, sometimes even contradicting. The spectator is free to say that the characters are doing what Professor Laborit says, or that they are not doing what he says."

"Each spectator should experience the film in their own way, bringing into play their own memories and their own associations. What I want to offer them with Mon oncle d'Amérique are the elements - made as clear as possible - to allow them the freedom to construct the film as they prefer it, and to reconstruct themselves in the light of it. While being entertaining if possible."

Henri Laborit also spoke about the film in similar terms: "In Mon oncle d'Amérique my ideas are not there to explain the behaviour of characters to which they don't directly apply, but they help to decode them." He also commented on his own reaction to the film's presentation of his ideas: "Perhaps it covers in a slightly simplistic way the problems of general pathology - the manner in which inhibitions and anguish lead to distress and illnesses - but I quite understand that it's not dealing with a course of lectures! What I really like is the playful side of the film. At every moment you come up against something comic. And also cosmic."

== Accolades ==
The film won the Grand Prix and the FIPRESCI prizes at the 1980 Cannes Film Festival.

Jean Gruault's screenplay was nominated at the 53rd Academy Awards for Best Original Screenplay.

At the French César awards in 1981 the film received six nominations, including Best Film and Best Director, but lost to François Truffaut's The Last Metro in both categories.
