= Pardon Mon Affaire =

1976 film by Yves Robert

- Theatrical release poster
- French: Un éléphant ça trompe énormément
- Directed by: Yves Robert
- Screenplay by: Jean-Loup Dabadie; Yves Robert
- Dialogue by: Jean-Loup Dabadie
- Produced by: Alain Poiré; Yves Robert
- Starring: Jean Rochefort; Claude Brasseur; Guy Bedos; Victor Lanoux; Danièle Delorme; Anny Duperey
- Cinematography: René Mathelin
- Edited by: Gérard Pollicand
- Music by: Vladimir Cosma
- Production companies: Gaumont International; La Guéville
- Distributed by: Gaumont Distribution
- Release date: 22 September 1976
- Running time: 105 minutes
- Country: France
- Language: French

Pardon Mon Affaire (French: Un éléphant ça trompe énormément, lit. 'An Elephant Can Be Extremely Deceptive') is a 1976 French romantic comedy film co-written and directed by Yves Robert. It stars Jean Rochefort, Claude Brasseur, Guy Bedos, Victor Lanoux, Danièle Delorme and Anny Duperey.

The original title contains a pun in French. The word "trompe" means both "the (elephant's) trunk" and "to cheat" (in the sexual/romantic sense). The film follows a married man's desire to have an affair with a model he just met.

The film was followed by the sequel Pardon Mon Affaire, Too! in 1977. An American remake, The Woman in Red, was released in 1984, directed by and starring Gene Wilder.

== Plot ==
In Paris, four men in their 40s meet regularly to play tennis and socialise: Étienne Dorsay, a senior civil servant, is married to Marthe, with whom he has two teenage daughters; Simon, a hypochondriac doctor, lives with his overbearing Jewish mother; Bouly is a serial womaniser whose wife keeps leaving him; and Daniel, a car salesman, has a secret relationship with another man while having an affair with a much younger man. Marthe, who has resumed her studies to obtain her university diploma, constantly rejects the unwanted advances of 17-year-old Lucien, a close friend of one of her daughters.

In the car park of his office building one morning, Étienne sees a beautiful young woman walk over a grating when, like Marilyn Monroe, a blast of air blows her red dress over her head. He becomes instantly attracted to her and sets out to pursue her, despite his loyalty to Marthe. A photographic model named Charlotte, she is amused at his attentions and does not discourage him too ferociously. She invites him to meet her in London, where she is on an assignment. Étienne lies to Marthe that he has to leave on a business trip, but his plane is diverted to Brussels due to fog.

Back in Paris, Daniel drives Étienne and Charlotte to the apartment of Étienne's godmother, to whom he is devoted. There, they find Étienne's family, including his wife and daughters, who have all gathered to throw a surprise birthday party for him. Daniel covers for Étienne by pretending that Charlotte is his girlfriend and takes her home. Later that night, as Étienne leaves with his family, his friends devise a scheme to take him to meet Charlotte at her apartment, where the two ultimately consummate their mutual attraction.

The next morning, Charlotte's husband calls to inform her that he is downstairs, having returned expectedly from a trip. She hurriedly instructs Étienne, who is wearing a dressing gown, to wait on the ledge outside her eighth-floor apartment window, assuring him that her husband will not stay long. However, the couple closes the window as they have sex, leaving Étienne trapped on the ledge overlooking the Champs-Élysées.

Étienne attracts the attention of a crowd of onlookers, who assume that he is suicidal. The fire brigade soon arrives and deploys a life net while a television crew films the rescue, which is watched by his friends, as well as his wife and daughters. In the street below, Charlotte waves goodbye to Étienne as she leaves with her husband. Étienne searches for possible conquests among the crowd and, after noticing an attractive blonde reporter, proceeds to jump as he remarks that he is "only at the beginning of [his] ascent".

== Cast ==
- Jean Rochefort as Étienne Dorsay
- Claude Brasseur as Daniel
- Guy Bedos as Simon Messina
- Victor Lanoux as Bouly
- Danièle Delorme as Marthe Dorsay
- Anny Duperey as Charlotte
- Marthe Villalonga as Mouchy Messina, Simon's mother
- Louise Conte as Étienne's godmother
- Maurice Bénichou as Gonthier
- Christophe Bourseiller (credited as Christophe Bruce) as Lucien
- Martine Sarcey as Esperanza
- Catherine Verlor as Stéphanie Dorsay, Étienne's eldest daughter
- Pascale Reynaud as Delphine Dorsay, Étienne's youngest daughter
- Anne-Marie Blot as Marie-Ange, Bouly's wife
- Anémone as the concierge

== Background ==
Claude Askolovitch wrote that in France, Claude Brasseur is the first "positive" homosexual character in French cinema, to the point that a San Francisco association wanted to congratulate him. His agent initially advised him not to accept the role, but he insisted, setting a condition: "I said straight away that I didn't want to make Daniel a twisted madwoman!". He also asked to play a fight scene in the film. During the scene where his sexuality is revealed, his lover calls him a "poor idiot" in front of his stunned friends. Brasseur explains: "At that moment, I look at my friends to challenge them. There you go: I'm a faggot and I'm pissing you off! But in the next scene, I'm at home. I cry because I think I'm going to lose my friends who won't understand. Rochefort arrives. He doesn't see me crying. I am filmed from behind, out of pride."

== Reception ==
In its first seven weeks in France it grossed 14.7 million French francs ($2.9 million). Tom Allen wrote in SoHo Weekly News that "it is one of those rare, enormously popular hits at home that crosses the ocean without diminishing a laugh; it is both a compendium of recent French comedies as well as somewhat of an homage to Billy Wilder in his Seven Year Itch period, which insures a Franco-American linkage; it is easily one of the funniest romantic farces of the '70s." The British Film Institute said it is a "peculiarly Gallic version of the Seven Year Itch comedy genre; a quicksilver amalgam of American screwball comedy and a dash of French boudoir hi-jinks, the comedy is as light and as fluffy as an expertly made souffle."

Author Daniel Curran wrote that Yves Robert "successfully creates a number of believable characters with honest emotions and places them in lightly humorous situations, and the result falls somewhere between broad comedy and heartfelt drama, as if Robert was attempting a farcical French version of John Cassavetes' Husbands.

In their review, In These Times said the film "is not a significant comment on bourgeois mores; it is easy to take because it is kept consistently light. Robert respects his audience's intelligence, sparing us the tedious soul-searching and introspective on-screen sermonizing that frequently mars comedies on this theme; actions speak louder than words, and Robert's characters actions speak very well, allowing the viewers to figure things out for themselves."

Christopher Porterfield wrote in Time Magazine that the movie "is one of those sex farces that the French seem to be able to whip up like croissants — airy, pleasant and a little flaky; because it is something of a standard product, it is also rather predictable." He also noted that Robert "juggles several subplots that are sometimes amusing but do nothing for the film's cohesiveness."

== Accolades ==
Award	Year	Category	Recipient(s)	Result	Ref(s)
César Awards	1977	Best Supporting Actor	Claude Brasseur	Won	
César Awards	1977	Best Supporting Actress	Anny Duperey	Nominated	
César Awards	1977	Best Screenplay, Dialogue or Adaptation	Jean-Loup Dabadie	Nominated	
Golden Globe Awards	1978	Best Foreign Language Film	Pardon Mon Affaire	Nominated	

== See also ==
- Cinema of France
- List of French actors
- List of French directors
- List of French-language films
- French comedy films
- List of highest-grossing films in France
