= Because, Because of a Woman =

1963 film

- Directed by: Michel Deville
- Written by: Nina Companeez; Michel Deville
- Starring: Jacques Charrier
- Release date: 7 April 1963
- Running time: 116 minutes
- Country: France
- Language: French

Because, Because of a Woman (French: À cause, à cause d'une femme) is a 1963 French comedy film directed by Michel Deville.

== Cast ==
- Jacques Charrier as Remy Fertet
- Mylène Demongeot as Lisette
- Juliette Mayniel as Chloé
- Marie Laforêt as Agathe
- Jill Haworth as Cécilia
- Odile Versois as Nathalie
- Helmut Griem as Johann Muller
- Roland Dubillard as Haudoin (as Grégoire)
- Louis Velle as Bertier
