= The Elusive Corporal =

1962 film directed by Jean Renoir

- Film poster
- Directed by: Jean Renoir
- Written by: Guy Lefranc; Jacques Perret; Jean Renoir
- Produced by: Adry De Carbuccia; Roland Girard; Georges Glass
- Starring: Jean-Pierre Cassel; Claude Brasseur
- Cinematography: Georges Leclerc
- Edited by: Renée Lichtig
- Music by: Joseph Kosma
- Production company: Les Films du Cyclope
- Distributed by: Pathé Consortium Cinéma
- Release date: 23 May 1962
- Running time: 105 minutes
- Country: France
- Language: French
- Box office: $16.9 million

The Elusive Corporal (French: Le Caporal épinglé) is a 1962 French film directed by Jean Renoir that stars Jean-Pierre Cassel, Claude Brasseur, and Claude Rich. It was entered into the 12th Berlin International Film Festival.

Renoir shot his film in Austria in 1961 from Jacques Perret's book based on his own prisoner of war experiences. Renoir's friend and assistant director Guy Lefranc had also been a World War II prisoner of war and had developed the project for seven years. The story serves as a companion piece to the director's 1937 film, Grand Illusion, once more bringing together men from across the broad social spectrum of French society to depict one man's Sisyphean efforts to escape captivity in a German POW camp.

== Plot ==
Among over a million French prisoners of war taken to work in camps in Germany in 1940 is the Corporal, a young man of good background who, finding the oppressiveness of Nazi Germany and the misery of prison life unbearable, makes repeated efforts to escape. Escapes from a logging camp, a brick factory, and a dairy farm all result in recapture, followed by weeks in a punishment camp. Taken into town for dental treatment, he wins the affection of the dentist's teenage daughter, Erika.

His last foray, with two companions, uses the trick of measuring the roadway through the camp gates and then disappearing once in open country. Ringing at the dentist's door, Erika lets them in and, when asked for civilian clothes, she kits them out. Taking a train. they are identified as foreigners by a passenger and the military police are called. At that moment the train runs into an Allied bombing raid, upon which everybody jumps out. Escaping cross country, they encounter a farmer who proves to be another French escapee: he gives them food and describes a safe route to the frontier. The Corporal and his remaining companion part on a bridge in Paris, free men among friends in the country they love.

== Cast ==
- Jean-Pierre Cassel as Le caporal / The Corporal
- Claude Brasseur as 'Papa' / 'Pop'
- O. E. Hasse as Le voyageur ivre dans le train
- Claude Rich as Ballochet
- Jacques Jouanneau as Penche-à-gauche
- Sacha Briquet as L'évadé grimé en vielle femme
- Raymond Jourdan as Hippolyte Dupieu
- Guy Bedos as Le prisonnier qui bégaye
- Philippe Castelli as Le prisonnier électricien
- Gérard Darrieu as L'homme qui louche / The cross-eyed man
- Cornelia Froboess as Erika Schmidt (as Conny Froboess)

== Production ==
Guy Lefranc was assistant director on the film. The film's sets were designed by the art director Wolf Witzemann. Location shooting took place around Paris and Vienna.
