= Love unto Death =

Love Unto Death
- DVD cover
- Directed by: Alain Resnais
- Written by: Jean Gruault
- Produced by: Philippe Dussart
- Starring: Sabine Azéma; Fanny Ardant; Pierre Arditi; André Dussollier
- Cinematography: Sacha Vierny
- Edited by: Jean-Pierre Besnard; Albert Jurgenson
- Music by: Hans Werner Henze
- Distributed by: Acteurs Auteurs Associés
- Release date: 5 September 1984
- Running time: 92 minutes
- Country: France
- Language: French

Love unto Death (original title: L'Amour à mort) is a 1984 French drama film directed by Alain Resnais.

== Plot ==
Elisabeth, a scientist, lives with Simon, an archaeologist. One night, Simon suffers a seizure and is declared dead by a doctor. After a grieving Elisabeth screams for him not to be dead, Simon unexpectedly comes back to life. Elisabeth and Simon discuss the experience with their friends, protestant pastors Judith and Jérôme. Simon seems at first to have resumed a normal life, but being "dead" for a short moment has left him tormented and bitter. He reveals to Elisabeth that he saw many people in the afterlife and expresses a desire to go back there, as he now feels out of place in the world. Elisabeth, who doubts that Simon actually died and does not believe in the afterlife, pleads for him to remain with her. Simon eventually has another seizure and dies for good. Elisabeth comes to believe that it is now her destiny to join him wherever he is. She discusses the philosophical implications with Jérôme and Judith. Jérôme tries to talk her out of it, and even raises the possibility that the afterlife may not exist; Judith supports Elisabeth's decision, which she compares to Jesus marching to Jerusalem. As Elisabeth leaves, Judith consoles Jérôme.

== Production ==
The film was shot in Uzès, Gard, in the south of France.

== Cast ==
- Sabine Azéma - Elisabeth Sutter
- Fanny Ardant - Judith Martignac
- Pierre Arditi - Simon Roche
- André Dussollier - Jérôme Martignac
- Jean Dasté - Dr. Rozier
- Geneviève Mnich - Anne Jourdet
- Jean-Claude Weibel - Le spécialiste
- Louis Castel - Michel Garenne
- Françoise Rigal - Juliette Dotax
- Françoise Morhange - Mme Vigne
- Jean Champion - (voice)
- Yvette Etiévant - (voice)
- Bernard Malaterre - (voice)
