= Heroes Shed No Tears (1986 film) =

1984 Hong Kong film by John Woo

- Theatrical release poster
- Directed by: John Woo
- Screenplay by: John Woo
- Produced by: Chua Lam; Peter Chan; Raymond Chow; John Woo
- Starring: Eddy Ko; Lam Ching-ying; Bruce Jang Il-Sik; Ma Ying-chun; Philippe Loffredo; Cécile Le Bailly
- Cinematography: Kenichi Nakagawa; Leung Hey-Ming
- Edited by: Peter Cheung Yiu-Chung; Hyeon Dong-Choon
- Music by: Tang Siu-Lam; Chung Shiu-Fung
- Production company: Golden Harvest
- Release dates: November 30, 1984 (South Korea); September 5, 1986 (Hong Kong)
- Running time: 94 minutes
- Country: Hong Kong
- Language: Cantonese
- Box office: HK$2.8 million

Heroes Shed No Tears (Chinese: 英雄無淚; Cantonese Yale: Ying Huhng Mouh Leuih; also known as Return to Killing Fields in the Philippines) is a 1984 Hong Kong action war film directed by John Woo. The film stars Eddy Ko, with a supporting cast of Lam Ching-ying, Bruce Jang Il-Sik, Ma Ying-chun, Philippe Loffredo, and Cécile Le Bailly. Filmed prior to the success of Woo's A Better Tomorrow, the film is a story about a group of mercenaries on a mission to extract a drug lord from the Indochina area.

== Plot ==
The Thai government hires a group of Chinese mercenaries led by Chan Chung to capture a powerful drug lord from the Golden Triangle Area near the Vietnamese border with Laos. The mercenaries manage to capture the drug lord, but his men are trying to set him free. Along the way the heroes cross into Vietnam and must face a sadistic Vietnamese colonel as well as protect the family of Chan Chung which lives in a village near the border.

== Cast ==
- Eddy Ko as Chan Chung
- Lam Ching-ying as Vietnamese colonel
- Bruce Jang Il-Sik as General Samton
- Ma Ying-chun as Kenny
- Philippe Loffredo as Louis
- Cécile Le Bailly as a French girl
- Lee Hoi-suk as Julie
- Chin Yuet-sang as Chin

== Production ==
After finishing Plain Jane to the Rescue director John Woo began working on a film titled The Sunset Warrior. Woo was not happy working for the production company Golden Harvest, noting that he "I just wanted to make any movie for them to finish the contract." Woo found the script to be fairly simple and made changes to it to make it more emotional.

The film was shot in Thailand in Salad Buri, for 2 months in 1983, the film featured cast and crew who did not speak English. This included three Korean actors, two French actors (Phillippe Loffredo and Cécile Le Bailly) and two Japanese cameramen and director of photography. The film included scenes of sexuality and drug use which were not shot by Woo.

== Release ==
After the film's completion, it was shelved. Woo commented that the film was all over the place in tone with sometimes being very emotional, something being as violent as a horror film and that it did not contain any popular actors. As of 2004, Woo stated he had not seen the film in its finished form.

After the popularity of Woo's film A Better Tomorrow, the film was released for one week in Hong Kong under the new title Heroes Shed No Tears. The film was released in Hong Kong on September 5, 1986. It grossed a total of 2.8 million Hong Kong Dollars. In the Philippines, the film was released by Pioneer Releasing as Return to Killing Fields on January 28, 1988, connecting it to the unrelated biographical drama film The Killing Fields despite the latter being set in Cambodia.

== Reception ==
From retrospective reviews, Heroes Shed No Tears received a four out of ten rating from John Charles in his book The Hong Kong Filmography, 1977-1997. The review noted that the film had "virtually no plot" and "few sympathetic characters" and that it "displays none of the finesse that would characterise Woo's later work" In his book Ten Thousand Bullets, Christopher Heard stated that the film was "nowhere near as slick as [Woo]'s later movies, but it does have a dark visual harshness that indicates Woo knew the direction in which he wanted to travel."

== See also ==
- List of Hong Kong films
