= Bye bye, Barbara =

1969 film

- Directed by: Michel Deville
- Written by: Nina Companeez; Michel Deville
- Starring: Ewa Swann
- Release date: 26 March 1969
- Running time: 100 minutes
- Country: France
- Language: French

Bye bye, Barbara is a 1969 French comedy film directed by Michel Deville. and written by Nina Companeez and Michel deville. The film stars Ewa Swann and Philippe Avron.

== Cast ==
- Ewa Swann as Paula
- Philippe Avron as Jerôme Thomas
- Bruno Cremer as Hugo Michelli
- Alexandra Stewart as Eve Michelli
- Michel Duchaussoy as Dimitri
- Jacques Destoop as Eterlou
- Anny Duperey as Aglaé
- Yves Brainville as Le commissaire
- Jean Eskenazi as Ménélasse
