= A Simple Story (1978 film) =

- Film poster
- Directed by: Claude Sautet
- Written by: Jean-Loup Dabadie; Claude Sautet
- Produced by: Claude Berri; Pierre Grunstein; Horst Wendlandt
- Starring: Romy Schneider
- Cinematography: Jean Boffety
- Edited by: Jacqueline Thiédot
- Music by: Philippe Sarde
- Production companies: Renn Productions; Sara Films; FR3 Films; Rialto Film; Société Française de Production
- Distributed by: AMLF
- Release date: 22 November 1978
- Running time: 107 minutes
- Countries: France; West Germany
- Languages: French; English

A Simple Story (French: Une histoire simple) is a 1978 French drama film directed by Claude Sautet. It was nominated for the Academy Award for Best Foreign Language Film at the 52nd Academy Awards. For her role as Marie, Romy Schneider won the 1979 César Award for Best Actress.

== Plot ==
The 39-year-old fashion designer, Marie, has a 16-year-old son named Martin from her first and only marriage, with whom she maintains an open and trusting relationship. She has emotionally distanced herself from her partner, Serge, who has ventured into the fashion industry independently. After careful consideration and without his knowledge, she decides to have an abortion for the child she is expecting from him, and simultaneously to separate from him and live alone. Her mother disapproves of this decision; among her four closest friends, who are all also colleagues, only one vehemently defends the marital bond.

Jérôme, the husband of one of these friends, attempts suicide because he faces dismissal, but is saved by the resolute intervention of Marie and his wife, Gabrielle. To help him, Marie arranges to meet with her ex-husband Georges, who is involved in the streamlining associated with the merger of several fashion companies in a prominent position. Returning late at night from the meeting, she is awaited by Serge, who sees his suspicions confirmed that she has left him for someone else. Drunk and jealous, he even becomes violent. After calming down, he confesses to her that he had become obsessed with work because he believed it was the only way he could measure up to her.

Georges, now aware that Marie is living alone, accepts her offer to arrange another rendezvous. They spend a night of love during which they also work through unresolved issues from their marriage. From then on, they meet more often, without wanting to question his current relationship with the much younger Laurence.

When Jérôme's fresh start fails and his second suicide attempt succeeds, Marie and Gabrielle become even closer and decide to move in together – knowing that Marie is pregnant again, this time by Georges. During a preliminary final meeting with him, Marie feels her belief confirmed that she apparently "cannot have a man and a child at the same time," as Georges informs her that he will leave the company and Paris – with his girlfriend, who would "drop everything" for him. So Marie keeps her pregnancy a secret from him. In response to one of the friends' accusations that the growing child would then have "only her," Gabrielle confidently replies: "Her and me."

== Cast ==
- Romy Schneider as Marie
- Bruno Cremer as Georges
- Claude Brasseur as Serge
- Roger Pigaut as Jérôme
- Arlette Bonnard as Gabrielle
- Francine Bergé as Francine
- Sophie Daumier as Esther
- Éva Darlan as Anna
- Nadine Alari as La gynécologue

== See also ==
- List of submissions to the 52nd Academy Awards for Best Foreign Language Film
- List of French submissions for the Academy Award for Best Foreign Language Film
