= Jacqueline Parent =

French actress

Jacqueline Parent is a French actress. In 1980 she starred in Le Voyage en douce directed by Michel Deville.

== Selected filmography ==
- The Big Night (1976)
- The Police War (1979)
- Le Voyage en douce (1980)
- Malevil (1981)
