= Raphael, or The Debauched One =

1971 film directed by Michel Deville

- Film poster
- Directed by: Michel Deville
- Written by: Nina Companéez
- Produced by: Mag Bodard
- Starring: Maurice Ronet
- Cinematography: Claude Lecomte
- Edited by: Nina Companéez
- Distributed by: Columbia Films
- Release date: 2 April 1971
- Running time: 100 minutes
- Country: France
- Language: French
- Box office: $7.6 million

Raphael, or The Debauched One (French: Raphaël ou le Débauché) is a 1971 French historical drama film directed by Michel Deville. It was entered into the 1971 Cannes Film Festival.

== Cast ==
- Maurice Ronet – Raphaël de Lorris
- Françoise Fabian – Aurore
- Jean Vilar – Horace
- Brigitte Fossey – Bernardine
- Isabelle De Funès – Émilie
- Jean-François Poron – Giorgio
- Anne Wiazemsky – Diane
- Yves Lefebvre – Paul
- Hélène Arié – Francesca
- André Oumansky – Feyrac
- Maxime Fabert – Le comte / Count
- Maurice Barrier – Lasalle
- Jean-Pierre Bernard – Norville
- Georges Claisse – Alfred
- Jacques Weber

== Production ==
Principal photography took place from 5 October to 15 December 1970, with filming locations including Rouen and Senlis (Oise).
