= The Big Night (1976 film) =

- Le Grand Soir
- Directed by: Francis Reusser
- Written by: Jacques Baynac
- Starring: Jacqueline Parent; Niels Arestrup
- Cinematography: Renato Berta
- Edited by: Lise Paccaud
- Production companies: Cadiat, C.E.C.R.T., Artco Film
- Release date: 1976
- Running time: 95 minutes
- Country: Switzerland
- Language: French

The Big Night (French: Le Grand Soir) is a 1976 Swiss drama film directed by Francis Reusser and written by Jacques Baynac. Starring Jacqueline Parent and Niels Arestrup, it follows a young night watchman who becomes involved with a group of Leninists. The film won at the Locarno Film Festival.

== Synopsis ==
Léon, a young man from a comfortable background who rejects consumer society, works as a night watchman and encounters a group of Leninists. He falls for Léa, the girlfriend of the group's leader, but his support for the would-be revolutionaries soon attracts police attention.

== Cast ==
The cast includes:

- Jacqueline Parent as Léa
- Niels Arestrup as Léon
- Arnold Walter as Raoul
- François Berthet as René
- Marina Bucher as Marina
- Jacques Roman as Félix
- Roland Sassi as first policeman
- Claude Para as second policeman

== Production ==
The film was digitised in 2018 by the Cinémathèque suisse in cooperation with Renato Berta and Francis Reusser.

== Reception ==
=== Awards ===
It won the Golden Leopard at the 1976 Locarno Film Festival. It also received a quality award from the Swiss Federal Department of Home Affairs.

=== Critical response ===
A 1976 review by film critic Martin Schaub, reproduced by Filmpodium, described the film as a complex work combining a love story, a discussion of political method, and a critique of political rhetoric. Filmdienst described the film as an ironic and distanced attempt to assess the situation and mindset of young leftists after 1968, while also casting light on Western Switzerland between urbanisation and retreat into nature. Le Temps wrote that it offered a nuanced portrait of the political mood of its time.

== Festival screenings ==
The film was screened at the Locarno Film Festival in August 1976. Later festival screenings included the Entrevues – Festival international du film de Belfort in 1995, the 72nd Locarno Film Festival in 2019, and a restored screening at Francophonie 2021 in Limassol.
