= Claude Brasseur =

French actor (1936–2020)

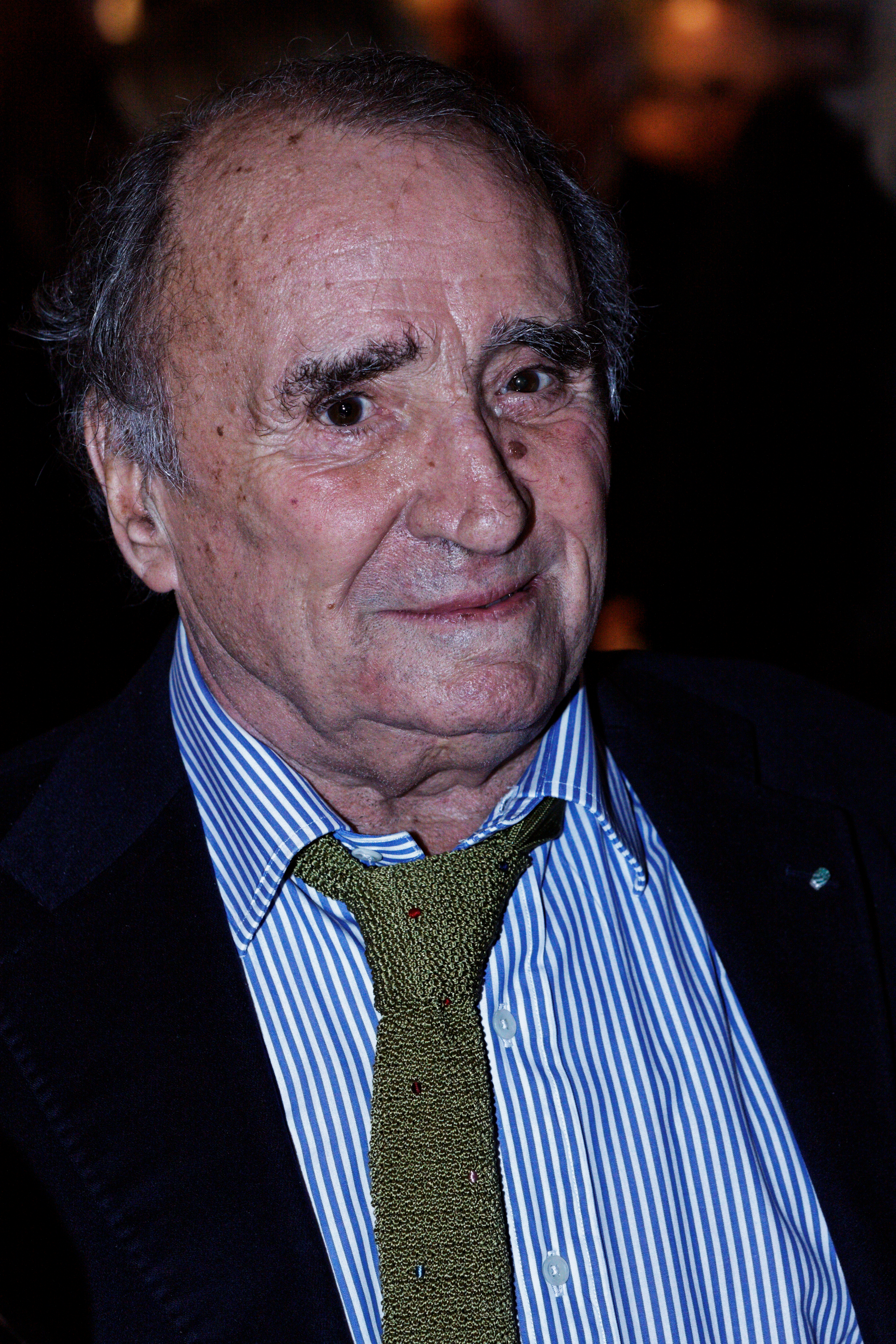
- Brasseur in 2013
- Born: Claude Pierre Espinasse; 15 June 1936; Neuilly-sur-Seine, France
- Died: 22 December 2020 (aged 84); Paris, France
- Occupation: Actor
- Years active: 1956–2018
- Notable work: Bande à part Such a Gorgeous Kid Like Me; The Police War; La Boum
- Spouse(s): Peggy Roche (1961－?, divorced) Michèle Cambon (m. 1970)
- Children: Alexandre Brasseur
- Parent(s): Pierre Brasseur; Odette Joyeux
- Awards: Chevalier (Knight) of the Légion d'honneur (2008)

Claude Brasseur (French pronunciation: [klod bʁasœʁ]; 15 June 1936 – 22 December 2020) was a French actor.

== Life and career ==
Claude Brasseur was born in Neuilly-sur-Seine as Claude Pierre Espinasse, the son of actor Pierre Brasseur and actress Odette Joyeux. He was the godson of Ernest Hemingway and the father of Alexandre Brasseur.

He was a member of the French bobsleigh team in the 1960s and a winning Paris-Dakar rally competitor as co-pilot of Jacky Ickx.

From the late 1950s until two years before his death, Brasseur appeared in overall 150 film and television productions. One of his film roles was as Arthur in Jean-Luc Godard's Bande à part (1964). Brasseur played the title role in the early 1970s historical crime television series The New Adventures of Vidocq. A big commercial success were the comedies La Boum (1980) and La Boum 2 (1982), in which he played the father of Sophie Marceau's teenage character.

Brasseur died on 22 December 2020 at the age of 84. He is buried alongside his father at Pere Lachaise Cemetery in Paris.

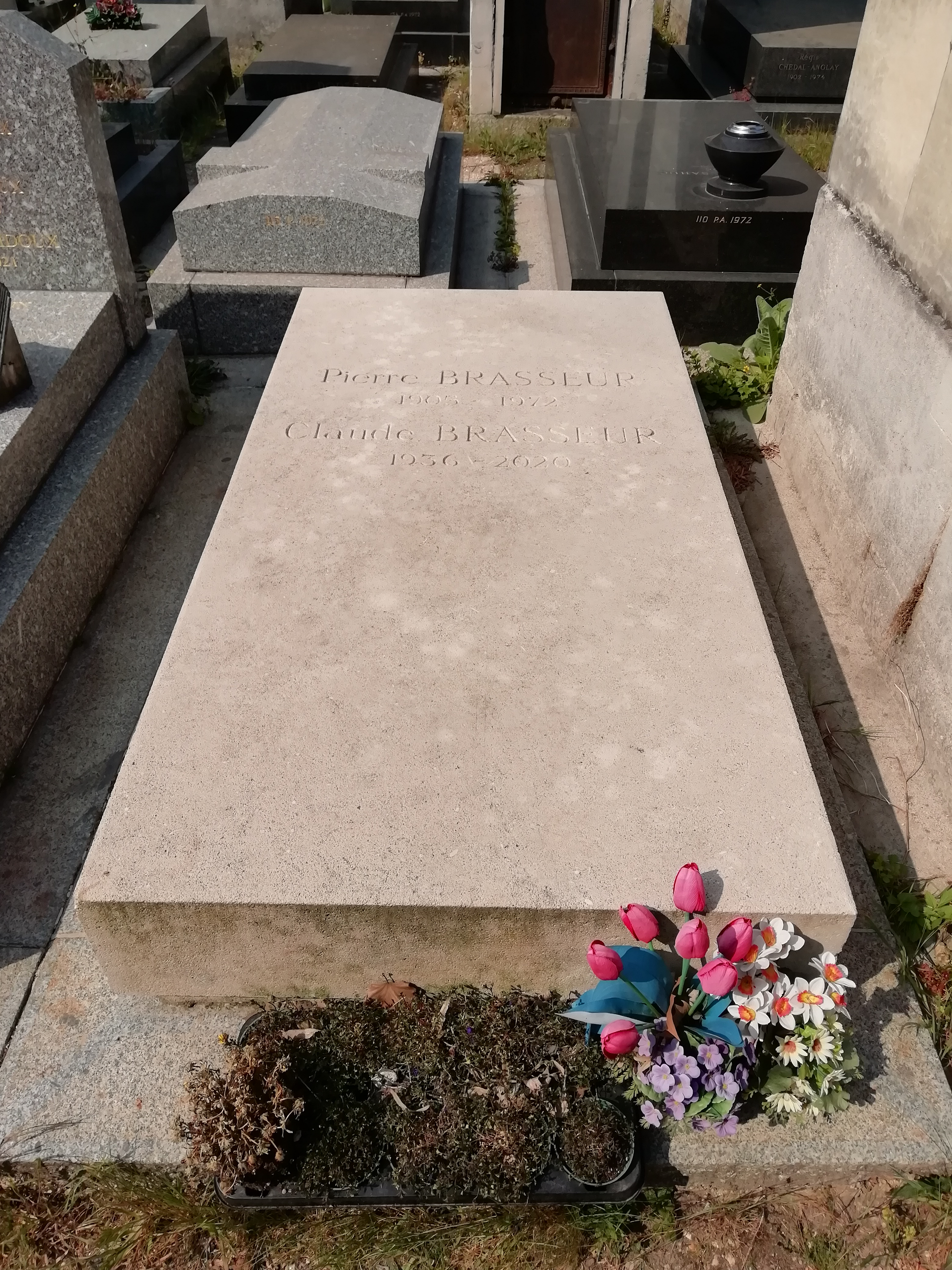
Brasseur’s grave at Pere Lachaise Cemetery

== Accolades ==
Year	Award	Category	Film	Result
1977	César Awards	Best Supporting Actor	Pardon Mon Affaire	Won
1979	César Awards	Best Actor	A Simple Story	Nominated
1979	César Awards	Best Supporting Actor	A Simple Story	Nominated
1980	César Awards	Best Actor	The Police War	Won
1993	César Awards	Best Actor	The Supper	Nominated
1993	Amiens International Film Festival	Best Actor	O Fio do Horizonte	Won
2000	Molière Award	Best Actor	Taking Sides	Nominated
2008	Legion of Honour	Knight	Career	Won
2015	Molière Award	Best Actor	La Colère du Tigre	Nominated
2015	Globe de Cristal Awards	Best Actor	La Colère du Tigre	Nominated

== Selected filmography ==
Year	Title	Role	Director
1956	Meeting in Paris	The young man	Georges Lampin
1959	Rue des prairies	Louis Neveux	Denys de La Patellière
1959	Green Harvest	Robert Borelli	François Villiers
1960	Eyes Without a Face	An Inspector	Georges Franju
1960	Trapped by Fear	Laurent Porte	Jacques Dupont
1961	Please, Not Now!	Claude	Roger Vadim
1962	The Seven Deadly Sins	Riri	Édouard Molinaro
1962	The Elusive Corporal	Papa / Pop	Jean Renoir
1962	Moonlight in Maubeuge	Walter	Jean Chérasse
1962	We Will Go to Deauville	Maurice Dubois	Francis Rigaud
1963	Germinal	Martin Chaval	Yves Allégret
1963	Banana Peel	Charlie Meyer	Marcel Ophuls
1963	Sweet and Sour	The plumber	Jacques Baratier
1964	Bande à part	Arthur	Jean-Luc Godard
1964	Lucky Jo	Loudéac Junior	Michel Deville
1966	The Upper Hand	Giulio	Denys de La Patellière
1967	Shock Troops	Groubec	Costa-Gavras
1970	Too Small Ticky	Inspector Hess	Eddy Matalon
1972	Le Viager	Noël Galipeau	Pierre Tchernia
1972	Such a Gorgeous Kid Like Me	Maître Murene	François Truffaut
1973	The Heroes	Raphael Tilbaudet	Duccio Tessari
1974	Icy Breasts	François Rollin	Georges Lautner
1975	Act of Aggression	André Ducatel	Gérard Pirès
1976	Le guêpier	Renaud	Roger Pigaut
1976	Barocco	Jules	André Téchiné
1976	Pardon Mon Affaire	Daniel	Yves Robert
1976	The Big Operator	Ari	Claude Pinoteau
1977	Monsieur Papa	Franck Lanier	Philippe Monnier
1977	Pardon Mon Affaire, Too!	Daniel	Yves Robert
1978	The Savage State	Gravenoire	Francis Girod
1978	L'argent des autres	Claude Chevalier d'Aven	Christian de Chalonge
1978	A Simple Story	Serge	Claude Sautet
1979	Lobster for Breakfast	Mario Spinosi	Giorgio Capitani
1979	Bye, See You Monday	Arnold Samson	Maurice Dugowson
1979	The Police War	Inspector Jacques Fush	Robin Davis
1980	The Lady Banker	Largué	Francis Girod
1980	La Boum	François Beretton	Claude Pinoteau
1981	Quando la coppia scoppia	Pier Giorgio Funari	Steno
1982	La Boum 2	François Beretton	Claude Pinoteau
1983	Signes extérieurs de richesse	Jean-Jacques Lestrade	Jacques Monnet
1984	Souvenirs, Souvenirs	Firmani	Ariel Zeitoun
1985	Détective	Émile Chenal	Jean-Luc Godard
1985	Among Wolves	Lacier	José Giovanni
1986	Descente aux enfers	Alan Kolber	Francis Girod
1990	Dancing Machine	Inspector Michel Eparvier	Gilles Béhat
1992	The Supper	Joseph Fouché	Édouard Molinaro
1993	1, 2, 3, Sun	The bad guy	Bertrand Blier
1998	Marriages	Alessio	Cristina Comencini
2000	Actors	Himself	Bertrand Blier
2001	The Milk of Human Kindness	Jean-Claude	Dominique Cabrera
2003	Chouchou	Father Léon	Merzak Allouache
2004	Malabar Princess	Robert	Gilles Legrand
2006	Avenue Montaigne	Jacques Grumberg	Danièle Thompson
2006	Camping	Jacky Pic	Fabien Onteniente
2006	Les Petites vacances	The stranger in the palace	Olivier Peyon
2007	His Majesty Minor	Firos	Jean-Jacques Annaud
2010	Camping 2	Jacky Pic	Fabien Onteniente
2015	The Student and Mister Henri	Henri Voizot	Ivan Calbérac
2016	Camping 3	Jacky Pic	Fabien Onteniente
2018	Rolling to You	Jocelyn's father	Franck Dubosc
