= Cécile Le Bailly =

French actress

Cécile Le Bailly is a French actress. In 1975, she starred in Eugénie de Franval, directed by Louis Skorecki.

== Selected filmography ==
- Eugénie de Franval (1975)
- L'enfant secret (1979)
- Martin et Léa (1979)
- Le Voyage en douce (1980)
- Heroes Shed No Tears (1986)
