= The Bear and the Doll =

1970 film by Michel Deville

- Theatrical release poster
- French: L'Ours et la Poupée
- Directed by: Michel Deville
- Screenplay by: Nina Companeez; Michel Deville
- Dialogue by: Nina Companeez
- Produced by: Mag Bodard
- Starring: Brigitte Bardot; Jean-Pierre Cassel
- Cinematography: Claude Lecompte
- Edited by: Nina Companeez
- Music by: Eddie Vartan
- Production companies: Parc Film; Marianne Productions
- Distributed by: Paramount Pictures
- Release date: 4 February 1970 (France)
- Running time: 90 minutes
- Country: France
- Language: French
- Box office: 1,617,853 admissions (France)

The Bear and the Doll (French: L'Ours et la Poupée) is a 1970 French romantic comedy film directed by Michel Deville, starring Brigitte Bardot and Jean-Pierre Cassel. Taking place over 24 hours, a rich, beautiful and wilful woman from Paris is determined to seduce a peaceable musician in the country who appears uninterested in her considerable charms.

== Plot ==
Félicia, a high-spirited society woman, one morning in the country crashes a borrowed Rolls Royce car into the 2CV of Gaspard, a placid cellist who is bringing up his young son and three nieces. Back in Paris, she realises that she has not filled in the compulsory accident report form and spends much of the day trying to locate a cellist with a 2CV. When at last she does, she asks him to the party she is holding in her town mansion to celebrate her latest divorce. As he does not want to stay, full of drink and bravado she drives him erratically through the rain back to his house, where he tries to sober her up and, since she is soaked, puts her in a hot bath . . . . . .

== Cast ==
- Brigitte Bardot as Félicia
- Jean-Pierre Cassel as Gaspard
- Daniel Ceccaldi as Ivan
- Georges Claisse as Stephane
- Patrick Gilles as Titus
- Julien Verdier as Tabard
- Claude Beauthéac as Millot
- Jean Lescot as Bernard
- Olivier Stroh as Arthur
- Patricia Darmon as Mariette
- Sabine Haudepin as Julie
- Valérie Stroh as Charlotte
- Claude Jetter as hippie girl

== Production ==
The film was inspired by American screwball comedies of the 1930s and was written with Catherine Deneuve in mind. Alain Delon and Jean Paul Belmondo were offered the male lead but turned it down. Filming took place in the summer of 1969.

== Reception ==
Vincent Canby of The New York Times wrote that "the maneuverings are mostly the tactics of coy moviemaking here involving several awful child actors, windshield wipers that comment on the action, a huge but gentle dog, a Siamese cat named Prudhomme, and endless little rages between the lovers that define their real affection... Charm is the ingredient that is in singularly short supply in The Bear and the Doll, largely, I suspect, because Miss Bardot, once a sex kitten, now approaches middle age with all of the grace of a seasoned predator."
