= A Gorgeous Girl Like Me =

1972 French film by François Truffaut

- Theatrical release poster
- Directed by: François Truffaut
- Screenplay by: Jean-Loup Dabadie; François Truffaut
- Based on: Such a Gorgeous Kid Like Me by Henry Farrell
- Produced by: Marcel Berbert
- Starring: Bernadette Lafont
- Cinematography: Pierre-William Glenn
- Edited by: Yann Dedet
- Music by: Georges Delerue
- Production company: Les Films du Carrosse
- Distributed by: Warner-Columbia Film
- Release date: 12 September 1972
- Running time: 100 minutes
- Country: France
- Language: French
- Box office: 684,919 admissions (France)

A Gorgeous Girl Like Me (French: Une belle fille comme moi), also known as A Gorgeous Bird Like Me, is a 1972 French film directed by François Truffaut, starring Bernadette Lafont. It is based on Henry Farrell's 1967 novel of the same name.

Truffaut called it "a sarcastic comedy thriller."

== Plot ==
Stanislas Previne is a young sociologist preparing a thesis on criminal women. He meets Camille Bliss in prison to interview her. Camille is accused of having murdered her lover Arthur and her father. She tells Stanislas about her life and her love affairs.

Stanislas, much to the frustration of his secretary, who also has a crush on him, soon falls in love with Camille and works to find the evidence to prove her innocence. His secretary tries to convince the sociologist that Camille is a "manipulative slut" but he cannot be convinced. Through investigation, the sociologist and his secretary find a young boy, an amateur filmmaker, who has captured the evidence they need on film to secure Camille's release from prison.

Once free, Camille, who always has loved music and has seduced the cabaret singer Sam Golden earlier in the film, becomes a cause célèbre and a singing star. Stanislas meets her after a performance, and she seduces him at her home; however, her husband (who is cuckolded many times during the film) discovers them and beats him up. Camille kills her husband and then plants the gun on her passed-out paramour.

When Stanislas is imprisoned for murder, Camille will do nothing to help the man who once freed her. As he cleans up the prison yard, in the film's final segment, the camera pans to show Stanislas's secretary typing a manuscript on a nearby balcony, presumably the thesis that Stanislas began, but this time preparing one that will expose Camille as the manipulative seductress that Stanislas discovered her to truly be.

== Cast ==
- Bernadette Lafont as Camille Bliss
- André Dussollier as Stanislas Prévine
- Claude Brasseur as Maître Murene
- Charles Denner as Arthur
- Guy Marchand as Roger aka Sam Golden
- Anne Kreis as Hélène
- Philippe Léotard as Clovis Bliss
- Gilberte Géniat as Isobel Bliss
- Michel Delahaye as Marchal
- Danièle Girard as Florence Golden
- Martine Ferrière as prison secretary
- Jacob Weizbluth as Alphonse, the mute
- Jean-François Stévenin as the newspapers seller (uncredited)
- François Truffaut as a journalist (voice, uncredited)

== Reception ==
Stanley Kauffmann of The New Republic wrote 'Truffaut makes his absolutely stupidest film to date'.
