= Frédéric Andréi =

French actor and film director

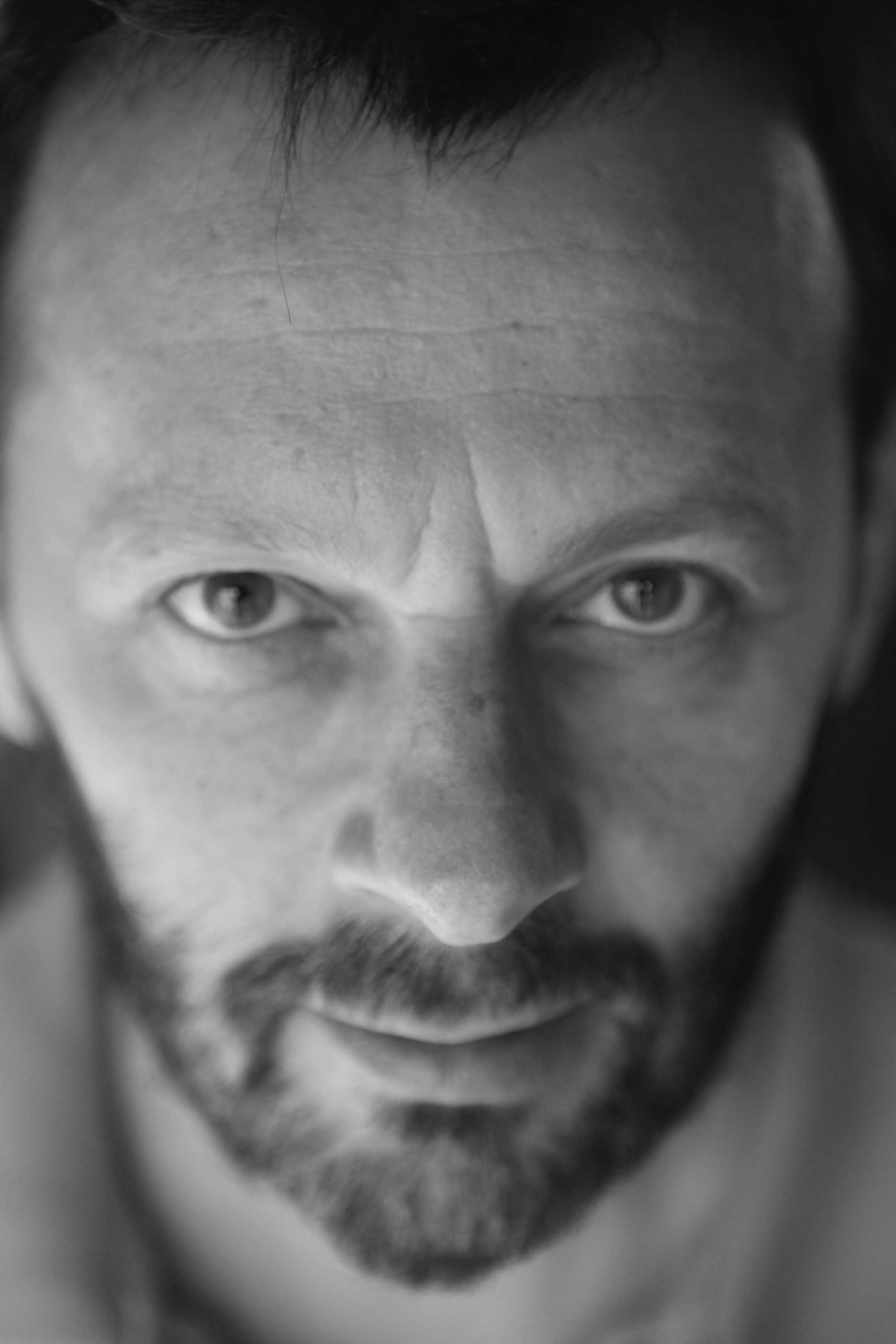
- Frédéric Andréi
- Born: 23 October 1959 (age 65); France

Frédéric Andréi (born 23 October 1959) is a French actor and director.

In 1980 he starred in Le Voyage en douce under director Michel Deville. The next year he played the lead in Jean-Jacques Beineix's Diva, as Jules, a moped-riding postman obsessed with an American opera singer.

He directed the feature films Paris Minuit (1986) and Par suite d'un arrêt de travail (2008).
