= Le Voyage en douce =

1980 film

- Promotional poster
- Directed by: Michel Deville
- Written by: Michel Deville
- Produced by: Maurice Bernart
- Starring: Dominique Sanda; Geraldine Chaplin
- Cinematography: Claude Lecomte
- Edited by: Raymonde Guyot
- Music by: Catherine Ardouin
- Distributed by: Gaumont Distribution
- Release date: 4 January 1980
- Running time: 98 minutes
- Country: France
- Language: French

Le Voyage en douce (English: The Quiet Journey) is a 1980 French drama film written and directed by Michel Deville. The screenplay is shaped around 15 different sexual anecdotes, penned by 15 writers. The film stars Dominique Sanda and Geraldine Chaplin. It was entered into the 30th Berlin International Film Festival.

== Plot ==
Disillusioned with the men in their lives, two friends, Hélène and Lucie, take a break to explore possible summer homes in the South of France. As the pair spend time together, they share sexual memories and fantasies and even enact some. Despite the pleasure of temporary freedom and companionship, they have to return to reality and its unresolved problems.

== Cast ==
- Dominique Sanda as Hélène
- Geraldine Chaplin as Lucie
- Jacques Zabor as Denis
- Jean Crubelier as L'homme des maisons
- Valerie Masterson as La cantatrice
- Cécile Le Bailly as Marie
- Jacqueline Parent as Mathilde
- Jacques Pieiller as Pinson
- Liliane Rovère as The Voice
- Françoise Morhange as La grand-mère
- Frédéric Andréi as Le jeune homme de l'hôtel
- Christophe Malavoy as L'homme du train
- André Marcon as L'homme du concert

== Reception ==
Janet Maslin of The New York Times praised the ambiguous nature of Hélène and Lucie's relationship; "its teasing is effective, thanks particularly to Miss Sanda, who is as beautiful and insolently alluring here as she has ever been. With timing that is constantly surprising, with a knowing sensuality just this side of brazeness, Miss Sanda is enough reason to see the movie. And she and Miss Chaplin share an abandon that is intricately balanced, and gracefully played." Maslin felt that the film was "finally aimless" but that it was still "seductive all the same."

Critic Rob Schmeider wrote that the film "has the distinction of succeeding brilliantly as pornography; like most pornography it must suffer the fate of being born into a man's world; but it is still head and tails above most films with ostensibly lesbian characters." The French weekly L'Express said it is a "masterpiece of eroticism" and Le Monde stated it is "enchanting and tender."

Nancy Scott from The San Francisco Examiner observed that the "fifteen collaborators each contributed an anecdote and these are on the whole, more interesting than the plot proper, which has the look of an ad hoc construction built to house the smaller stories; the movie wanders from one idea of feminine friendship to another and some are true, some contrived, and some just silly; the plot proper would probably collapse entirely if it were not for the performances by Chaplin and Sanda."

== Filming locations ==
The film was partly shot in Paris and in front of the Château de Versailles, and in the south of France, in the Var region, in several villages such as Lorgues, Tourtour and Entrecasteaux.

== See also ==
- Cinema of France
- List of French-language films
- List of LGBTQ-related films of 1980
