= Sophie Daumier =

French actress

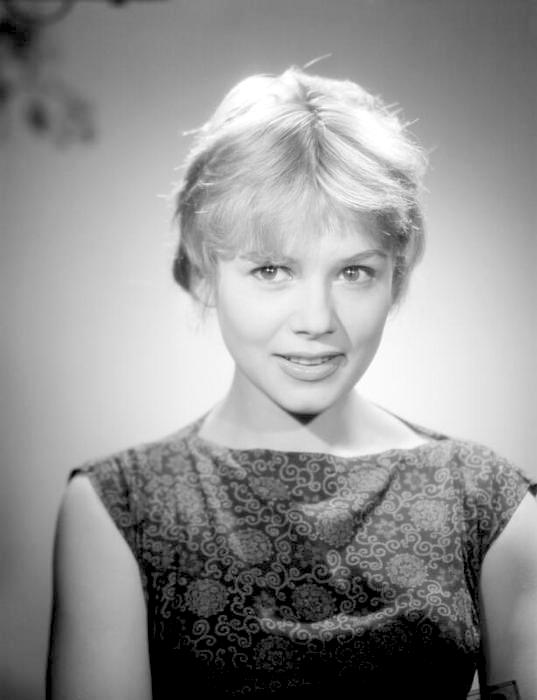
- Born: 24 November 1934; Boulogne-sur-Mer, France
- Died: 31 December 2003 (aged 69); Paris, France
- Occupation: Actress
- Years active: 1956–1979

Sophie Daumier (24 November 1934 – 31 December 2003) was a French film actress. She appeared in 28 films between 1956 and 1979. She was born as Elisabeth Hugon in Boulogne-sur-Mer, Pas-de-Calais, the daughter of composer Georges Hugon. She was married to Guy Bedos from 1965 to 1977; the marriage ended in divorce. She died from Huntington's disease on 31 December 2003 in Paris. She was 69 years old.

== Filmography ==
Year	Title	Role	Notes
1956	Maid in Paris	Une élève	
1957	Les Collégiennes	Nicole	
1957	La peau de l'ours	Juliette Ledrut	
1957	On Foot, on Horse, and on Wheels	Mireille Martin	
1957	Send a Woman When the Devil Fails	Colette Seguin	
1958	Chéri, fais-moi peur	Marion	
1958	Les femmes sont marrantes...	Marie-Josèphe	
1958	A Dog, a Mouse, and a Sputnik	Mireille Martin	
1959	Bal de nuit	Zonzon	
1961	Amelie or The Time to Love	Emmannuelle	
1961	The Crumblers Are Doing Well	Martine Legrand	
1962	Un chien dans un jeu de quilles	Sylvia	
1963	Carom Shots	Solange	
1963	Sweet and Sour	Jackie la p...	
1964	Aimez-vous les femmes?	Violette / Marguerite	
1965	Crime on a Summer Morning	Monique	
1965	Cent briques et des tuiles	Moune	
1965	Una voglia da morire	Marisa	
1965	Love at Sea	L'actrice du bar	
1965	Pas de caviar pour tante Olga	Philo	
1966	For a Few Extra Dollars	Connie Breastfull	
1971	Pouce	Elle	
1977	Violette & François	Paula	
1977	Comme la lune	Nadia	
1978	Freddy	Georgette Roumagnac alias Margot	
1978	A Simple Story	Esther	
1979	Les givrés	L'intellectuelle	(final film role)
