= Jean-Loup Dabadie =

French journalist (1938–2020)

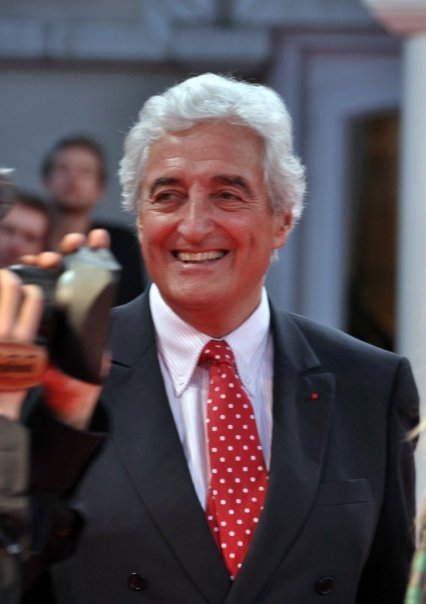
- Dabadie at the 2009 Deauville festival
- Born: 27 September 1938; Paris, France
- Died: 24 May 2020 (aged 81); Paris, France
- Education: Lycée Janson-de-Sailly
- Occupation: Writer
- Known for: Member of the Académie française
- Spouse: Geneviève Dormann (divorced)
- Children: 3

Jean-Loup Dabadie (French pronunciation: [ʒɑ̃ lu dabadi]; 27 September 1938 – 24 May 2020) was a French journalist, writer, lyricist, screenwriter, novelist, author of sketches and songs, playwright, translator, and dialogue writer and member of the Académie Française.

== Filmography ==
- Anna (1967)
- Such a Gorgeous Kid Like Me (1972)
- Parisian Life (1977)
- Courage – Let's Run (1979)
- Clara et les Chics Types (1981)
- Get Well Soon (2014)

== Awards ==
1985 Mystfest for Original Story – La Septième Cible – directed by Claude Pinoteau

Nominated three times for a Cesar Award :

- César 1977: César Award for Best Screenplay, Dialogue or Adaptation for "Un éléphant ça trompe énormément".
- César 1978: Best Screenplay, Dialogue or Adaptation for "Nous irons tous au paradis".
- César 1979: Best Screenplay, Dialogue or Adaptation for "Une histoire simple".
