= Pardon Mon Affaire, Too! =

1977 film by Yves Robert

- Theatrical release poster
- French: Nous irons tous au paradis
- Directed by: Yves Robert
- Screenplay by: Jean-Loup Dabadie; Yves Robert
- Dialogue by: Jean-Loup Dabadie
- Produced by: Alain Poiré; Yves Robert
- Starring: Jean Rochefort; Claude Brasseur; Guy Bedos; Victor Lanoux; Danièle Delorme
- Cinematography: René Mathelin
- Edited by: Pierre Gillette
- Music by: Vladimir Cosma
- Production companies: La Guéville; Gaumont International
- Distributed by: Gaumont Distribution
- Release date: 9 November 1977
- Running time: 110 minutes
- Country: France
- Language: French
- Box office: $13.5 million

Pardon Mon Affaire, Too! (French: Nous irons tous au paradis, lit. 'We Will All Meet in Paradise') is a 1977 French romantic comedy film co-written and directed by Yves Robert. It is a sequel to Pardon Mon Affaire (1976). Jean Rochefort, Claude Brasseur, Guy Bedos, Victor Lanoux and Danièle Delorme reprise their roles from the first film.

== Plot ==
Having fortuitously discovered a photograph in which Marthe embraces someone unknown, clothed with a chequed jacket, Étienne Dorsay becomes jealous, and imagines various stratagems to identify the lover.

In the meantime, Étienne and his friends acquire a weekend house for a very low price.

As in the previous work, the film is largely narrated by the character Étienne, whose tone shifts with the reality of the images.

The film contains a certain number of allusions to the films of Blake Edwards (the Pink Panther series).

== Cast ==
- Jean Rochefort as Étienne Dorsay
- Claude Brasseur as Daniel
- Guy Bedos as Simon
- Victor Lanoux as Bouly
- Danièle Delorme as Marthe Dorsay
- Marthe Villalonga as Mouchy Messina
- Christophe Bourseiller as Lucien
- Josiane Balasko as Josy
- Élisabeth Margoni as Daisy
- Jenny Arasse as Bernadette
- Anne-Marie Blot as Marie-Ange
- Pascale Reynaud as Delphine
- Maïa Simon as Mme Chalamand
- Catherine Verlor as Stéphanie
- Jean-Pierre Castaldi as the bully
- Vania Vilers as Benoît
- Daniel Gélin as Bastien
- Gaby Sylvia as Marie-Christine Bosquet

== Accolades ==
- Nominations for the César Awards, 1978 :
  - "Nomination for the César Award for Best Film : Nous irons tous au paradis
  - "Nomination for the César Award for "décor" : Jean-Pierre Kohut-Svelko, pour Nous irons tous au paradis
  - "Nomination for the César Award for Best Screenplay, Dialogue or Adaptation : Jean-Loup Dabadie, pour Nous irons tous au paradis
