= The Last Metro =

1980 film by François Truffaut

- Film poster
- Directed by: François Truffaut
- Written by: François Truffaut; Suzanne Schiffman; Jean-Claude Grumberg
- Produced by: François Truffaut; Jean-José Richer
- Starring: Catherine Deneuve; Gérard Depardieu; Jean Poiret
- Cinematography: Néstor Almendros
- Edited by: Martine Barraqué
- Music by: Georges Delerue
- Production companies: Les Films du Carrosse; Andrea Films; SEDIF; SFP; TF1 Films Production
- Distributed by: Gaumont Distribution
- Release date: 17 September 1980
- Running time: 131 minutes
- Country: France
- Language: French
- Box office: $23.3 million 3,393,694 admissions (France)

The Last Metro (French: Le Dernier Métro) is a 1980 period drama film, co-written and directed by François Truffaut, that stars Catherine Deneuve and Gérard Depardieu.

Set in Nazi-occupied Paris in 1942, the film follows the fortunes of a small theatre in the Montmartre quarter which keeps up passive resistance by maintaining its cultural integrity, despite censorship, antisemitism and material shortages. The title evokes two salient facts of city life under the Germans: fuel shortages led people to spend their evenings in theatres and other places of entertainment, but the curfew meant they had to catch the last Métro train home.

Upon its release in theatres on 17 September 1980, The Last Metro became one of Truffaut's more commercially successful films. In France it had 3,384,045 admissions and in the United States it grossed $3 million. At the 6th César Awards, The Last Metro received 12 nominations and won 10 of them, including Best Film. The film also received Best Foreign Film nominations at the Academy Awards and the Golden Globes.

== Plot ==
On his way to begin rehearsals at the Théâtre Montmartre, where he has secured the male lead role for an upcoming production, young Bernard Granger finds himself repeatedly rebuffed by a woman he attempts to flirt with on the street. Upon arriving at the theater, he discovers that the woman is actually the production designer, Arlette, who happens to be a lesbian. Bernard is then introduced to Marion, the owner of the theatre and its leading lady. Marion's Jewish husband, Lucas, serves as the theater's director, believed to have fled Paris; however, he is clandestinely hiding in the theater's cellar. Marion secretly releases him each evening, providing meals and materials for future productions. Their evenings are spent in the empty theater, where they engage in passionate discussions about the current production and make plans for Lucas to escape the country. However, Marion soon becomes infatuated with the oblivious Bernard, whom Lucas only knows from a headshot and snippets of conversation overheard through a rigged heating vent.

Unbeknownst to anyone at the theater, Bernard is a member of the Resistance group responsible for delivering the bomb that killed a German admiral.

The opening night of the production sees a full house, but the following morning a scathing review in Je suis partout, an anti-semitic and collaborationist newspaper, condemns the show as being "Jewish." The reviewer, Daxiat, aims to oust Marion and take control of her theater. While the cast and crew celebrate their initial success at a nightclub, Daxiat falsely accuses Bernard of insulting Marion at another gathering. Bernard eventually finds Daxiat and severely beats him in the street. On another occasion, two Gestapo agents, disguised as air raid wardens, conduct a search of the theater, prompting Marion to turn to Bernard in desperation for help in concealing Lucas and his belongings.

Following the arrest of Bernard's Resistance contact during a Gestapo raid, Bernard resolves to devote his life to the Resistance cause and abandon acting. As he prepares to leave his dressing room for the last time, Marion enters to bid him farewell, and the two share a passionate encounter on the floor.

After the war ends, Bernard returns to the theater to star in a new play written by Lucas during his time in hiding. On opening night, Marion, who plays the female lead, expresses her desire to share her life with Bernard, but he confesses that he never truly loved her. As the curtain falls, Bernard, Marion, and Lucas stand hand-in-hand to receive the applause of the audience.

== Cast ==
- Catherine Deneuve as Marion Steiner
- Gérard Depardieu as Bernard Granger
- Jean Poiret as Jean-Loup Cottins
- Heinz Bennent as Lucas Steiner
- Andréa Ferréol as Arlette Guillaume, the production designer
- Paulette Dubost as Germaine Fabre, the older woman employed by the theatre
- Sabine Haudepin as Nadine Marsac, the young actress
- Jean-Louis Richard as Daxiat, a collaborationist theater critic
- Maurice Risch as Raymond Boursier, the technician of the theatre
- Marcel Berbert as Merlin
- Richard Bohringer as a Gestapo Officer
- László Szabó as Lieutenant Bergen
- Jean-Pierre Klein as Christian Leglise, a resistant
- Franck Pasquier as Jacquot/Eric
- Rose Thierry as Jacquot's mother
- Martine Simonet as Martine Sénéchal
- Christian Baltauss as the actor replacing Bernard
- Rénata as Greta Borg, a singer in a club
- Hénia Ziv as Yvonne
- Jean-José Richer as René Bernardini
- Jessica Zucman as Rosette
- René Dupré as M. Valentin
- Alain Tasma as Marc
- Pierre Belot as the Hotel porter
- Jacob Weizbluth as Rosen

== Production ==
Truffaut had wanted to create a film set during the French occupation period for a long time, as his uncle and grandfather were both part of the French Resistance, and were once caught while passing messages. This event was eventually recreated in The Last Metro. Early in his career, Truffaut did not have the opportunity to direct a film about the Nazi occupation; later on, his interest in that period was revived by the 1975 autobiography of actor Jean Marais. Truffaut took inspiration from this book, as well as various documents by theatre people of the time. The scene where Bernard beats up Daxiat was directly based on a real-life beating Marais gave to Alain Laubreaux, the theater critic for Je suis partout.

This film was one installment - dealing with theatre - of a trilogy on the entertainment world envisaged by Truffaut. The installment that dealt with the film world was 1973's La Nuit américaine (Day for Night), which had won the Academy Award for Best Foreign Language Film. Truffaut completed the screenplay for the third installment, L'Agence magique, which would have dealt with the world of music hall. In the late 1970s, he was close to beginning filming, but the failure of his film The Green Room forced him to look to a more commercial project, and he filmed Love on the Run instead.

Truffaut began casting in September 1979, and wrote the role of Marion especially with Catherine Deneuve in mind, for her energy. Gérard Depardieu initially did not want to be involved in the film, as he did not like Truffaut’s directing style, but he was subsequently convinced that he should take part.

Most of the filming took place in an abandoned chocolate factory on Rue du Landy in Clichy, which was converted into a studio. During shooting Deneuve suffered an ankle sprain from a fall, resulting in having to shoot scenes at short notice. Scriptwriter Suzanne Schiffman was also hospitalised with a serious intestinal obstruction. The film shoot lasted fifty-nine days and ended on 21 April 1980.

== Themes ==
A recurring theme in Truffaut’s films has been linking film-making and film-watching. The Last Metro is self-conscious in this respect. In the opening the film mixes documentary footage with period re-creations alongside shots of contemporary film posters.

Truffaut commented: “this film is not concerned merely with anti-semitism but intolerance in general” and a tolerance is shown through the characters of Jean Poiret playing a homosexual director and Andrea Ferreol playing a lesbian designer.

As in Truffaut's earlier films Jules et Jim and Two English Girls, there is a love triangle between the three principal characters: Marion Steiner (Deneuve), her husband Lucas (Heinz Bennent) and Bernard Granger (Depardieu), an actor in the theatre's latest production.

== Reception ==
=== Box office ===
The film recorded admissions in France of 3,384,045.

=== Critical response ===
The Last Metro has an approval rating of 88% on review aggregator website Rotten Tomatoes, based on 24 reviews, and an average rating of 7.4/10.

=== Awards and nominations ===
- Academy Awards (USA)
  - Nominated: Best Foreign Language Film
- National Board of Review (USA)
  - Nominated: Best Foreign Language Film
- Boston Film Critics (USA)
  - Won: Best Foreign Language Film
- César Awards (France)
  - Won: Best Actor – Leading Role (Gérard Depardieu)
  - Won: Best Actress – Leading Role (Catherine Deneuve)
  - Won: Best Cinematography (Néstor Almendros)
  - Won: Best Director (François Truffaut)
  - Won: Best Editing (Martine Barraqué)
  - Won: Best Film
  - Won: Best Music (Georges Delerue)
  - Won: Best Production Design (Jean-Pierre Kohut-Svelko)
  - Won: Best Sound (Michel Laurent)
  - Won: Best Screenplay, Dialogue or Adaptation (Suzanne Schiffman and François Truffaut)
  - Nominated: Best Actor – Supporting Role (Heinz Bennent)
  - Nominated: Best Actress – Supporting Role (Andréa Ferréol)
- David di Donatello Awards (Italy)
  - Won: Best Foreign Actress (Catherine Deneuve)
- Golden Globe Awards (USA)
  - Nominated: Best Foreign Film

== See also ==
- List of submissions to the 53rd Academy Awards for Best Foreign Language Film
- List of French submissions for the Academy Award for Best Foreign Language Film
