= Michel Deville =

French film director and screenwriter (1931–2023)

- Born: 13 April 1931; Boulogne-Billancourt, France
- Died: 16 February 2023 (aged 91); Boulogne-Billancourt, France
- Occupations: Film director; screenwriter
- Years active: 1958–2023

Michel Deville (13 April 1931 – 16 February 2023) was a French film director and screenwriter.

Deville began directing during the emergence of the French New Wave and was a contemporary of filmmakers such as Claude Chabrol, Jean-Luc Godard and François Truffaut, although he was not part of the movement. His early films nevertheless attracted favourable attention from critics at Cahiers du Cinéma, Positif and Présence du cinéma.

One of Deville's comedies, La Lectrice (The Reader) was probably his biggest success with international audiences. La Lectrice is about a woman (played by Miou-Miou), who finds work reading novels for the blind but gradually finds herself unwittingly attracting a clientele of fetishists who enjoyed being read to. At one time his films were difficult to find in North America but presently (2007) seven of his films are available in DVD in the U.S.

His 1980 film Le Voyage en douce was entered into the 30th Berlin International Film Festival. Five years later, his film Death in a French Garden was entered into the 35th Berlin International Film Festival.

A clip from his 1968 film Benjamin is included in Robert Bresson's Une Femme Douce (1969).

Deville died on 16 February 2023, at the age of 91.

== Filmography ==
Year	Title	Credited as		Notes
Year	Title	Director	Screenwriter	Notes
1958	A Bullet in the Gun Barrel	Yes	Yes	
1961	Tonight or Never	Yes	Yes	
1962	Adorable Liar	Yes	Yes	
1963	Because, Because of a Woman	Yes	Yes	Also as producer
1963	Girl's Apartment	Yes	Yes	
1964	Les Petites Demoiselles	Yes	Yes	Telefilm
1964	Lucky Jo	Yes	Yes	
1966	The Mona Lisa Has Been Stolen	Yes	Yes	
1966	Martin Soldat	Yes	Yes	
1967	Zärtliche Haie	Yes		
1968	Benjamin	Yes	Yes	Louis Delluc Prize for Best Film
1969	Bye bye, Barbara	Yes	Yes	
1970	The Bear and the Doll	Yes	Yes	
1971	Raphael, or The Debauched One	Yes		Nominated—1971 Cannes Film Festival - Palme d'Or
1973	The Woman in Blue	Yes		
1974	Love at the Top	Yes		
1977	The Apprentice Heel	Yes	Yes	
1978	Dossier 51	Yes	Yes	César Award for Best Screenplay, Dialogue or Adaptation; French Syndicate of Cinema Critics - Best French Film; Nominated—1978 Cannes Film Festival - Prix Un certain regard Nominated—César Award for Best Film; Nominated—César Award for Best Director
1980	Le Voyage en douce	Yes	Yes	Nominated—30th Berlin International Film Festival - Golden Bear
1981	Eaux profondes	Yes	Yes	
1983	The Little Bunch	Yes		
1984	Les Capricieux	Yes		Telefilm
1985	Death in a French Garden	Yes	Yes	César Award for Best Director; Nominated—35th Berlin International Film Festival - Golden Bear; Nominated—César Award for Best Film; Nominated—César Award for Best Original Screenplay or Adaptation
1986	Paltoquet	Yes	Yes	
1988	The Reader	Yes	Yes	French Syndicate of Cinema Critics - Best French Film; Louis Delluc Prize for Best Film; Montreal World Film Festival - Grand Prix des Amériques; Nominated—César Award for Best Film; Nominated—César Award for Best Director; Nominated—César Award for Best Original Screenplay or Adaptation
1990	Summer Night in Town	Yes		
1991	Lest We Forget	Yes		Segment: "Pour Nguyen Chi Thien, Vietnam"
1992	Toutes peines confondues	Yes		
1994	Aux petits bonheurs	Yes		
1997	La Divine Poursuite	Yes	Yes	
1999	Sachs' Disease	Yes	Yes	Chicago International Film Festival - Gold Hugo; French Syndicate of Cinema Critics - Best French Film; San Sebastián International Film Festival - Silver Shell for Best Director; San Sebastián International Film Festival - Best Screenplay; San Sebastián International Film Festival - Solidarity Award; Nominated—César Award for Best Director; Nominated—César Award for Best Original Screenplay or Adaptation
2002	Almost Peaceful	Yes	Yes	Nominated—59th Venice International Film Festival - Golden Lion
2005	The Art of Breaking Up	Yes		
