= Alex Beaupain =

French singer and composer

Alexandre Beaupain (born 15 October 1974 in Besançon), is a French singer and composer, both of his own songs, and of the music and songs for films, particularly those directed by Christophe Honoré. He has released several albums and received awards, both for film scores and the song albums.

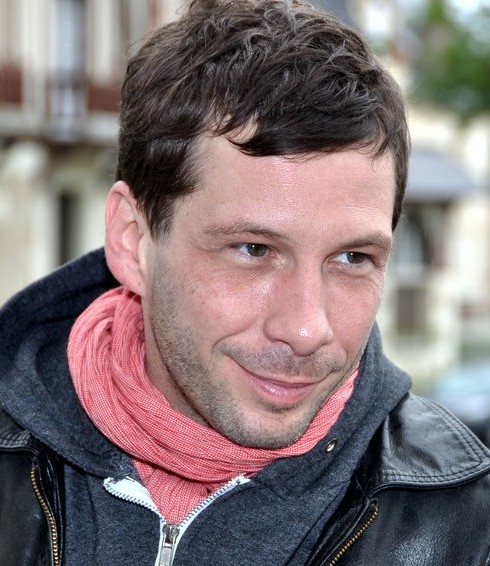
Alex Beaupain at the 2012 Cabourg film festival

== Career ==
Alex Beaupain's mother was a primary school teacher and his father worked for the railways and he has an elder sister and younger brother. As a child, with a home life where culture was important, he learnt the piano and sang in a choir. In 1992 he went to Paris and registered to study Sciences Po. He contributed to several musical shows in the late 1990s by the Compagnie les matelas à ressorts.

His career took off in the late 1990s both in composing songs and the music for films, the latter in particular for the writer and director Christophe Honoré. His first album Garçon d'honneur was released by Naïve Records in 2005, and inspired for Honoré the scenario for Les Chansons d'amour in 2007 in which some of the songs were used.

Beaupain's second album, released in October 2008, was titled 33 Tours, consisting of twelve songs, I want to go home being the first single, the video for which was directed by Christophe Charrier.

In May 2011, the Festival de Cannes closed with a screening of Honoré's Les Bien-Aimés, for which Beaupain had composed the songs. His third album, released in April 2011, was titled Pourquoi battait mon cœur, and was arranged by Jean-Philippe Verdin. The first single was Au départ, which drew parallels between the progress of the left in French politics and the situation of a couple. The album included a duo with Camélia Jordana, Avant la haine, which had featured in the sound track of Dans Paris, Christophe Honoré directing the clip.

Beaupain's fourth album Après moi le déluge was released on 15 April 2013, which preceded a concert tour which included the Olympia Paris and the Casino de Paris.

In 2015, he became involved in the project for a book « Les gens dans l’enveloppe » (People in the envelope) written by Isabelle Monnin based on anonymous photos she had acquired and for which he wrote ten songs on an accompanying CD, interpreted by Camélia Jordana, Clotilde Hesme, Françoise Fabian and himself. The success of the book, both with critics and the public, led to a show based on the project which was mounted at the Philharmonie de Paris in 2017. In 2016, he worked again with Christophe Honoré on the film « Les malheurs de Sophie » adapted from the work of the Comtesse de Ségur. The year also saw his fifth album, « Loin » followed by a concert tour which finished at Bataclan and at the Café de la Danse. Beaupain was a member of the jury for the Festival du cinéma américain de Deauville 2018.

For the theatre he has written the music for two plays produced in Paris, directed by Thierry Klifa, both featuring Fanny Ardant.

In December 2018 he was among 70 celebrities supporting the Urgence Homophobie foundation, appearing in a clip De l'amour. In 2020 a book by Kéthévane Davrichewy was published, centred on Beaupain, through her passion French chanson, entitled Un Chanteur. A television documentary Je n'aime que toi, with a personal view of Beaupain directed by Valentine Duteil and Karine Morales, was broadcast on France 3 in December 2021.

== Discography ==
=== Albums ===
- Garçon d'honneur (2005)
- 33 tours (2008)
- Pourquoi battait mon cœur (2011)
- Après moi le déluge (2013)
- B.O. (2014) – a compilation of songs written for and used in films, sung by Ludivine Sagnier, Louis Garrel, Clotilde Hesme, Grégoire Leprince-Ringuet, Chiara Mastroianni, Catherine Deneuve, Paul Schneider, Vincent Derlerm, Valérie Donzelli, Cyril Descours, and Alex Beaupain himself
- Les Gens dans l'enveloppe, based around the book by Isabelle Monnin (2015)
- Loin (2016)
- Pas plus le jour que la nuit (2019)
- Love on the Beat (2021)

=== Singles ===
- I want to go home (2008)
- Au départ (2011)
- Avant la haine (2011)
- Grands soirs (2013)
- Après moi le déluge (2013)
- Coule (2014)
- Loin (2016)
- Van Gogh (2016)
- Quand on appelle un chat souris (2018)
- Pas plus le jour que la nuit (2019)

== Film and television scores ==
- 2000 : Nous deux directed by Christophe Honoré (short)
- 2002 : 17 fois Cécile Cassard by Christophe Honoré
- 2002 : Tout contre Léo by Christophe Honoré (also appears as actor / singer)
- 2003 : Qui a tué Bambi? by Gilles Marchand (with Lily Margot and Doc Matéo)
- 2006 : Un an by Laurent Boulanger (with Lily Margot and Doc Matéo)
- 2006 : Dans Paris by Christophe Honoré
- 2007 : Les Chansons d'amour by Christophe Honoré (also appears as actor / singer)
- 2008 : La Belle Personne by Christophe Honoré
- 2009 : Non ma fille tu n'iras pas danser by Christophe Honoré
- 2009 : La Belle Vie TV film by Virginie Wagon
- 2011 : Les Bien-aimés by Christophe Honoré
- 2011 : La Règle de trois by Louis Garrel (short)
- 2012 : Marie M. by Christophe Louis (short)
- 2012 : 5, avenue Marceau, title song by Jane Birkin on album ElleSonParis
- 2013 : Boys Band Théorie by Christophe Charrier (short)
- 2014 : Le Cowboy de Normandie by Clémence Madelaine-Perdrillat (short)
- 2016 : Les Malheurs de Sophie by Christophe Honoré
- 2018 : Brillantissime by Michèle Laroque
- 2018 : Jonas by Christophe Charrier
- 2018 : Françoise Fabian, album by Françoise Fabian, production and three songs
- 2020 : Claire Andrieux by Olivier Jahan (TV film)
- 2022 : Le Patient by Christophe Charrier (TV film)
- 2024 : Joli Joli by Diastème (film - 'comédie musicale')

== Awards ==
- 2008 : Étoile d'or de la meilleure musique for Les Chansons d'amour
- 2008 : Grand prix international du disque de l'Académie Charles-Cros for 33 tours
- 2008 : César Award for Best Original Music for Les Chansons d'amour
- 2010 : nomination for César of the best score for Non ma fille, tu n'iras pas danser
- 2012 : nomination for César of the best score for Les Bien-Aimés
- 2012 : Cabourg Film Festival Swann de la meilleure musique for Les Bien-Aimés
- 2013 : Grand prix international du disque de l'Académie Charles-Cros for Après moi le déluge
- 2018 : Festival de la fiction TV de La Rochelle, best music for Jonas
