= Marcello Mio =

2024 film by Christophe Honoré

- Theatrical release poster
- Directed by: Christophe Honoré
- Written by: Christophe Honoré
- Produced by: Philippe Martin
- Starring: Chiara Mastroianni; Catherine Deneuve; Fabrice Luchini; Nicole Garcia; Benjamin Biolay; Melvil Poupaud; Hugh Skinner
- Cinematography: Rémy Chevrin
- Edited by: Chantal Hymans
- Music by: Alex Beaupain
- Production companies: Les Films Pelléas; Bibi Films; Lucky Red; France 2 Cinéma; Super 8 Production; LDRP II; TSF
- Distributed by: Ad Vitam Distribution (France); Lucky Red (Italy)
- Release dates: 21 May 2024 (Cannes); 21 May 2024 (France); 23 May 2024 (Italy)
- Running time: 120 minutes
- Countries: France; Italy
- Languages: French; Italian; English
- Box office: $1.5 million

Marcello Mio is a 2024 comedy film written and directed by Christophe Honoré. In the film, actress Chiara Mastroianni confronts living in the shadow of her real-life father Marcello Mastroianni's legacy. She portrays a version of herself alongside her real-life mother, French actress Catherine Deneuve. Several other actors support the cast and play versions of themselves as well, including Fabrice Luchini, Nicole Garcia, Benjamin Biolay and Melvil Poupaud.

The film had its world premiere in the main competition at the 77th Cannes Film Festival on 21 May 2024, being theatrically released in France on the same day by Ad Vitam Distribution.

== Plot ==
Chiara is an actress and the daughter of Marcello Mastroianni and Catherine Deneuve. One summer, she tells herself that she should rather live her father's life. She now dresses like him, speaks like him, and imitates his physical presence, and she delivers it with such command that others around her end up believing it and begin calling her "Marcello".

== Cast ==
- Chiara Mastroianni as Herself/Marcello
- Catherine Deneuve as Herself
- Fabrice Luchini as Himself
- Nicole Garcia as Herself
- Benjamin Biolay as Himself
- Melvil Poupaud as Himself
- Hugh Skinner as Colin
- Stefania Sandrelli as Herself
- Marlène Saldana as a photographer
- Florence Viala as the wife of Fabrice Luchini
- Laurent Dassault as the owner of the apartment

In the scene of an Italian TV reality show (Da noi... a ruota libera), the presenter is played by RAI television host Francesca Fialdini.

== Production ==
Principal photography began on 21 August 2023 in Paris, and continued in Rome, then in Latina and Formia, the latter of which was a city dear to Marcello Mastroianni. Filming was scheduled to be completed after eight weeks, specifically on 13 October. The film uses French, Italian, and (for the scenes with Colin) English.

The soundtrack consists of songs by Benjamin Biolay ('La Ballade du mois de juin' and 'Comment est ta peine?'), Alex Beaupain ('Dì, Marcello', 'Perché ridi' and 'Toccata tromba'), and excerpts from songs and instrumental works by Luigi Tenco, Rameau, Étienne Daho, Christian Badzura, Puccini, Sibelius, Wagner, Gianni Marchetti, Rota, Fabio Concato and Andrew Bird.

== Release ==
Marcello Mio was selected to compete for the Palme d'Or at the 2024 Cannes Film Festival, where it had its world premiere on 21 May 2024. Ad Vitam Distribution theatrically released the film in France on the same day. Lucky Red theatrically released the film in Italy on 23 May 2024.

The film was invited at 37th Tokyo International Film Festival as the closing film and screened on 6 November 2024.

== Reception ==
=== Critical response ===
On the review aggregator website Rotten Tomatoes, 50% of 28 critics' reviews are positive, with an average rating of 5.1/10. Metacritic, which uses a weighted average, assigned the film a score of 46 out of 100, based on 10 critics, indicating "mixed or average" reviews. On AlloCiné, the film received an average rating of 3.7 out of 5 stars, based on 30 reviews from French critics.

=== Accolades ===
Award	Date of ceremony	Category	Recipient(s)	Result	Ref.
Cannes Film Festival	25 May 2024	Palme d'Or	Christophe Honoré	Nominated	
Cannes Film Festival	25 May 2024	Queer Palm	Christophe Honoré	Nominated	
Sydney Film Festival	16 June 2024	Best Film	Marcello Mio	Nominated	
