= LWB =

LWB may refer to:

- Greenbrier Valley Airport (IATA code: LWB), near Lewisburg, West Virginia
- Libraries without Borders (Bibliothèques Sans Frontières), a French-based educational non-profit
- Life without Barriers, part of the Australian Council of Social Service
- Longwing Blucher (a.k.a. Longwing Brogue), see Brogue shoe
- Long-Wheel-Base, see wheelbase
- Labor and Welfare Bureau, a bureau of the government of HKSAR
- Long Win Bus, a bus company in Hong Kong
- Wide-body aircraft or Large Wide Body Aircraft
- Left wing-back, a position in association football
