= Assaad Bouab =

French actor (born 1980)

- Born: 31 July 1980 (age 46); Aurillac, Cantal, France
- Education: CNSAD
- Occupation: Actor
- Years active: 1997–present

Assaad Bouab (born 31 July 1980) is a French-Moroccan actor whose first co-starring role was in Whatever Lola Wants, directed by Nabil Ayouch and co-starring Laura Ramsey as Lola. The film premiered on 11 December 2007 at the Dubai International Film Festival. Bouab attended Cours Florent from 1999 to 2002, and graduated from CNSAD in Paris in 2006. He has had a regular role in the awarded and popular French television series Call My Agent!.

== Career ==
From 2017 to 2020, Bouab starred as Hicham Janowski in the French comedy-drama series Call My Agent!. He also played CIA operative Qamar Maloof in the Netflix series Messiah.

In 2021, Bouab starred in the romantic drama television miniseries written and directed by Emily Mortimer, The Pursuit of Love alongside Lily James and Andrew Scott. Bouab joined the cast for the sixth and final season of Peaky Blinders in 2022.

== Filmography ==
=== Film ===
Year	Title	Role	Director	Notes
2002	Seventeen Times Cecile Cassard	The Waiter	Christophe Honoré	
2005	Marock	Mao	Laïla Marrakchi	
2005	Zaïna, cavalière de l'Atlas	Kadour	Bourlem Guerdjou	
2006	Days of Glory	Larbi	Rachid Bouchareb	
2007	Whatever Lola Wants	Zack	Nabil Ayouch	
2008	Kandisha	The Cabalist	Jérôme Cohen-Olivar	
2009	Rose et noir	Flocon	Gérard Jugnot	
2010	Outside the Law	Ali	Rachid Bouchareb (2)	
2012	Road Nine	Yanis	Sebastien Rossi	
2014	Fadhma N'Soumer	Boubaghla	Belkacem Hadjadj	
2015	Queen of the Desert	Sheik	Werner Herzog	
2015	Made in France	The Imam	Nicolas Boukhrief	
2015	Le Chant des hommes	H	Bénédicte Liénard & Mary Jimenez	
2016	Ali and Nino	Ilyas	Asif Kapadia	
2020	The Bay of Silence	Pierre Laurent	Paula van der Oest	
2022	Overdose	Richard Cross	Olivier Marchal	
2026	Shadows of Beirut	Rami	Tina Gharavi	
2027	Cliffhanger	TBA	Jaume Collet-Serra	

=== Television ===
Year	Title	Role	Director	Notes
2002	Close to Leo	Aymeric	Christophe Honoré (2)	Television film
2007	Une famille formidable	Walid	Joël Santoni	Episode: "Vacances marocaines"
2013	Le Clan des Lanzac	Brahim Hassani	Josée Dayan	Television film
2015	Homeland	Waleed	Lesli Linka Glatter	Episode: "The Tradition of Hospitality"
2015	Tyrant	Commander Naga	Ciaran Donnelly	Episode: "Desert Storm"
2016	Braquo	Redouane Buzoni	Xavier Palud	8 episodes
2016	Ghoul	Jad	Jean Luc Herbulot, Mehdi El Azam, ...	12 episodes
2016	Cannabis	Jalil Djebli	Lucie Borleteau	2 episodes
2017	Kaboul Kitchen	Yazad	Frédéric Berthe	10 episodes
2017–2020	Call My Agent!	Hicham Janowski	Laurent Tirard	18 episodes
2020	Messiah	Qamar Maalof	Michael Petroni	7 episodes
2021	The Pursuit of Love	Fabrice de Sauveterre	Emily Mortimer	Miniseries, 2 episodes
2021	Pour te retrouver	Alexis	Bruno Garcia	Television film
2022	Inventing Anna	Mehdi Harrak	David Frankel	Episode: "Friends in Low Places"
2022	Peaky Blinders	Henri	Anthony Byrne	2 episodes
2022	Bad Sisters	Gabriel	Dearbhla Walsh, Josephine Bornebusch, Rebecca Garward	6 episodes
2024	Franklin	Pierre Beaumarchais	Tim Van Patten	5 episodes

== Theatre ==
Year	Title	Author	Director
1997	The Italian Straw Hat	Eugène Marin Labiche	Jacques Mandréa
1998	Zadig	Voltaire	Jacques Mandréa (2)
2002	Spring Awakening	Frank Wedekind	Jean-Pierre Garnier
2003	Twelfth Night	William Shakespeare	Andrzej Seweryn
2003	La Reine écartelée	Christian Siméon	Julien Girardet
2004	Phèdre	Jean Racine	Nada Strancar
2004	Hippolyte	Robert Garnier	Nada Strancar (2)
2005	I pettegolezzi delle donne	Carlo Goldoni	Muriel Mayette-Holtz
2009	The Plough and the Stars	Sean O'Casey	Irène Bonnaud
2011	One Thousand and One Nights	Tim Supple & Hanan El-Cheikh	Tim Supple
2023	Phaedra	Simon Stone after Euripides, Seneca and Racine	Simon Stone
