= Geneviève Brisac =

French writer (born 1951)

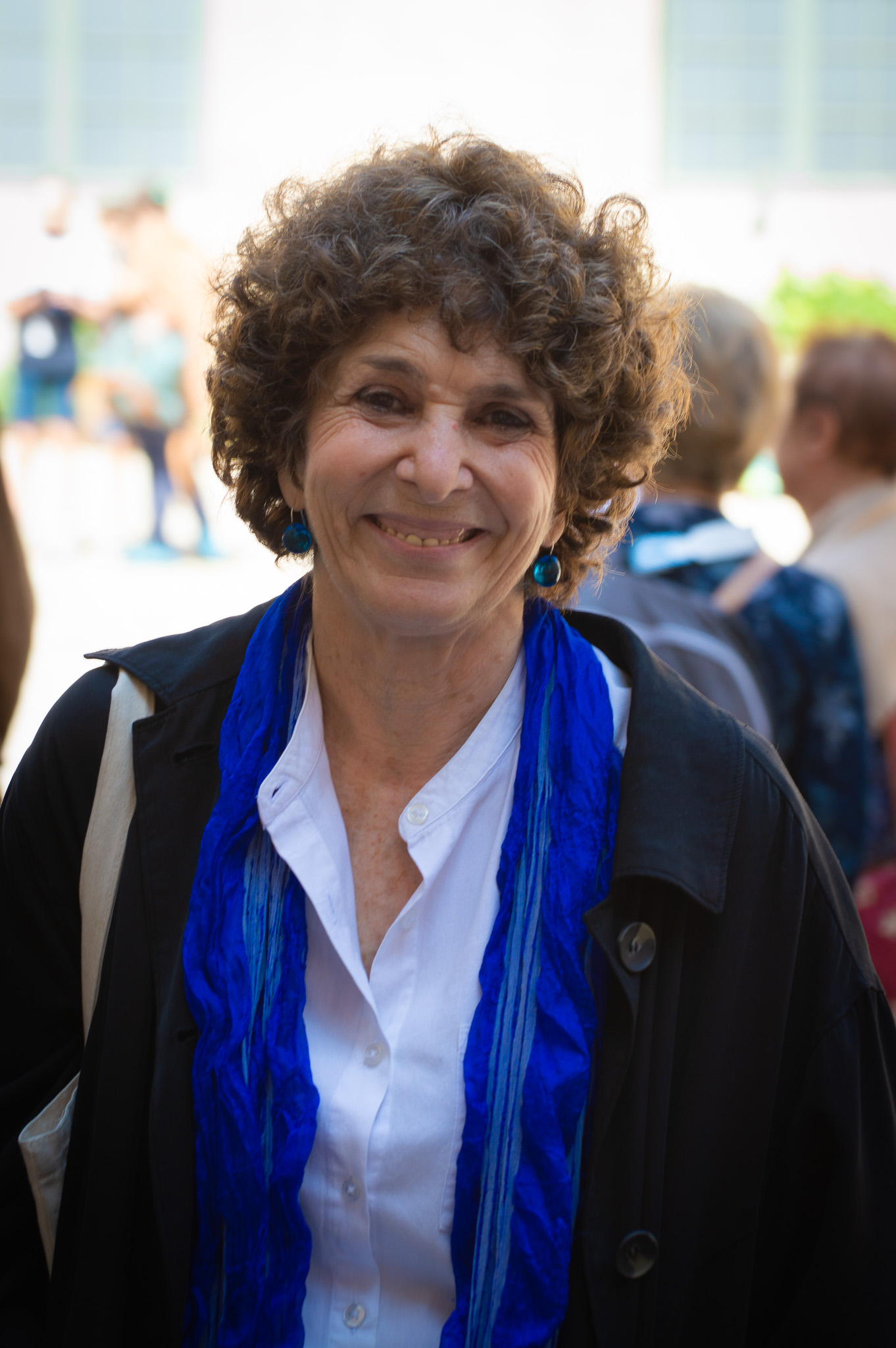
- Geneviève Brisac - Atlantide 2017
- Born: 18 October 1951 (age 74); Paris
- Writing career
- Language: French
- Genres: Novel, screenplay, literary criticism, children's literature, short story
- Notable work: Week-end de chasse à la mère
- Notable awards: Prix Femina

Geneviève Brisac (French pronunciation: [ʒənvjɛv bʁizak]; born 18 October 1951, in Paris) is a French writer.

She is the winner of the Prix Femina in 1996 for Week-end de chasse à la mère, a novel translated in English as Losing Eugenio (2000) and referred to in The New York Times as a "mildly compelling text" and in Publishers Weekly as an "elegant narrative art".

She also writes short stories and children's literature, and is a literary critic for Le Monde, and with Christophe Honoré she co-wrote the screenplay for Honoré's Non Ma Fille, Tu N'iras pas Danser (2009). Plagued by anorexia from childhood, she wrote an "auto-fictional" novel, Petite (1994), in which she recounts her struggle with the disease.

She became very interested in Virginia Woolf, publishing V. W.: le mélange des genres (V. W .: the mixture of genres, with Agnès Desarthe, Paris: Éditions de l'Olivier, 2004), republished under the title of La double vie de Virginia Woolf (Paris: Points, 2008).

Writer, editor, close to the NGO "Bibliothèques Sans Frontières" ("Libraries Without Borders"), she declared her love for books: "Books have saved my life several times. My debt is unlimited.".

== Publications ==
- Madame Placard, Paris, Gallimard, 1989.
- Les filles, Paris, Gallimard, 1997.
- Week-end de chasse à la mère, Paris, Seuil, 1998.
- Une année avec mon père, Paris, Éd. de l'Olivier, 2010.
- Pour qui vous prenez-vous ?, Paris, Éd. de l'Olivier, 2001.
- Petite, Paris, Éditions Points, 2015.
