= Sabahat =

- Gender: Female
- Language: Arabic; Turkish; Urdu

Origin
- Origin: Arabic
- Meaning: "beauty", "grace", "handsomeness"
- Region of origin: Middle East

Sabahat is a feminine Turkish given name of Arabic origin meaning beauty, grace and handsomeness.

Notable people with the name include:

- Sabahat Akkiraz (born 1955), Turkish folk music singer and former Member of Parliament for Istanbul
- Ayda Field born as Ayda Sabahat Evecan (born 1979), American model and actress
- Sabahat Ali Bukhari (born 1968), Pakistani actress
- Sabahat Rasheed (born 1982), Pakistani former cricketer
- Sirak M. Sabahat (born 1981), Israeli actor
