= César Award for Best Original Music =

French film award

- Country: France
- Presented by: Académie des Arts et Techniques du Cinéma
- First award: 1976
- Currently held by: Arnaud Toulon for Arco (2026)
- Website: academie-cinema.org

This is the list of winners and nominees of the César Award for Best Original Music (French: César de la meilleure musique originale). Before 2000, the award was called "César Award for Best Music". With three awards out of eleven nominations, Alexandre Desplat is both the most nominated and most rewarded composer.

== Winners and nominees ==
=== 1970s ===
Year	English title	Original title	Composer
1976	Le Vieux Fusil		François de Roubaix
1976	India Song		Carlos d'Alessio
1976	Let Joy Reign Supreme	Que la fête commence	Philippe d'Orléans and Antoine Duhamel
1976	Un linceul n'a pas de poches		Paul de Senneville and Olivier Toussaint
1977	The Judge and the Assassin	Le Juge et l'Assassin	Philippe Sarde
1977	Barocco		Philippe Sarde
1977	À nous les petites Anglaises		Mort Shuman
1977	The Big Operator	Le Grand Escogriffe	Georges Delerue
1977	Police Python 357		Georges Delerue
1977	Je t'aime moi non plus		Serge Gainsbourg
1978	Providence		Miklos Rozsa
1978	Animal	L'Animal	Vladimir Cosma
1978	Bilitis		Francis Lai
1978	Le Crabe-tambour		Philippe Sarde
1979	Get Out Your Handkerchiefs	Préparez vos mouchoirs	Georges Delerue
1979	The Song of Roland	La Chanson de Roland	Antoine Duhamel
1979	A Simple Story	Une histoire simple	Philippe Sarde
1979	Violette Nozière		Pierre Jansen

=== 1980s ===
Year	English title	Original title	Composer
1980	Love on the Run	L'Amour en fuite	Georges Delerue
1980	Memoirs of a French Whore	La Dérobade	Vladimir Cosma
1980	I as in Icarus	I... comme Icare	Ennio Morricone
1980	Tess		Philippe Sarde
1981	The Last Metro	Le Dernier Métro	Georges Delerue
1981	Atlantic City		Michel Legrand
1981	Je vous aime		Serge Gainsbourg
1981	Death Watch	La Mort en direct	Antoine Duhamel
1982	Diva		Vladimir Cosma
1982	Quest for Fire	La Guerre du feu	Philippe Sarde
1982	The Professional	Le Professionnel	Ennio Morricone
1982	Les Uns et les Autres		Francis Lai and Michel Legrand
1983	The Return of Martin Guerre	Le Retour de Martin Guerre	Michel Portal
1983	La Boum 2		Vladimir Cosma and Francis Lai
1983	The Passerby	La Passante du Sans-Souci	Georges Delerue
1983	Une chambre en ville		Michel Colombier
1984	Le Bal		Vladimir Cosma
1984	Équateur		Serge Gainsbourg
1984	One Deadly Summer	L'Été meurtrier	Georges Delerue
1984	So Long, Stooge	Tchao Pantin	Charlélie Couture
1985	Les Cavaliers de l'orage		Michel Portal
1985	L'Amour à mort		Hans Werner Henze
1985	Paroles et Musique		Michel Legrand
1985	Rue barbare		Bernard Lavilliers
1986	Tangos, the Exile of Gardel	Tangos, l'exil de Gardel	José Luis Castiñeira de Dios and Astor Piazzolla
1986	Bras de fer		Michel Portal
1986	He Died with His Eyes Open	On ne meurt que deux fois	Claude Bolling
1986	Subway		Éric Serra
1987	Round Midnight	Autour de minuit	Herbie Hancock
1987	Betty Blue	37°2 le matin	Gabriel Yared
1987	Jean de Florette		Jean-Claude Petit
1987	Tenue de soirée		Serge Gainsbourg
1988	Field of Honor	Champ d'honneur	Michel Portal
1988	Agent trouble		Gabriel Yared
1988	Les Innocents		Philippe Sarde
1989	The Big Blue	Le Grand Bleu	Éric Serra
1989	Camille Claudel		Gabriel Yared
1989	Itinerary of a Spoiled Child	Itinéraire d'un enfant gâté	Francis Lai

=== 1990s ===
Year	English title	Original title	Composer
1990	Life and Nothing But	La Vie et rien d'autre	Oswald d'Andrea
1990	Monsieur Hire		Michael Nyman
1990	Love Without Pity	Un monde sans pitié	Gérard Torikian
1991	Cyrano de Bergerac		Jean-Claude Petit
1991	My Father's Glory	La gloire de mon père	Vladimir Cosma
1991	My Mother's Castle	Le château de ma mère	Vladimir Cosma
1991	La Femme Nikita	Nikita	Éric Serra
1992	All the Mornings of the World	Tous les matins du monde	Jordi Savall
1992	Delicatessen		Carlos D'Alessio
1992	The Double Life of Véronique	La double vie de Véronique	Zbigniew Preisner
1992	Mayrig		Jean-Claude Petit
1993	The Lover	L'amant	Gabriel Yared
1993	Dien Bien Phu	Diên Biên Phu	Georges Delerue
1993	Indochine		Patrick Doyle
1993	Savage Nights	Les nuits fauves	René-Marc Bini
1994	1, 2, 3, Sun	Un, deux, trois, soleil	Khaled
1994	Germinal		Jean-Louis Roques
1994	Three Colors: Blue	Trois couleurs: Bleu	Zbigniew Preisner
1994	Les Visiteurs		Eric Lévi
1995	Three Colors: Red	Trois couleurs: Rouge	Zbigniew Preisner
1995	La fille de d'Artagnan		Philippe Sarde
1995	Léon		Éric Serra
1995	Queen Margot	La reine Margot	Goran Bregović
1996	Élisa		Michel Colombier, Serge Gainsbourg and Zbigniew Preisner
1996	The City of Lost Children	La cité des enfants perdus	Angelo Badalamenti
1996	The Horseman on the Roof	Le hussard sur le toit	Jean-Claude Petit
1996	Nelly and Mr. Arnaud	Nelly et Monsieur Arnaud	Philippe Sarde
1997	Microcosmos	Microcosmos: Le peuple de l'herbe	Bruno Coulais
1997	Ridicule		Antoine Duhamel
1997	A Self Made Hero	Un héros très discret	Alexandre Desplat
1997	Unpredictable Nature of the River	Les caprices d'un fleuve	René-Marc Bini
1998	Western		Bernardo Sandoval
1998	The Fifth Element		Éric Serra
1998	Marquise		Jordi Savall
1998	On Guard	Le bossu	Philippe Sarde
1998	Same Old Song	On connaît la chanson	Bruno Fontaine
1999	The Crazy Stranger	Gadjo dilo	Tony Gatlif
1999	Chance or Coincidence	Hasards ou coïncidences	Claude Bolling and Francis Lai
1999	Jeanne and the Perfect Guy	Jeanne et le garçon formidable	Philippe Miller
1999	Taxi		Akhenaton

=== 2000s ===
Year	English title	Original title	Composer
2000	Himalaya	Himalaya - l'enfance d'un chef	Bruno Coulais
2000	The Children of the Marshland	Les enfants du marais	Pierre Bachelet
2000	East/West	Est - Ouest	Patrick Doyle
2000	The Messenger: The Story of Joan of Arc		Éric Serra
2001	I Come	Vengo	Tony Gatlif, La Caita, Sheikh Ahmad Al Tuni and Tomatito
2001	The Crimson Rivers	Les rivières pourpres	Bruno Coulais
2001	Harry, He's Here to Help	Harry, un ami qui vous veut du bien	David Whitaker
2001	Saint-Cyr		John Cale
2002	Amélie	Le fabuleux destin d'Amélie Poulain	Yann Tiersen
2002	Brotherhood of the Wolf	Le pacte des loups	Joseph LoDuca
2002	Read My Lips	Sur mes lèvres	Alexandre Desplat
2002	Winged Migration	Le peuple migrateur	Bruno Coulais
2003	The Pianist		Wojciech Kilar
2003	8 Women	8 femmes	Krishna Levy
2003	Amen.		Armand Amar
2003	Safe Conduct	Laissez-passer	Antoine Duhamel
2004	The Triplets of Belleville	Les triplettes de Belleville	Benoît Charest
2004	Bon voyage		Gabriel Yared
2004	Mr. N	Monsieur N.	Stephan Eicher
2004	Not on the Lips	Pas sur la bouche	Bruno Fontaine
2005	The Chorus	Les choristes	Bruno Coulais
2005	Exils		Tony Gatlif and Delphine Mantoulet
2005	The Light	L'équipier	Nicola Piovani
2005	A Very Long Engagement	Un long dimanche de fiançailles	Angelo Badalamenti
2006	The Beat That My Heart Skipped	De battre mon coeur s'est arrêté	Alexandre Desplat
2006	Live and Become	Va, vis et deviens	Armand Amar
2006	March of the Penguins	La marche de l'empereur	Émilie Simon
2006	Merry Christmas	Joyeux Noël	Philippe Rombi
2007	Tell No One	Ne le dis à personne	-M-
2007	Azur & Asmar: The Princes' Quest	Azur et Asmar	Gabriel Yared
2007	Days of Glory	Indigènes	Armand Amar
2007	The Page Turner	La tourneuse de pages	Jérôme Lemonnier
2007	Private Fears in Public Places	Cœurs	Mark Snow
2008	Love Songs	Les chansons d'amour	Alex Beaupain
2008	Intimate Enemies	L'ennemi intime	Alexandre Desplat
2008	Let's Dance	Faut que ça danse!	Archie Shepp
2008	Persepolis		Olivier Bernet
2008	A Secret	Un secret	Zbigniew Preisner
2009	Séraphine		Michael Galasso
2009	The First Day of the Rest of Your Life	Le premier jour du reste de ta vie	Sinclair
2009	I've Loved You So Long	Il y a longtemps que je t'aime	Jean-Louis Aubert
2009	Paris 36	Faubourg 36	Reinhardt Wagner
2009	Public Enemy Number One: Part 1 and 2	L'instinct de mort and L'ennemi public n°1	Marco Beltrami and Marcus Trumpp

=== 2010s ===
Year	English title	Original title	Composer
2010	Le Concert		Armand Amar
2010	Making Plans for Lena	Non ma fille, tu n'iras pas danser	Alex Beaupain
2010	A Prophet	Un prophète	Alexandre Desplat
2010	In the Beginning	À l'origine	Cliff Martinez
2010	Welcome	Welcome	Nicola Piovani
2011	The Ghost Writer		Alexandre Desplat
2011	Oceans		Bruno Coulais
2011	The Tree	L'Arbre	Grégoire Hetzel
2011	Liberté		Delphine Mantoulet and Tony Gatlif
2011	Bus Palladium		Yarol Poupaud
2011	The Princess of Montpensier	La Princesse de Montpensier	Philippe Sarde
2012	The Artist		Ludovic Bource
2012	Beloved	Les Bien-aimés	Alex Beaupain
2012	House of Tolerance	L'Apollonide: Souvenirs de la maison close	Bertrand Bonello
2012	A Monster in Paris	Un monstre à Paris	Matthieu Chedid and Patrice Renson
2012	The Minister	L'Exercice de l'État	Philippe Schoeller
2013	Rust and Bone	De rouille et d'os	Alexandre Desplat
2013	Farewell, My Queen	Les Adieux à la reine	Bruno Coulais
2013	Populaire		Rob and Emmanuel D'Orlando
2013	Camille Rewinds	Camille redouble	Joseph Dahan and Gaëtan Roussel
2013	In the House	Dans la maison	Philippe Rombi
2014	Michael Kohlhaas		Martin Wheeler
2014	Bicycling with Molière	Alceste à bicyclette	Jorge Arriagada
2014	Mood Indigo	L'Écume des jours	Étienne Charry
2014	Venus in Fur	La Vénus à la fourrure	Alexandre Desplat
2014	Chinese Puzzle	Casse-tête chinois	Loïk Dury and Christophe Minck
2015	Timbuktu		Amine Bouhafa
2015	Girlhood	Bande de filles	Jean-Baptiste de Laubier
2015	Bird People		Béatrice Thiriet
2015	Love at First Fight	Les Combattants	Lionel Flairs, Benoît Rault and Philippe Deshaies
2015	Yves Saint Laurent		Ibrahim Maalouf
2016	Mustang		Warren Ellis
2016	Cowboys	Les Cowboys	Raphaël Haroche
2016	Come What May	En mai, fais ce qu'il te plaît	Ennio Morricone
2016	Mon roi		Stephen Warbeck
2016	My Golden Days	Trois souvenirs de ma jeunesse	Grégoire Hetzel
2017	In the Forests of Siberia	Dans les forêts de Sibérie	Ibrahim Maalouf
2017	Chocolat		Gabriel Yared
2017	Elle		Anne Dudley
2017	Frantz		Philippe Rombi
2017	My Life as a Courgette	Ma vie de courgette	Sophie Hunger
2018	BPM (Beats per Minute)	120 battements par minutes	Arnaud Rebotini
2018	See You Up There	Au revoir là-haut	Christophe Julien
2018	Raw	Grave	Jim Williams
2018	Bloody Milk	Petit Paysan	Myd
2018	Faces Places	Visages, villages	Matthieu Chedid
2019	Guy		Romain Greffe and Vincent Blanchard
2019	The Sisters Brothers	Les frères Sisters	Alexandre Desplat
2019	In Safe Hands	Pupille	Pascal Sangla
2019	An Impossible Love	Un amour impossible	Grégoire Hetzel
2019	Amanda		Anton Sanko
2019	The Trouble with You	En Liberté!	Camille Bazbaz

=== 2020s ===
Year	Winner and nominees	Original title	Composer(s)
2020 (45th)	I Lost My Body	J'ai perdu mon corps	Dan Levy
2020 (45th)	Atlantics	Atlantique	Fatima Al Qadiri
2020 (45th)	An Officer and a Spy	J'accuse	Alexandre Desplat
2020 (45th)	Les Misérables		Marco Casanova and Kim Chapiron
2020 (45th)	Oh Mercy!	Roubaix, une lumière	Grégoire Hetzel
2021 (46th)	La Nuit Venue		Rone
2021 (46th)	Bye Bye Morons	Adieu les cons	Christophe Julien
2021 (46th)	DNA	ADN	Stephen Warbeck
2021 (46th)	My Donkey, My Lover & I	Antoinette dans les Cévennes	Mateï Bratescot
2021 (46th)	Summer of 85	Été 85	Jean-Benoït Dunckel
2022 (47th)	Annette		Ron Mael and Russell Mael
2022 (47th)	BAC Nord		Guillaume Roussel
2022 (47th)	Black Box	Boîte noire	Philippe Rombi
2022 (47th)	Paris, 13th District	Les Olympiades	Rone
2022 (47th)	The Velvet Queen	La panthère des neiges	Nick Cave and Warren Ellis
2023 (48th)	Full Time	À plein temps	Irène Drésel
2023 (48th)	Final Cut	Coupez!	Alexandre Desplat
2023 (48th)	The Innocent	L'Innocent	Grégoire Hetzel
2023 (48th)	The Night of the 12th	La Nuit du 12	Olivier Marguerit
2023 (48th)	Pacifiction		Marc Verdaguer and Joe Robinson
2023 (48th)	The Passengers of the Night	Les Passagers de la nuit	Anton Sanko
2024 (49th)	The Animal Kingdom	Le Règne animal	Andrea Laszlo De Simone
2024 (49th)	Disco Boy		Vitalic
2024 (49th)	Junkyard Dog	Chien de la casse	Delphine Malausséna
2024 (49th)	Just the Two of Us	L'Amour et les Forêts	Gabriel Yared
2024 (49th)	The Three Musketeers: D'Artagnan and The Three Musketeers: Milady	Les Trois Mousquetaires: D'Artagnan / Les Trois Mousquetaires: Milady	Guillaume Roussel
2025 (50th)	Emilia Pérez		Clément Ducol and Camille
2025 (50th)	Beating Hearts	L'Amour ouf	Jon Brion
2025 (50th)	The Count of Monte Cristo	Le Comte de Monte-Cristo	Jérôme Rebotier
2025 (50th)	Holy Cow	Vingt Dieux	Linda Courvoisier and Charlie Courvoisier
2025 (50th)	The Most Precious of Cargoes	La Plus Précieuse des marchandises	Alexandre Desplat
2026 (51st)	Arco		Arnaud Toulon
2026 (51st)	Case 137	Dossier 137	Olivier Marguerit
2026 (51st)	The Stranger	L'Étranger	Fatima Al Qadiri
2026 (51st)	The Richest Woman in the World	La femme la plus riche du monde	Alex Beaupain
2026 (51st)	The Little Sister	La Petite Dernière	Amine Bouhafa

== See also ==
- Academy Award for Best Original Score
- BAFTA Award for Best Original Music
- European Film Award for Best Composer
- Golden Globe Award for Best Original Score
- Goya Award for Best Original Score
- Lumière Award for Best Music
- Magritte Award for Best Original Score
