= I Am Jonas =

2018 French LGBT film

- Film poster
- Directed by: Christophe Charrier
- Written by: Christophe Charrier
- Produced by: Sandrine Brauer; Marie Masmonteil
- Starring: Félix Maritaud; Nicolas Bauwens; Tommy-Lee Baïk
- Cinematography: Pierre Baroin
- Edited by: Stéphanie Dumesnil
- Music by: Alex Beaupain
- Production companies: Arte; En Compagnie des Lamas
- Release date: 28 August 2018 (Dekkoo)
- Running time: 82 minutes
- Country: France
- Language: French

I Am Jonas is a French coming of age same-sex-themed film released in 2018 and directed by Christophe Charrier. The film is also known as Boys and Jonas.

== Plot ==
The plot is written in chronological order while the movie switches continuously between present and past.

It is 1997. Fifteen-year-old Jonas does not really have friends at school. When the school year starts, there is a new pupil in his class: Nathan, who immediately takes Jonas under his wing and they become friends. Nathan has a Nintendo Game Boy and teaches Jonas how to play Tetris and eventually gives him the console as a gift. The two fall in love and start a relationship. Jonas is allowed by his parents to spend the weekend at Nathan's house. Nathan's mother is heavily pregnant and has already chosen a name for the child: Léonard. She drives the boys to a movie theatre, and on the ride they pass an amusement park called Magic World. Mother reveals to Jonas that Nathan got the scar on his face after an incident at the bumper cars, although Nathan had earlier told Jonas that it was caused by an attack of a pedophile priest. At the end of the movie they just watched, Nathan turns on his mobile phone and hears a message left by his mother: she went into hospital to give birth. Instead of going to the hospital, they go to Boys, a local bar for same-sex-attracted men. As the minimum age for admission is eighteen years old, they are not allowed in. This is noticed by a man who has an idea: he will bring the boys to another bar for men who are same-sex attracted where there is no age limit. They get in his car but soon Nathan gets suspicious as the ride takes too long and the boys plead with the driver to let them out. The driver punches Nathan and knocks him out. Jonas pulls up the handbrake and is able to escape. The car drives away with a closeup of Nathan – still in the car – and Jonas not knowing whether he is alive or dead.

== Cast ==
- Félix Maritaud – Jonas Cassetti (adult)
- Nicolas Bauwens – Jonas Cassetti (adolescent)
- Tommy-Lee Baïk – Nathan
- Aure Atika – Nathan's mother
- Marie Denarnaud – Jonas' mother
- Pierre Cartonnet – Jonas' father
- Ilian Bergala – Léonard
- Ingrid Granziani – Caroline Rivasso (adult)
- Édith Saulnier – Caroline Rivasso (adolescent)
- David Baiot – Samuel

== Release and reception ==
The film was originally released as Boys on the streaming platform Dekkoo in August 2018. It was then screened as Jonas at the Festival de la fiction TV de La Rochelle in September, where it won three awards, including Best TV Movie. In November 2018, it was broadcast on French TV channel Arte, attracting over 1,12 million viewers. It was subsequently premiered on Netflix under its final title, I Am Jonas.

On review aggregator Rotten Tomatoes, the film holds an approval rating of 100% based on six reviews, with an average rating of 7.7/10. Writing for The Guardian, André Wheeler described the film as a "dark, atmospheric [and] delightful slow-burn".
