= Dans Paris =

2006 film by Christophe Honoré

- Theatrical release poster
- Directed by: Christophe Honoré
- Written by: Christophe Honoré
- Produced by: Paulo Branco
- Starring: Romain Duris; Louis Garrel; Guy Marchand; Joana Preiss; Alice Butaud; Marie-France Pisier
- Cinematography: Jean-Louis Vialard
- Edited by: Chantal Hymans
- Music by: Alex Beaupain
- Production companies: Gemini Films; Clap Filmes
- Distributed by: Gemini Films
- Release dates: 25 May 2006 (Cannes); 4 October 2006 (France)
- Running time: 92 minutes
- Country: France
- Language: French
- Box office: $1.8 million

Dans Paris (English: Inside Paris) is a 2006 French romantic comedy-drama film written and directed by Christophe Honoré and starring Romain Duris, Louis Garrel, Guy Marchand, Joana Preiss, Alice Butaud and Marie-France Pisier.

== Plot ==
After ending a volatile relationship with his long-term girlfriend Anna, Paul moves back in with his divorced father Mirko and younger brother Jonathan in their apartment in Paris. While attempting to pull Paul out of his depression, Jonathan engages in a series of sexual encounters with women around the city.

== Cast ==
- Romain Duris as Paul
- Louis Garrel as Jonathan
- Guy Marchand as Mirko
- Joana Preiss as Anna
- Alice Butaud as Alice
- Marie-France Pisier as the mother
- Helena Noguerra as the scooter girl
- Judith El Zein as the girl who thinks it is going to rain
- Annabelle Hettmann as the girl in the window
- Mathieu Funck-Brentano as the boy with the cigarette
- Lou Rambert Preiss as Loup

== Release ==
The film was screened at the 2006 Cannes Film Festival, the 2006 Vienna International Film Festival, the 2006 BFI London Film Festival, the 2006 Flanders International Film Festival Ghent, the 2007 Rio de Janeiro International Film Festival, the 2007 São Paulo International Film Festival, and the 2007 San Francisco International Film Festival.

== Reception ==
At Rotten Tomatoes, the film holds an approval rating of 60% based on 53 reviews, and an average rating of 6.25/10. The website's critics consensus reads, "Director Christophe Honore updates the pretensions and the charms of the French New Wave for Dans Paris, his poignant yet frustratingly dense film." At Metacritic, which assigns a normalized rating to reviews, the film has a weighted average score of 60 out of 100, based on 15 critics, indicating "mixed or average reviews".

Manohla Dargis of The New York Times praised the film's "playful, liberatory style", which she found reminiscent of the best films of the French New Wave. Paul Schrodt of Slant Magazine gave the film 3 out of 4 stars, writing, "As reckless as love itself, the movie has its ups and downs, but you can't help but be touched by it."

At the 32nd César Awards, Guy Marchand was nominated for the Best Supporting Actor award.
