= Live and Become =

- Theatrical poster
- Directed by: Radu Mihaileanu
- Written by: Alain-Michel Blanc; Radu Mihaileanu
- Produced by: Denis Carot; Marie Masmonteil; Radu Mihaileanu; Marek Rozenbaum; Itai Tamir
- Starring: Mekonet Ageza; Moshe Abebe; Sirak M. Sabahat; Yael Abecassis; Roschdy Zem; Roni Hadar; Rami Danon; Raymonde Abecassis; Mimi Abonesh Kebede; Meskie Shibru-Sivan Hadar
- Narrated by: Patrick Descamps
- Cinematography: Rémy Chevrin
- Edited by: Ludo Troch
- Music by: Armand Amar
- Distributed by: Les Films du Losange
- Release dates: 11 February 2005 (Berlin); 30 March 2005 (France)
- Running time: 140 minutes
- Countries: France; Israel
- Languages: French; Amharic; Hebrew
- Budget: €5.3 million
- Box office: $3.7 million

Live and Become (French: Va, vis et deviens) is a 2005 French drama film about an Ethiopian Christian boy who is infiltrated among Ethiopian Jews in order to escape famine and to emigrate to Israel. The film follows his growing up and living as a Jew in Israel. It was directed by Romanian-born Radu Mihăileanu. It won awards at the Berlin and Vancouver and other film festivals.

== Plot ==
In 1984, Schlomo, a nine-year-old Ethiopian boy, is placed by his Christian mother with an Ethiopian Jewish woman whose own son has just died. This woman is about to be airlifted from a Sudanese refugee camp to Israel as part of Operation Moses. Schlomo’s birth mother, who hopes for a better life for him, tells him "Go, live, and become," as he reluctantly leaves her to board the bus to the plane.

Shortly after arrival in Israel, the second mother dies. After living in a home for orphans, where he behaves badly, Schlomo is adopted by a tolerant family but remains depressed until he secretly sends a letter to the refugee camp of his birth mother. During his upbringing in Israel, both he and his adoptive parents experience racial prejudice. In his teens Schlomo meets a Jewish girl named Sarah, whose father is an extreme racist, and they fall in love. Schlomo tries to gain credibility as a Jew by winning a competition in Jewish religious interpretation. Despite his winning, Sarah's father's attitude is unchanged. Disappointed Schlomo goes to the police and reports himself as not being Jewish, but the police officer tells him off saying: “the newspapers are full of that stuff, the Falashas are no Jews. Now they begin to believe it themselves."

Schlomo leaves Israel and studies medicine in France. When he returns and marries Sarah, she is disowned by her family. But Schlomo dares not tell he is not Jewish until she becomes pregnant. Then she leaves him, but only because he had lied to her. His adoptive mother reconciles them, Sarah says on returning to him "Unbelievable what three mothers would do for you." But she makes it a condition that Schlomo must trace his birth mother. He takes a job as a doctor in an Ethiopian refugee camp where one day he accidentally finds her still alive.

== Cast ==
- Moshe Agazai as Child Schlomo
- Moshe Abebe as Teenage Schlomo
- Sirak M. Sabahat as Adult Schlomo
- Yael Abecassis as Yael Harrari
- Roschdy Zem as Yoram Harrari
- Roni Hadar as Sarah
- Rami Danon as Papy
- Raymonde Abecassis as Suzy
- Mimi Abonesh Kebede as Hana
- Meskie Shibru-Sivan Hadar as Schlomo's mother
- Yitzhak Edgar as Qes Amhra
- Aaron Vodovoz as Kibbutz Boy
- Joy Rieger as Tali

== Accolades ==
=== International ===
Award / Film Festival	Category	Recipients and nominees	Result
Berlin International Film Festival	Panorama Audience Award (feature film)		Won
Berlin International Film Festival	Europa Cinemas Label		Won
Berlin International Film Festival	Prize of the Ecumenical Jury (Panorama)		Won
César Awards	Best Film		Nominated
César Awards	Best Director	Radu Mihaileanu	Nominated
César Awards	Best Original Screenplay	Alain-Michel Blanc and Radu Mihaileanu	Won
César Awards	Best Original Music	Armand Amar	Nominated
Copenhagen International Film Festival	Best Film		Won
Copenhagen International Film Festival	Best Script	Alain-Michel Blanc and Radu Mihaileanu	Won
Cinemania (film festival)	Prix du public		Won
Globes de Cristal Award	Best Film		Nominated
Lumière Awards	World Audience Award		Won
Toronto International Film Festival	People's Choice Award		Runner-up
Vancouver International Film Festival	Audience Award (international film)		Won

=== In the United States ===
Audience Awards unless otherwise noted

- Boston Jewish Film Festival
- Washington Jewish Film Festival
- Miami Jewish Film Festival
- Atlanta Jewish Film Festival
- Detroit Jewish Film Festival (Best Film)
- San Diego Jewish Film Festival
- Orange County Jewish Film Festival
- Palm Desert Jewish Film Festival
- Palm Beach Jewish Film Festival
- Tampa Jewish Film Festival
- Seattle Jewish Film Festival
- Cleveland International Film Festival
- Nashville Film Festival
- Los Angeles Jewish Film Festival
- Detroit Jewish Film Festival (Audience Award)
- Washington DC International Film Festival (Runner-Up)
- Aspen Filmfest
