= To Life (film) =

- Theatrical release poster
- French: À la vie
- Directed by: Jean-Jacques Zilbermann
- Written by: Danièle D'Antoni; Jean-Jacques Zilbermann; Odile Barski (collaboration)
- Produced by: Denis Carot; Marie Masmonteil
- Starring: Julie Depardieu; Johanna ter Steege; Suzanne Clément
- Cinematography: Rémy Chevrin
- Edited by: Joële van Effenterre
- Music by: Eric Slabiak
- Production companies: Elzévir Films; France 3 Cinéma
- Distributed by: Le Pacte
- Release dates: 11 August 2014 (Locarno); 26 November 2014 (France)
- Running time: 104 minutes
- Country: France
- Language: French
- Box office: $375,520

To Life (original title: À la vie) is a 2014 French drama film directed and co-written by Jean-Jacques Zilbermann. The film was presented in the Piazza Grande section at the 2014 Locarno International Film Festival. The film stars Julie Depardieu, Johanna ter Steege and Suzanne Clément.

== Plot ==
The film was inspired by the story of Irene Zilbermann, the director's mother, a Holocaust survivor, although the names are changed and particulars fictionalized.

Three women who met in Auschwitz reconnect 15 years later during a seaside holiday in Berck-Plage.

== Cast ==
- Julie Depardieu as Hélène
- Johanna ter Steege as Lili
- Suzanne Clément as Rose
- Hippolyte Girardot as Henri
- Mathias Mlekuz as Raymond
- Benjamin Wangermée as Pierre

== Accolades ==
Award	Category	Recipients and nominees	Result
Lumière Awards	Best Cinematography	Rémy Chevrin	Won
