= Close to Leo =

- Film poster
- Written by: Diastème; Christophe Honoré
- Directed by: Christophe Honoré
- Music by: Alex Beaupain; Doc Mateo
- Country of origin: France
- Original language: French

Production
- Producers: Sophie Deloche; Serge Moati
- Cinematography: Rémy Chevrin
- Editor: Chantal Hymans

Original release
- Release: 2002

Close to Leo (French: Tout contre Léo) is a 2002 French TV film directed by Christophe Honoré. It is also known as Everything Against Leo.

== Plot ==
Leo (Pierre Mignard), is the eldest of four brothers. Marcel (Yannis Lespert), age 10, is the youngest. With their young parents, they are a happy and close-knit family. One evening, Marcel overhears his family discussing the news that Leo is HIV-positive. They all agree to protect Marcel from the news, even though Leo wants to tell his little brother, not only that he has HIV, but that he is gay.

The family continues pretending everything is fine to Marcel, but the young boy is devastated and starts behaving badly. Marcel wants the truth, but neither his parents nor his brothers can bring themselves to speak openly about it. Marcel is just on the edge of puberty and is sometimes childish and sometimes mature and sensitive. When he is excluded from a midnight ocean swim by his brothers, he follows them to the beach demanding to be included.

Leo takes Marcel off to Paris so that he can visit an old boyfriend and explain both himself and his situation to his young brother.

Marcel understands that Leo is very unhappy with his situation, and sees him decide to stop taking his medication. Leo cannot cope with the stress and puts Marcel on a train back home to Brittany, asking the boy to lighten the atmosphere back home.

== Cast ==
- Yaniss Lespert as Marcel
- Pierre Mignard as Léo
- Marie Bunel as Mother
- Dominic Gould as Father
- Rodolphe Pauly as Tristan
- Jérémie Lippmann as Pierrot
- Louis Gonzales as Yvan
- Joana Preiss as Yvan's mother
- Assaad Bouab as Aymeric
