= Sophie's Misfortunes (2016 film) =

- Theatrical release poster
- Les Malheurs de Sophie
- Directed by: Christophe Honoré
- Written by: Christophe Honoré; Gilles Taurand
- Based on: The Misfortunes of Sophie by Countess of Ségur
- Produced by: Philippe Martin; David Thion
- Starring: Caroline Grant; Anaïs Demoustier; Muriel Robin; Golshifteh Farahani
- Cinematography: André Chemetoff
- Edited by: Chantal Hymans
- Music by: Alex Beaupain; David Sztanke
- Production companies: Les Films Pelléas; France 3 Cinéma; Gaumont
- Distributed by: Gaumont
- Release dates: 20 March 2016 (Valenciennes); 20 April 2016 (France)
- Running time: 106 minutes
- Country: France
- Language: French
- Box office: $4 million

Sophie's Misfortunes (French: Les Malheurs de Sophie) is a 2016 French film written and directed by Christophe Honoré, based on the novel of the same name by the Countess of Ségur.

== Plot ==
From her castle, the little Sophie can not resist the temptation of the forbidden and what she loves most is to do stupid things with her cousin Paul. When her parents decide to emigrate to America, Sophie is delighted. A year later, she is back in France with her horrible stepmother, Mrs. Fichini. But Sophie can count on the help of her two friends, also little girls together with their mother, Madame de Fleurville to escape the clutches of that woman.

== Cast ==
- Caroline Grant as Sophie de Réan
- Anaïs Demoustier as Madame de Fleurville
- Golshifteh Farahani as Madame Èvelyne de Réan
- Muriel Robin as Madame Fédora Fichini
- Michel Fau as Father Huc
- Céleste Carrale as Camille de Fleurville
- Aélys Le Nevé as Marguerite de Rosbourg
- Marlene Saldana as Madame Chantal de Rosbourg
- Jean-Charles Clichet as Baptistin
- David Prat as Joseph
- Lætitia Dosch as Noémie
- Tristan Farge as Paul d'Aubert
- Elsa Lepoivre as Madame Florence d'Auber
- Annie Mercier as Marianne
- Antoine Reinartz

== Production ==
Filming began on 12 January 2015; the second part of this shoot was completed in summer 2015.
