= Seventeen Times Cecile Cassard =

2002 film

- Film poster
- Directed by: Christophe Honoré
- Written by: Christophe Honoré
- Produced by: Philippe Jacquier; Béatrice Mauduit
- Starring: Béatrice Dalle
- Cinematography: Rémy Chevrin
- Edited by: Chantal Hymans
- Music by: Alex Beaupain
- Distributed by: ARP Sélection
- Release date: 10 July 2002
- Running time: 105 minutes
- Country: France
- Language: French
- Budget: $2.3 million
- Box office: $360,000

Seventeen Times Cecile Cassard (French: 17 fois Cécile Cassard) is a 2002 French drama film directed by Christophe Honoré. It was screened in the Un Certain Regard section at the 2002 Cannes Film Festival.

== Cast ==
- Béatrice Dalle as Cécile Cassard
- Romain Duris as Matthieu
- Jeanne Balibar as Edith
- Ange Ruzé as Erwan
- Johan Oderio-Robles as Lucas
- Tiago Manaïa as Tiago
- Jérôme Kircher as Thierry
- Julien Collet as Stéphane
- Jérémy Sanguinetti as Julien
- Marie Bunel as The teacher
- Assaad Bouab as The waiter
- Fabio Zenoni as The porch man
- Robert Cantarella as The cemetery man
