= Love Songs (2007 film) =

- French release poster
- French: Les Chansons d'amour
- Directed by: Christophe Honoré
- Written by: Christophe Honoré
- Produced by: Paulo Branco
- Starring: Louis Garrel; Ludivine Sagnier; Clotilde Hesme; Chiara Mastroianni
- Cinematography: Rémy Chevrin
- Edited by: Chantal Hymans
- Music by: Alex Beaupain
- Production company: Alma Films
- Distributed by: BAC Films
- Release dates: 18 May 2007 (Cannes); 23 May 2007 (France)
- Running time: 100 minutes
- Country: France
- Language: French
- Box office: $3 million

Love Songs (French: Les Chansons d'amour) is a 2007 French musical film written and directed by Christophe Honoré. A homage to Jacques Demy, it stars Louis Garrel, Ludivine Sagnier and Clotilde Hesme in the lead roles as an dysfunctional threesome relationship.

The film had its world premiere in the main competition of the 2007 Cannes Film Festival on 18 May 2007, where it was nominated for the Palme d'Or. It was theatrically released in France on 23 May 2007 by BAC Films.

== Plot ==
The film is divided into three parts: The Departure, The Absence and The Return.

=== The Departure ===
The film begins with Julie Pommeraye walking the streets of Paris; she goes to a cinema and from the tickets queue calls her boyfriend Ismaël Bénoliel on her cell phone. He is at work with Alice, but when Julie asks him he lies and says he is alone. Julie responds that he pisses her off. Later that night, Ismaël runs into Julie on his way home. They discuss Julie's frustrations about their relationship and eventually, already in their apartment, reconcile. Shortly afterwards Alice arrives; they all get into bed together, read a different book each and fight about each one's place in bed.

The next day Julie and Ismaël have breakfast with Julie's family; Julie gets frustrated and leaves for the kitchen, followed by her older sister, Jeanne. Julie tells Jeanne and later her mother about Alice and the threesome. In the night, after Ismaël, Julie and Alice leave a bar where they were eating, Julie starts complaining about Ismaël's relationship with Alice; Ismaël responds that her jealousy is ironic considering she also has a sexual relationship with Alice, but that she is truly the only one he loves. Alice tells them that she is only there to bring them together. They go to a concert where Alice befriends a guy named Gwendal. Julie starts feeling bad, so she and Ismaël decide to leave. Outside, Julie collapses and suddenly dies.

=== The Absence ===
Going to work, Ismaël runs into Jeanne on her way to his and Julie's apartment. At work, he confronts Alice about his constant breakdowns since Julie's death and she comforts him. Since Jeanne is staying in Ismaël's apartment, he doesn't want to spend the night there, so Alice takes him to Gwendal's apartment.

Ismaël spends the entire night awake; in the morning he meets Erwann, Gwendal's younger brother who also lives there, and who before leaving for school offers Ismaël his room so he can finally get some sleep. Erwann returns and wakes Ismaël up, who borrows some clean clothes from Erwann and leaves for work. Later that night, he discovers Erwann has been following him. Erwann asks to go home with Ismaël, who rejects him. Ismaël gets to his apartment to find Jeanne still there, so he goes to Erwann's apartment to spend the night again.

The next day, Ismaël visits Julie's family. Later, upset over Julie, he spends the night with a bartender called Maud. Jeanne discovers the two of them in the apartment the next morning, but Ismaël dresses quickly and sneaks out as Jeanne and Maud chat.

=== The Return ===
Ismaël goes to work to find Erwann waiting for him; he tells Erwann that he is flattered by his attention but is neither interested nor in need of him. Alice, having broken up with Gwendal, thinks Erwan had been sent by his brother to pick up the set of keys she had; she gives them to Ismaël to pass them on to Erwann. Leaving work, Ismaël finds Erwann waiting for him again. He returns the keys but then takes them back, and the two of them go to Ismaël's apartment.

Meanwhile, Alice receives a phone call from Julie's mother and the two of them meet at a restaurant, where Julie's mother asks her to take care of Ismaël. Jasmine, Julie's other sister, comes to tell her mother that her father is upset that she is still out so late at night, so she leaves. Alice and Jasmine briefly discuss their grief.

Ismaël and Erwann sleep together that night. Jeanne lets herself into Ismaël's apartment, discovers Erwann there, and leaves. He follows her into the street where they walk and she explains that she is trying to understand his process of grief, and admits his disinterest in children and threesome arrangement with Julie and Alice can finally be explained by his homosexuality. He neither confirms nor denies this, and the two part unreconciled and upset.

Erwann goes to Ismaël's office only to find Alice. He confirms that he and Ismaël are in the midst of a fling he hopes will develop further. Meanwhile, Ismaël, upset, visits Julie's grave and battles with his guilt over both not visiting sooner and his many sexual exploits since her death as a means of coping. Alice eventually finds him drunk at a bar and takes him to Erwann's, who invites him to stay. Ismaël explains that he will continue their affair as long as Erwann is comfortable not hearing that Ismaël loves him, and Erwann says Ismaël can stay as long as he is okay hearing he is loved. On the roof, Ismaël tells Erwann to "love him less but love him for a long time" and they kiss as Alice looks on from below.

=== References to Jacques Demy's work ===
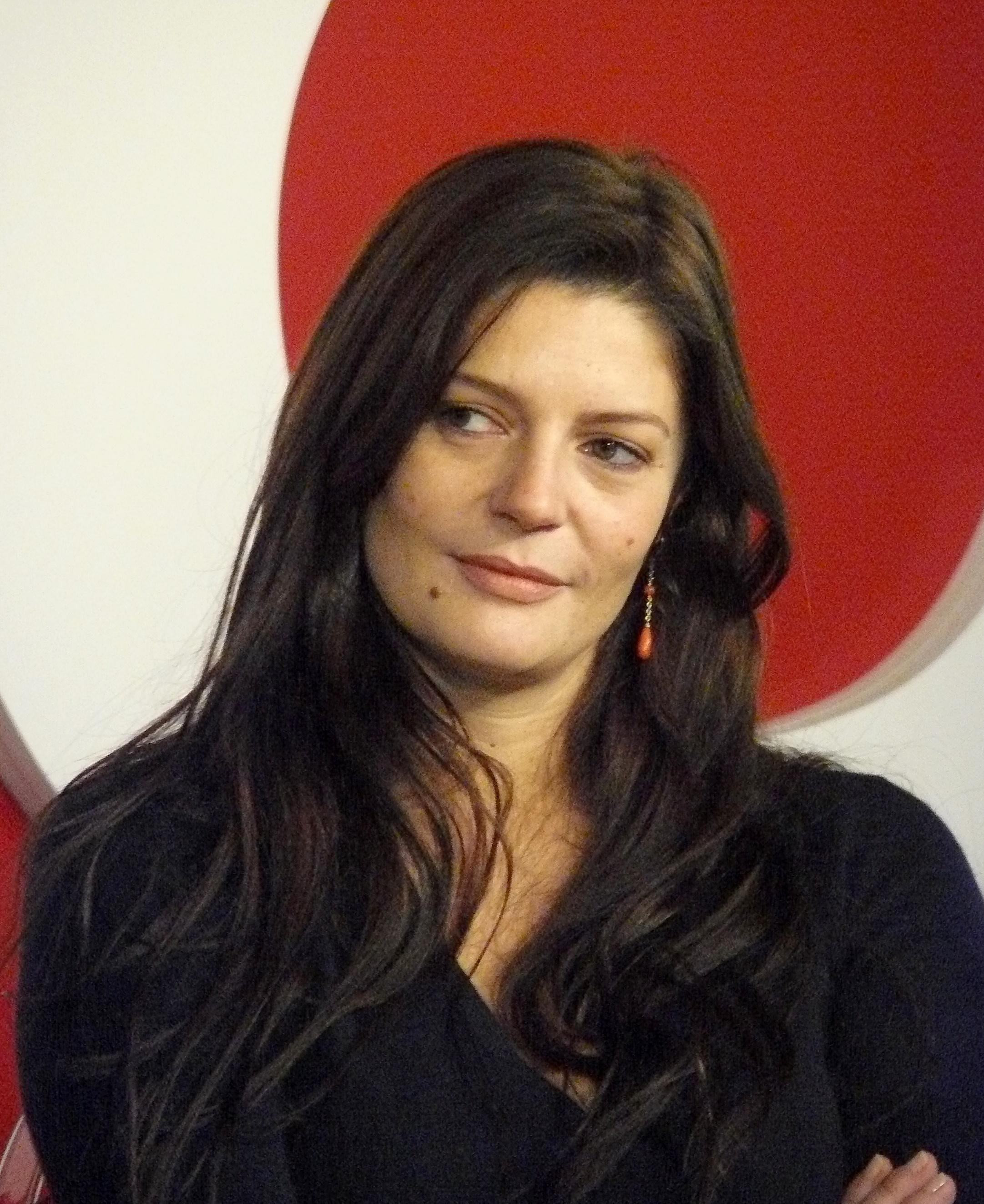
Chiara Mastroianni, Catherine Deneuve daughter

This film refers to many other cinematographic works but the most obvious one is to Jacques Demy's film The Umbrellas of Cherbourg and, more widely, to Demy's work. The layout of both films is divided into three parts: The Departure, The Absence, and The Return. Furthermore, as a nod to the French actress Catherine Deneuve (the main character of The Umbrellas of Cherbourg), her daughter, Chiara Mastroianni, performs in the role of Julie's sister. The two have a scene where they wear the Epiphany crown, being filmed the same way.

This film is also in tribute to The Young Girls of Rochefort as some sailors appear unexpectedly in a street in Paris, and to Lola and A Room in Town, two other musical films of Jacques Demy, because Julie's last name (Pommeraye) is also the name of The Passage Pommeraye of Nantes, seen in these films.

== Cast ==
- Louis Garrel as Ismaël Bénoliel
- Ludivine Sagnier as Julie Pommeraye
- Clotilde Hesme as Alice
- Grégoire Leprince-Ringuet as Erwann
- Chiara Mastroianni as Jeanne, Julie's older sister
- Brigitte Roüan as Julie's mother
- Alice Butaud as Jasmine, Julie's sister
- Jean-Marie Winling as Julie's father
- Yannick Renier as Gwendal, Erwann's brother
- Esteban Carvajal-Alegria as Erwann's friend
- Annabelle Hettmann as Maude, bar server

== Release ==
=== Box office ===
The film grossed a total of $2,966,934 worldwide—$104,567 in the United States and Canada and $2,862,367 in other territories.

== Accolades ==
| Award/Film Festival | Category | Recipients and nominees | Result |
|---|---|---|---|
| Cannes Film Festival | Palme d'Or | | Nominated |
| Cabourg Film Festival | Best Director | Christophe Honoré | Won |
| César Award | Most Promising Actor | Grégoire Leprince-Ringuet | Nominated |
| César Award | Most Promising Actress | Clotilde Hesme | Nominated |
| César Award | Best Original Music | Alex Beaupain | Won |
| César Award | Best Sound | Guillaume Le Braz, Valérie Deloof, Agnès Ravez and Thierry Delor | Nominated |
| Globes de Cristal Award | Best Actress | Ludivine Sagnier | Nominated |
| Lumière Awards | Most Promising Actress | Clotilde Hesme | Nominated |

== Reviews ==
- Bradshaw, Peter (14 December 2007). "Les Chansons d'Amour". The Guardian. London.
- Dawson, Thomas (7 December 2007). "Love Songs (Les Chansons d'Amour)". BBC News.
- Forbes, Harry (2008). "Love Songs (Les Chansons D'Amour)". Catholic News Service. Archived from the original on 4 October 2009.
- Hanks, Robert (14 December 2007). "Les Chansons d'Amour". The Independent. London.
- Ide, Wendy (18 May 2007). "Les Chansons D'Amour". The Times. London.
- Scott, A. O. (19 March 2008). "Parisians Singing From Bed to Bed". The New York Times. New York. Archived from the original on 2008-03-21.
- Sotinel, Thomas (20 May 2007). "'Les Chansons d'amour': petit arrangement musical avec la mort". Le Monde (in French). Paris.
- Thomson, Desson (June 6, 2008). "Love Songs". The Washington Post. Archived from the original on November 13, 2012.
- Wiegand, David (6 June 2008). "'Love Songs' hums with tangled emotions". San Francisco Chronicle.
- Weissberg, Jay (18 May 2007). "Love Songs". Variety.
