= Whatever Lola Wants (film) =

- Directed by: Nabil Ayouch
- Written by: Nabil Ayouch; Jane Hawksley; Nathalie Saugeon
- Produced by: Jake Eberts
- Starring: Laura Ramsey; Assaad Bouab; Carmen Lebbos; Hichem Rostom; Achmed Akkabi; Nadim Sawalha
- Cinematography: Vincent Mathias
- Edited by: Hervé de Luze
- Music by: Krishna Levy
- Production companies: The 7th Floor; Ali'n Productions; B.C. Films; Pathé
- Distributed by: Pathé Distribution
- Release date: December 11, 2007 (Dubai International Film Festival)
- Running time: 115 minutes
- Countries: Canada; France
- Languages: English; Arabic
- Budget: $8,000,000 (apx)
- Box office: $655,467

Whatever Lola Wants is a 2007 French-Canadian romantic drama film directed by Nabil Ayouch. The film had its world premiere on December 11, 2007 at the Dubai International Film Festival and stars Laura Ramsey as an American postal worker who travels to Egypt to seek out a legendary belly dancer.

In his book Film in the Middle East and North Africa Josef Gugler commented that at the time of its release, the film had a larger budget than any previous Moroccan film and was one of the highest grossing Moroccan films for 2008.

== Plot ==
Lola (Laura Ramsey) is a female postal worker who dreams of becoming an Oriental dancer. After a friend encourages her to perform at a local restaurant, Lola captures the attention of the handsome Zack (Assaad Bouab). Lola follows after him, but is crushed to find that Zack is to marry someone of his family's choosing. Lola decides to turn all of her energy into making her dreams a reality and tracks down Ismahan (Carmen Lebbos), a reclusive dancing star who retired due to a scandal involving a mysterious lover. Although reluctant, Ismahan is persuaded into giving Lola lessons and a friendship blossoms as a result.

In no time Lola becomes a professional-level dancer and attracts the interest of Nasser Radi (Hichem Rostom), a famous impresario. He takes her under his wing and under his tutelage Lola gets to dance at the prestigious Nile Tower. During this time Lola discovers that Nasser was Ismahan's lover and that the two were kept apart because of social conventions but also because of their own pride. As Lola's career takes off, she manages to help reunite the two former lovers before returning to New York in order to bring the art she loves to her fellow Americans.

== Cast ==
- Laura Ramsey as Lola
- Assaad Bouab as Zack
- Carmen Lebbos as Ismahan
- Hichem Rostom as Nasser
- Achmed Akkabi as Yussef
- Nadim Sawalha as Adham
- Mariam Fakhr Eddine as Mrs. Aida
- Abdelkader Lofti as Choukri
- Roz Ryan as Postal Worker
- Hend Sabri as Fayza
- Milia Ayache as Yasmine

== Reception ==
Critical reception for Whatever Lola Wants has been mixed, and Variety wrote that "despite a considerable number of cringe-inducing moments early on, the sheer brio of the heroine's cross-cultural antics will win over auds by the end." The Screen Daily wrote a mixed review, stating "Shot brightly in artsy-melodrama mode and garnished with an Arab-fusion soundtrack by Krishna Levy and TransGlobal Underground, Whatever Lola Wants is a polished film, but in the end it never really decides whether it wants to be a prettily packaged star-is-born tale or an all-guns-blazing social critique." The Hollywood Reporter was also mixed, stating that while the film's music and dancing was a highlight, it ultimately "fails to engage".

== Release ==
On December 11, 2007, the film premiered at the Dubai International Film Festival in the United Arab Emirates. It screened in France and Norway the following year, in South Korea in 2009, and in Taiwan in 2010. Its television premiere was on HBO Hungary in 2011 as Amit Csak Lola Akar.

In 2009, it had DVD premieres in France, the Netherlands, Sweden, and Finland.
