= Rémy Chevrin =

French cinematographer

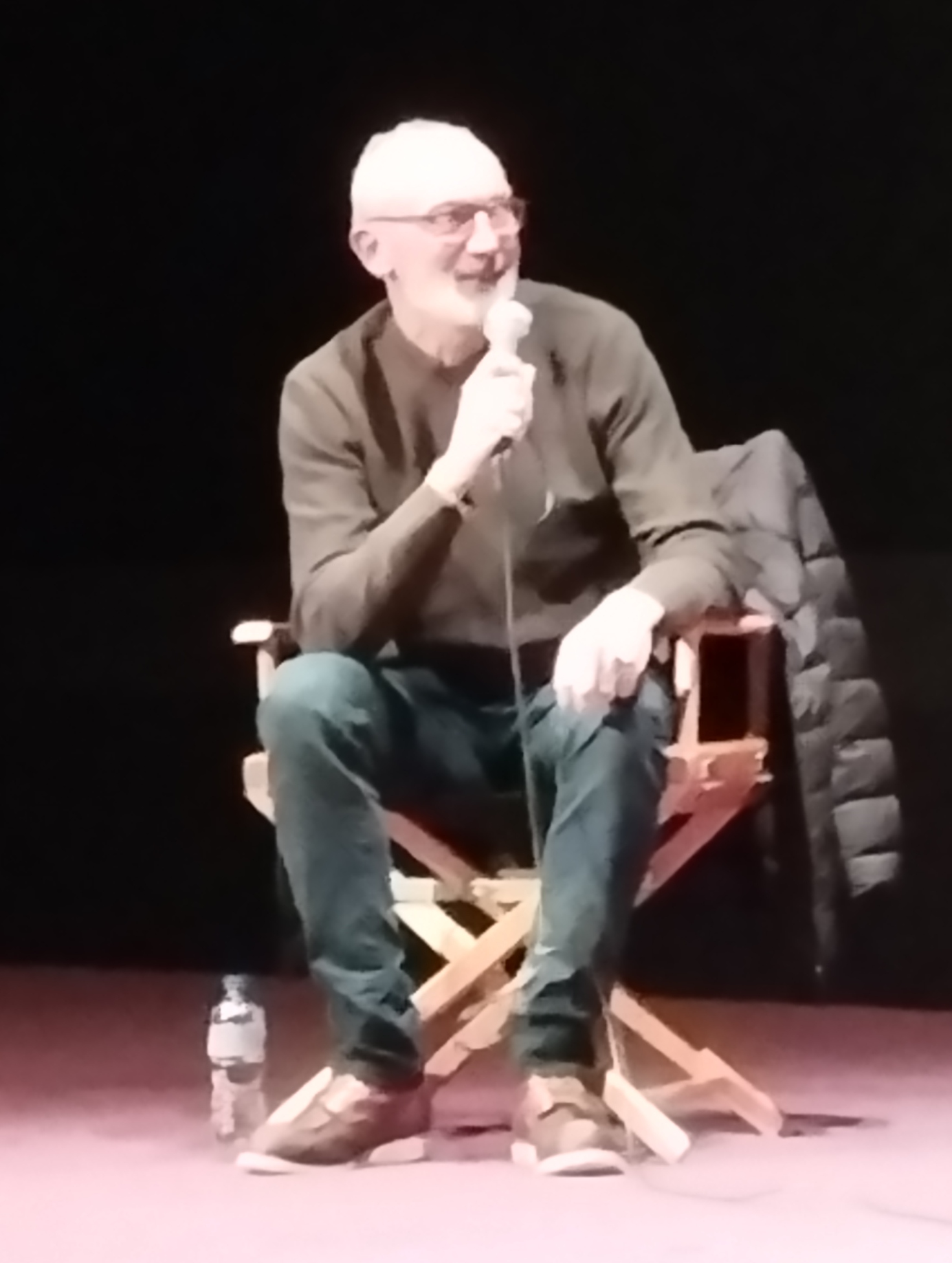
- Born: 12 April 1963 (age 62); France
- Occupation: Cinematographer

Rémy Chevrin (born 12 April 1963) is a French cinematographer. Before his first full-length features he began as assistant to Darius Khondji.

== Filmography ==
| Year | Title | Director | Notes |
|---|---|---|---|
| 1986 | Jean de Florette | Claude Berri | assistant camera |
| 1986 | Manon des Sources | Claude Berri | assistant camera |
| 1986 | Sur les talus | Laurence Ferreira Barbosa | Short assistant camera |
| 1988 | Une femme pour l'hiver | Manuel Flèche | Short assistant camera |
| 1989 | Embrasse-moi | Michèle Rosier | assistant camera |
| 1990 | What She Wrote | Tim Southam | Short cinematographer |
| 1991 | Delicatessen | Marc Caro; Jean-Pierre Jeunet | first assistant camera |
| 1991 | Le trésor des îles chiennes | F.J. Ossang | first assistant camera |
| 1991 | Le trou de la corneille | François Hanss | Short cameraman |
| 1992 | Terra Fria | Antonio Campos | assistant camera |
| 1992 | Chut... | Karin Albou | Short cinematographer |
| 1993 | 23h58 | Pierre-William Glenn | cameraman |
| 1993 | Dober Man | Tim Southam | Short cinematographer |
| 1994 | Parano | Manuel Flèche, ... | cinematographer |
| 1994 | Les mickeys | Thomas Vincent | Short cinematographer |
| 1997 | Les voisins | Artus de Penguern | Short cinematographer |
| 1998 | Docteur Chance | F.J. Ossang | cinematographer |
| 1998 | Ça ne se refuse pas | Eric Woreth | cinematographer |
| 1998 | La polyclinique de l'amour | Artus de Penguern | Short cinematographer |
| 2000 | Princesses | Sylvie Verheyde | cinematographer |
| 2001 | Pas d'histoires! | Philippe Lioret | cinematographer |
| 2001 | My Wife Is an Actress | Yvan Attal | cinematographer |
| 2002 | Seventeen Times Cecile Cassard | Christophe Honoré | cinematographer |
| 2002 | Close to Leo | Christophe Honoré | TV movie cinematographer |
| 2003 | M. Ibrahim and the Flowers of the Koran | François Dupeyron | cinematographer |
| 2003 | Carcan | Stéphane Levallois | Short cinematographer |
| 2004 | Happily Ever After | Yvan Attal | cinematographer |
| 2005 | Live and Become | Radu Mihăileanu | cinematographer |
| 2006 | Those Happy Days | Éric Toledano and Olivier Nakache | cinematographer |
| 2007 | Love Songs | Christophe Honoré | cinematographer |
| 2009 | Cinéman | Yann Moix | cinematographer |
| 2009 | Tomorrow at Dawn | Denis Dercourt | cinematographer |
| 2009 | Tellement proches | Éric Toledano and Olivier Nakache | cinematographer |
| 2010 | Bus Palladium | Christopher Thompson | cinematographer |
| 2011 | Beloved | Christophe Honoré | cinematographer |
| 2011 | Delicacy | Stéphane & David Foenkinos | cinematographer |
| 2013 | Rue Mandar | Idit Cebula | cinematographer |
| 2013 | Grand départ | Nicolas Mercier | cinematographer |
| 2014 | To Life | Jean-Jacques Zilbermann | cinematographer |
| 2015 | Bis | Dominique Farrugia | cinematographer |
| 2016 | The Jews | Yvan Attal | cinematographer |
| 2017 | Le Brio | Yvan Attal | cinematographer |
| 2017 | Tout là-haut | Serge Hazanavicius | cinematographer |
| 2017 | Sous le même toit | Dominique Farrugia | cinematographer |
| 2018 | Sorry Angel | Christophe Honoré | cinematographer |
| 2019 | Andy | Julien Weill | cinematographer |
| 2019 | My Dog Stupid | Yvan Attal | cinematographer |
| 2019 | On a Magical Night | Christophe Honoré | cinematographer |
| 2020 | Claire Andrieux | Olivier Jahan | TV movie cinematographer |
| 2021 | Guermantes | Christophe Honoré | cinematographer |
| 2021 | The Accusation | Yvan Attal | cinematographer |
| 2021 | On est fait pour s'entendre | Pascal Elbé | cinematographer |
| 2021 | Service volé | Jérôme Foulon | TV movie cinematographer |
| 2022 | Winter Boy | Christophe Honoré | cinematographer |
| 2022 | Tendre et saignant | Christopher Thompson | cinematographer |
| 2023 | Breaking Point | Yvan Attal | cinematographer |
