= Sorry Angel =

2018 film

- French theatrical release poster
- Directed by: Christophe Honoré
- Written by: Christophe Honoré
- Produced by: Philippe Martin; David Thion
- Starring: Vincent Lacoste; Pierre Deladonchamps; Denis Podalydès
- Cinematography: Rémy Chevrin
- Edited by: Chantal Hymans
- Production companies: Les Films Pelléas; Arte France Cinéma; Canal+; Ciné+; Centre national du cinéma et de l'image animée; Cinémage 12; Cofinova 14; Palatine Etoile 15
- Distributed by: Ad Vitam
- Release dates: 10 May 2018 (Cannes); 10 May 2018 (France)
- Running time: 132 minutes
- Country: France
- Language: French
- Budget: $4 million
- Box office: $1.6 million

Sorry Angel (French: Plaire, aimer et courir vite) is a 2018 French romantic drama film directed by Christophe Honoré. It was selected to compete for the Palme d'Or at the 2018 Cannes Film Festival.

== Plot ==
Set in 1993, Jacques (Pierre Deladonchamps) is a 39-year-old gay author living and working in Paris. He is a part-time, albeit inattentive, father to his young son Loulou, who stays with him every other night. Loulou is accustomed to his father's bouts of self-indulgent melancholy as well as his manic appreciation for the arts and his string of young lovers. At the same time, Jacques is in the process of coming to terms with his health's steady decline due to AIDS, which is simultaneously and severely affecting his ex-lover Marco. When Marco is rejected by his lover Thierry and comes to stay with Jacques, the two discuss again their intentions to commit suicide before they can be claimed by the disease. Jacques lives on the floor below his good friend Mathieu (Denis Podalydès), an older gay man and newspaper editor who regular caters to Jacques's flamboyant episodes.

In the meantime, Jacques meets 22-year-old Arthur (Vincent Lacoste), a student and camp counselor, during a work event in Brittany. Arthur is in the throes of a relatively newfound homosexual lifestyle, and he finds himself disenchanted by his generation's rejection of literature and shame of sex; for these reasons, he is drawn to Jacques and his intellectualism. Jacques understands his own reticence to commit to a proper relationship because of a current fling with the young Jean-Marie, and because of his AIDS, but finds himself immensely interested in Arthur. Despite Jacques's intentions to keep things platonic, the two sleep together a few times before Jacques returns home to Paris.

As Jacques's AIDS worsens—not a problem for Arthur, who accepts him wholeheartedly—Arthur comes to visit, during which Jacques admits that he has attempted to reject Arthur because he refuses to die stricken by grief that a new love must be over too soon. Arthur appreciates Jacques's lyrical philosophies but cannot accept that he must let Jacques go—or that Jacques could truly want him to. The two spend an evening with Mathieu that ends with Arthur's proclamation that the two "could make a good life together", eventually returning to Brittany to inform his friends he is moving to Paris to be with Jacques.

Arthur waits for Jacques to return his calls in order to finalise their plans, completely unaware that he is in the midst of organising his suicide. Jacques brings his life's diaries to Mathieu and says his goodbyes, never returning Arthur's final call.

== Cast ==
- Pierre Deladonchamps as Jacques Tondelli
- Vincent Lacoste as Arthur Prigent
- Denis Podalydès as Matthieu
- Quentin Thébault as Jean-Marie
- Sophie Letourneur as Isabelle
- Thomas Gonzalez as Marco
- Tristan Farge as Louis 'Loulou'

== Production ==
Principal photography commenced with shooting in Binic (Côtes-d'Armor) on 12 and 13 June 2017. Filming lasted a total of 36 shooting days in June, July and August 2017, at locations in the cities of Rennes and Paris, as well as a brief shoot in Amsterdam.

== Awards ==
The film was awarded the Louis Delluc Prize for Best Film in 2018.
