= Kéthévane Davrichewy =

French writer (born 1965)

Kéthévane Davrichewy (born 1965) is a French writer of Georgian origin.

== Biography ==
She was born in Paris in 1965. Her childhood was marked by her grandparents' experience of exile. She studied literature, cinema and theatre, lived in New York and worked as a journalist for a while. In 1996, she compiled several Georgian tales for the publisher L'École des Loisirs, which has since brought out several more of her works for younger readers. She also writes scripts for the screen.

In 2004, she published her first novel Tout ira bien (Editions Arlea), which was eventually adapted for the stage with the involvement of the musician Alex Beaupain. In 2010, she published a novel inspired by the dramatic story of her Georgian family, La Mer Noire, which won numerous prizes: Prix Landernau 2010, Prix Version Femina/Virgin Megastore 2010, Prix Prince Maurice 2011, etc. It was also translated into German, Georgian, Italian, Dutch, etc.

In 2012, she published Les Séparées (Sabine Wespieser) which was a commercial and critical success and was nominated for the prix RTL/Lire. This was followed by Quatre Murs (2014), and then L’Autre Joseph (2016), a novel featuring her grandfather Joseph Davrichachvili and Joseph Stalin, who also had Georgian origins. It won the Prix des Deux Magots in 2017.
