= Ludivine Sagnier =

French actress (born 1979)

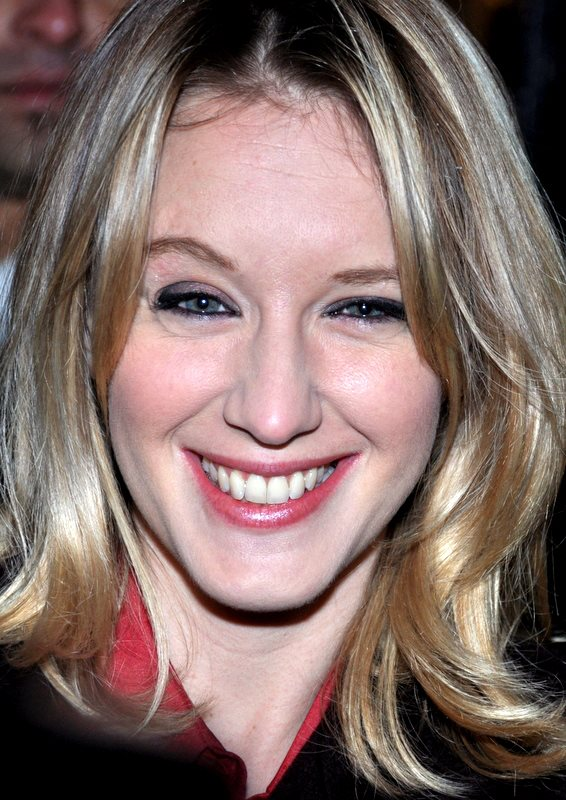
- Sagnier in 2013
- Born: 3 July 1979 (age 47); La Celle-Saint-Cloud, Yvelines, France
- Occupation: Actress
- Years active: 1989–present
- Partner: Kim Chapiron
- Children: 3

Ludivine Sagnier (born 3 July 1979) is a French actress, known to international audiences for the films Swimming Pool and Peter Pan (both 2003), and the Netflix series Lupin (2021–present). She has also appeared in the English-language series The Young Pope (2016) and The Serpent Queen (2022–2024).

Sagnier has been nominated for the César Award for Best Supporting Actress three times, for her performances in 8 Women (2002), Swimming Pool (2003), and A Secret (2007).

== Early life ==
Sagnier was born on 3 July 1979 in La Celle-Saint-Cloud, in the département of Yvelines, France, and grew up in Sèvres. Her mother is a retired secretary and her father is a professor of English at the University of Paris. She has one sister, Delphine. As a child, Sagnier underwent abdominal surgery to remove a benign tumor from her intestine, resulting in a surgical scar on her abdomen. Following this surgery, she also fell ill with meningitis, from which she recovered.

Sagnier studied piano at a young age but disliked performing music, and instead opted to take acting classes with her parents' permission. Commenting on this, she said: "My only desire was to escape classical music. In my family, everyone is a musician. I took piano lessons and I hated this instrument. To escape it and music theory, I asked to take acting classes. It was during one of them that I was noticed for a casting. And I was accepted. It then took me years to understand that this was the profession I wanted to pursue."

== Career ==
=== 1989–2003 ===
She made her film debut at the age of nine in Les Maris, les Femmes, les Amants (1989), directed by Pascal Thomas, and had other minor roles in the early 1990s, including an appearance in Cyrano de Bergerac with Gerard Depardieu.

Sagnier's career began in earnest in adulthood, as she gained commercial and critical success for her performances in three films directed by François Ozon: Water Drops on Burning Rocks (2000), 8 Women (2002), and Swimming Pool (2003). 8 Women was awarded acting prizes for Sagnier and her seven co-stars collectively.

In Swimming Pool, a psychological thriller, she starred alongside Charlotte Rampling. Sagnier received significant international media attention for performing several nude scenes in the film, having previously also done so in Water Drops on Burning Rocks; she would later express disappointment that this led directors in the United States to attempt to typecast her in sexually explicit roles. Nonetheless her work in Swimming Pool earned her several accolades, including a nomination for Best Supporting Actress at the César Awards. Also in 2003, Sagnier played Tinker Bell in P.J. Hogan's live-action adaptation of J.M. Barrie's Peter Pan. Initially, she had been brought in to provide inspiration to the film's visual effects department for a CGI model that was being created for the character, but she impressed the production team with her performance and was cast in the role.

=== 2004–2020 ===
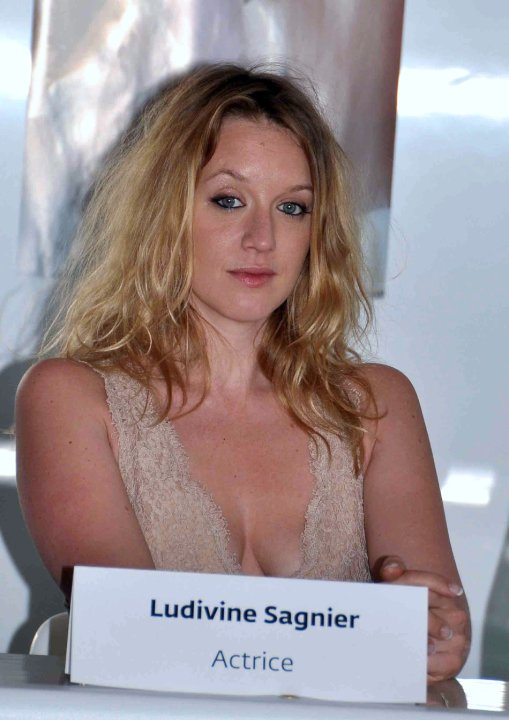
Sagnier at the 2010 Cannes Film Festival

Despite being primed for a lucrative international career in the wake of Swimming Pool and Peter Pan, Sagnier chose to focus primarily on French cinema, stating that she felt uncomfortable with the competitive nature of the Hollywood film industry. She subsequently appeared in French films including Love Songs (2007), A Secret (2007), which garnered her another César nomination for Best Supporting Actress, and Mesrine (2008). 2011 saw her return to international work with a role in the biographical drama The Devil's Double. In 2016, she appeared alongside Jude Law in the Paolo Sorrentino-directed miniseries The Young Pope, later reprising her role in the follow-up series The New Pope (2020).

=== 2021–present ===
Since 2021 Sagnier has starred in the Netflix-produced crime thriller series Lupin as Claire Laurent, the estranged wife of protagonist Assane Diop (Omar Sy) and the mother to their son Raoul, whom she is raising alone. Loosely based on the Arsène Lupin stories written by Maurice Leblanc, the show became an international hit, and has been regarded as one of Netflix' most successful series in a language other than English. Sagnier's performance as Claire has received praise from critics, with Robert Lloyd of the Los Angeles Times writing that "like Sy, [she] brings a lot of soul to her part ... and the two actors have great chemistry."

Following the success of Lupin, Sagnier was cast in several English-language historical dramas. In the STARZ series The Serpent Queen (2022–2024), about the life and rise to power of Catherine de' Medici, she portrayed Catherine's rival Diane de Poitiers. Sagnier said that she was drawn to the role of Diane because she was interested in playing an antagonist, something she had seldom done in her career prior to then. She also made an appearance as Thérésa Tallien in Ridley Scott's biopic Napoleon (2023), though her performance was cut from the theatrical version of the film, and played composer Anne Louise Brillon de Jouy in the Apple TV+ miniseries Franklin (2024), about Benjamin Franklin's expedition to France during the time of the American Revolutionary War.

In 2024, Sagnier featured in the film adaptation of Nicolas Mathieu's novel And Their Children After Them, and reunited with François Ozon after a two-decade hiatus in their creative relationship for When Fall Is Coming. That same year she was nominated for a Molière Award for her performance in Le Consentement, a one-woman play based on the memoir of the same name by Vanessa Springora.

== Personal life ==
Sagnier gave birth to a daughter in 2005, with her then boyfriend, actor Nicolas Duvauchelle. She is in a relationship with her partner, director Kim Chapiron, with whom she has two daughters.

In a 2019 podcast interview with journalist Frédéric Taddeï, Sagnier stated that the politician she admired most was left-wing former Minister of Justice of France Christiane Taubira. In 2024, she was one of 230 artists who signed a petition calling on president Emmanuel Macron to officially recognize the state of Palestine.

Since 2020, Sagnier has developed and taught an acting course at the École Kourtrajmé. The school, founded in 2018 by director Ladj Ly in his native Montfermeil, provides training to students from disadvantaged and minority backgrounds who are interested in pursuing careers in the dramatic arts and the film industry.

== Filmography ==
Key
†	Denotes films that have not yet been released

=== Film ===
Year	Title	Role	Director	Notes
1989	Les Maris, les Femmes, les Amants	Élodie	Pascal Thomas	
1989	I Want to Go Home	La petite fille de la place du village	Alain Resnais	
1990	Le pont du silence	La petite fille	Martine Bureau	short film
1990	Cyrano de Bergerac	The little sister	Jean-Paul Rappeneau	
1999	Mon frère	Sophie	Matthias Fégyvères	short film
1999	Le ciel, les oiseaux,... et ta mère!	dance girl #1	Djamel Bensalah	
1999	Rembrandt	Cornelia van Rijn	Charles Matton	
1999	Children of the Century	Hermine de Musset	Diane Kurys	
1999	Acide animé	Anna	Guillaume Bréaud	short film
2000	Water Drops on Burning Rocks	Anna	François Ozon	
2000	Bon plan	Clémentine	Jérôme Lévy	
2001	Un jeu d'enfants	Daphnée	Laurent Tuel	
2001	My Wife Is an Actress	Géraldine	Yvan Attal	
2002	8 Women	Catherine	François Ozon	
2002	Les frères Hélias	Victoire	Frédy Busso	short film
2003	Petites coupures	Nathalie	Pascal Bonitzer	
2003	La légende de Parva	Lula	Jean Cubaud	voice role
2003	Swimming Pool	Julie	François Ozon	
2003	La Petite Lili	Lili	Claude Miller	
2003	Peter Pan	Tinker Bell	P. J. Hogan	
2005	Une aventure	Gabrielle	Xavier Giannoli	
2005	Foon	La reine du bal de l'an dernier	Les Quiches	
2006	Paris, je t'aime	Claire	Alfonso Cuarón	segment: "Parc Monceau"
2006	French California	Helène	Jacques Fieschi	
2006	Toothache	Anna	Ian Simpson	
2006	Coup de sang	La serveuse	Jean Marbœuf	
2007	Molière	Célimène	Laurent Tirard	
2007	Love Songs	Julie Pommeraye	Christophe Honoré	
2007	A Girl Cut in Two	Gabrielle Aurore Deneige	Claude Chabrol	
2007	A Secret	Hannah Golda Stirn/Grinberg	Claude Miller	
2008	Mesrine	Sylvia Jeanjacquot	Jean-François Richet	
2010	Lily Sometimes	Lily Dreyer	Fabienne Berthaud	
2010	Love Crime	Isabelle Guérin	Alain Corneau	
2011	The Devil's Double	Sarrab	Lee Tamahori	
2011	Beloved	young Madeleine	Christophe Honoré	
2011	A Monster in Paris	Maud	Bibo Bergeron	voice role
2013	Love Is in the Air	Julie	Alexandre Castagnetti	
2014	Lou! Journal infime	the mother	Julien Neel	
2014	Tristesse Club	Chloé	Vincent Mariette	
2015	Through the Air	Delphine Cavelle	Fred Grivois	
2018	Lola & Her Brothers	Lola Esnard	Jean-Paul Rouve	
2018	Rémi sans famille	Madame Barberin	Antoine Blossier	
2019	Fourmi	Chloé	Julien Rappeneau	
2019	Un monde plus grand	Louise	Fabienne Berthaud	
2019	The Truth	Anna	Hirokazu Kore-eda	
2019	La Forêt de mon père	Carole	Vero Cratzborn	
2021	Les Méchants	Virginie Arioule	Mouloud Achour, Dominique Baumard	
2021	The Hive	Alice	Christophe Hermans	
2021	Adieu Paris	Michael's daughter	Édouard Baer	
2023	Napoleon	Theresa Cabarrus	Ridley Scott	director's cut only
2024	And Their Children After Them	Hélène Casati	Ludovic and Zoran Boukherma	
2024	When Fall Is Coming	Valérie Tessier	François Ozon	Her fourth film with Ozon
2025	Mika ex Machina	herself	Deborah Saïag, Mika Tard	
Pending	Après		Kirill Serebrennikov	

=== Television ===
Year	Title	Role	Notes
1992	La famille Fontaine	Anne-Sophie	
1992	Vacances au purgatoire	Sophie	TV movie
1996	Le secret d'Iris	Mylène	TV movie
1998	Meurtres sans risque	Virginie Gallais	TV movie
1998	À nous deux la vie	Charlotte	TV movie
1998	Passion interdite	Estelle	TV movie
1999	Mission protection rapprochée	Melinda Moores	
2000	La banquise	Anna Kowalski	TV movie
2000	Des monstres a l'état pur	Ginnie	TV short
2002	Marie Marmaille	Marie	TV movie
2002	Napoléon	Hortense de Beauharnais	miniseries
2002	Navarro	Vanessa Berger	
2016	The Young Pope	Esther Aubry	miniseries
2020	The New Pope	Esther Aubry	miniseries
2021–present	Lupin	Claire Laurent	Netflix series
2022–2024	The Serpent Queen	Diane de Poitiers	Starz series
2024	Franklin	Anne Louise Brillon de Jouy	Apple TV+ miniseries

=== Theatre ===
Year	Title	Role	Author	Director	Notes
2022; 2024	Le Consentement	multiple	Vanessa Springora	Sébastien Davis	

== Awards and nominations ==
Year	Award	Category	Work	Result
1999	Acteurs à l'Écran awards	Best actress	Acide animé	Won
2002	Berlin International Film Festival	Outstanding artistic achievement (shared with ensemble cast)	8 Women	Won
2002	European Film Awards	Best Actress (shared with ensemble cast)	8 Women	Won
2002	Trophée Chopard	—N/a	—N/a	Won
2003	—N/a	Prix Romy Schneider	—N/a	Won
2003	César Awards	Most Promising Actress	8 Women	Nominated
2003	Boston Society of Film Critics Awards	Best Supporting Actress	Swimming Pool	Nominated
2003	Dallas–Fort Worth Film Critics Association Awards	Best Supporting Actress	Swimming Pool	Nominated
2003	Washington D.C. Area Film Critics Association Awards	Best Supporting Actress	Swimming Pool	Nominated
2003	European Film Awards	Best Actress	Swimming Pool	Nominated
2003	Hugo Awards	Silver Hugo Award for Best Actress	Little Lili	Nominated
2004	César Awards	Best Supporting Actress	Swimming Pool	Nominated
2004	Chlotrudis Awards	Best Supporting Actress	Swimming Pool	Nominated
2004	Visual Effects Society Awards	Outstanding Performance by a Male or Female Actor in an Effects Film	Peter Pan	Nominated
2008	Globes de Cristal Awards	Best Actress	Love Songs	Nominated
2008	César Awards	Best Supporting Actress	A Secret	Nominated
2008	Lumière Awards	Best Actress	A Girl Cut in Two	Nominated
2022	Kinéo Awards	Best Actress	Lupin	Won
2024	Molière Awards	Best solo show	Le Consentement	Nominated
