= Patrick Weil =

French political scientist (born 1956)

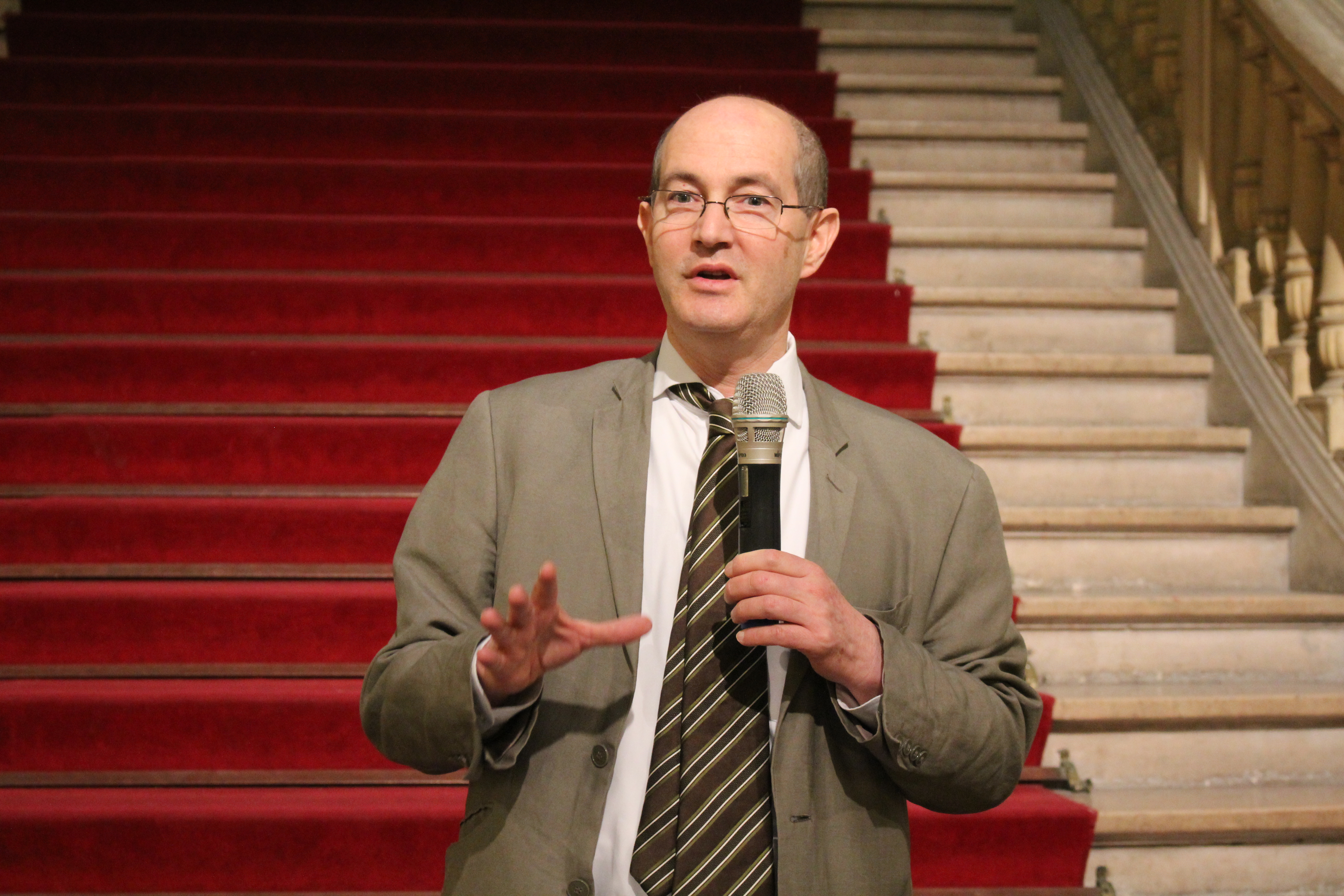
- Born: 14 October 1956 (age 69); Neuilly-sur-Seine, France
- Education: ESSEC Business School; Sciences Po
- Scientific career
- Fields: Political science

Patrick Weil (born 14 October 1956 in Neuilly sur Seine) is a political scientist. He is a senior research fellow at CNRS, at the Centre for the social history of the 20th century at the University of Paris 1. His research focuses on comparative citizenship, immigration law and constitutional law.

He received his master's degree in public law from ESSEC business school before obtaining his doctorate in political science. He worked as cabinet logistical head of the Secretariat of State for immigrants in 1981 and 1982, and was a member of the Stasi Commission and of the board of the Cité Nationale de l'Histoire de l'Immigration (Museum of the History of Immigration) - a position which, with seven others, he resigned on 18 May 2007, in protest against the creation of a ministry of immigration and national identity by Nicolas Sarkozy.

He is president of the non-governmental organisation Bibliothèques Sans Frontières (Libraries Without Borders).

He is currently a visiting professor of law and Oscar M. Ruebhausen Distinguished Senior Fellow and senior research scholar at Yale Law School in Connecticut, US.

Weil is the author of Le Sens de la République (Grasset 2016 with Nicolas Truong); The Sovereign Citizen: Denaturalization and the Origins of the American Republic (Univ of Penn Press, 2013); How to Be French: Nationality in the Making since 1789 (Duke Univ. Press 2008); Qu'est-ce qu'un Français? : Histoire de la nationalité française de la Révolution à nos jours (Grasset 2002)

In Le Monde in 2014, Weil wrote that Edward Snowden, an American whistleblower, was entitled "to obtain constitutional asylum, a specific French protection for "freedom fighters".

He was shortlisted for the 2023 Cundill History Prize for The Madman in the White House.

== Other ==
In 1992, he received the PhD prize of the National Assembly of France for his PhD work La France et ses étrangers.
