= Bibliothèques Sans Frontières =

French humanitarian NGO

Bibliothèques Sans Frontières/Libraries Without Borders
- Founded: 2007; 19 years ago Paris
- Founder: Patrick Weil
- Type: Non-profit; INGO
- Headquarters: Montreuil, France
- Location: France, Global
- Services: Providing access to information, education and culture
- Fields: Education, advocacy, human rights
- President, Chairman: Patrick Weil
- Key people: Patrick Weil, Jérémy Lachal, Dmitri Verboomen, Aaron Greenberg
- Website: www.librarieswithoutborders.org

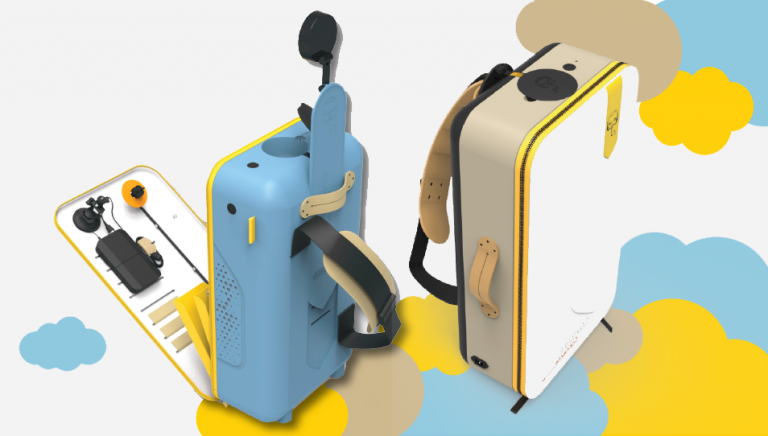
Le Cartable Connecté by Bibliothèques sans frontières

Bibliothèques Sans Frontières (BSF), known as Libraries Without Borders (LWB) in English, is a charitable organization based in Montreuil, France that provides access to information and education for refugees in humanitarian crises and under-resourced communities in the developed world. Founded in 2007, the organization distributes books, develops innovative technologies (including the Ideas Box), creates customized programs, and builds digital learning platforms in more than 50 countries. The U.S. branch, opened in 2008, is based in Washington, D.C., and listed as a non profit 501(c) organization under U.S. law. The organization received the Library of Congress' International Literacy Award in 2016.

== History ==
French historian Patrick Weil founded Bibliothèques Sans Frontières in January 2007 assisted by Jérémy Lachal. Its early focus was to strengthen and reinforce libraries by providing books and training for librarians. Following the 2010 earthquake in Haiti, BSF began to support culture and education during humanitarian emergencies.

In 2013, BSF partnered with Philippe Starck to design a kit that would make it easier to set up libraries in disaster zones and areas affected by conflict. Thus was born the Ideas Box, a mobile, pop-up library equipped with books, e-readers, tablets, laptops, cameras, a digital library and web-based educational content, including Wikipedia and Khan Academy videos. The Ideas Box breaks down into tables and chairs, and provides its own internet access and energy source. It has been used in a variety of contexts, including refugee and IDP camps, demobilization zones, underserved urban environments, rural areas, and anywhere that people are without access to information and learning resources.

== Objectives and Activities ==
Bibliothèques Sans Frontières' operations encompass three principal axes of intervention:

=== Humanitarian Aid and Peace-Building ===
The first intervention of Bibliothèques Sans Frontières in an emergency humanitarian context was during the natural catastrophes in Haiti in 2010. The principal objective of the organization's actions were to allow the communities made vulnerable by natural catastrophes to stay in contact with the rest of the world, to strengthen education, and to provide psycho-social support.

Following the Syrian crisis in 2012, BSF expanded its operations to support refugees in Germany, Italy, and Greece, as well as Jordan, Iraq, and Lebanon.

Moldova: Following the 2022 Russian invasion of Ukraine, BSF extended operations to the Republic of Moldova to support Ukrainian refugees and vulnerable local populations. In early 2023, BSF joined the STRIVE Consortium alongside NGOs Acted and IMPACT Initiatives. Funded by the AFD and USAID, the project focuses on the Anenii Noi district, transforming local libraries into "resilience hubs." These hubs utilize the Ideas Box to provide access to disaster risk reduction (DRR) information. By late 2023, the project had reached over 5,600 beneficiaries and trained more than 260 local mediators.

Lebanon: In 2021, BSF launched an educational and psychosocial initiative in partnership with the Amel Association International. Multimedia hubs, including Ideas Boxes and Ideas Cubes, were deployed in Haret Hreik, Khiam, and Kamed el-Loz to provide Lebanese residents and Syrian refugees with remedial education and vocational training. As of 2023, the partnership enagaged over 8,000 participants to mitigate local tensions and support social cohesion.

=== Education and Tools for Cultural Expression ===
BSF works globally to reduce inequality by providing access to cultural resources and information. Notable digital initiatives include the francophone adaptation of Khan Academy and the Karibu app, which assists refugees and migrants in learning French.

Burundi: In the Kavumu refugee camp, BSF deployed Ideas Boxes in partnership with the UNHCR to provide digital tools, books, and creative resources. The project focuses on helping refugees reconnect with the world and regain hope through education. Additionally, BSF collaborates with the Ministry of National Education to support teacher training using "Ideas Cubes."

Bangladesh: BSF supports the education of Rohingya refugees in the Kutupalong camp. To reinforce access to knowledge, the organization has installed nine Ideas Boxes and fifty Ideas Cubes. This project is supported by the French Ministry for Europe and Foreign Affairs, Acted, and Prantic.

=== Social Entrepreneurship ===
Bibliothèques Sans Frontières’ third and final axis of intervention concerns the social transformation of communities in structurally precarious situations and the development of social entrepreneurship. The goals of these interventions are to rethink libraries such that they become financially sustainable and socially meaningful (supporting shared values, proposing activities for communities in unfavorable conditions, etc.). Beyond that, BSF seeks to rethink the vision of the profession of librarian. The organization offers training for young librarians.

== Tools and Programs ==
To carry out its projects, Bibliothèques Sans Frontières uses different technologies, tools, and programs including the Ideas Box, the Ideas Cube, the Digital Traveller’s program, as well as Khan Academy.

=== The Ideas Box ===
The Ideas Box is a mobile, autonomous, and durable media center in a kit created in 2013 by BSF with the designer Philippe Starck and with the support of the United Nations High Commission for Refugees that provides educational and cultural resources, both physical and digital, to communities in need. The Ideas Box is used in humanitarian and post-conflict situations to provide information and education, and delivers access and resources to underserved communities in industrialized countries. To date, BSF has run 140 Ideas Box programs in 23 countries, with more than a million total visits.

The Ideas Box contains four modules, beginning with an administrative section that houses the network system (server, storage, and wi-fi signal) as well as an electrical system (battery, inverter). The second is includes e-readers, HD cameras, laptops, and more. The third module includes an HD TV and a projector. Included in this module are pedagogic tools such as documentaries or learning resources developed for each context, as well as films of all kinds for children and adults. Finally, the fourth module is a portable library with up to 300 books. These four modules come with stools and two tables.

BSF uses the Ideas Box in places touched by natural disasters or armed conflicts, including Burundi, but also among under-privileged and marginalized communities in the developed world. Adjusted to local languages, these tools permit individuals and communities to reconstruct themselves. BSF collaborates closely with on-the-ground operational partners who help select tailored content for each Ideas Box. After a period of one year, BSF turns over possession and operation of the Ideas Box to local organizations.

=== Kajou ===
In 2018, BSF created the social enterprise Kajou. It develops SD cards loaded with educational and cultural content that can be inserted into mobile phones, transforming them into libraries — no internet connection required. This initiative is aimed at populations with little or no internet access, primarily on the African continent.

=== Digital Travelers ===
Digital Travelers (Les Voyageurs du numérique) is a program that provides to children and adults free workshops on computer literacy. These workshops aim to raise awareness about digital issues and teach computer competency. Previously called Code Travelers (Voyageurs du code) and focused on programming, the Digital Travelers today adheres to the open source movement.

== Governance ==
=== President and Director General ===
Patrick Weil has been president of the association since its creation in 2007. Jérémy Lachal, the co-founder, was Secretary General until becoming Director General in February 2016.

=== Board of directors ===
The board of BSF has an executive and deliberative role. It meets several times a year. In France, the board is composed of 29 members: Patrick Weil, Olivier Bassuet, Peter Sahlins, Véronique Brachet, Lila Azam Zanganeh, Geneviève Brisac, Marie-Monique Steckel, Jean-Louis De Brouwer, Yves-André Istel, Katie Burke, Ghislaine Hudson, Eric Jozsef, Jean-Marie Lambert, Sandra Lagumina, Jean-Baptiste Soufron, Bertrand Commelin, Arielle Schwab, Florian Grisel, Julien Serignac, Constance Rivière, Florence De la Pradelle, Arnaud Delalande, Christian Connan, Mary Fleming, Thierry Marembert, Silvère Mercier, and Frédéric Régent. The 16 members of the US board include Patrick Weil, Antonio García Padilla, Gary Stewart, Eric Parrie, Peter Sahlins, Yves Istel, Marie-Monique Steckel, Tse-Sung Wu, Chelsea Stieber, Amber Koonce, Nate Hill, Owen Fiss, Nicholas C. E. Walter, Rebecca Duane, Sara McDougall and Brenlen Jenkins.

== National Member Associations of the BSF Network ==
=== France ===
The French association is the leader of the Bibliothèques Sans Frontières network, with its seat in Montreuil, and its book collection center at Épône in the Yvelines department. BSF France has regional offices in Marseille, Bordeaux, Lille, and Nancy. Internationally, BSF has offices in Burundi, Bogotá (Colombia), Amman (Jordan), and Erbil (Irak).

=== United States ===
The American association, Libraries Without Borders U.S., was established in 2008 and has its seat in Washington D.C. It runs programs in the U.S. and Puerto Rico for communities historically subject to discrimination, or experiencing acute educational, economic or social insecurity. Lovesun Parent is Executive Director of LWB US.

=== Belgium ===
The Belgian association, BSF Belge, founded in 2018, has its seat in Brussels. Its focus is on strengthening access to education, using Khan Academy videos in French and its own Digital Travellers program. Dimitri Verboomen is Director of BSF Belge.

== Finances ==
In 2024, BSF recorded a 15% growth in operating income, reaching a total of €14 million, as part of its Horizon 2030 strategic plan. Across the broader BSF system — from its social enterprises and national associations like BSF Belgium, BSF Italy, and LWB US — total resources reached €20.9 million. The growth of private resources (+44%) offset a contraction in public subsidies (-9%), reflecting BSF's ongoing financial diversification strategy. Subsidies remained the largest source of funding at 47%, followed by sponsorships and financial contributions at 33%, use of earmarked funds at 14%, donations at 4%, and other sources at 2%. Of funds disbursed, 86% went toward social projects, 8% to operating expenses, and 6% to fundraising. However, the year ended with a net deficit of €1.27 million, attributed to a 22% rise in expenses linked to higher direct project costs and investment in operational capacity; BSF maintained a solid financial structure nonetheless, with equity of €1.3 million and a financial debt-to-equity ratio below 20%.

== Advocacy Campaigns ==
=== Book Donation ===
Since 2007, BSF partners with the retailer FNAC in France to collect donated books and makes them available. The collected books are distributed to libraries in France or internationally or resold.

=== "Libraries: The Challenge for France" - 2017 ===
In the spring of 2017, BSF and the Association of French Libraries (Association de Bibliothèquaires en France, ABF) called on candidates for the legislative elections to commit to supporting libraries. Adhering to this charter, they promised to take measures to maintain and develop libraries if elected in their districts, to increase access and opening hours, to support the construction of libraries in zones where they were lacking, and to increase the allocated budgets of libraries including the hiring of qualified librarians. This communiqué included a petition signed by thousands of people including Éliette Abecassis, Christophe Deloire, Sara Yalda, Abd Al Malik, Geneviève Brisac, Laure Kermen-Lecuir, Valérie Lasserre Kiesow, Pierre Vesperini, Gérard Grunberg, Yerri Urban, Romain Dambre, Paul Egre, Nicole Caligaris, Vincent Chabault, Arnaud Delalande, Thomas Perroud, Laurent Joly, Ghislaine Hudson, Frédéric Barbier, Evelyne Bloch-Dano, Emmanuelle Saulnier-Cassia and Thomas Hochmann.

=== "The Urgency of Reading" - 2012 ===
The Urgency of Reading campaign sought to raise awareness, promote research, and change practices. This international appeal was opened to the public on 29 November 2012 and called for international organizations and states to consider a priority of humanitarian assistance the intellectual dimension of the human being in danger. The appeal was notably addressed to the Secretary-General of the United Nations, the Director-General of UNESCO, and the European Commission. The campaign opened an intense period of development and partnerships for BSF, and led to the development of new tools to diffuse learning and information in emergencies, including the Ideas Box.

== Honors and awards ==
Bibliothèques Sans Frontières/Libraries Without Borders has received the following awards and honors:

1. The Google Impact Challenge 2015
2. WISE Accelerator 2015
3. Ashoka Prize 2015
4. La France s'engage prize 2015
5. IDEAS Prize 2015
6. Grand Prize for Culture, Louis D. Foundation (2015)
7. The Library of Congress Literacy Award 2016
8. Clinton Global Initiative 2016
9. Open Education Consortium's Creative Innovation Award 2017
10. UNHCR's Humanitarian Education Accelerator 2017
11. Rodenberry Prize Fellowship 2019
