= Chiara Mastroianni =

French actress and singer (born 1972)

- Mastroianni during the 83rd Venice International Film Festival, September 2026
- Born: Chiara Françoise Charlotte Mastroianni; 28 May 1972 (age 54); Paris, France
- Occupations: Actress; singer
- Years active: 1993–present
- Spouse: Benjamin Biolay (m. 2002; div. 2005)
- Children: 2
- Parents: Marcello Mastroianni (father); Catherine Deneuve (mother)
- Relatives: Christian Vadim (half-brother); Maurice Dorléac (grandfather); Renée Simonot (grandmother); Ruggero Mastroianni (uncle); Françoise Dorléac (aunt)

Chiara Françoise Charlotte Mastroianni (born 28 May 1972) is a French-Italian actress and singer. She is the daughter of actors Marcello Mastroianni and Catherine Deneuve.

== Early life ==
Mastroianni was born to French actress Catherine Deneuve and Italian actor Marcello Mastroianni. Her parents were both married to other people at the time of their affair and stayed together for four years, separating in 1974, when Chiara was two years old. She later revealed that she could not recall them being together: "I've never seen my parents together, never in my whole life. They split when I was two, so I've no recollection of them as a couple. I've never even seen them kiss except in the movies."

Mastroianni has two half-siblings, a brother, Christian Vadim, from her mother's relationship with director Roger Vadim, and a sister, Barbara Mastroianni, from her father's marriage to actress Flora Carabella. Carabella is rumoured to have offered to adopt Mastroianni and raise her with her older sister as both her parents worked often and travelled from home, an offer Deneuve rejected.

Through her mother, Mastroianni is connected to the famous Dorléac family of actors, which includes her maternal grandparents, Maurice Dorléac and Renée Simonot, and her aunts, Françoise Dorléac (who died five years before Chiara was born) and Sylvie Dorléac.

== Career ==
Mastroianni earned a César Award nomination for her first feature film appearance in André Téchiné's My Favorite Season (1993), starring her mother in the lead role. The next year she played Kim Basinger's assistant in Prêt-à-Porter, directed by Robert Altman. Her first starring role came in 1995, opposite Melvil Poupaud in Le Journal du séducteur, a romantic comedy inspired by "The Seducer's Diary" chapter from Søren Kierkegaard's Either/Or. She worked with Poupaud again in Three Lives and Only One Death (1996), playing the daughter of her real-life father, and in Time Regained (1999), also starring her mother.

Along with a few supporting performances in French films, she appeared in Gregg Araki's Nowhere (1997) and took time off to have her first child with sculptor Pierre Thoretton. She returned to filmmaking to star in Manoel de Oliveira's The Letter (1999), based on Madame de La Fayette's novel La Princesse de Clèves.

After appearances in Mike Figgis's Hotel (2001) and Le parole di mio padre (2001), she played the lead in Delphine Gleize's interconnected drama Carnages (2002), a winner at several international film festivals. In 2003, she starred in the comedy drama Il est plus facile pour un chameau....

In July 2016, Mastroianni was named a member of the main competition jury for the 73rd Venice International Film Festival. In 2019 she won the Un Certain Regard Best Performance award for On a Magical Night.

In 2024, Mastroianni was appointed Jury member at the 2024 Tokyo International Film Festival for its section 'International competition'.

=== Collaborations ===
Mastroianni is a friend and frequent collaborator of French filmmaker Christophe Honoré. She has appeared in roughly half of his films in either major roles or cameos, beginning with the 2007 film Love Songs.

Before her father's death she appeared in two films with him, Prêt-à-Porter (1994) and Three Lives and Only One Death (1996).

Mastroianni also works frequently with her mother; they often play mother and daughter onscreen. Mastroianni first appeared in one of Deneuve's films in 1979 in an uncredited role in An Adventure for Two. Her second onscreen appearance also occurred in one of her mother's films, My Favorite Season (1993). Other notable films in which Mastroianni has acted opposite Deneuve include Persepolis, A Christmas Tale, Three Hearts and Claire Darling.

Mastroianni collaborated with her then-husband, musician Benjamin Biolay, on the album Home, released in 2004. She also appeared on the track ¡Encore Encore! on Biolay's 2017 album Volver.

== Personal life ==
Mastroianni dated actor Melvil Poupaud for four years from the age of 16 to 20. He encouraged her to pursue acting as a career and they have remained friends for decades, with Poupaud saying he still loved her in 2018.

On 31 December 1996, Mastroianni gave birth to a son, Milo Thoretton, whose father is sculptor Pierre Thoretton. In 2002, she married singer Benjamin Biolay. They had a daughter, Anna Biolay, on 22 April 2003, and divorced in 2005.

Mastroianni has also dated Edoardo Ponti (son of her father's frequent co-star Sophia Loren), François Cluzet, Benicio del Toro, Andrea Di Stefano, Vincent Lindon (who incidentally played her mother's love interest in Belle maman) and Benoît Poelvoorde.

== Filmography ==
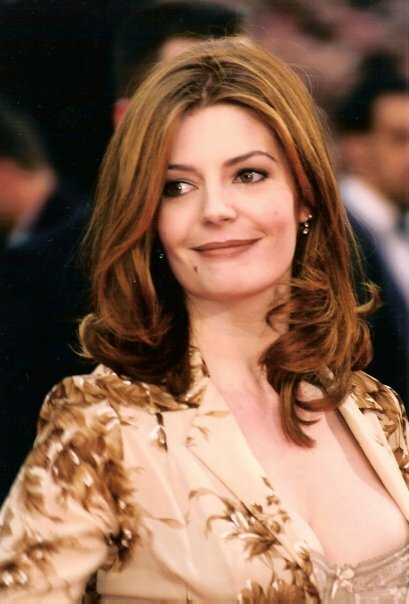
Mastroianni at the 1997 Cannes Film Festival

Year	Title	Role	Notes
1993	Ma saison préférée	Anne	Nominated – César Award for Most Promising Actress
1993	A la belle étoile	Claire	
1994	Prêt-à-Porter	Sophie Choiset	
1995	All Men are Mortal	Françoise	
1995	Le Journal du séducteur	Claire Conti	
1995	Don't Forget You're Going to Die	Claudia	
1996	Comment je me suis disputé... (ma vie sexuelle)	Patricia	
1996	Three Lives and Only One Death	Cécile	
1996	Cameleone	Léa	
1997	Nowhere	Kriss	
1998	On a très peu d'amis	Vivianne	
1998	À vendre	Mireille	
1999	Le temps retrouvé	Albertine	
1999	Libero Burro	Rosa Agnello	
1999	La Lettre	Madame de Clèves	
2000	Six-Pack	Marine	
2001	Hotel	Infirmière de l'hotel	
2001	Le parole di mio padre	Ada Malfenti	
2002	Carnages	Carlotta	
2003	Il est plus facile pour un chameau...	Bianca	
2005	Akoibon	Barbara	
2007	L'Heure zéro	Audrey Neuville	
2007	Persepolis	Marjane Satrapi (voice)	
2007	Les Chansons d'amour	Jeanne	
2008	A Christmas Tale	Silvia	
2008	La Belle Personne	La jeune femme dans le café	
2008	Le crime est notre affaire	Emma Charpentier	
2009	Un chat un chat	Nathalie/Célimène	
2009	Park Benches	Marianne's mother	
2009	Making Plans For Lena	Lena	
2010	Man at Bath	Actress	
2011	Chicken with Plums	Lili (adult)	
2011	Beloved	Véra Passer	Nominated – Lumière Award for Best Actress
2011	Americano	Claire	
2012	Lines of Wellington	Hussar	
2013	Bastards	Raphaëlle	
2014	La Rançon de la gloire	Rosa	
2014	Three Hearts	Sophie	
2016	Saint-Amour		
2018	La Dernière Folie de Claire Darling	Marie Darling	
2019	On a Magical Night	Maria Mortemart	Un Certain Regard – Best Actress; Nominated – César Award for Best Actress
2019	The Girl with a Bracelet	Céline Bataille	
2022	Other People's Children	Alice	
2022	Cet été-là	Louise	
2023	Eureka	El Coronel / Maya	
2024	Langue Étrangère		
2024	Marcello Mio	Herself / Marcello	
2026	One Minute to Midnight		

== Awards and nominations ==
Year	Award	Category	Nominated work	Result	Ref.
2019	Cannes Film Festival	Un Certain Regard Best Performance Prize	On a Magical Night	Won	
2020	César Awards	Best Actress	On a Magical Night	Nominated	
