= Making Plans for Lena =

- Directed by: Christophe Honoré
- Written by: Christophe Honoré; Geneviève Brisac
- Produced by: Pascal Caucheteux; Béatrice Mauduit
- Starring: Chiara Mastroianni; Marina Foïs; Marie-Christine Barrault; Jean-Marc Barr
- Cinematography: Laurent Brunet
- Edited by: Chantal Hymans
- Music by: Alex Beaupain; Emmanuel D'Orlando
- Production companies: Why Not Productions; France 3 Cinéma; Le Pacte
- Distributed by: Le Pacte
- Release date: 2 September 2009
- Running time: 105 minutes
- Country: France
- Language: French
- Budget: $3.8 million
- Box office: $6.1 million

Making Plans for Lena (French: Non ma fille, tu n'iras pas danser) is a 2009 French drama film directed by Christophe Honoré, who co-wrote the screenplay with Geneviève Brisac. It stars Chiara Mastroianni, Marina Foïs, Marie-Christine Barrault, and Jean-Marc Barr. It was released on 2 September 2009 in France.

== Plot ==
Lena, a single mother of two young children, takes a trip from Paris to Brittany to spend a holiday with her family at the country house. Lena's ex-husband Nigel and her love interest Simon visits them.

== Cast ==
- Chiara Mastroianni as Léna
- Marina Foïs as Frédérique
- Marie-Christine Barrault as Annie
- Jean-Marc Barr as Nigel
- Louis Garrel as Simon
- Fred Ulysse as Michel
- Marcial Di Fonzo Bo as Thibault
- Alice Butaud as Elise
- Julien Honoré as Gulven
- Donatien Suner as Anton
- Lou Pasquerault as Augustine
- Jean-Baptiste Fonck as José

== Release ==
The film was released on 2 September 2009 in France. It was also screened at the 2009 San Sebastián International Film Festival, the 2009 São Paulo International Film Festival, the 2010 San Francisco International Film Festival, and the 2010 Transilvania International Film Festival.

== Reception ==
At Rotten Tomatoes, the film holds an approval rating of 50% based on 8 reviews, and an average rating of 5.19/10.

Ed Gonzalez of Slant Magazine gave the film 2.5 out of 4 stars, writing: "With [André] Téchiné-like expertise, Honoré delicately weaves together the dramas of his characters' lives." He added: "Though those dramas aren't always interesting (one could even say the character of Frédérique is completely beside the point), Making Plans for Lena is a gorgeous tapestry nonetheless." Jordan Mintzer of Variety wrote: "While Love Songs and Dans Paris revealed prolific filmmaker Christophe Honore to be a direct descendant of the French New Wave, he heads straight into Arnaud Desplechin territory with the turbulent family drama Making Plans for Lena." Meanwhile, Frank Scheck of The Hollywood Reporter commented that "Mastroianni provides a vividly intense turn in the title role, but the film's narrative diffuseness and excessive stylization defeats her best efforts." He called it "a misstep from one of that country's most acclaimed filmmakers."

At the 35th César Awards, Alex Beaupain was nominated for the Best Original Music award.
