= Sirak M. Sabahat =

Israeli actor (born 1981)

- סירק סבהאט
- Born: Sirak M. Sabahat; December 5, 1981 (age 44); Wanita, Ethiopia
- Occupation: Actor
- Years active: 2005–present

Sirak M. Sabahat (Hebrew: סירק סבהאט; born December 5, 1981) is an Israeli actor. He is known for his role in the film Live and Become.

== Filmography ==
- Live and Become (2005)
- Comme au cinéma (2005)
- The Children of СССР (2007)
