= Beloved (2011 film) =

2011 film by Christophe Honoré

- Directed by: Christophe Honoré
- Written by: Christophe Honoré
- Starring: Chiara Mastroianni; Catherine Deneuve; Ludivine Sagnier; Louis Garrel; Radivoje Bukvic; Paul Schneider; Michel Delpech
- Cinematography: Rémy Chevrin
- Music by: Alex Beaupain
- Production companies: Why Not Productions; France 2 Cinéma; Sixteen Films; Negativ
- Distributed by: Le Pacte
- Release dates: 22 May 2011 (Cannes); 17 August 2011 (France)
- Running time: 139 minutes
- Country: France
- Language: French
- Budget: € 6.8 million

Beloved (French: Les Bien-aimés) is a 2011 French romantic drama film written and directed by Christophe Honoré, starring Chiara Mastroianni, Catherine Deneuve, Ludivine Sagnier, Louis Garrel, Rasha Bukvic, Paul Schneider, and Michel Delpech. The story is set in the 1960s through the 2000s in Paris, Reims, Montreal, Prague and London. While not a musical, the characters use musical 'narration' and 'dialogues' throughout the film.

== Plot ==
The film takes place in several periods which at times interweave.

In 1964, Madeleine is an assistant in a Parisian shoe-shop. As a result of a misunderstanding and to increase her income she becomes an occasional sex worker. She meets Jaromil, a young Czech doctor and falls in love. In 1968, they are living in Prague when Madeleine discovers that Jaromil is unfaithful; she returns to France with their daughter.

In 1978, Madeleine has married François, a member of the French Republican Guard, but Jaromil, passing through Paris convinces her to see him.

In 1997, Véra goes to London with her lover/friend Clément who is promoting his book. In a night-club she notices Henderson, an American. When they are alone he tells her that he is gay but both are attracted to each other. Meanwhile, Madeleine has been living in Reims with François, seeing Jaromil when he is in Paris. One afternoon Jaromil is hit in an accident and dies in hospital, upending the lives of Véra and Madeleine.

In 1998, Véra returns to London in search of Henderson. Véra is still very attracted to him but he reveals that he is HIV positive. Their relationship becomes impossible.

In 2001, Véra decides to see Henderson in New York City. The September 11 attacks divert her to Montréal. She tells him that she wants to have a child with him, and with medical help they can avoid HIV contamination of mother and child. After leaving him and his boyfriend in her room she takes his medicines and dies by suicide.

In 2007, Clément is persuaded by François to come to Reims for Madeleine's birthday. She is in a cycle of depression after the death of her first lover and her daughter. Together she and Clément go back to Paris and revisit her haunts from the 1960s.

== Cast ==
- Chiara Mastroianni as Véra
- Catherine Deneuve as Madeleine (older)
- Ludivine Sagnier as Madeleine (younger)
- Louis Garrel as Clément
- Rasha Bukvic as Jaromil (younger)
- Miloš Forman : Jaromil (older)
- Paul Schneider as Henderson
- Michel Delpech as François Gouriot (older)
- Guillaume Denaiffe : François Gouriot (younger)
- Dustin Segera Suarez : Mathieu
- Goldy Notay : Nandita
- Kenneth Collard : Adam
- Bonnie Duvauchelle : Véra as a child
- Fabrice Uhel : The young hospital doctor

== Production ==
The film is produced by Why Not Productions. The project received 228,000 euro in support from the Ile-de-France Regional Support Fund for Technical Film and Audiovisual Industries. Apart from the French investment, 20% of the 6.8-million-euro budget came from the United Kingdom and 10% from the Czech Republic. Filming started on 18 October 2010. As well as the songs by Alex Beaupain, the film opens with the French version of 'These Boots Are Made for Walkin'', and the string quartets of Janáček recur throughout the film.

== Release ==
The film had its world premiere as the closing film of the 2011 Cannes Film Festival on 22 May 2011. It was released in France through Le Pacte on 17 August 2011. It was also screened at the 2011 Toronto International Film Festival on 11 September 2011.

== Reception ==
At Rotten Tomatoes, the film holds an approval rating of 56% based on 45 reviews, and an average rating of 5.83/10. At Metacritic, which assigns a normalized rating to reviews, the film has a weighted average score of 55 out of 100, based on 17 critics, indicating "mixed or average reviews".

Peter Bradshaw of The Guardian gave the film 3 out of 5 stars, writing, "The movie is at its lightest, most charming and most persuasive in the 60s; as it approaches the present, something inescapably preposterous weighs it down, though Honoré carries it off with some flair." Sheri Linden of Los Angeles Times wrote, "In the central roles, real-life mother and daughter Catherine Deneuve and Chiara Mastroianni bring a chemical spark to the onscreen dynamics, and their compelling performances anchor the story's novelistic sprawl, especially when it falters or loses focus." She added, "The story lines are thin, but the melancholy that Honoré and his cast tap into is vibrant, particularly in Deneuve's portrayal of a woman who has embraced romantic daring and can observe her younger self without regret." Alison Willmore of The A.V. Club gave the film a grade of B, calling it "rambling, messy, but ultimately charming". Kirk Honeycutt of The Hollywood Reporter commented that "Location work everywhere is top notch and the smart decision was made not to turn this into a fashion parade through the decades but rather to go for a timeless look in the clothes, furniture and décor."
