= Christophe Honoré =

French writer and film director (born 1970)

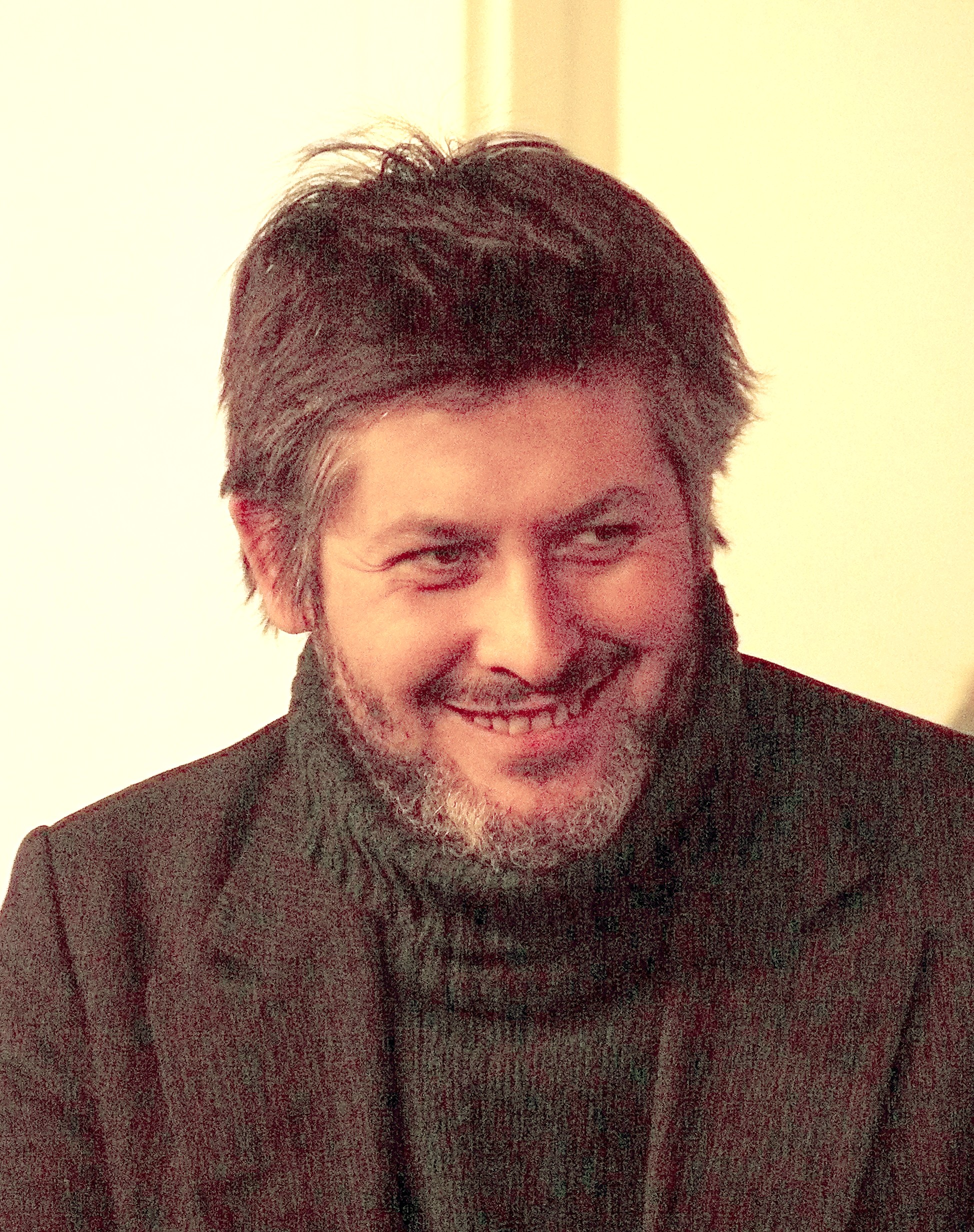
- Honoré in 2010
- Born: 10 April 1970 (age 56); Carhaix, Finistère, France
- Occupations: Film director, writer
- Years active: 2000–present

Christophe Honoré (French: [kʁistɔf ɔnɔʁe]; born 10 April 1970) is a French writer, filmmaker and theatre director.

== Career ==
Honoré was born in Carhaix, Finistère. After moving to Paris in 1995, he wrote articles in Les Cahiers du Cinéma. He started writing soon after. His 1996 book Tout contre Léo (Close to Leo) talks about HIV and is aimed at young adults; he made it into a film in 2002. He wrote other books for young adults throughout the late 1990s. His first play, Les Débutantes, was performed at Avignon's Off Festival in 1998. In 2005, he returned to Avignon to present Dionysos impuissant in the "In" Festival, with Joana Preiss and Louis Garrel playing the leads.

A well-known director, he is considered an "auteur" in French cinema. His 2006 film Dans Paris has led him to be considered by French critics as the heir to the Nouvelle Vague cinema. In 2007, Les Chansons d'amour was one of the films selected to be in competition at the 2007 Cannes Film Festival. Honoré is openly gay, and some of his movies or screenplays (among them Les Filles ne savent pas nager, Dix-sept fois Cécile Cassard and Les Chansons d'amour) deal with gay or lesbian relations. His film Plaire, aimer et courir vite (Sorry Angel), about a writer who has contracted HIV in the 1990s, won the Louis Delluc Prize for Best Film in 2018. Honoré has been the screenwriter for some of Gaël Morel's films. The actors Louis Garrel and Chiara Mastroianni have each had roles in several of his films.

Honoré has also directed several operas for the stage. For the Opéra de Lyon he directed Poulenc's Dialogues of the Carmelites in 2013, Debussy's Pelléas et Mélisande in 2015, and Verdi's Don Carlos in 2018. He also presented his production of Mozart's Così fan tutte at the Aix-en-Provence Festival and the Edinburgh Festival in 2016, and Puccini's Tosca at Aix-en-Provence in 2019; both of these productions adopted a radical approach to traditional works.

In the summer of 2020 Honoré's rehearsals of his stage production of Le Côté de Guermantes, based on the third volume of Proust's In Search of Lost Time, were interrupted by restrictions to combat the COVID-19 epidemic and it became impossible to present it at the Comédie-Française as planned. With his troupe of actors he decided to make a film about the production and the uncertainties they were now facing, and the film Guermantes was released in September 2021.

== Filmography ==
=== Feature films ===
Year	English title	Original title	Notes
2002	Seventeen Times Cecile Cassard	17 fois Cécile Cassard	
2002	Close to Leo	Tout contre Léo	TV Film
2004	Ma Mère		
2006	Dans Paris		
2007	Love Songs	Les Chansons d'amour	
2008	The Beautiful Person	La Belle Personne	
2009	Making Plans for Lena	Non ma fille tu n'iras pas danser	
2010	Man at Bath	Homme au bain	
2011	Beloved	Les Bien-aimés	
2014	Métamorphoses		
2016	Sophie's Misfortunes	Les Malheurs de Sophie	
2018	Sorry Angel	Plaire, aimer et courir vite	
2019	On a Magical Night	Chambre 212	
2021	Guermantes		
2022	Winter Boy	Le Lycéen	
2024	Marcello Mio		
2026	Orange-Flavoured Wedding	Mariage au goût d'orange	

=== Short films ===
Year	English title	Original title
2001	Nous deux	
2008	Hôtel Kuntz	
2019	30/30 Vision: 3 Decades of Strand Releasing (segment "Honoré")	

=== Only screenwriter ===
Year	English title	Original Title	Notes
2000	Girls Can't Swim	Les filles ne savent pas nager	Directed by Anne-Sophie Birot
2002	Novo		Directed by Jean-Pierre Limosin
2004	3 Dancing Slaves	Le Clan	Directed by Gaël Morel.
2007	After Him	Après lui	Directed by Gaël Morel.
2008	Sunny Spells	Le Bruit des gens autour	Directed by Diastème.
2011	Let My People Go!		Directed by Mikael Buch.
2015	Two Friends	Les Deux Amis	Directed by Louis Garrel.

== Novels ==
- 1995 : Tout contre Léo (jeunesse), turned into a film in 2002
- 1996 : C'est plus fort que moi (jeunesse)
- 1997 : Je joue très bien tout seul (jeunesse)
- 1997 : L'Affaire petit Marcel (jeunesse)
- 1997 : L’Infamille (Éditions de l'Olivier, ISBN 2-87929-143-7)
- 1998 : Zéro de lecture (jeunesse)
- 1998 : Une toute petite histoire d'amour (jeunesse)
- 1998 : Je ne suis pas une fille à papa (jeunesse)
- 1999 : Les Nuits où personne ne dort (jeunesse)
- 1999 : Mon cœur bouleversé (jeunesse)
- 1999 : Bretonneries (jeunesse)
- 1999 : La Douceur (Éditions de L'Olivier, ISBN 2-87929-236-0)

== Theatre and opera ==
=== Actor ===
- 1998: Les Débutantes
- 2001: Le Pire du troupeau
- 2004: Beautiful Guys
- 2005: Dionysos impuissant
- 2012: La Faculté
- 2012: Un jeune se tue
- 2012: Nouveau Roman
- 2015: Violentes femmes

=== Director ===
- 2009 : Angelo, Tyrant of Padua by Victor Hugo, Festival d'Avignon
- 2012 : Nouveau Roman, Festival d'Avignon, Théâtre national de la Colline
- 2013 : Dialogues of the Carmelites by Francis Poulenc, Opéra National de Lyon
- 2015 : Fin de l'Histoire by Witold Gombrowicz, Théâtre de Lorient
- 2015 : Pelléas et Mélisande by Claude Debussy, Opéra National de Lyon
- 2016 : Così fan tutte by Mozart, Aix-en-Provence Festival and Edinburgh International Festival
- 2018 : Don Carlos by Verdi, Opéra National de Lyon
- 2019 : Les Idoles by Christophe Honoré, Odéon-Théâtre de l'Europe
- 2019 : Tosca by Puccini, Aix-en-Provence Festival
