= François Perrot =

French actor (1924–2019)

- Born: 26 February 1924; Paris, France
- Died: 20 January 2019 (aged 94); Livry-Gargan, France
- Occupation: Actor
- Years active: 1951–2013

François Perrot (26 February 1924 – 20 January 2019) was a French film actor. He appeared in more than one hundred films from 1954 onwards.

== Theater ==
Year	Title	Author	Director
1951	Mother Courage and Her Children	Bertolt Brecht	Jean Vilar
1952	Le Joueur	Ugo Betti	André Barsacq
1953	Desire Under the Elms	Eugene O'Neill	Claude Sainval
1954	La Peur	Georges Soria	Tania Balachova
1954	The Mysteries of Paris	Eugène Sue	Georges Vitaly
1955	Un caso clinico	Dino Buzzati	Georges Vitaly
1955	Lady Windermere's Fan	Oscar Wilde	Marcelle Tassencourt
1956	Soledad	Colette Audry	François Perrot
1956	Requiem for a Nun	William Faulkner	Albert Camus
1958	Mourir au soleil	Jean Primo	Jean Primo
1959	Tête d'or	Paul Claudel	Jean-Louis Barrault
1959	Dix Ans ou dix minutes	Grisha Dabat	Jean Le Poulain
1959	Les Trois Chapeaux claque	Miguel Mihura	Olivier Hussenot
1960	Ana d'Eboli	Pierre Ordioni	Pierre Valde
1963	Diary of a Madman	Nikolai Gogol	François Perrot & Roger Coggio
1963	A Month in the Country	Ivan Turgenev	Pierre Valde
1963	Six Hommes en question	Frédéric Dard & Robert Hossein	Robert Hossein
1965	The Misanthrope	Molière	François Perrot
1972	Nous irons à Valparaiso	Marcel Achard	Jacques-Henri Duval
1973	Saint Joan	George Bernard Shaw	Pierre Franck
1973	Qu'est-ce-qui frappe ici si tôt ?	Philippe Madral	Philippe Adrien
1975	Maria	Isaac Babel	Bernard Sobel
1977	Adieu Supermac	Christopher Frank	Christopher Frank
1987	Les Seins de Lola	Maria Pacôme	Jean-Luc Moreau
1989	Le Dépôt des locomotives	Michel Diaz	Georges Vitaly
1992	Confidences pour clarinette	Michael Christofer	Jean-Luc Moreau
1993	Le Parfum de Jeanette	Françoise Dorner	Annick Blancheteau
1994	Finalement quoi	Philippe Madral	François Perrot
2003	Une jeunesse de passage	Stéphane Braka	Éric Le Hung

== Filmography ==
Year	Title	Role	Director	Notes
1954	The Women Couldn't Care Less	Langdon Burdell	Bernard Borderie	
1955	Vous pigez ?	Tony Martinelli	Pierre Chevalier	
1957	Les têtes interverties		Alejandro Jodorowsky	Short
1958	Montparnasse 19	The internal	Jacques Becker	Uncredited
1959	Les Liaisons dangereuses	A guest	Roger Vadim	Uncredited
1962	La dame aux camélias	Count of Giray	François Gir	TV movie
1962	Le joueur	Desgrieux	François Gir	TV movie
1962	Le bureau des mariages		Yannick Bellon	Short
1963	Commandant X	Leroux	Jean-Paul Carrère	TV series (1 episode)
1963	La rabouilleuse	Joseph Bridau	François Gir	TV movie
1963	Le jeu d'Elsenberg	The traveler	Edmond Tiborovsky	TV movie
1965	Evariste Galois	Master of arms	Alexandre Astruc	Short
1965	Goetz von Berlichingen	Weislingen	Jean-Paul Carrère	TV movie
1966	Gerfaut	Christian de Bergenheim	François Gir	TV series (1 episode)
1966	Le chevalier des Touches	Jacques	Claude-Jean Bonnardot	TV movie
1967	En votre âme et conscience		Claude Dagues	TV series (1 episode)
1968	La tempête	Antonio	François Gir	TV movie
1969	Le chandelier	Clavaroche	Odile Collet	TV movie
1969	Une soirée au bungalow	Lord Glenfallen	Lazare Iglesis	TV movie
1971	Nina Gipsy	Louis de Clameran	Claude-Jean Bonnardot	TV movie
1972	Les six hommes en question	Capitaine Roisel	Abder Isker	TV movie
1972	Joyeux chagrins	Maurice	François Gir	TV movie
1972	Les Cinq Dernières Minutes	Paul Garentoir	Claude Loursais	TV series (1 episode)
1973	L'alphomega		Lazare Iglesis	TV mini-series
1973	Le sourire vertical	Relde	Robert Lapoujade	
1973	L'inconnue de la Seine	Raymond Maillard	Olivier Ricard	TV movie
1973	Braises de décembre	The Count	Lazare Iglesis	TV movie
1974	Nada		Claude Chabrol	
1974	À dossiers ouverts	Mauzet	Claude Boissol	TV series (1 episode)
1974	Histoires insolites	M. Rosay	Claude Chabrol	TV series (1 episode)
1974	L'accusée	Laurent Mansigny	Pierre Goutas	TV series (1 episode)
1974	Messieurs les jurés	Doctor Schwartz	André Michel	TV series (1 episode)
1975	Innocents with Dirty Hands	Georges Thorent	Claude Chabrol	
1975	Marie-Antoinette		Guy Lefranc	TV mini-series
1976	Les roses de Manara	The Marquis	Jean Kerchbron	TV movie
1976	Le jeu du solitaire	Desmeserets	Jean-François Adam	
1976	Marie-poupée	Pierre	Joël Séria	
1976	Body of My Enemy	Raphaël Di Massa	Henri Verneuil	
1976	Cinéma 16	Jean-Paul Vauquier	Paul Seban	TV series (1 episode)
1976	Les Cinq Dernières Minutes	Marc Etivey	Claude Loursais	TV series (1 episode)
1977	Alice or the Last Escapade	The 40 year old man	Claude Chabrol	
1977	À chacun son enfer	The TV Director	André Cayatte	
1977	The French Woman	Lefevre	Just Jaeckin	
1977	The Old Country Where Rimbaud Died	Anne's husband	Jean Pierre Lefebvre	
1977	L'inspecteur mène l'enquête		Luc Godevais	TV series (1 episode)
1978	L'argent des autres	Vincent	Christian de Chalonge	
1978	Madame le juge	The substitute	Claude Barma, Édouard Molinaro, ...	TV series (6 episodes)
1978-1979	Brigade des mineurs	Henri	Peter Kassovitz & Michel Wyn	TV series (2 episodes)
1979	Fou comme François	Leroy	Gérard Chouchan	TV movie
1979	Le Maître-nageur	Maître Dalloz	Jean-Louis Trintignant	
1979	Je te tiens, tu me tiens par la barbichette		Jean Yanne	
1979	Womanlight	Alain	Costa-Gavras	
1979	Le journal	Roederer	Philippe Lefebvre	TV mini-series
1979	Les dames de la côte	Henri	Nina Companeez	TV mini-series
1979	La vie séparée		Peter Kassovitz	TV movie
1979	Cinéma 16	Leroy	Gérard Chouchan	TV series (1 episode)
1980	Caméra une première		Jacques Fansten	TV series (1 episode)
1980	Ras le coeur !	Blanzac	Daniel Colas	
1980	Les dossiers de l'écran	Laborie	Alain Dhénaut	TV series (1 episode)
1980	Le règlement intérieur	Mercier	Michel Vuillermet	
1980	Les amours des années folles	Spinder	Marion Sarraut	TV series (1 episode)
1980	Three Men to Kill	Etienne Germer	Jacques Deray	
1980	La traque	Judge Bresson	Philippe Lefebvre	TV movie
1980	Inspector Blunder	Louis Prossant	Claude Zidi	
1980	L'enfant dans le corridor	M. Grandcamp	Jacques Tréfouel	TV movie
1980	Arsène Lupin joue et perd	Major Patbury	Alexandre Astruc	TV mini-series
1980	Cinéma 16	Louis	Philippe Viard	TV series (1 episode)
1981	Une robe noire pour un tueur	The minister	José Giovanni	
1981	Messieurs les jurés	President of the court	Boramy Tioulong	TV series (1 episode)
1981	Noires sont les galaxies	Belloni	Daniel Moosmann	TV movie
1981	Seuls		Francis Reusser	
1981	Du blues dans la tête	The hotelier	Hervé Palud	
1981	Chambre 17	The unknown	Philippe Ducrest	TV movie
1981	Coup de Torchon	Colonel Tramichel	Bertrand Tavernier	
1981	Hotel America	Rudel	André Téchiné	
1981	Les fiancées de l'empire	Fouché	Jacques Doniol-Valcroze	TV mini-series
1982	Josepha	Marchand	Christopher Frank	
1982	Le Choc	Cox	Robin Davis	
1982	Pour cent briques, t'as plus rien...	The director	Édouard Molinaro	
1982	The Roaring Forties	TV Host	Christian de Chalonge	
1982	L'esprit de famille	Monsieur de Saint-Aimond	Roland Bernard	TV series (1 episode)
1982	Toutes griffes dehors	Monsieur Merlin	Michel Boisrond	TV mini-series
1982	Que les gros salaires lèvent le doigt !	Calot	Denys Granier-Deferre	
1982	The Year of the French	Barras	Michael Garvey	TV mini-series
1982	Cinéma 16	The editor	Pierre Boutron	TV series (1 episode)
1983	Quelques hommes de bonne volonté	Gurau	François Villiers	TV mini-series
1983	Banzaï	The boss of Mondial S.O.S.	Claude Zidi	
1983	La veuve rouge	The president of the court	Édouard Molinaro	TV movie
1983	Surprise Party	Armando	Roger Vadim	
1983	Sarah	A Belgian	Maurice Dugowson	
1983	Pablo est mort	Tomasi	Philippe Lefebvre	TV movie
1983	My Best Friend's Girl	The doctor	Bertrand Blier	
1983	My Other Husband	Nicolas	Georges Lautner	
1983	L'ami de Vincent	Janvion	Pierre Granier-Deferre	
1984	Les Morfalous	François Laroche-Fréon	Henri Verneuil	
1984	Disparitions	Marchandon	Daniel Moosmann	TV series (1 episode)
1984	Le vol du Sphinx	Staubli	Laurent Ferrier	
1985	Ça n'arrive qu'à moi	Batala	Francis Perrin	
1985	Châteauvallon	Georges Quentin	Paul Planchon, Serge Friedman, ...	TV series (10 episodes)
1985	Le génie du faux	Henrick Van Doorn	Stéphane Kurc	TV movie
1986	Music Hall	Monsieur André	Marcel Bluwal	TV movie
1986	Le débutant	Jean Rex	Daniel Janneau & Francis Perrin	
1986	Si t'as besoin de rien, fais-moi signe	Germain	Philippe Clair	
1986	Exploits of a Young Don Juan	The father	Gianfranco Mingozzi	
1986	Les étonnements d'un couple moderne	Roger Morane	Pierre Boutron	TV movie
1986	Ciboulette		Pierre Jourdan	TV movie
1987	Cinéma 16	Hanse	Pierre Boutron	TV series (1 episode)
1988	Les années sandwiches	Félix	Pierre Boutron	
1988	Les dossiers secrets de l'inspecteur Lavardin	Monsieur Legodard	Claude Chabrol	TV series (1 episode)
1988	Haute tension	Lamiel	Patrick Dromgoole	TV series (1 episode)
1989	Marie Pervenche	Trublime	Claude Boissol	TV series (2 episodes)
1989	Les seins de Lola	Julien	Pierre Badel	TV movie
1989	Le masque	Basil Willing	Pascal Goethals	TV series (1 episode)
1989	Life and Nothing But	Capitaine Perrin	Bertrand Tavernier	Nominated - César Award for Best Supporting Actor
1989	Les enquêtes du commissaire Maigret	La Pommeraye	Jean-Paul Sassy	TV series (1 episode)
1990	Les Cinq Dernières Minutes	Zeller	Stéphane Kurc	TV series (1 episode)
1990	Faux et usage de faux	Daniel Laumière	Laurent Heynemann	
1990-1991	Eurocops		Franck Apprederis	TV series (2 episodes)
1991	Poison d'amour	Blondeau	Hugues de Laugardière	TV movie
1991	Napoléon et l'Europe		Krzysztof Zanussi	TV series (1 episode)
1991	Merci la vie	Maurice	Bertrand Blier	
1991	Lola Zipper	Henri Berman	Ilan Duran Cohen	
1991	Sentiments	Gaspard	Maurice Dugowson	TV series (1 episode)
1991	Les clés du paradis	Boileau	Philippe de Broca	
1991	C'est quoi ce petit boulot ?	Luccini	Michel Berny & Gian Luigi Polidoro	TV mini-series
1992	La Belle Histoire	Marie's uncle	Claude Lelouch	
1992	Who Wants to Kill Sara?	Gomez	Gianpaolo Tescari	
1992	Stranger in the House	Commissioner Binet	Georges Lautner	
1992	À demain	Bouddha	Didier Martiny	
1993	Le château des oliviers	Doctor Samuel	Nicolas Gessner	TV mini-series
1993	Le juge est une femme	Alain Buisson	Serge Leroy	TV series (1 episode)
1994	Maigret	Professor Gouin	Joyce Buñuel	TV series (1 episode)
1994	Les faussaires	Bizien	Frédéric Blum	
1995	Les Milles	Colonel Maurice Charvet	Sébastien Grall	
1995	Chercheur d'héritiers	Vincent Ravanel	Laurent Heynemann	TV series (1 episode)
1996	La rançon du chien	Edouard Raynaud	Peter Kassovitz	TV movie
1996	Le Jaguar	Matelako	Francis Veber	
1997	L'histoire du samedi	Etienne Martineau	Dominique Baron	TV series (1 episode)
1997	Une femme en blanc	Maxime de Montpensy	Aline Issermann	TV mini-series
1997	Mauvais genre	Victor Hugo	Laurent Bénégui	
1998	La clef des champs	Bontemps	Charles Nemes	TV mini-series
1998	Louise et les marchés	Roger Garrel	Marc Rivière	TV mini-series
1999	In punta di cuore	Papy Fernard	Francesco Massaro	TV movie
1999	Une journée de merde !	Devèze	Miguel Courtois	
1999	La rivale	Dom Ascaride	Alain Nahum	TV movie
1999	One 4 All	The producer	Claude Lelouch	
2000	Marie et Tom	Pierre Gendreau	Dominique Baron	TV movie
2000	Le coeur à l'ouvrage	Ronald	Laurent Dussaux	
2000	Les faux-fuyants	The Count	Pierre Boutron	TV movie
2001	Mon père, il m'a sauvé la vie	Santos	José Giovanni	
2002	Boss of Bosses	Antoine Delorme	Stéphane Kappes	TV series (1 episode)
2002	Un impossible amour	André	Michaëla Watteaux	TV movie
2003	La maison des enfants	Montpensy	Aline Issermann	TV mini-series
2003	I'm Staying!	J.C.	Diane Kurys	
2004	La bonté d'Alice	Edouard Nerval	Daniel Janneau	TV movie
2004	Les Cordier, juge et flic	Marcigny	Gilles Béhat	TV series (1 episode)
2007	La prophétie d'Avignon	Louis Esperanza	David Delrieux	TV mini-series
2008	A Man and His Dog	Albert	Francis Huster	
2011	Avant l'aube	Paul Couvreur	Raphaël Jacoulot	
2013	The French Minister	Antoine Taillard	Bertrand Tavernier	(final film role)
