= The Extraordinary Adventures of Adèle Blanc-Sec =

Comic book series by Jaques Tardi

- The front cover of the original, 1976 edition of the first album, Adèle et la Bête. It shows Adèle, the eponymous heroine, and the pterodactyl on the rooftops of Paris.

Publication information
- Publisher: Casterman
- Schedule: Varied
- Formats: Original material for the series has been published in the newspaper Sud-Ouest in 1976, the comics anthologies BD #28–39 and (À suivre) #29–33, 76–81, 199–201 and the magazine Télérama #2998–3006.
- Original language: French
- Genre: Action/adventure, historical fantasy, mystery, science fantasy
- Publication date: 1976 – present

Creative team
- Writer(s): Jacques Tardi
- Penciller(s): Jacques Tardi
- Inker(s): Anne Delobel (1976–78); Jacques Tardi (1980–98); Jean-Luc Ruault (2007)
- Colorist(s): Anne Delobel (1976–78); Jacques Tardi (1980–98); Jean-Luc Ruault (2007)

Reprints
- The series has been reprinted, at least in part, in English.
- Collected editions
- "Pterror Over Paris" and "The Eiffel Tower Demon": ISBN 978-1-60699-382-8
- "The Mad Scientist" and "Mummies on Parade": ISBN 978-1-60699-493-1

The Extraordinary Adventures of Adèle Blanc-Sec (French: Les Aventures extraordinaires d'Adèle Blanc-Sec) is a gaslamp fantasy comic book series first appearing in 1976 written and illustrated by French comics artist Jacques Tardi and published in album format by Belgian publisher Casterman, sometimes preceded by serialisation in various periodicals, intermittently since then. The comic portrays the titular far-fetched adventures and mystery-solving of its eponymous heroine, herself a writer of popular fiction, in a secret history-infused, gaslamp fantasy version of the early 20th century, set primarily in Paris and prominently incorporating real-life locations and events. Initially a light-hearted parody of such fiction of the period, it takes on a darker tone as it moves into the post–World War I years and the 1920s.

One of Tardi's most popular works and his first to span multiple albums, it has been reprinted in English and other translations and has been adapted as a feature film.

== History ==
Adèle Blanc-Sec takes place in the same fictional universe as three earlier Tardi comics: Adieu Brindavoine ("Farewell Brindavoine"), serialised in 1972 in the Franco-Belgian comics magazine Pilote #680–700, its direct sequel La Fleur au fusil ("The Flower in the Rifle"), a ten-page one-shot first published in 1974 in Pilote No. 743 and included in albums of the former, and the 1974 original graphic novel The Arctic Marauder (Le Démon des glaces, "The Demon of the Ice"). It is, however, the more technology-focused, what might now be called steampunk, Arctic Marauder that takes place first in the fictional continuity, being set in the 1890s, with Lucien Brindavoine's adventures, considered a less refined, early prototype for Adèle's, occurring during the World War I hiatus in Adèle's story line.

Adèle itself came about as a consequence of a commission from Casterman for a multi-album series, something Tardi had not been particularly interested in pursuing of his own accord at the time but took them up on the offer. A survey of popular series demonstrated an abundance of strong male protagonists but women in the lead role represented only by, on the one hand, the ingenuous Bécassine and, on the other, the primarily sexual Barbarella; thus, he sought to differentiate his series by centring it on a heroine every bit the equal of these other comics' heroes. Contradictorily, however, and in particular contrast to Forest's Barbarella, he was also to set the series in the 1910s of Maurice Leblanc's Arsène Lupin, when her independence would be even more extraordinary. And so he created... Edith Rabatjoie (meaning Killjoy) and, subsequently, Adèle Blanc-Sec (her family name coming from wine terminology, meaning "dry white") as an adversary for her. But upon the originally villainous Blanc-Sec coming into the comic he found he enjoyed drawing her far more than Rabatjoie and so she became the protagonist and title character, while ever since retaining something of a Lupin-esque moral dubiousness and disregard for the law. Her green coat, as well as complementing her red hair, is in ironic reference to the green dress of Bécassine, whom she is partly conceived as an antithesis of. The comic first appeared in the daily newspaper Sud-Ouest in 1976, with the pages in colour on Sundays and black and white on others, prior to album publication in colour throughout by Casterman and later in their (À suivre).

== Plot ==
The adventures, set in Paris in the years before and after World War I, revolve around the protagonist Adèle Blanc-Sec. A cynical heroine, she is initially a novelist of popular fiction, who turns to investigative journalism as her research and subsequent adventures reveal further details of the mystical world of crime. Themes of the occult, corruption, official incompetence, and the dangers of patriotism suffuse the series.

One interesting feature is the hiatus which separates Adèle's first exploits, taking place in 1910s Paris, from later ones, instead set in the interwar milieu. The separation is explained with her having been cryogenically hibernated following a grave injury. The expedient was deemed necessary by Tardi to avoid her entanglement in World War I. In an interview he declared: "Her feisty nature made it impossible to provide her with a place in the war. She would not have been allowed to fight, and could no more have settled for being a nurse, than she could have remained home rolling bandages."

== Albums ==
As of November 2022, all ten of the projected ten albums have been published in French and two different English translations have been published, the first covering only the first five and the latter currently ongoing, with the aim of releasing all ten in omnibus editions of two albums each.

#	French title	Serialised	Album published	Dark Horse/NBM title	Fantagraphics title
01	"Adèle et la bête"	1976 in Sud-Ouest	1976	"Adèle and the Beast"	"Pterror Over Paris" and "The Eiffel Tower Demon"
02	"Le Démon de la tour Eiffel"	Not serialised	1976	"The Demon of the Eiffel Tower"	"Pterror Over Paris" and "The Eiffel Tower Demon"
03	"Le Savant fou"	Not serialised	April 1977	"The Mad Scientist" and "Mummies on Parade"	"The Mad Scientist" and "Mummies on Parade"
04	"Momies en folie"	April–June 1978 in BD #28–39	September 1978	"The Mad Scientist" and "Mummies on Parade"	"The Mad Scientist" and "Mummies on Parade"
05	"Le Secret de la salamandre"	June–October 1980 in (À suivre) #29–33	April 1981	"The Secret of the Salamander"	"The Secret of the Salamander" and "The Two-headed Dwarf"
06	"Le Noyé à deux têtes"	May–October 1984 in (À suivre) #76–81	September 1985		"The Secret of the Salamander" and "The Two-headed Dwarf"
07	"Tous des monstres !"	August–October 1994 in (À suivre) #199–201	October 1994		TBA
08	"Le Mystère des profondeurs"	Not serialised	October 1998		TBA
09	"Le Labyrinthe infernal"	June–August 2007 in Télérama #2998–3006	October 2007		TBA
10	"Le Bébé des Buttes-Chaumont"	TBA	October 2022		TBA

=== Translations ===
The first five stories were translated by Randy and Jean-Marc Lofficier. They were published, as The Most Extraordinary Adventures of Adèle Blanc-Sec, first by Dark Horse Comics in their Cheval Noir title and then released in book form by NBM Publishing (1990–92).

1. Adèle and the Beast (June 1990, ISBN 0-918348-85-4)
2. The Demon of the Eiffel Tower (1990, ISBN 1-56163-001-2)
3. The Mad Scientist and Mummies on Parade (1996, ISBN 1-56163-156-6)
4. The Secret of the Salamander (1992)

Fantagraphics Books have signed a deal with Tardi to translate and release his work and series editor and translator Kim Thompson stated, before his demise, that the Adèle Blanc-Sec books will be translated but it is not his highest priority:

First, I wanted to start out with something fresh and previously unseen in the US (which is why I put [It Was the] War of the Trenches third instead of first), and the first couple of Adele books have been published here. You can still find them on Amazon. Second, there is what I call the popularity paradox, which is that sometimes the most popular French work is the hardest to sell as compared to the "art" comics because the more mainstream work loses some of its "alternative" audience without replacing it with a "mainstream" audience. So Adele, with its playful Euro adventure tropes, is in some ways less accessible to American readers than, say, Trenches. […] That said, Adele is on my long-term list, but I've got at least three or four more books beyond the first three I'd like to do first.

The Fantagraphics titles are:

1. Pterror Over Paris and The Eiffel Tower Demon (96 pp., hardcover, 2010, ISBN 1-60699-382-8)
2. The Mad Scientist and Mummies on Parade (96 pp., hardcover, 2011, ISBN 1-60699-493-X)
3. The Secret of the Salamander and The Two-headed Dwarf (96 pp., hardcover, TBP 2014)

In 2026, Fantagraphics began reissuing the series in larger hardcover format, beginning with the first four albums in one volume:

1. The Extraordinary Adventures of Adèle Blanc-Sec Vol. 1 (196 pp., hardcover, July 2026, ISBN 979-8875002380)

== Adaptations into other media ==
A live action feature film adapted and directed by Luc Besson, The Extraordinary Adventures of Adèle Blanc-Sec was released in France on 14 April 2010 and latterly in numerous other markets, including the United Kingdom.
