= Jean-Patrick Manchette =

French crime novelist (1942–1995)

- Born: December 19, 1942; Marseille, France
- Died: June 3, 1995 (aged 52); Paris, France
- Education: University of Paris
- Writing career
- Genre: Crime fiction

Jean-Patrick Manchette (19 December 1942 – 3 June 1995) was a French crime novelist credited with reinventing and reinvigorating the genre. He wrote ten short novels in the seventies and early eighties, and is widely recognized as the foremost French crime fiction author of that period. His stories are violent explorations of the human condition and French society. Manchette was politically to the left and his writing reflects this through his analysis of social positions and culture.

Nine of his eleven novels have been translated into English. Two were published by San Francisco publisher City Lights Books—3 To Kill (from the French Le petit bleu de la côte ouest) and The Prone Gunman (from the French La Position du tireur couché). Seven other novels, Fatale, The Mad and the Bad (from the French O dingos, O chateaux!), Ivory Pearl (from the French La Princesse du Sang), Nada, No Room at the Morgue, The N'Gustro Affair, and Skeletons in the Closet were released by New York Review Books Classics in 2011, 2014, 2018, 2019, 2020, 2021, and 2023 respectively. In 2009, Fantagraphics Books released an English-language version of French cartoonist Jacques Tardi's adaptation of Le petit bleu de la côte ouest, under the new English title West Coast Blues. Fantagraphics released a second Tardi adaptation, of The Prone Gunman (under the title Like a Sniper Lining Up His Shot) in 2011, and a third one, of "Ô Dingos! Ô Châteaux!" (under the title "Run Like Crazy Run Like Hell") in 2015. Manchette was a fan of comics, and his praised translation of Alan Moore's Watchmen into French remains in print.

== Youth and early writings ==
Born 19 December 1942, in Marseille, where the war had temporarily led his parents, Jean-Patrick Manchette spent most of his early years in Malakoff, in Paris's southern suburbs. Growing up in a relatively modest family (his father started out as a factory worker, later to become an electronics sales executive), he was an excellent pupil and from an early age showed keen interest in writing. During his childhood and adolescence, he wrote hundreds of pages of pastiches of war memoirs and science fiction novels, gradually turning to attempts at "serious" fiction.

A compulsive reader, passionate lover of American film and jazz (he played the tenor and alto saxophone), he also developed a lifelong interest in chess and other strategy games. While his parents envisioned a teaching career for him, to their great dismay he dropped out of the ENS without graduating, and decided to try and earn a living writing. He went to England to teach French for one semester in a college for the blind at Worcester, then returned to France.

A left-wing activist during the War of Algeria in the early 1960s, he was at that time very much influenced by the writings of the Situationist International.

His first goal was to become a screenwriter. To achieve this, in 1965 he began a series of diverse menial writing jobs: scripts for short films, various treatments, and two low-budget films for director Max Pecas (Woman beleaguered / The Prisoner of Desire and Fear and Love). In 1968, he first encountered success writing scripts and dialogue for 11 episodes of the popular TV series The Globetrotters. Concurrently, he wrote novelizations of several films (Mourir d'aimer, Sacco and Vanzetti), novels derived from episodes of The Globetrotters, fiction for kids, espionage novels, and even an erotic novel, all under pen names. Alone or with his wife Melissa, he also translated two dozen English-language novels, mostly by Robert Littell, crime fiction and books about film, including memoirs of Pola Negri and biographies of Humphrey Bogart and The Marx Brothers.

These jobs, while barely earning him a living, kept him away from the screenwriting work he was aiming for. Turning to novels then appeared to be the next step, as he figured once his novels were in print, studios might be interested in turning them into film. He thus envisioned writing his first novel as a path toward writing for film.

== Major novels ==
Manchette chose to write noir fiction as he already had great love for the genre and admired the "behaviorist" style of Dashiell Hammett. He sent out his first novel, L'Affaire N'Gustro (The N'Gustro Affair) to a mainstream publisher at the end of 1969. While working on a second one with a fellow writer, he was advised to take it to famous crime fiction imprint Série Noire at Éditions Gallimard. There, his novel elicited much interest and was accepted. Nine of Manchette's eleven novels were published by the Série Noire.

In 1971 his first two novels were released, Laissez bronzer les Cadavres (Corpses in the sun), written with Jean-Pierre Bastid, and L'Affaire N'Gustro (The N'Gustro Affair). These novels marked the kickoff of the movement Manchette himself later on called the "neo-polar," a radical departure in crime fiction from the formulaic French cops-and-robbers novels of the 1950s and '60s. Here, Manchette used the crime thriller as a springboard for social criticism. This trend was clearly exemplified by L'Affaire N'Gustro, which was directly inspired by the 1965 Paris abduction of Ben Barka, leader of the Moroccan left-wing opposition, by Moroccan intelligence with the covert help of French secret services.

In 1972, Manchette published O dingos, O chateaux! (Run like Crazy Run like Hell), in which a fragile young woman and a boy, the nephew of a billionaire, are chased by a psychopathic killer and his henchmen. This chase punctuated by sudden outbursts of violence is also another opportunity for him to criticize contemporary social woes. The novel went on to win the French Grand Prix of crime fiction for the year 1973.

1972 saw Manchette releasing Nada, an examination of the kidnapping of a U.S. ambassador by a small group of left-wing activists, and the ensuing takedown of that group by the police.

After an unusual take on the western genre, L'Homme au Boulet rouge (The Red Ball Gang) derived from an unfilmed screenplay by American screenwriter B.J. Sussman, Manchette then wrote two novels using the character of private eye Eugene Tarpon, Morgue pleine (Crowded day at the Morgue) and Que d'os! (It's raining bones!). Tarpon is a French private detective, a former cop responsible for the death of a protester, eaten up by grief, with a wry and weary outlook on the world, who gets mixed up in very tangled cases à la Raymond Chandler, another of Manchette's favorite writers.

In 1976 came "Le Petit Bleu de la Côte Ouest" (3 to Kill / West Coast Blues). In this novel, Georges Gerfaut, an ordinary corporate executive, witnesses a murder, and unwittingly becomes a target for the killers. He abruptly leaves his family and his oh-so-perfect life for a while, before returning to the fold once his brutal adventure has ended. Brimming with references to West Coast jazz and full of memorable set pieces, this novel is a landmark in Manchette's output.

Next came Fatale, the story of Aimée Joubert, a female killer-for-hire who shatters the apparent quietness of a small seaside town with devastating results. The book was rejected by the Série Noire as too literary and released as a mainstream novel. Manchette qualified this as an "experimental novel" more than a thriller.

In 1981, he wrote The Prone Gunman (La Position du tireur couché), based on a classic Noir theme. Martin Terrier, a young hitman eager to retire, becomes a victim of the world he lives in. His attempted return to his home town ends up in mayhem, and his glamorous image is destroyed as he loses the woman he loves, the money he saved, the one friend he has left, and finally, his marksmanship. The novel has been translated from French into English by poet and editor, James Brook, and was published by City Lights Publishers in 2002 (ISBN 9780872864023). "The Prone Gunman" was named "Top Mystery Book of 2002" by the New York Times Book Review. In 2015, the novel was made into a film called The Gunman, directed by Pierre Morel, starring Sean Penn, Javier Bardem and Peter Franzen.

In the following years, while being regularly named by the press as the father of the neo-polar, Manchette no longer published novels, but kept writing for film and television, translating novels and writing articles on the detective novel and on film. He believed he had gone full circle with his last novel, which he conceived as a "closure" of his Noir fiction. Manchette explained in a 1988 letter to a journalist:

" After that, as I did not have to belong to any kind of literary school, I entered a very different work area. In seven years, I have not done anything good. I'm still working at it."

In 1989, finally having found new territory he wanted to explore, Manchette started writing a new novel, La Princesse du Sang (Ivory Pearl), an international thriller, which was supposed to be the first book in a new cycle, a series of novels covering five decades from the post-war period to present times. He died from cancer before completing it. He died in Paris.

Starting in 1996, a year after his death, several unpublished works were released, showing how very active he was in the years preceding his death.

== Film and miscellaneous other writings ==
From 1973 on, Manchette constantly wrote for the screen. Among his filmwork are Nada (1974), directed by Claude Chabrol and adapted from his own novel, L'Agression (The Assault) (Gerard Pires, 1974), L'Ordinateur des pompes funèbres (The Probability Factor) (Gerard Pires, 1976), The Police War (Robin Davis, 1979), Légitime Violence (Serge Leroy, 1982), and La Crime (Philippe Labro, 1983). In addition, several of his novels were made into movies, three of which starring Alain Delon, but after Nada, Manchette chose not to work on these adaptations, in order to avoid having to change his own stories. His love of film writing and great sense of dialogue, however, led him to contribute to many film projects, often adapted from other crime novelists (William Irish, Hillary Waugh, Wade Miller, etc.). And he worked on a great many projects which never materialized. He also occasionally wrote for television, such as the TV drama Série noire in the 1980s.

Manchette firmly believed translation to be noble work and he kept doing it throughout his life. Between 1970 and 1995, he translated thirty novels, including books by Donald E. Westlake, Robert Bloch, Ross Thomas and the graphic novel Watchmen. He also wrote a comic album Griffu for cartoonist Jacques Tardi, a couple of children's books, wrote prefaces, notes on books, essays and drama. In addition to his novels and his work for the movies, Manchette also kept a daily diary from 1965 to 1995, which ultimately runs for over five thousand handwritten pages.

Among his many other activities, at various times in his life, Manchette was also the editor of a line of science fiction novels (1976-1981), wrote a column on mind games (1977-1979) under the pen name General-Baron Staff, served as editor of a weekly comics magazine (1979-1980), and was a film critic and columnist on crime fiction (1977-1981) under the pen name Shuto Headline. With his essays on Noir fiction (1982-1983 and 1992–1995), he proved himself one of the major theorists of genre literature.

== Posthumous releases ==
After his death, from 1996 on, came out his last unfinished novel, Princesse du Sang (Blood Princess), as well as collections of his articles on Noir fiction, crime fiction and the detective novel, Chroniques (Chronicles), his articles about film, Les Yeux de la Momie (The Mummy's Eyes) and his only theatrical play, Cache ta joie! (Hide your happiness!), chapters from abandoned novels like Iris, an unpublished screenplay, Mishaps and decomposition of the Dance of Death Company and a volume of his diaries, Journal covering the years 1966 to 1974. These releases have confirmed Manchette's influence on the French literary scene. His novels are currently enjoying renewed interest and have now been translated into a great many languages worldwide.

== Bibliography ==
=== Novels ===
- Laissez bronzer les Cadavres / Let the Corpses Tan - co-authored by Jean-Pierre Bastid (1971)
- L'Affaire N'Gustro / The N'Gustro Affair (1971) - English translation by Donald Nicholson-Smith
- O dingos, O chateaux! / The Mad and the Bad / Run Like Crazy, Run Like Hell (1972) - English translation by Donald Nicholson-Smith
- Nada (1973) - English translation by Donald Nicholson-Smith
- L'Homme au Boulet rouge / The Red Ball Gang (1972)
- Morgue pleine / No Room at the Morgue (1973) - English translation by Alyson Waters
- Que d'os! / Skeletons in the Closet (1976) - English translation by Alyson Waters
- Le Petit Bleu de la Côte Ouest / 3 to Kill / West Coast Blues (1976) - English translation by Donald Nicholson-Smith
- Fatale (1977) - English translation by Donald Nicholson-Smith
- The Prone Gunman / La Position du tireur couché (1981) - English translation by James Brook
- La Princesse du Sang / Ivory Pearl (1996) - English translation by Donald Nicholson-Smith

=== Other writings ===
- Chroniques (1996)
- Les Yeux de la Momie: chroniques de cinéma (1997)
- Cache ta joie! (1999)
- Journal: 1966-1974 (2008)
- Lettres du mauvais temps: Correspondance 1977-1995 (2020)

=== Comics ===
- Griffu (1978) - art by Jacques Tardi, written by Manchette - English translation by Frank Wynne
- Fatale (1980, unfinished) - by Jacques Tardi, based on the novel by Manchette - English translation by Jenna Allen
- West Coast Blues (2005) - by Jacques Tardi, based on the novel by Manchette - English translation by Jenna Allen
- Like a Sniper Lining Up His Shot (2010) - by Jacques Tardi, based on the novel by Manchette - English translation by Kim Thompson
- Run Like Crazy, Run Like Hell (2011) - by Jacques Tardi, based on the novel by Manchette - English translation by Doug Headline
- Ivory Pearl (2011) - by Max Cabanes and Doug Headline, based on the novel by Manchette - English translation by Doug Headline
- Fatale (2015) - by Max Cabanes and Doug Headline, based on the novel by Manchette - English translation by Edward Gauvin
- Nada (2018) - by Max Cabanes and Doug Headline, based on the novel by Manchette
- Morgue Pleine (2021) - by Max Cabanes and Doug Headline, based on the novel by Manchette

== Filmography ==
- Nada, directed by Claude Chabrol (1974, based on Nada)
- Folle à tuer, directed by Yves Boisset (1975, based on O dingos, O chateaux!)
- Three Men to Kill, directed by Jacques Deray (1980, based on Le Petit Bleu de la Côte Ouest)
- For a Cop's Hide, directed by Alain Delon (1981, based on Que d'os!)
- Le Choc, directed by Robin Davis (1982, based on La Position du Tireur Couché)
- Polar, directed by Jacques Bral (1984, based on Morgue pleine)
- The Gunman, directed by Pierre Morel (2015, based on La Position du Tireur Couché)
- Let the Corpses Tan, directed by Hélène Cattet and Bruno Forzani (2017, based on Laissez bronzer les cadavres)

=== Screenwriter ===
- 1975: L'Agression (dir. Gérard Pirès)
- 1976: L'Ordinateur des pompes funèbres (dir. Gérard Pirès)
- 1979: The Police War (dir. Robin Davis)
- 1982: Légitime Violence (dir. Serge Leroy)
- 1983: La Crime (dir. Philippe Labro)

== Sources ==
- Novels by Jean-Patrick Manchette on Gallimard publishers website
- Benoît Mouchart, Manchette, le nouveau roman noir, éditions Séguier-Archimbaud, 2006 ISBN 2-84049-495-7 (in French)
- Temps noir N° 11, May 2008 (ISBN 978-2-910686-49-9) special issue entirely devoted to Jean-Patrick Manchette (in French).
