= Alain Terzian =

French-Armenian film producer

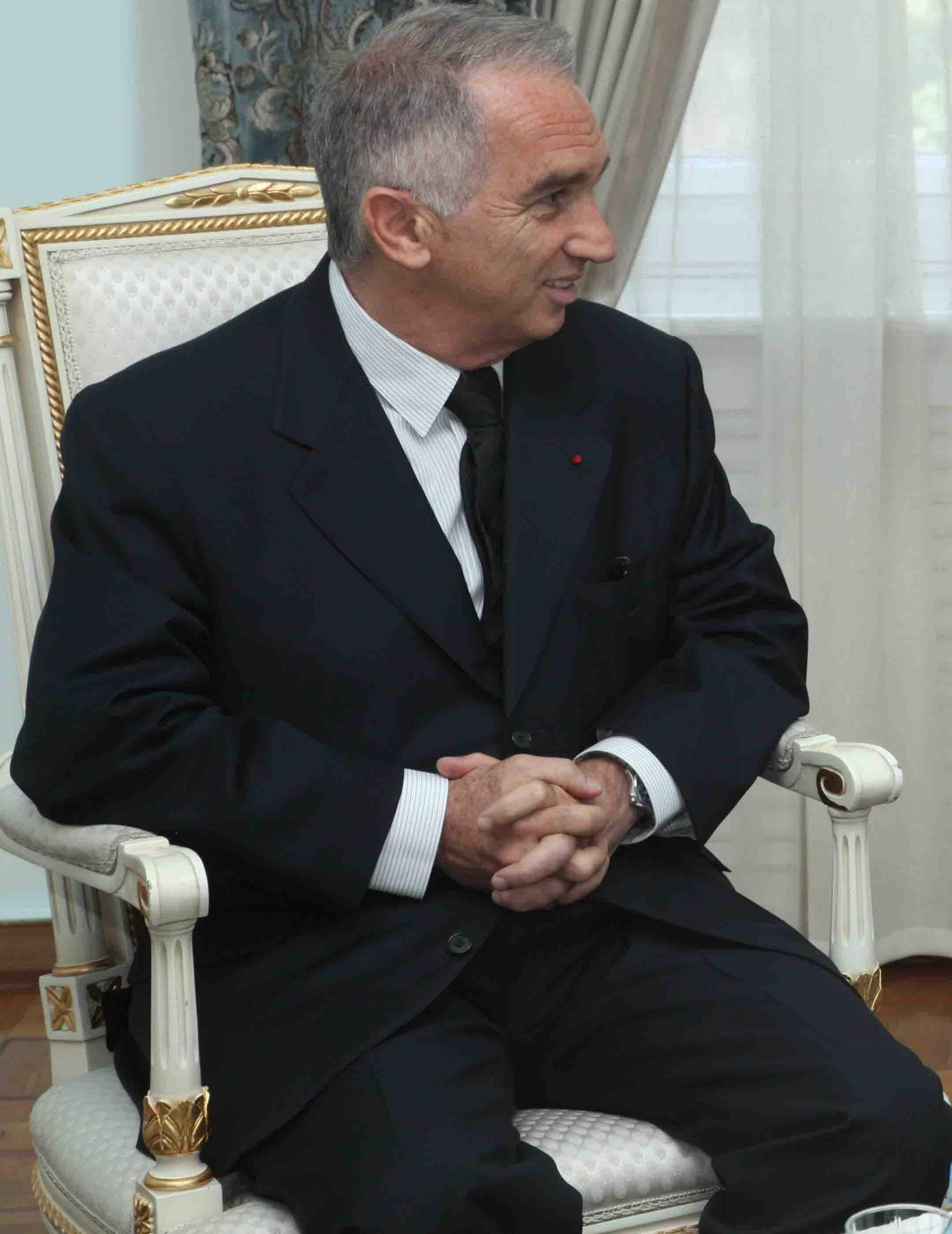
- Born: 2 May 1949 (age 77); Paris, France
- Occupation: Film producer
- Years active: 1975–present

Alain Terzian (born 2 May 1949) is a French-Armenian film producer, Administrator of Cannes Film Festival jury, and former President of Académie des Arts et Techniques du Cinéma. He is the chief executive officer of Alter Films and the President of Union of French Producers, UPF.

On 12 March 2009, among with Charles Aznavour, André Santini and Hélène Ségara he attended the opening ceremony of the Yerevan Park in the center of Paris.

== Leadership of the Académie des Arts et Techniques du Cinéma ==
In 2003, he was elected President of Académie des Arts et Techniques du Cinéma, a position from which he resigned in 2020 when the collective resignation of the Academy's board of directors led to a profound restructuring of the institution.

Terzian was involved in a dispute in January 2020. A dinner was held to announce the nominees for the 45th César Awards, inviting various actors and staff of nominated films. Invitees were allowed to bring along another figure involved with the film industry with them. Two attendees submitted requests, one for director Claire Denis and the other for writer Virginie Despentes; both are known as feminists. The Academy's leadership rejected Denis and Despentes and refused to allow them at the ceremony. An open letter signed by over 400 figures in the French film industry criticized the "arbitrary, even discriminatory manner" in which these two attendees were rejected, with no reason given, and criticized Terzian directly over the matter as the one who was behind the decision.

== Filmography ==
Year	Title	Director	Notes
1975	Vanda Teres	Jean-Marie Vincent	
1978	Les ringards	Robert Pouret	
1979	Laura	David Hamilton	
1979	The Medic	Pierre Granier-Deferre	
1979	Les Charlots en délire	Alain Basnier	
1980	Three Men to Kill	Jacques Deray	
1981	La revanche	Pierre Lary	
1981	Pétrole! Pétrole!	Christian Gion	
1982	Le Choc	Robin Davis	
1982	L'indiscrétion	Pierre Lary	
1982	Boulevard des assassins	Boramy Tioulong	
1982	Que les gros salaires lèvent le doigt!	Denys Granier-Deferre	
1983	Le jeune marié	Bernard Stora	
1983	Premiers désirs	David Hamilton	
1984	La smala	Jean-Loup Hubert	
1984	Year of the Jellyfish	Christopher Frank	
1984	Femmes de personne	Christopher Frank	
1984	Rive droite, rive gauche	Philippe Labro	
1985	Rendez-vous	André Téchiné	Nominated - Palme d'Or
1985	L'homme aux yeux d'argent	Pierre Granier-Deferre	
1986	La gitane	Philippe de Broca	
1986	Le débutant	Daniel Janneau & Francis Perrin	
1986	Scene of the Crime	André Téchiné	Nominated - Palme d'Or
1987	Spirale	Christopher Frank	
1987	Les Innocents	André Téchiné	Nominated - César Award for Best Film
1987	Vent de panique	Bernard Stora	
1987	Club de rencontres	Michel Lang	
1988	La passerelle	Jean-Claude Sussfeld	
1988	Bonjour l'angoisse	Pierre Tchernia	
1991	Les clés du paradis	Philippe de Broca	
1991	L'Opération Corned-Beef	Jean-Marie Poiré	
1993	Fanfan	Alexandre Jardin	
1993	Les Visiteurs	Jean-Marie Poiré	Nominated - César Award for Best Film
1995	Les Anges gardiens	Jean-Marie Poiré	
1996	Ma femme me quitte	Didier Kaminka	
1997	Héroïnes	Gérard Krawczyk	
1997	Les Soeurs Soleil	Jeannot Szwarc	
1998	The Visitors II: The Corridors of Time	Jean-Marie Poiré	
1999	Tout baigne!	Eric Civanyan	
2000	Le prof	Alexandre Jardin	
2003	I'm Staying!	Diane Kurys	
2005	Anthony Zimmer	Jérôme Salle	
2006	Président	Lionel Delplanque	
2006	Le passager de l'été	Florence Moncorgé-Gabin	
2009	Le coach	Olivier Doran	
2009	Change of Plans	Danièle Thompson	
2009	Le Premier Cercle	Laurent Tuel	
2011	Requiem pour une tueuse	Jérôme Le Gris	
2013	Hôtel Normandy	Charles Nemes	
2015	Chic!	Jérôme Cornuau	
2015	Premiers crus	Jérôme Le Gris	
2016	Cézanne and I	Danièle Thompson	
2017	Les ex	Maurice Barthélemy	
2020	Chacun chez soi	Michèle Laroque	

== Awards ==
- Officer of Légion d'honneur
- Chevalier of Ordre d'honneur (Armenia) (2009)
- Officer of Ordre national du Mérite
- Chevalier of Ordre des Arts et des Lettres
