= Le Choc =

- Theatrical release poster
- Directed by: Robin Davis
- Screenplay by: Robin Davis; Alain Delon; Dominique Robelet; Claude Veillot
- Based on: The Prone Gunman by Jean-Patrick Manchette
- Produced by: Alain Sarde; Alain Terzian
- Starring: Alain Delon; Catherine Deneuve
- Cinematography: Pierre-William Glenn
- Music by: Philippe Sarde
- Distributed by: UGC Distribution
- Release date: 28 April 1982
- Running time: 100 minutes
- Country: France
- Language: French
- Box office: 11.3 million

Le Choc (lit. 'The Shock') is a 1982 French crime thriller film directed by Robin Davis and starring Alain Delon, Catherine Deneuve, and Philippe Léotard. Based on the novel The Prone Gunman (La position du tireur couché) by Jean-Patrick Manchette, the film is about a hitman who wants to retire from his life in organized crime and flees to the country where he meets and falls in love with a beautiful woman.

== Plot ==
Martin Terrier (Alain Delon) wants to quit his job as a hired hitman, but his organized crime employers are unwilling to see him turned out to pasture, Terrier knows too much, and he is still useful to the organization. He escapes to the countryside where he meets Claire (Catherine Deneuve), and the two soon fall in love. Back in Paris to confront his employers, Terrier learns that they've stolen all his money from the bank. They give him an ultimatum—do one last job for them and he gets his money and his freedom.

== Cast ==
- Alain Delon as Martin Terrier / Christian
- Catherine Deneuve as Claire
- Philippe Léotard as Félix
- Étienne Chicot as Michel
- François Perrot as Cox
- Stéphane Audran as Jeanne Faulques
- Féodor Atkine as Borévitch, aka "Boro"
- Catherine Leprince as Mathilde
- Jean-Louis Richard as Maubert
- Franck-Olivier Bonnet as Silvio
- Dany Kogan as Rosana
- Myriam Pisacane as The Blue Angel
- Isabelle Mergault as The bank employee

== See also ==
- The Gunman (2015 film), an American-French-Spanish action thriller film based on the 1981 novel The Prone Gunman
