= Caroline Cellier =

French actress (1945–2020)

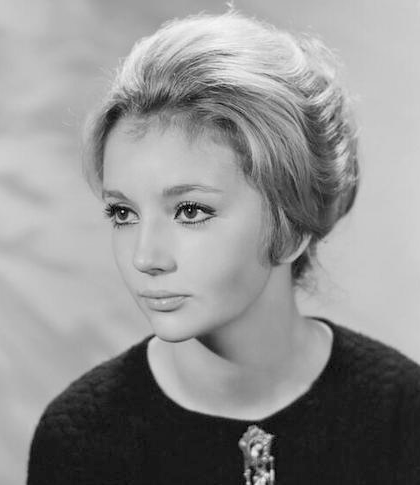
- Caroline Cellier studio picture 1965
- Born: Monique Marie Louise Cellier; 7 August 1945; Montpellier, France
- Died: 15 December 2020 (aged 75); Paris, France
- Occupation: Actress
- Years active: 1964–2011
- Spouse: Jean Poiret (1978–1992)
- Children: 1

Caroline Cellier (7 August 1945 – 15 December 2020) was a French actress. She appeared in such films as L'année des méduses (Year of the Jellyfish), La vie, l'amour, la mort, and Le Plaisir (et ses petits tracas).

== Personal life ==
Caroline Cellier was born in August the 7th of the year 1945 in Montpellier, France. When she was eighteen she attended the Cours Simon in Paris for 1 year before starting her career. She married the actor Jean Poiret. Their son Nicolas became a screenwriter and actor. The couple stayed together until Jean's death in March 1992.

== Theatre ==
Year	Title	Author	Director	Notes
1963	You Never Can Tell	George Bernard Shaw	René Dupuy	
1964	Les Fausses Confidences	Pierre de Marivaux	René Dupuy	
1965	Du vent dans les branches de sassafras	René de Obaldia	René Dupuy	
1966	Das Käthchen von Heilbronn	Heinrich von Kleist	Jean Anouilh & Roland Piétri	
1967	Pygmalion	George Bernard Shaw	Pierre Franck	
1967	Chaud et froid	Fernand Crommelynck	Pierre Franck	
1969	The Misanthrope	Molière	Jean Meyer	
1969	La Fille de Stockholm	Alfonso Leto	Pierre Franck	
1970	Pourquoi m'avez-vous posée sur le palier?	Catherine Peter Scott	Jean-Pierre Grenier	
1971	Le Ciel de lit	Jan de Hartog	Jacques Charon	
1972	L'Ouvre-boîte	Félicien Marceau	Pierre Franck	
1979	The Taming of the Shrew	William Shakespeare	Jacques Weber	
1980	L'Aide-mémoire	Jean-Claude Carrière	Yves Bureau	
1982	Betrayal	Harold Pinter	Raymond Gérôme	
1983	Le Bonheur à Romorantin	Jean-Claude Brisville	Andreas Voutsinas	
1985	L'âge de monsieur est avancé	Pierre Étaix	Jean Poiret	
1988	Les Liaisons dangereuses	Pierre Choderlos de Laclos	Gérard Vergez	
1999	A Streetcar Named Desire	Tennessee Williams	Philippe Adrien	Nominated - Molière Award for Best Actress
2003	Lady Windermere's Fan	Oscar Wilde	Tilly	

== Filmography ==
Year	Title	Role	Director	Notes
1964	Une fille dans la montagne	Félicie	Roger Leenhardt	TV movie
1964	La mégère apprivoisée	Bianca	Pierre Badel	TV movie
1965	La tête du client	Evelyne Berrien	Jacques Poitrenaud	
1965	Marie Curie - Une certaine jeune fille		Pierre Badel	TV movie
1966	La morale de l'histoire	Sophie	Claude Dagues	TV movie
1966	Au théâtre ce soir	Anita	Pierre Sabbagh	TV series (1 episode)
1966	Rouletabille	Odette	Robert Mazoyer	TV series (1 episode)
1966	Les dossiers de Jérôme Randax	Lise de Vilmot	Jean-Paul Carrère	TV series (1 episode)
1967	La guerre de Troie n'aura pas lieu	Hélène	Marcel Cravenne	TV movie
1967	Au théâtre ce soir	Aline	Pierre Sabbagh	TV series (1 episode)
1969	Life Love Death	Caroline	Claude Lelouch	
1969	This Man Must Die	Hélène Lanson	Claude Chabrol	
1971	The Most Gentle Confessions	Catherine	Édouard Molinaro	
1971	Romulus le grand		Marcel Cravenne	TV movie
1972	La mort d'un champion		Abder Isker	TV movie
1973	L'emmerdeur	Louise Pignon	Édouard Molinaro	
1973	Molière pour rire et pour pleurer	Armande	Marcel Camus	TV mini-series
1974	Mariage	The young girl	Claude Lelouch	
1974	Le ciel de lit	Agnès	Jeannette Hubert	TV movie
1974	Soirée Courteline	Her	Jeannette Hubert	TV movie
1974	Histoires insolites	Caroline	Claude Chabrol	TV series (1 episode)
1976	Le cheval évanoui	Coralie	Alain Dhénaut	TV movie
1977	The Blue Ferns	Betty	Françoise Sagan	
1977	Une femme, un jour...	Caroline Puyssessau	Léonard Keigel	
1980	Certaines nouvelles	Françoise	Jacques Davila	
1980	Le vol d'Icare	Adeline	Daniel Ceccaldi	TV movie
1980	Cinéma 16	Isabelle	Philippe Viard	TV series (1 episode)
1981	Les héroïques	Claire	Joël Santoni	TV movie
1981	L'atterrissage	Agnès	Eric Le Hung	TV movie
1982	A Thousand Billion Dollars	Hélène Kerjean	Henri Verneuil	
1983	Surprise Party	Lisa Bourget	Roger Vadim	
1984	Year of the Jellyfish	Claude	Christopher Frank	César Award for Best Supporting Actress
1984	P'tit Con	Annie Choupon	Gérard Lauzier	
1984	Femmes de personne	Isabelle	Christopher Frank	
1984	Le bonheur à Romorantin	Agnès	Alain Dhénaut	TV movie
1985	Chicken with Vinegar	Anna Foscarie	Claude Chabrol	
1986	Danger Passion	Lola	Philippe Triboit	TV movie
1987	Poker	Hélène	Catherine Corsini	
1987	Grand Guignol	Sarah	Jean Marboeuf	
1987	Charlie Dingo	Georgia Wolski	Gilles Béhat	
1987	Vent de panique	Martine	Bernard Stora	
1990	Julie de Carneilhan	Julie de Carneilhan	Christopher Frank	TV movie
1991	La contre-allée	Lilas	Isabel Sebastian	
1992	Le zèbre	Camille	Jean Poiret	Nominated - César Award for Best Actress
1992	Fantômes en héritage	Diana	Juan Luis Buñuel	TV mini-series
1994	Farinelli	Margareth Hunter	Gérard Corbiau	
1994	Délit mineur	Claire	Francis Girod	
1996	Men, Women: A User's Manual	Madame Blanc	Claude Lelouch	
1996	L'élève	Emma	Olivier Schatzky	
1997	Didier	Annabelle	Alain Chabat	
1997	La disgrâce	Elise Martineau	Dominique Baron	TV movie
1998	Le plaisir (et ses petits tracas)	Hélène	Nicolas Boukhrief	
1998	Les grands enfants	Catherine	Denys Granier-Deferre	TV movie
2004	Transit		Julien Leclercq	Short
2005	Un jeu dangereux	Camille Davenne	Patrick Dewolf	TV movie
2006	Jean-Philippe	Caroline	Laurent Tuel	
2007	Fragile(s)	Hélène	Martin Valente	
2010	Thelma, Louise et Chantal	Gabrielle	Benoît Pétré	
2011	Le grand restaurant II	A client	Gérard Pullicino	TV movie
