= The Prone Gunman =

Book by Jean-Patrick Manchette

- 1998 Folio cover
- Author: Jean-Patrick Manchette
- Original title: La Position du tireur couché
- Language: French
- Publisher: Éditions Gallimard
- Publication date: 1981
- Publication place: Paris
- Media type: Print
- Pages: 183

The Prone Gunman (French: La Position du tireur couché) is a thriller novel written by Jean-Patrick Manchette, published in 1981 in the Série noire collection of éditions Gallimard. It was translated into English by James Brook, and first published by City Lights in 2002.

In 2010, illustrator Jacques Tardi produced an illustrated adaptation of the book. The novel also inspired the name for a musical group from Clermont-Ferrand.

== Adaptations ==
=== In film ===
- Le Choc – French film directed by Robin Davis and starring Alain Delon, Catherine Deneuve and Philippe Leotard
- The Gunman – American-French-Spanish film directed by Pierre Morel and starring Sean Penn, Idris Elba and Javier Bardem.

=== Comics ===
- La Position du tireur couché – adaptation and drawings Jacques Tardi, from the novel by Jean-Patrick Manchette, Futuropolis 2010, ISBN 9782754804295
  - Like a Sniper Lining Up His Shot – adaptation and drawings Jacques Tardi, from the novel by Jean-Patrick Manchette, Fantagraphics Books 2011, ISBN 9781606994481
- Tardi, Jacques; Manchette, Jean-Patrick (9 November 2010). La position du tireur couché. Futuropolis. ISBN 978-2-7548-0934-4.
