= Nestor Burma =

- Guy Marchand as Nestor Burma
- Created by: Léo Malet
- Portrayed by: René Dary; Daniel Sorano; Michel Galabru; Michel Serrault; Gérard Desarthe; Guy Marchand

In-universe information
- Gender: Male
- Occupation: Private detective
- Nationality: French

Nestor Burma is a fictional character created by French crime novelist Léo Malet.

== Overview ==
In the Burma series, one can isolate a subset of novels each set in a different quarter (arrondissement) of Paris which Malet dubbed the "New Mysteries of Paris", alluding to Eugene Sue's The Mysteries of Paris (1842–43). Burma is a hardboiled private detective, in the mold of American characters such as Sam Spade and Philip Marlowe but decidedly more humorous. He works with a secretary, Hélène, who is hopelessly infatuated with Nestor, in what he calls the "Fiat Lux Agency". Burma's nemeses are typically just as much the police investigating the crime as they are the original perpetrators. Specifically, he often matches wits with Commissaire Faroux and Inspector Fabre.

== Adaptations ==
The novels have been adapted numerous times, most notably as a television series starring Guy Marchand, which began in 1991.

=== List of Adaptations ===
- 120, rue de la Gare, directed by Jacques Daniel-Norman (1946), with René Dary
- La Nuit d'Austerlitz, directed by Stellio Lorenzi (TV film, 1954), with Daniel Sorano
- La Nuit de Saint-Germain-des-Prés, directed by Bob Swaim (1977), with Michel Galabru
- Nestor Burma, détective de choc, directed by Jean-Luc Miesch (1982), with Michel Serrault and Jane Birkin
- Les Rats de Montsouris, directed by Maurice Frydland (TV film, 1988), with Gérard Desarthe
- Nestor Burma (TV series, 39 episodes, 1991–2003), with Guy Marchand

== Select titles ==
- 120, rue de la Gare (1943)
- Le cinquième procédé (The Fifth Process) (1948)
- Le soleil naît derrière le Louvre (The Sun Rises Behind the Louvre) (1954)
- Des kilomètres de linceuls (Kilometers of Shrouds) (1955)
- Fièvre au Marais (Marais Fever) (1955)
- La nuit de Saint-Germain-des-Prés (The night of Saint-Germain-des-Prés) (1955)
- M'as-tu vu en cadavre? (Have you seen me as a corpse?) (1956)
- Brouillard au pont de Tolbiac (Fog at the Tolbiac Bridge) (1956)
- Casse-pipe à la Nation (1957)
- Micmac moche au Boul' Mich' (1957)
- Nestor Burma court la poupée (1971)

== Other media ==
A series of graphic novels by artist Jacques Tardi have also been published to great critical acclaim. The third in this series was an original story by Tardi.
