= The Children Thief =

1991 film

- Directed by: Christian de Chalonge
- Written by: Christian de Chalonge; Dominique Garnier; Jules Supervielle
- Produced by: Luis Méndez
- Starring: Marcello Mastroianni
- Cinematography: Bernard Zitzermann
- Edited by: Anita Fernández
- Music by: Luis Llach
- Distributed by: Les Films Ariane
- Release date: 25 September 1991
- Running time: 110 minutes
- Country: France
- Language: French

The Children Thief (French: Le Voleur d'enfants) is a 1991 French drama film directed by Christian de Chalonge.

== Cast ==
- Marcello Mastroianni - Bigua
- Ángela Molina - Desposoria
- Michel Piccoli - M. Armand
- Nada Strancar - Rose
- Cécile Pallas - Mère d'Antoine
- Virginie Ledoyen - Gabrielle
- Loïc Even - Joseph
- Caspar Salmon - Antoine
- Benjamin Doat - Benjamin
- Nicolas Carré - Nicolas
- Adrien Canivet - René
- Mathieu Bisson - Simon
- Nathanaël De Vries - Enfant melo
- Daniel Martin
- Gabriele Tinti - L'Argentin
