= Act of Aggression (film) =

1975 film

- Directed by: Gérard Pirès
- Written by: Jean-Patrick Manchette; Gérard Pirès
- Produced by: Alain Poiré; Pierre Braunberger
- Starring: Jean-Louis Trintignant; Catherine Deneuve; Claude Brasseur
- Cinematography: Silvano Ippoliti
- Edited by: Jacques Witta
- Music by: Robert Charlebois
- Distributed by: Gaumont Distribution
- Release date: 16 April 1975
- Running time: 101 min.
- Countries: France; Italy
- Language: French

Act of Aggression (French: L'agression) is a 1975 French/Italian thriller film directed by Gérard Pirès.

== Cast ==
- Jean-Louis Trintignant - Paul Varlin
- Catherine Deneuve - Sarah
- Claude Brasseur - André Ducatel
- Philippe Brigaud - Escudero
- Milena Vukotic - Le juge
- Franco Fabrizi - Sauguet
- Delphine Boffy - Patty
- Leonora Fani - Josy
- Michèle Grellier - Hélène
- Jacques Rispal - Raoul Dumouriez
- Robert Charlebois - Justin, un motard
