= Malevil =

1972 novel by Robert Merle

First edition (publ. Gallimard)

Malevil is a 1972 science fiction novel by French writer Robert Merle. It was adapted into a 1981 film directed by Christian de Chalonge and starring Michel Serrault, Jacques Dutronc, Jacques Villeret and Jean-Louis Trintignant.

== Plot summary ==
The story's events take place in rural France in the late twentieth century. The protagonist is Emmanuel Comte, former school director, now turned farmer and landowner. He is also an owner of a tourist attraction - an old castle called Malevil after the nearby village. Comte is a highly motivated, well-respected person with a talent for diplomacy and leadership.

By chance, Emmanuel and several of his friends find themselves in the wine cellar of the castle during the unexpected outbreak of nuclear war. The survivors find their surroundings reduced to ashes and rubble. Together under the leadership of Emmanuel they start to rebuild. They later discover that other people and animals have survived in nearby farmsteads and villages. Nature begins anew and an agrarian society starts to reform. From time to time more survivors show up, some bringing death and destruction with them.

One of the main challenges of the slowly emerging society is to fend off the threat of a new theocratic dictatorship that has taken over a neighboring village with the assistance of a marauding gang.
