= Three Men to Kill =

- Directed by: Jacques Deray
- Screenplay by: Jacques Deray; Alain Delon; Christopher Frank
- Based on: Le Petit Bleu de la côte ouest by Jean-Patrick Manchette
- Produced by: Alain Delon; Alain Terzian
- Starring: Alain Delon; Dalila Di Lazzaro
- Cinematography: Jean Tournier
- Music by: Claude Bolling
- Production companies: Adel Productions; Antenne-2
- Distributed by: Union Générale Cinématographique (UGC)
- Release date: 31 October 1980
- Running time: 95 minutes
- Country: France
- Language: French
- Box office: $16.5 million

Three Men to Kill (French: Trois hommes à abattre) is a French crime film released in 1980, directed by Jacques Deray and starring Alain Delon and Dalila Di Lazzaro. The screenplay is written by Jacques Deray, Alain Delon and Christopher Frank based on the novel Le Petit Bleu de la côte ouest by Jean-Patrick Manchette.

The story is about Michel Gerfaut (Delon), a charming professional card player who out of nowhere becomes involved in some retribution between high level weapon traders.

With 2,194,795 tickets sold, the film ranked 16th at the French box office in 1980. Three Men to Kill is the first film of a group of popular films released in the 1980s and starring Alain Delon that share a visual and narrative style, followed by For a Cop's Hide (1981) and Le battant (1983).

== Plot ==
Michel Gerfaut is a handsome middle-aged man who lives in Paris, France. He has a beautiful girlfriend called Béa and earns his living as a professional poker player. One night, as he is on his way to yet another card game, he comes across a car accident. Noticing that the driver of the crashed car is still alive, he brings him to the hospital. A newspaper article later reveals that the man, who was actually a high-ranking functionary, has died, and that two of his colleagues were killed the same night (the titular three men to kill). The men were assassinated as they were about to blow the whistle on a deal involving faulty guided missiles.

Gerfaut is followed by two hitmen who saw him at the crash site and mistakenly assumed that he is a mercenary hired by competing armament manufacturers to sabotage the deal. After several attempts on the lives of him and his girlfriend are made, Gerfaut flees and follows a series of clues that eventually lead him to the head of the conspiracy, an arms dealer named Emmerich. Emmerich doesn't believe Gerfaut's claims of innocence and becomes furious, causing himself a fatal heart attack. Emmerich's assistant then offers Gerfaut a job as his enforcer, but Gerfaut refuses and walks away, believing everything to be over.

The next day, Gerfaut and his girlfriend are seen having a walk in Paris where another pair of hitmen ambush and shoot Gerfaut.

== Cast ==
- Alain Delon as Michel Gerfaut
- Dalila Di Lazzaro as Béa
- Michel Auclair as Leprince
- Pierre Dux as Emmerich
- Pascale Roberts as Mrs Borel
- Simone Renant as Mrs Gerfaut
- Lyne Chardonnet as nurse
- Jean-Pierre Darras as Chocard
- Bernard Le Coq as Gassowitz
- François Perrot as Etienne Germer
- André Falcon as Jacques Mouzon
- Féodor Atkine as Leblanc
- Christian Barbier as Liethard
- Daniel Breton as Carlo

== Release and reception ==
The film was released in France on October 31, 1980. With 2,194,795 tickets sold, the film ranked 16th at the French box-office that year. It was Delon's most commercially successful film since Two Men in Town (1973).

The Japanese distributors reportedly cut the finale where Delon is assassinated and thus gave the film a happy ending (somewhat more closely resembling the end of the novel).

Pierre Murat wrote in Télérama: "This well-made and efficient thriller by Jacques Deray, where Delon does the perfect Delon and where music plays one of the main roles, definitely has more than one trump card up its sleeve."
