= The Police War =

- Directed by: Robin Davis
- Screenplay by: Jean-Patrick Manchette; Patrick Laurent; Robin Davis; Jean-Marie Guillaume; Jacques Labib
- Story by: Jean-Marie Guillaume; Jacques Labib
- Produced by: Véra Belmont
- Starring: Claude Brasseur; Claude Rich; Marlène Jobert
- Cinematography: Ramón Suárez
- Edited by: José Pinheiro
- Music by: Jean-Marie Sénia
- Production companies: Stéphan Films; Les Productions Jacques Roitfeld
- Distributed by: UGC Distribution
- Release date: November 14, 1979 (France)
- Running time: 103 minutes
- Country: France
- Language: French

The Police War (French: La guerre des polices) is a French police drama film directed by Robin Davis and starring Claude Brasseur, Claude Rich and Marlène Jobert. The French title (literally: "the war of the polices") refers to the rivalry between the two divisions of the French police force: the Territorial Brigade and the Anti-Gang Brigade.

The film is loosely based on the real-life competition between French police divisions to capture gangster Jacques Mesrine, who was considered at the time France's public enemy number one. Mesrine was shot dead by police ten days before the film's release, generating public curiosity and helping the film become a box-office success in France.

== Plot ==
The team of Commissaire Ballestrat from the Territorial Brigade stakes out the hideout of a dangerous criminal named Sarlat. Suddenly, Commissaire Fush and his team from the Anti-Gang Brigade arrive to the site. The ambitious Ballestrat would rather let Sarlat escape than allow the rival team to take credit for the arrest. In the ensuing shootout, Sarlat kills one of Fush's men and flees. From then on, the two teams treat each other with open hostility. The police chief orders Ballestrat to cooperate with the Anti-Gang team. But the two groups would still act separately in their pursuit of Sarlat. Fush becomes close with Marie, one of Ballestrat's team members. She later betrays him by informing her boss of the Anti-Gang's upcoming operation to capture Sarlat's accomplice Manekian. Ballestrat's interference causes a death of an innocent bystander. Fush submits his resignation. Then the massive police ambush against Sarlat misfires, and one of the officers is taken hostage. While the rest of the police prefer to wait the situation out, Fush single-handedly confronts Sarlat, and they are both killed in the resulting stand-off.

== Cast ==
- Claude Brasseur : Jacques Fush
- Claude Rich : Ballestrat
- Gérard Desarthe : Hector Sarlat
- Marlène Jobert : Marie Garcin
- Jean-François Stévenin : Capati
- Georges Staquet : Millard
- Étienne Chicot : Larue
- Jean-Pierre Kalfon : Marc
- Rufus : Le Garrec
- Féodor Atkine : Serge Manékian
- François Périer : Police Chief Colombani
- Ludmila Mikaël : The Magistrate
- David Jalil : Djalloud
- Jean Rougerie : Mermoz
- Jacques Lalande : Pralin
- Roger Miremont : Lagrange
- Franck-Olivier Bonnet : René
- Albert Dray : Francis
- Jacqueline Parent
- Michel Berto

== Release ==
The Police War was released in France on November 14, 1979. The film had 1,792,679 admissions in France and ranked 16th at the 1979 box-office. The film was released on Blu-ray in 2022.

== Reception ==
Claude Brasseur won the César Award for Best Actor at the César Awards.
