= Year of the Jellyfish =

- French: L'Année des méduses
- Directed by: Christopher Frank
- Written by: Christopher Frank
- Produced by: Alain Terzian
- Starring: Bernard Giraudeau; Valérie Kaprisky; Caroline Cellier; Jacques Perrin
- Cinematography: Renato Berta
- Music by: Nina Hagen; Alain Wisniak
- Production company: France 3 Cinema
- Distributed by: Parafrance Films
- Release date: 14 November 1984
- Running time: 110 minutes
- Country: France
- Language: French
- Box office: $11.7 million

Year of the Jellyfish (French: L'année des méduses) is a 1984 French drama film inspired by a novel by Christopher Frank, directed by Frank himself with Valérie Kaprisky and Bernard Giraudeau. The film had a total of 1,554,641 admissions in France where it was the 23rd highest-grossing film of the year.

== Plot ==
The teenage Chris is on holiday at Saint-Tropez with her mother Claude, while her father remains at work in Paris. After seducing a married friend of her parents and undergoing an abortion, she is looking forward to new sexual adventures. Initially she falls for the older Romain, whose interest is in supplying young girls to rich men. For himself, Romain is far more interested in the mother Claude, who gradually thaws to his approaches and becomes his enthusiastic lover. Put out at this, Chris befriends a German married couple but, after a threesome in their hotel room, the husband leaves in disgust. While starting a romance with the abandoned wife (Barbara), Chris murders Romain in order to thwart her mother.

== Principal cast ==
- Bernard Giraudeau: Romain Kalides, the pimp
- Valérie Kaprisky: Chris, the daughter
- Caroline Cellier: Claude, the mother
- Jacques Perrin: Vic, former lover of Chris
- Béatrice Agenin: Marianne Lamotte
- Barbara Nielsen: Barbara, current lover of Chris

== Awards and nominations ==
- César Awards (France)
  - Won: Best Actress – Supporting Role (Caroline Cellier)
