= Malevil (film) =

1981 film directed by Christian de Chalonge

- Directed by: Christian de Chalonge
- Written by: Christian de Chalonge; Pierre Dumayet
- Produced by: Claude Nedjar
- Starring: Michel Serrault; Jacques Dutronc; Jean-Louis Trintignant; Jacques Villeret
- Cinematography: Jean Penzer
- Edited by: Henri Lanoë
- Music by: Gabriel Yared
- Distributed by: UGC Distribution
- Release date: 1981
- Running time: 120 minutes
- Countries: France; West Germany
- Language: French

Malevil is a 1981 French post-apocalyptic film directed by Christian de Chalonge. It's the adaptation of the 1972 science fiction novel Malevil by Robert Merle.

== Plot ==
The film takes place in a small village named "Malevil" within central France. Due to an administrative issue, the mayor, pharmacist, farmers, traders, and other villagers attend a meeting in the local château's large wine cellar on a beautiful sunny day in late summer. However, while the meeting is taking place the radio suddenly cuts out. Moments later, huge explosions occur followed by long and violent flashes. The noise, excessive heat, and moisture cause everyone in the cellar to fall unconscious.

The survivors awaken to find a scorched world where almost nothing remains. They embark on a new life faced with isolationism and violence.

== Cast ==
- Michel Serrault : Emmanuel Comte
- Jacques Dutronc : Colin
- Jean-Louis Trintignant : Fulbert
- Jacques Villeret : Momo
- Robert Dhéry : Peyssou
- Hanns Zischler : le vétérinaire
- Pénélope Palmer : Evelyne
- Jean Leuvrais : Bouvreuil
- Emilie Lihou : La Menou
- Jacqueline Parent : Cathy
- Eduard Linkers : Fabrelatre
- Marianik Revillon : Emma
- Guy Saint-Jean : un gendarme
- Bernard Waver : un gendarme
- Reine Bartève : Judith
- Michel Berto : Bébé007

== Production ==
The screenplay is based on the 1972 novel Malevil by French science fiction writer Robert Merle. Despite using the book's characters, the plot deviates almost entirely from the book. A different ending was also used in the film. Merle, who believed that the spirit of his novel had been misrepresented, asked for his name to be not mentioned in the credits. Instead, the film states the film was only inspired by the novel Malevil (French:inspiré librement du roman Malevil).
