= Christian de Chalonge =

French film director (1937–2025)

- Born: 21 January 1937; Douai, France
- Died: 6 December 2025 (aged 88); Saint-Denis, France
- Occupations: Film director Screenwriter
- Years active: 1968–2009

Christian de Chalonge (21 January 1937 – 6 December 2025) was a French film director and screenwriter. He directed the film The Wedding Ring, which starred Anna Karina. De Chalonge died on 6 December 2025, at the age of 88.

== Biography ==
=== Training and early career ===
A graduate of the IDHEC (Institut des hautes études cinématographiques), Christian de Chalonge began his career as an assistant director to several notable filmmakers, including René Clair, Georges Franju, Alain Jessua, Serge Bourguignon, Henri Verneuil, and Tony Richardson.

=== Career ===
His first feature film, Le Saut (1968), which addressed the plight of immigrant workers, won the Prix Jean Vigo. Three years later, he directed L'Alliance starring Anna Karina and Jean-Claude Carrière, which Le Monde described as

a curious film of a fantastical atmosphere about the animal world

Christian de Chalonge achieved his greatest success with L'Argent des autres (1978), starring Jean-Louis Trintignant, Michel Serrault, and Claude Brasseur. The film earned him the Prix Louis Delluc in 1978, followed by the César Award for Best Film and the Best Director the following year.

In 1981, he adapted Robert Merle's novel Malevil into a film of the same name, starring Michel Serrault, Jacques Dutronc, Jacques Villeret, and Jean-Louis Trintignant. Considered the first major French speculative fiction film, it depicts the difficult survival of a small group of people following a nuclear explosion.

In 1982, he directed Jacques Perrin in Les Quarantièmes rugissants, a film about a solo sailor engaged in a round-the-world race, inspired by the true story of Donald Crowhurst.

In 1990, the director reunited for a fourth time with Michel Serrault for Docteur Petiot. The film was inspired by the French serial killer Dr. Marcel Petiot, who committed 63 murders between 1941 and 1944, targeting primarily Jewish people attempting to flee Nazi persecution by promising to help them leave France.

In 1991, he adapted Jules Supervielle's novel Le Voleur d'enfants into a film starring Marcello Mastroianni.

In 1996, Christian de Chalonge adapted Louis Aragon's novel Les Voyageurs de l'impériale under the film title Le Bel Été 1914, starring Claude Rich and Maria Pacôme.

In 1997, he worked with Michel Serrault for the fifth time in Le Comédien, based on the play by Sacha Guitry.

Beginning in 1990, Christian de Chalonge also directed for television, including two episodes of Claude Chabrol's Les Dossiers secrets de l'inspecteur Lavardin starring Jean Poiret, four episodes of the television series Maigret starring Bruno Cremer, and three plays by Molière featuring Michel Serrault and Christian Clavier. In 1981, he adapted Robert Merle's novel Malevil into a film of the same name, starring Michel Serrault, Jacques Dutronc, Jacques Villeret, and Jean-Louis Trintignant. Considered the first major French speculative fiction film, it depicts the difficult survival of a small group of people following a nuclear explosion.

In 1982, he directed Jacques Perrin in Les Quarantièmes rugissants, a film about a solo sailor engaged in a round-the-world race, inspired by the true story of Donald Crowhurst.

In 1990, the director reunited for a fourth time with Michel Serrault for Docteur Petiot. The film was inspired by the French serial killer Dr. Marcel Petiot, who committed 63 murders between 1941 and 1944, targeting primarily Jewish people attempting to flee Nazi persecution by promising to help them leave France.

In 1991, he adapted Jules Supervielle's novel Le Voleur d'enfants into a film starring Marcello Mastroianni.

In 1996, Christian de Chalonge adapted Louis Aragon's novel Les Voyageurs de l'impériale under the film title Le Bel Été 1914, starring Claude Rich and Maria Pacôme.

In 1997, he worked with Michel Serrault for the fifth time in Le Comédien, based on the play by Sacha Guitry.

Beginning in 1990, Christian de Chalonge also directed for television, including two episodes of Claude Chabrol's Les Dossiers secrets de l'inspecteur Lavardin starring Jean Poiret, four episodes of the television series Maigret starring Bruno Cremer, and three plays by Molière featuring Michel Serrault and Christian Clavier.

== Selected filmography ==
- The Wedding Ring (1970)
- L'Argent des autres (1978)
- Malevil (1981)
- The Roaring Forties (1982)
- Docteur Petiot (1990)
- The Children Thief (1991)
