= The Most Gentle Confessions =

1971 film

- Directed by: Édouard Molinaro
- Written by: Jean-François Hauduroy; Édouard Molinaro
- Based on: Les aveux les plus doux by Georges Arnaud
- Produced by: Christine Gouze-Rénal; Turi Vasile; Ahmed Rachedi
- Starring: Philippe Noiret; Roger Hanin; Caroline Cellier
- Cinematography: Raoul Coutard
- Edited by: Monique Isnardon] Robert Isnardon
- Music by: Georges Delerue
- Production companies: Production Générale de Films; Trianon Films; ONCIC; Office des Actualities Algerienes; Ultra Film
- Distributed by: Metro-Goldwyn-Mayer
- Release date: 19 May 1971
- Running time: 95 minutes
- Countries: Algeria; France; Italy
- Language: French

The Most Gentle Confessions (French: Les aveux les plus doux) is a 1971 crime thriller film directed by Édouard Molinaro and starring Philippe Noiret, Roger Hanin and Caroline Cellier. It was a co-production between France, Italy and Algeria. Location shooting took place around Algiers.

== Cast ==
- Philippe Noiret as L'inspecteur principal Muller
- Roger Hanin as L'inspecteur Borelli
- Caroline Cellier as Catherine Claudie Jorgen
- Marc Porel as Jean Dubreuil
- Hassan El-Hassani as Le notaire
- Gérard Landry as Lopez
- Nourredine Agoulmine as Le jeune policier
- Pierre Couderc as Thomas
- Raymond Louzoum as Henri le Costaud
- Rachid Merabtine as Carl
- Léa Nanni as Elsa
- Giuseppe Addobbati as Le maire

== Bibliography ==
- Maillet, Dominique. Philippe Noiret. 1989.
- Rège, Philippe. Encyclopedia of French Film Directors, Volume 1. Scarecrow Press, 2009.
