= Max Cabanes =

French illustrator and cartoonist (born 1947)

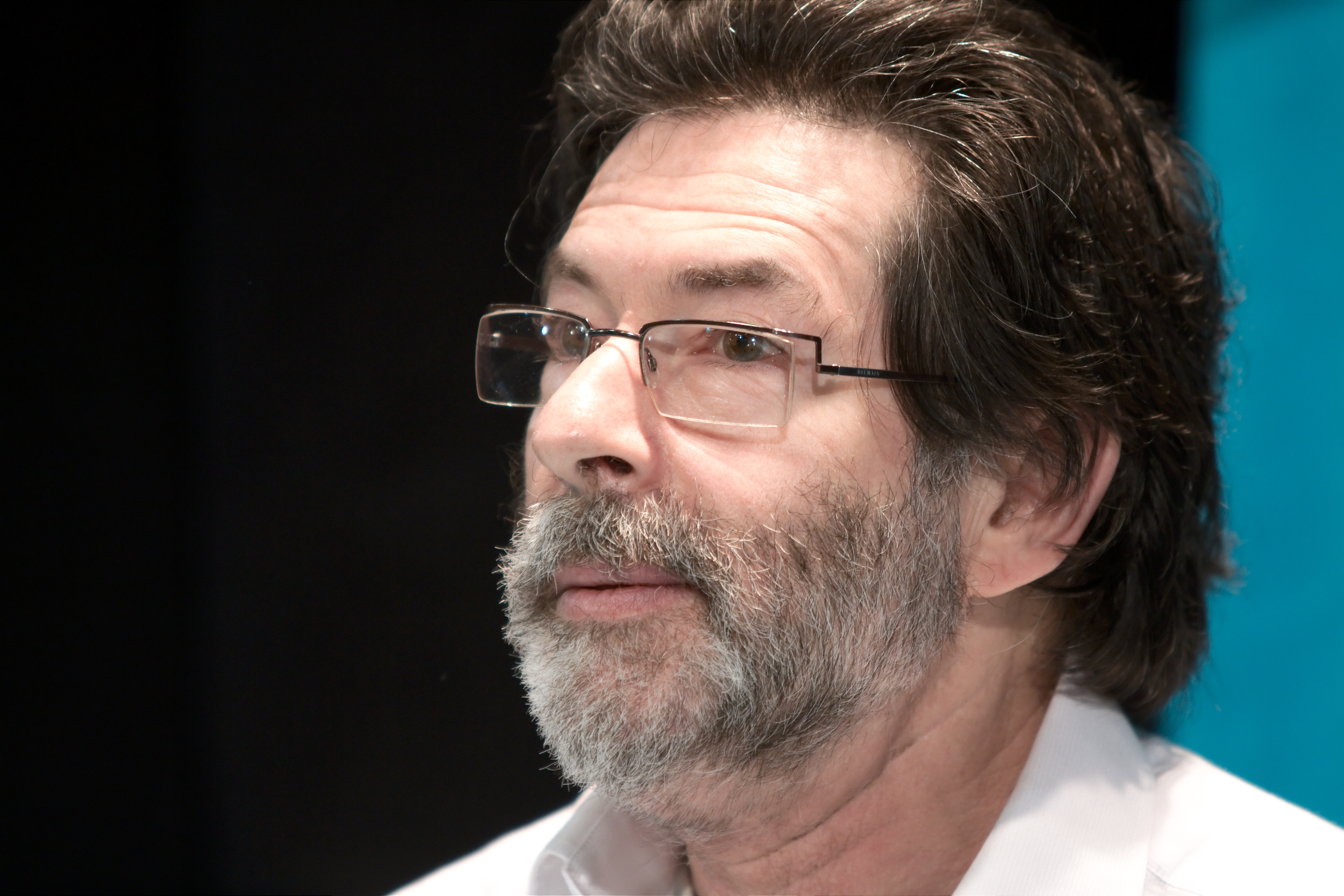
- Born: 22 September 1947 (age 78); Béziers, Hérault, France
- Occupations: Comics artist, illustrator

Max Cabanes (born 22 September 1947) is a French illustrator and comic book author, best known for his fantasy series Dans les villages (published since 1977) and for his comic books recounting the lives of young people in the 1960s and 1970s (Heart-Throbs, Les Années pattes d'eph’, Bouquet de flirts). Comfortable with all drawing techniques and able to excel in a wide range of genres (fantasy, social commentary, detective stories), he was awarded in 1990 the Grand prix de la ville d'Angoulême, the highest honor for a French-speaking comics author.

== Published works ==
=== Periodical ===
Dans les villages :

1. Dans les villages, AUDIE, 1977. In subsequent editions it is titled La jôle.
2. L'Anti-jôle, Dargaud, 1982
3. La Crognote rieuse, Dargaud, 1984
4. Le Rêveur de réalité, Dargaud, 1986
5. L'École de la cruauté, Dupuis, coll. « Expresso », 2005
6. Une Fuite, deux horizons, Dupuis, coll. « Expresso », 2006
7. La Déroute des synapses, Dupuis, coll. « Expresso », 2008
- Contes fripons, AUDIE, 1979
- Rencontres du 3rd sale type, Dargaud, coll. « Pilote », 1982
- Bains d'encre, Futuropolis, coll. « Hic et nunc », 1982
- Le Roman de Renart (dessin), avec Jean-Claude Forest (scénario), Futuropolis, coll. 30/40, 1985
1. Colin Maillard, 1989 (English translation:Heart-Throbs, Catalan Communications, 1991)
2. Maxou contre l’athlète, 1997
- Les Années pattes d'eph’, Albin Michel, 1992
- Bouquets de Flirts, Albin Michel, 1996
- Bellagamba (art), with Claude Klotz (writer), Casterman, coll.
1. La Chasse aux ombres, 1999
2. Les Saisonniers, 2002
- La Maison Winchester, Glénat, coll. « La Loge noire », 2004
- La Princesse du sang, Dupuis, adapted from the novel by Jean-Patrick Manchette
- Fatale, with Doug Headline (scénario), Dupuis coll. « Aire libre», adapted from the novel by Jean-Patrick Manchette, 2014
- Nada, with Doug Headline (writer), Dupuis coll. « Aire libre », adapted from the novel by Jean-Patrick Manchette, 2018
- Morgue pleine, with Doug Headline (writer), Dupuis coll. « Aire libre», adapted from the novel by Jean-Patrick Manchette, 2021

=== Children's albums ===
- L’Homme qui fait le tour du monde written by Pierre Christin, with Philippe Aymond (drawings), Dargaud, 1994

Max Cabanes has illustrated youth novels, including:

- Concertino, by Jean-Henri Potier, L’école des loisirs, 1978
- La Chanson des sirènes, by Michel Piquemal, Milan, 1998
- Petit lexique des sorcières, by Marie-Charlotte Delmas, Syros jeunesse, coll.
- La Course du guépard, by Jean-Charles Bernardini (éditions Mango Jeunesse, coll. Le cercle magique, 2002)
