= It Was the War of the Trenches =

1993 graphic novel by Jacques Tardi

'It Was the War of the Trenches' ('C'était la guerre des tranchées')
- Cover
- Date: 1993.

Creative team
- Writers: Jacques Tardi
- Artists: Jacques Tardi

Original publication
- Published in: A Suivre
- Language: French

It Was the War of the Trenches (original title: C'était la guerre des tranchées) is a 1993 graphic novel by Jacques Tardi about World War I. It is acclaimed as one of his best works and received praise from Art Spiegelman and Joe Sacco. Paul Gravett listed it in his 1001 Comics You Must Read Before You Die.

== Concept ==
C'était la guerre des tranchées was pre-published in A Suivre. The novel is a series of anecdotal stories set in the trenches of World War One. Many are based on stories Tardi remembered from his grandfather, who was a veteran of that war, and books he read about the topic. He said: "When I was small, my grandmother used to tell me stories about my grandfather in the First World War. I think the first book I read that wasn't a picture book was a war story about an army dog who saved his master. And I still get this recurring nightmare of finding myself standing in front of a Call-Up poster - it's a personal anxiety of mine, being caught up in a situation I can't control." The stories focus on the daily horrors and injustices soldiers experienced. Tardi had dealt with World War One as a subject before in Adieu Brindavoine, published in Pilote (1972-1973) and Le Fleur au Fusil (1974). It Was the War of the Trenches is a more ambitious work for whom Tardi documented himself thoroughly, asking advice from various historians and based his drawings on numerous photographs from this period. The comic has a clear anti-war theme, reflecting the soldiers who are permanently physically and psychologically scarred and the numerous who died for a seemingly pointless cause, which are portrayed in brutal graphic detail.

== Translations ==
An English translation was published in RAW and Drawn & Quarterly in the 1990s. In 2010 it was translated in English as It Was the War of the Trenches and published by Fantagraphics. It won two Eisner Awards for Best Reality-Based Work and Best U.S. Edition of International Material.

== Similar books ==
Tardi published another two-volume graphic novel about World War I named Putain de Guerre (2008, translated as Goddamn this War!).
