= Léo Malet =

French novelist (1909–1996)

Léo Malet (1909–1996) was a French crime novelist and surrealist. He was known for creating the Parisian private eye Nestor Burma.

== Biography ==
Leo Malet was born in Montpellier.

In the 1930s, he was closely aligned with the Surrealists, and was close friends with André Breton, René Magritte and Yves Tanguy, amongst others. During this time, he published several volumes of poetry.

== Selected bibliography ==
- 120, rue de la Gare (1943)
- Le cinquième procédé (1948)
- Le soleil naît derrière le Louvre (1954) (First of the "New Mysteries of Paris" series)
- Des kilomètres de linceuls (1955)
- Fièvre au Marais (1955)
- La nuit de Saint-Germain-des-Prés (1955)
- M'as-tu vu en cadavre (1956)
- Brouillard au pont de Tolbiac (1956)
- Casse-pipe à la Nation (1957)
- Micmac moche au Boul' Mich' (1957)
- Nestor Burma court la poupée (1971)
- Poste restante (1983)

== Comic book adaptations ==
- Brouillard au pont de Tolbiac (Casterman, 1982); drawn by: Jacques Tardi
- 120, rue de la Gare (Casterman, 1988); drawn by: Jacques Tardi
- Une gueule de bois en plomb (Casterman, 1990); drawn by: Jacques Tardi
- Casse-pipe à la Nation (Casterman, 1996); drawn by: Jacques Tardi
- M'as-tu vu en cadavre ? (Casterman, 2000); drawn by: Jacques Tardi

== Filmography ==
- 120, rue de la Gare, directed by Jacques Daniel-Norman (1946), with René Dary (as Nestor Burma)
- La Nuit d'Austerlitz, directed by Stellio Lorenzi (TV film, 1954), with Daniel Sorano (as Nestor Burma)
- The Enigma of the Folies-Bergere, directed by Jean Mitry (1959), with Bella Darvi, Frank Villard, Dora Doll
- La Nuit de Saint-Germain-des-Prés, directed by Bob Swaim (1977), with Michel Galabru (as Nestor Burma)
- Nestor Burma, détective de choc, directed by Jean-Luc Miesch (1982), with Michel Serrault (as Nestor Burma), Jane Birkin
- Les Rats de Montsouris, directed by Maurice Frydland (TV film, 1988), with Gérard Desarthe (as Nestor Burma)
- Nestor Burma (TV series, 39 episodes, 1991–2003), with Guy Marchand (as Nestor Burma)
