= The Roaring Forties =

1982 film by Christian de Chalonge

- Directed by: Christian de Chalonge
- Written by: André G. Brunelin; Jacques Perrin; Nicolas Tomalin
- Produced by: Christian Ferry; Perrine Pavie]Jacques Perrin
- Starring: Jacques Perrin; Julie Christie; Michel Serrault
- Cinematography: Patrick Blossier; Jean Penzer; Luciano Tovoli
- Edited by: Luc Barnier; Henri Lanoë
- Music by: Henri Lanoë
- Production companies: Cinéma 7; TF1 Films Production
- Distributed by: Gaumont Distribution
- Release date: 11 August 1982
- Running time: 132 minutes
- Country: France
- Language: French

The Roaring Forties (French: Les quarantièmes rugissants) is a 1982 French drama film directed by Christian de Chalonge and starring Jacques Perrin, Julie Christie and Michel Serrault. The film was loosely based on the book The Strange Last Voyage of Donald Crowhurst by Nicholas Tomalin about the death of the British businessman and amateur sailor Donald Crowhurst, who disappeared while competing in the Sunday Times Golden Globe Race, a single-handed, round-the-world yacht race held in 1968–69.

The film's sets were designed by the art director Max Douy. It was partly made at the Billancourt Studios in Paris. Location shooting took place around Finistère.

== Cast ==
- Jacques Perrin as Julien Dantec
- Julie Christie as Catherine Dantec
- Michel Serrault as Sébastien Barral
- Gila von Weitershausen as Emilie Dubuisson
- Heinz Weiss as Joss
- [ean Leuvrais as Dorange
- François Perrot as TV Host
- Christian Ferry]as Granville
- Bernard Lincot as Janvier
- Eric Raphaël as Denis Dantec
- Solena Morane as Valérie Dantec
- Mohammed Jalloh as Carlos
- Guy Parigot as Gouarzin
- Sébastien Keran as Jaouen
- René Dupré as Pietro Corres
