= The Gunman (2015 film) =

2015 film by Pierre Morel

- Theatrical release poster
- Directed by: Pierre Morel
- Screenplay by: Don Macpherson; Pete Travis; Sean Penn
- Based on: The Prone Gunman by Jean-Patrick Manchette
- Produced by: Adrian Guerra; Sean Penn; Peter McAleese; Andrew Rona; Joel Silver
- Starring: Sean Penn; Idris Elba; Ray Winstone; Mark Rylance; Jasmine Trinca; Peter Franzén; Javier Bardem
- Cinematography: Flavio Labiano
- Edited by: Frédéric Thoraval
- Music by: Marco Beltrami
- Production companies: StudioCanal; Anton Capital Entertainment; Canal+; Nostromo Pictures; Silver Pictures; TF1 Films Production
- Distributed by: Open Road Films (United States); StudioCanal (United Kingdom and France); DeAPlaneta (Spain)
- Release dates: February 16, 2015 (London); March 20, 2015 (United States); June 24, 2015 (France)
- Running time: 115 minutes
- Countries: United States; United Kingdom; Spain; France
- Language: English
- Budget: $40 million
- Box office: $24.2 million

The Gunman is a 2015 action thriller film directed by Pierre Morel, based on the novel The Prone Gunman by Jean-Patrick Manchette. Sean Penn stars as a mercenary who assassinates the mining minister of the Democratic Republic of Congo in 2006 on orders from multinational mining companies. Eight years after Terrier has retired from mercenary work, he and the people close to him become the targets of hit squads sent by a powerful multinational security firm, and he must fight to stay alive. The cast includes Javier Bardem, Idris Elba, Mark Rylance, Jasmine Trinca, and Ray Winstone.

The Gunman was released on March 20, 2015, by Open Road Films. It was a box office bomb, grossing $24 million against a $40 million budget and receiving a poor critical reception.

== Plot ==
American Jim Terrier is a former Special Forces soldier who has become a black-ops mercenary. He is part of a team deployed by a corporation in the Democratic Republic of Congo in 2006, under the cover of providing security to local projects. He falls in love with Annie, a fellow expat working as an NGO doctor in a local hospital. During this period, even though civil war has wreaked havoc on the country, large multinational mining companies continue to profit from the country's mining industry. After the Minister of Mining announces his plans to declare contracts with the mining companies unjust and renegotiate the terms, the mining companies hire Terrier's team to assassinate the Minister to ensure their access to the rich mineral resources. Terrier delivers the fatal shot from a sniper rifle and flees from Africa, leaving Annie behind. After that, Terrier retires from his mercenary career.

Eight years later he returns to DRC as a charity worker to build wells. One day Terrier is brutally assaulted by a local hit squad, but he manages to kill them all. While searching the attackers' bodies, he finds signs that the attack was not random and that he was the target. Scared and suspicious, Terrier flees to London to meet an ex-mercenary colleague Cox, who reveals that Felix Marti, their ex-boss in the Congo assassination, has formed a large international security firm offering its services to major clients, such as the Pentagon. The firm's head wants to eliminate all of the former members of the assassination squad as revelations of their former activities could hinder the development of the new firm. Now the firm's hit teams chase Terrier around the clock, meanwhile killing his friends, including Felix, Stanley and kidnapping Annie.

However, Terrier still keeps highly compromising materials that can reveal Cox's role in the Congo assassination and uses it to lure Cox and his team to a bullfight in Spain, threatening to expose their complicity unless they trade Annie for the evidence. Unknown to them, Terrier makes a deal with Interpol to provide evidence to aid their ongoing investigation. Despite battling severe head trauma suffered from his violent past, Terrier defeats the experienced mercenaries sent to kill him. As he struggles to help Annie escape to safety, Cox discovers them. Terrier is wounded but manages to shoot Cox, who is then gored by a loose bull. Interpol officers arrive and take Terrier into custody, though Agent Barnes promises to do what he can to help Terrier avoid doing more jail time than necessary.

The film ends with Terrier, recovered and released from prison, reuniting with Annie in the DRC.

== Cast ==
- Sean Penn as Jim Terrier
- Javier Bardem as Felix Marti
- Idris Elba as Interpol Agent Jackie Barnes
- Mark Rylance as Terrance Cox
- Jasmine Trinca as Annie
- Ray Winstone as Stanley Edgerton
- Peter Franzén as Reiniger
- Billy Billingham as Reed
- Daniel Adegboyega as Bryson
- Ade Oyefeso as Eugene
- Clive Curtis as Minister of Mines Patrick Ngobo

== Production ==
=== Development ===
Circa January 2013, French action director Pierre Morel (Taken) entered negotiations to direct Sean Penn in Prone Gunman, an action thriller being produced by Silver Pictures’ Joel Silver and Andrew Rona. The film is based on the 1981 novel The Prone Gunman by French crime novelist Jean-Patrick Manchette. The project, from Silver Pictures, was fully financed by StudioCanal, who sold out rights to the film at the 2013 Cannes Film Festival.

In May 2013, Deadline Hollywood reported that Javier Bardem would play a villain. In June, Deadline stated that Ray Winstone had just joined the project. He played a mentor of the hitman (Penn), who is betrayed and then hunted by the organization he worked for. Italian actress Jasmine Trinca was cast as the female lead. Bardem played Trinca’s husband, and Elba played a mysterious operative named Dupont.

Prior to filming, Sean Penn visited Peoria Arizona for training on the weapons used in the movie.

On May 8, 2014, Open Road Films acquired the US distribution rights to the film.

=== Filming ===
Principal photography took place in the spring of 2013 in Barcelona and Logroño, Spain; Gibraltar; Cape Town, South Africa; and Wimbledon Studios, England.

== Reception ==
=== Box office ===
The Gunman grossed $10.7 million in the United States and Canada and $13.5 million in other territories for a worldwide total of $24.2 million, against a production budget of $40 million.

The film grossed $5 million in its opening weekend, finishing 4th at the box office.

=== Critical response ===
The review aggregator website Rotten Tomatoes gave the film an approval rating of 15% based on 180 reviews, with an average rating of 4.4/10. The site's critical consensus reads, "With an uninspired plot and rote set pieces that are overshadowed by its star's physique, The Gunman proves a muddled misfire in the rapidly aging Over-50 Action Hero genre." On Metacritic, which assigns a normalized rating, the film has a score of 39 out of 100, based on 41 critics, indicating "generally unfavorable reviews". Audiences polled by CinemaScore gave the film a grade of "B−" on an A+ to F scale.

Guy Lodge of Variety called it a "rote, humorless thriller" and "a distinctly unconvincing attempt to refashion the star – who also co-wrote and produced – as a middle-aged action hero in the Liam Neeson mold." Ann Hornaday of The Washington Post wrote: "The Gunman may start as a genre exercise of promising purpose, but it winds up being just a lot of bull."
