= Maigret (1991 TV series) =

French television series

- Genre: Mystery
- Based on: Stories by Georges Simenon
- Starring: Bruno Cremer
- Composer: Laurent Petitgirard
- Countries of origin: Belgium; France; Czech Republic; Switzerland
- Original language: French
- No. of seasons: 14
- No. of episodes: 54 (list of episodes)

Production
- Running time: 90 minutes

Original release
- Network: France 2
- Release: December 1, 1991 – December 23, 2004

Maigret is a French language television serial based on Georges Simenon's books, that was broadcast from 1991 to 2004. Detective Jules Maigret was played by Bruno Cremer. Only actor Jean Richard has portrayed Maigret more than Bruno Cremer.

== Cast ==
=== Main ===
- Bruno Cremer as Detective Jules Maigret

=== Recurring ===
- Anne Bellec as Madame Maigret (seasons 1-5)
- Jean-Claude Frissung and Jean O'Cottrell as Detective Janvier (seasons 1-11)
- Philippe Pollet as Detective LaPointe (seasons 1-2)
- Claude Faraldo as Palmari (seasons 2-3)
- François-Régis Marchasson and Philippe Lejour as Judge Coméliau (seasons 2-3)
- Jean-Pierre Gos as Detective Lucas (seasons 2-4)
- Erick Desmarestz as Judge Benneau (seasons 2-5)
- Michel Dussin, Bernard Papineau and Jean-Claude Calon as Doctor Paul (seasons 2-13)
- Éric Prat as Detective Torrence (seasons 3-5)
- Alexandre Brasseur as Inspector Paul Lachenal (seasons 9-11)
- Fabien Béhar as Inspector Luciani (seasons 9-10)
- Laurent Schilling and Olivier Darimont as Inspector Lambert (seasons 11-13)
- Bruno Abraham-Kremer as Inspector Lorenzi (season 11)
- Pierre Diot as Inspector Christiani (seasons 11-14)
- Matthias Van Khache as Inspector Maury (season 12)
- Jean-Paul Bonnaire as Inspector Battisti (seasons 12-14)

=== Guest ===
- Karin Viard as Thérèse (season 1)
- Catherine Hosmalin as The prostitute (season 2)
- Myriam Boyer as Élyane Michonnet (season 2)
- Andréa Ferréol as Mariette (season 3)
- Françoise Bertin as Catherine (season 4)
- François Perrot as Professor Gouin (season 4)
- Frédéric Pierrot as Canut (season 4)
- Béatrice Agenin as Arlette (season 4)
- Marie-Christine Adam as Irène Salavin / Antoinette's assistant (season 4 & 14)
- Albert Delpy as The captain (season 5)
- Arielle Dombasle as Mylène Turner (season 7)
- Ginette Garcin as Denise (season 7)
- Laure Duthilleul as Evelyne Tremblet (season 9)
- Jeanne Herry as Félicie (season 11)
- Philippe Duquesne as Louis Paumelle (season 12)
- Pascale Arbillot as Gisèle Marton (season 13)
- Valérie Karsenti as Isabelle Fresco (season 14)

== Episodes ==
Season	Episodes	Originally released	
Season	Episodes	First released	Last released
1	4	1 December 1991	7 June 1992
2	4	11 September 1992	7 May 1993
3	3	10 December 1993	15 April 1994
4	6	11 September 1994	16 June 1995
5	4	8 September 1995	23 February 1996
6	3	27 September 1996	1 November 1996
7	4	3 October 1997	9 January 1998
8	2	15 January 1999	5 February 1999
9	3	26 November 1999	26 May 2000
10	3	16 February 2001	22 June 2001
11	4	18 January 2002	3 June 2002
12	4	11 November 2002	30 June 2003
13	6	September 29, 2003	May 28, 2004
14	4	November 4, 2004	December 23, 2004

For exhaustive detail refer to fr:Épisodes de Maigret (1991-2005) (in French).

== Satellite ==
From 2022, British television channel, Talking Pictures TV have been broadcasting the series on their satellite channel.

== Home media ==
In 2018, MHz Choice announced they had digitally remastered and re-subtitled the entire series. The show was available for HD streaming or purchase on SD DVD.
