= Jacques Tardi =

French comics artist (born 1946)

Tardi
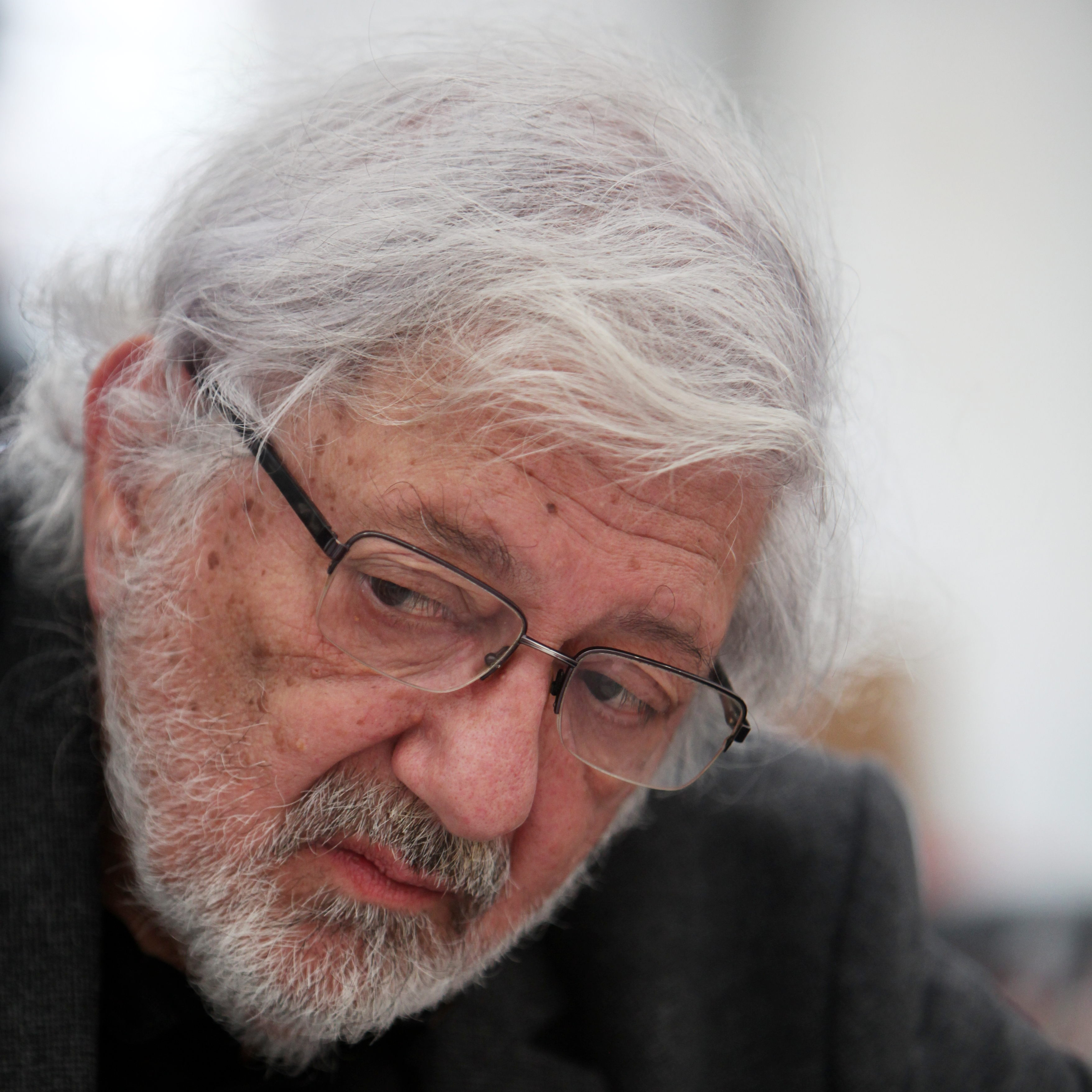
- Jacques Tardi at BDFil 2021
- Born: Jacques Tardi; 30 August 1946 (age 80) Valence, Drôme, France
- Areas: Writer, Artist
- Notable works: Adieu, Brindavoine; Adèle Blanc-Sec; It Was the War of the Trenches; Griffu; Ici Même; Tueur de cafards
- Awards: Full list

Jacques Tardi (French: [taʁdi]; born 30 August 1946) is a French comic artist. He is often credited solely as Tardi.

== Biography ==
Tardi was born on 30 August 1946 in Valence, Drôme. After graduating from the École nationale des beaux-arts de Lyon and the École nationale supérieure des arts décoratifs in Paris, he started drawing comics in 1969, at the age of 23, in the Franco-Belgian comics magazine Pilote, initially illustrating short stories written by Jean Giraud and Serge de Beketch, before creating the political fiction story Rumeur sur le Rouergue from a scenario by Pierre Christin in 1972. Tardi especially gained fame and recognition with his graphic novels about the horror and misery of The First World War, like It Was The War of the Trenches.

In the English language, many of Tardi's books are published by Fantagraphics Books, edited and translated by Fantagraphics' co-founder Kim Thompson.

In 2013, Tardi was nominated as a Chevalier in France's Legion of Honour, the country's highest distinction. However, he turned down the distinction, citing that he will "remain a free man and not be held hostage by any power whatsoever."

== Awards ==
- 1974: Grand Prix Phénix
- 1975: Award for Best French Artist at the Angoulême International Comics Festival, France

– Grand Prix for Black Humor

- 1977: Best Foreign Artist at the Prix Saint-Michel, Belgium
- 1982: Award for best comic by "l'Association 813" at the Festival du Polar in Reims
- 1985: Grand Prix de la ville d'Angoulême, France

– Knighted in the Ordre des Arts et des Lettres, France

- 1986: Adamson Award, Sweden
- 1990: Best German-language Comic/Comic-related Publication at the Max & Moritz Prizes, Germany
- 1991: Special mention at the Best Promotional Comic Award at the Angoulême International Comics Festival
- 1994: Audience Award at the Angoulême International Comics Festival

– Best German-language Comic/Comic-related Publication at the Max & Moritz Prizes, Germany

- 1998: nominated for the Award for Best Comic Book at the Angoulême International Comics Festival
- 2002: Audience Award and Award for Artwork at the Angoulême International Comics Festival

– nominated for the Prix de la critique and the Canal BD Award at the Angoulême International Comics Festival

- 2003: nominated for the Audience Award at the Angoulême International Comics Festival
- 2004: nominated for Best American Edition of Foreign Material at the Harvey Awards, U.S.
- 2005: nominated for Award for a Series at the Angoulême International Comics Festival
- 2006: nominated for the Award for Best Comic Book and the Audience Award at the Angoulême International Comics Festival
- 2006: Special Prize for outstanding life's work at the Max & Moritz Prizes, Germany

– nominated for the Grand Prix Saint-Michel

- 2007: nominated for the Grand Prix Saint-Michel
- 2010: nominated for the Press Prize at the Prix Saint-Michel
- 2011: winner of two Eisner Awards
- 2022: winner of Einhard-Preis

== Bibliography ==
=== Scenario and artwork ===
- Adieu Brindavoine followed by La Fleur au fusil (Casterman, 1974)
- Le Démon des glaces (with characters by Léo Malet) (Casterman, 1974), ISBN 2-205-00857-9
- La Véritable Histoire du soldat inconnu (Futuropolis, 1974)
- Mouh Mouh (Yellow Submarine, 1979)
- Déprime (Futuropolis, 1981)
- Le Trou d'obus (Imagerie Pellerin, 1984), ISBN 2-86207-073-4
- C'était la guerre des tranchées (Casterman, 1993), ISBN 2-203-35905-6
- Les Aventures extraordinaires d'Adèle Blanc-Sec (Casterman, 1976–2022)
  1. "Adèle et la bête" (1976), ISBN 2-203-30501-0
  2. "Le Démon de la tour Eiffel" (1976), ISBN 2-203-30502-9
  3. "Le Savant fou" (1977), ISBN 2-203-30503-7
  4. "Momies en folie" (1978), ISBN 2-203-30504-5
  5. "Le Secret de la salamandre" (1981), ISBN 2-203-30506-1
  6. "Le Noyé à deux têtes" (1985), ISBN 2-203-30507-X
  7. "Tous des monstres !" (1994), ISBN 2-203-30508-8
  8. "Le Mystère des profondeurs" (1998), ISBN 2-203-30509-6
  9. "Le Labyrinthe infernal" (2007), ISBN 978-2-203-00736-9
  10. "Le Bébé des Buttes-Chaumont" (2022).
- Putain de Guerre! (Casterman, 2008), ISBN 2203017392
- Moi, René Tardi, Prisonnier de guerre – stalag IIB (Casterman, 2012), ISBN 978-2-203-04898-0

=== Adaptations ===
- Nestor Burma, based on novels by Léo Malet (Casterman, 1982–2000)
  1. Brouillard au pont de Tolbiac (Casterman, 1982), ISBN 2-203-33413-4
  2. 120, rue de la Gare (Casterman, 1988), ISBN 2-203-34302-8
  3. Une gueule de bois en plomb (Casterman, 1990), ISBN 2-203-34802-X
  4. Casse-pipe à la Nation (Casterman, 1996), ISBN 2-203-39903-1
  5. M'as-tu vu en cadavre? (Casterman, 2000), ISBN 2-203-39925-2
- Jeux pour mourir based on a novel by Géo-Charles Véran (Casterman, 1992), ISBN 2-203-35902-1
- Le Der des Ders, based on a novel by Didier Daeninckx (Casterman, 1997), ISBN 2-203-39906-6
- Le Cri du peuple, based on a novel by Jean Vautrin (Casterman, 2001–2004)
  1. Les canons du 18 mars (2001), ISBN 2-203-39927-9
  2. L'espoir assassiné (2002), ISBN 2-203-39929-5
  3. Les heures sanglantes (2003), ISBN 2-203-39930-9
  4. Le testament des ruines (2004), ISBN 2-203-39931-7
- Le Petit Bleu de la côte ouest (Les Humanoïdes Associés, 2005), based on a novel by Jean-Patrick Manchette
- Le secret de l'étrangleur (Casterman, 2006), based on a novel by Pierre Siniac
- La Position du tireur couché (Futuropolis, 2010), based on a novel by Manchette
- Ô dingos, ô châteaux! (Futuropolis, 2011), based on a novel by Manchette

=== Artwork ===
- Rumeurs sur le Rouergue (scenario by Pierre Christin) (Gallimard, 1976)
- Polonius (bande dessinée) (scenario by Philippe Picaret) (Futuropolis, 1977)
- Griffu (scenario by Jean-Patrick Manchette) (Square, then Dargaud, then Casterman, 1978)
- Ici Même (scenario by Jean-Claude Forest) (Casterman, 1979), ISBN 2-203-33401-0
- Tueur de cafards (scenario by Benjamin Legrand) (Casterman, 1984), ISBN 2-203-33803-2
- Grange bleue (scenario by Dominique Grange) (Futuropolis, 1985)
- Le sens de la houppelande (scenario by Daniel Pennac) (Futuropolis, 1991), ISBN 2-7376-2739-7
- Un strapontin pour deux (scenario by Michel Boujut) (Casterman, 1995)
- L'évasion du cheval gris (scenario by Claude Verrien) (Sapristi, 1996)
- Sodome et Virginie (scenario by Daniel Prevost) (Casterman, 1996), ISBN 2-207-24487-3
- Varlot soldat (scenario by Didier Daeninckx) (L'Association, 1999), ISBN 2-84414-010-6
- La débauche (scenario by Daniel Pennac) (Futuropolis, 2000), ISBN 2-07-078800-8
- New York mi amor (fr) (Dominique Grange, Benjamin Legrand) (Casterman, 2008) ISBN 9782203013148

=== Scenario ===
- Le voyage d'Alphonse (artwork by Antoine Leconte) (Duculot, 2003)

=== Sketchbooks ===
- Mine de plomb (Futuropolis, 1985)
- Chiures de gommes (Futuropolis, 1985)
- Tardi en banlieue (Casterman, 1990), ISBN 2-203-38018-7
- Carnet (JC Menu, 2001), ISBN 2-84414-099-8

=== Illustrated novels ===
Céline adaptations:

- Voyage au bout de la nuit (Futuropolis, 1988), ISBN 2-7376-2615-3
- Casse-pipe (Futuropolis, 1989), ISBN 2-7376-2658-7
- Mort à crédit (Futuropolis, 1991), ISBN 2-7376-2703-6

Jules Verne adaptations:

- Un prêtre en 1839 (Cherche Midi, 1992), ISBN 2-86274-247-3
- San Carlos (Cherche Midi, 1993), ISBN 2-86274-267-8

=== Novel ===
- Rue des Rebuts (Alain Beaulet, 1990)

=== In English ===
- Adèle and the Beast – Adèle et la bête (NBM Publishing 1990), ISBN 0-918348-85-4
- The Demon of the Eiffel Tower – Le Démon de la tour Eiffel (NBM Publishing, 1990), ISBN 1-56163-001-2
- The Mad Scientist and Mummies on Parade – Le Savant fou and Momies en folie (NBM Publishing, 1996), ISBN 1-56163-156-6
- The Secret of the Salamander – Le Secret de la salamandre (NBM Publishing, 1992)
- The Bloody Streets of Paris – 120, rue de la Gare (iBooks, 2003), ISBN 0-7434-7448-1
- West Coast Blues – Le petit bleu de la côte ouest (Fantagraphics, 2009), ISBN 978-1-60699-295-1
- You Are There – Ici Même (Fantagraphics, 2009), ISBN 978-1-60699-294-4
- It Was the War of the Trenches – C'était la guerre des tranchées (Fantagraphics, 2010) ISBN 978-1-60699-353-8
- The Extraordinary Adventures of Adèle Blanc-Sec Vol. 1: Pterror Over Paris and The Eiffel Tower Demon – Adèle et la bête and Le Démon de la tour Eiffel (Fantagraphics, 2010), ISBN 978-1-60699-382-8
- The Arctic Marauder – Le Démon des glaces (Fantagraphics, 2011) ISBN 978-1-60699-435-1
- Like a Sniper Lining Up His Shot – La Position du tireur couché (Fantagraphics, 2011), ISBN 978-1-60699-448-1
- The Extraordinary Adventures of Adèle Blanc-Sec Vol. 2: The Mad Scientist and Mummies on Parade – Le Savant fou and Momies en folie (Fantagraphics, 2011), ISBN 978-1-60699-493-1
- New York Mon Amour – Collects Cockroach Killer, It's So Hard..., Manhattan, Hung's Murderer, (Fantagraphics, 2021), ISBN 978-1-60699-524-2
- Goddamn This War – Putain de Guerre! (Fantagraphics, 2013), ISBN 978-1-60699-582-2
- Run Like Crazy Run Like Hell – Ô dingos, ô châteaux! (Fantagraphics, 2015), ISBN 978-1-60699-620-1
- Fog Over Tolbiac Bridge: A Nestor Burma Mystery – Brouillard au pont de Tolbiac (Fantagraphics, 2017), ISBN 978-1606997055
- I, Rene Tardi, Prisoner of War in Stalag IIB (Fantagraphics, 2018), ISBN 978-1683961086
- I, Rene Tardi, Prisoner of War in Stalag IIB Vol. 2: My Return Home (Fantagraphics, 2019), ISBN 978-1683961796
- I, Rene Tardi, Prisoner of War in Stalag IIB Vol. 3: After the War (Fantagraphics, 2020), ISBN 978-1683963660
- Streets of Paris, Streets of Murder: The Complete Noir Stories of Manchette & Tardi Vol. 1 – Collects Griffu, West Coast Blues, Unfinished Stories, Fatal, and Nada (Fantagraphics, 2020), ISBN 978-1683962861
- Streets of Paris, Streets of Murder: The Complete Noir Stories of Manchette & Tardi Vol. 2 – Collects Like a Sniper Lining Up His Shot & Run Like Crazy Run Like Hell (Fantagraphics, 2020), ISBN 978-1683963202
- Farewell, Brindavoine (Fantagraphics, 2021), ISBN 978-1683964339
- Elise and the New Partisans (Fantagraphics, 2024), ISBN 978-1683967552
