= The Arctic Marauder =

1974 comic book by Jacques Tardi

The Arctic Marauder (Le démon des glaces)
- Date: 1974
- Page count: 64 pages
- Publisher: Dargaud

Creative team
- Writer: Jacques Tardi
- Artist: Jacques Tardi

Original publication
- Language: French

Translation
- Publisher: Fantagraphics
- Date: 2011
- ISBN: 978-1606994351
- Translator: Kim Thompson

The Arctic Marauder (French: Le Démon des glaces) is a 1974 comic book by the French writer and artist Jacques Tardi. Set in an alternative late 19th century with Jules Verne-inspired technology, it concerns how ships mysteriously explode in the Arctic region and how a medical student goes there to investigate, finding a connection to his scientist uncle.

When The Arctic Marauder was published in English in 2011, Publishers Weekly called it "a baroque masterpiece" and NPR called it "ur-steampunk — one of the works that laid the groundwork for a genre".
