= Kim Thompson =

American comic book editor, and publisher (1956–2013)

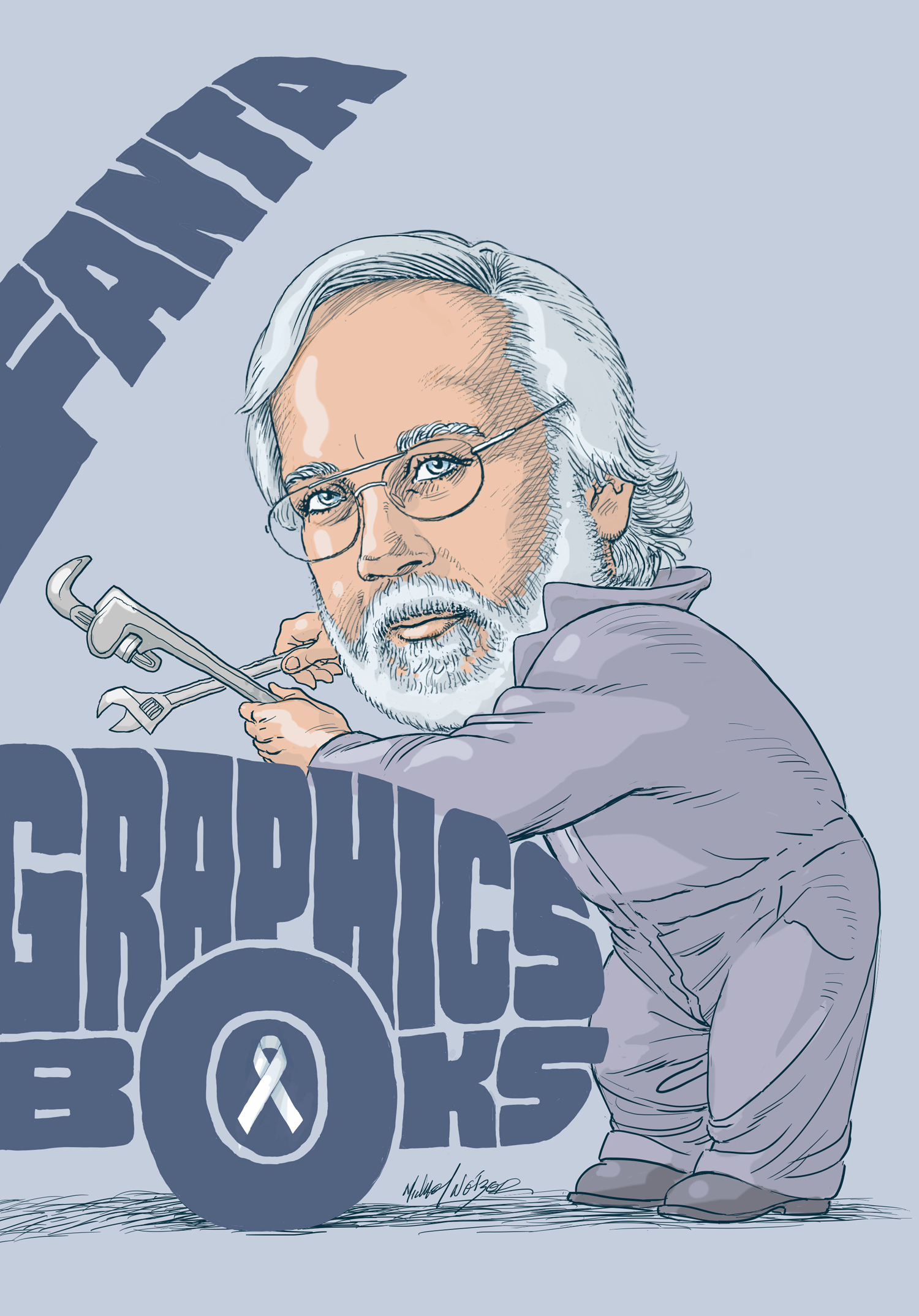
- Kim Thompson by Michael Netzer
- Born: September 25, 1956 Copenhagen, Denmark
- Died: June 19, 2013 (aged 56) Seattle, Washington, U.S.
- Areas: Editor, Publisher
- Notable works: The Comics Journal; Fantagraphics Books
- Awards: Inkpot Award (2001)
- Spouse: Lynn Emmert

Kim Thompson (September 25, 1956 – June 19, 2013) was an American comic book editor, translator, and publisher, best known as vice president and co-publisher of Seattle-based Fantagraphics Books. Along with co-publisher Gary Groth, Thompson used his position to further the cause of alternative comics in the American market. In addition, Thompson made it his business to bring the work of European cartoonists to American readers.

== Early life ==
Kim Thompson was born in Denmark in 1956. The child of a government contractor father, Thompson spent much of his youth in Europe, living in West Germany and the Netherlands. His mother was Danish; Thompson grew up speaking the language, a skill which aided his later career as a translator of European comic books. (He was also fluent in French.)

Thompson developed an interest in comics early in life, some of his favorites being the works of André Franquin, Maurice Tillieux, Jacques Tardi, and Jean "Mœbius" Giraud. As a young man, Thompson was a frequent contributor to American superhero comic book letter columns, with letters published in (among others) Amazing Spider-Man, Captain America, Conan the Barbarian, Incredible Hulk, Iron Man, Marvel Spotlight, and Marvel-Two-in-One. Early writing work by Thompson was published in the comics fanzine Omniverse fanzine in 1979.

== Career ==
=== Fantagraphics ===
Thompson moved to the United States in 1977, and soon met Groth through a mutual friend. He joined Fantagraphics' staff in that year, and soon became a co-owner with Groth. In 1978, Thompson saved Fantagraphics from bankruptcy by pouring his inheritance into the company's coffers.

Thompson was a regular contributor to the industry magazine The Comics Journal (which is published by Fantagraphics) since 1977. Although soft-spoken in person, as a writer Thompson did not shy from controversy. Even though he personally reviewed Dave Sim's long-running self-published comic Cerebus in early issues of The Comics Journal, Thompson (along with Groth) later took Sim to task in its pages for Sim's controversial statements about feminism and self-publishing.

Thompson was also a regular contributor to the (now defunct) Fantagraphics-published magazine Amazing Heroes, writing for that journal from 1981 to 1987.

Since Fantagraphics began publishing comics in 1982, Thompson edited many of the company's most popular titles, including Peter Bagge's Hate, Chris Ware's Acme Novelty Library, Joe Sacco's Palestine, Stan Sakai's Usagi Yojimbo, Linda Medley's Castle Waiting, and anthologies like Critters and Zero Zero.

Thompson's last major Fantagraphics release was a remastered and expanded new edition of Guy Peellaert's landmark graphic novel The Adventures of Jodelle (1966) for which Thompson also provided a new translation from the French.

==== Translator ====
A long-time champion of European comics, Thompson translated the work of a number of international cartoonists published by Fantagraphics, as well as material used in The Comics Journal. He was also the regular translator of the Ignatz Series co-published by Fantagraphics. Thompson described his translation work for Fantagraphics this way:

I translate pretty much every European foreign-language cartoonist we publish except for Matti Hagelberg who is Finnish (Finnish is well outside of my area of expertise). ... A more or less complete list of cartoonists whose comics I've worked on in the last couple years would be Nikoline Werdelin (Danish); Joost Swarte (Dutch); David B., Emile Bravo, Killoffer, Jacques Tardi, and Lewis Trondheim (French); Nicolas Mahler (German); Gabriella Giandelli, Igort, Leila Marzocchi, and Sergio Ponchione (Italian); Jason (Norwegian or French); Max (Spanish); and Martin Kellerman (Swedish). ... In case you're wondering, I don't actually speak all of those languages, but I can read them, more or less in some cases. ... Danish is my native language. Swedish and Norwegian are so close to Danish ... that with a little work any Dane can read them pretty well, as I do. I learned Spanish in high school and kept up with it. I lived for six years in Germany and also studied German in high school, so that stuck with me too. I lived for three years in Holland. Italian is my weakest language, I sort of plow my way through that thanks to French and Spanish and use of a dictionary—but all my Italian translations I always check with the authors anyway.

=== Illness and death ===
On March 6, 2013, Thompson announced he had lung cancer and was taking a leave of absence from Fantagraphics to pursue treatment. He died on June 19, 2013, at his home, at the age of 56, survived by his wife, Lynn Emmert, as well as his mother, father, and brother.

== Awards ==
Thompson was given an Inkpot Award in 2001.

He was a 1996 Will Eisner Comic Industry Awards nominee for Best Editor for The Acme Novelty Library, Palestine, and Zero Zero.

In early October 2021, Kim was posthumously awarded the inaugural Tom Spurgeon Award at the Cartoon Crossroads Columbus’ (CXC) seventh festival. Fellow awardees (both also posthumous) included syndicate manager Mollie Slott and All-Negro Comics founder and publisher Orrin C. Evans. The Tom Spurgeon Award is aimed at recognizing the role of non-cartoonists — living and deceased — in supporting the broader medium.

== Tributes ==
Comics journalist Tom Spurgeon:

. . . Thompson has worked the last several years transforming the longtime alternative comics company he co-owns into a small but potent comics, art book, and graphic novel publishing house. . . . [H]e has been one of North America's most effective advocates for translated books from the rich French-language tradition. He is also a talented editor, a fine interviewer . . . and generally informed and involved when it comes to all aspects of how that company functions. If Fantagraphics were a car, Kim would be the guy in the jumpsuit and dirty fingernails constantly poking around under its hood.

Comics critic R. Fiore:

If he had told you 36 years ago that he would one day be the publisher of Robert Crumb, Charles Schulz, Walt Kelly, Carl Barks, Harvey Kurtzman, Will Elder, Hergé, Jacques Tardi, and EC Comics, together with much of the Mount Rushmore of a comics era yet undreamed of, you would have said, "Will this be before or after you've laid all the Dallas Cowboy cheerleaders?" ... And yet it all came to pass. Above all, creatively speaking, his loss will be a terrible blow to French comics in English. ... Where even the best translations of comics French, up to and including the renowned work of Anthea Bell and Derek Hockridge on Asterix, will come out somewhat stilted, Kim's come off as idiomatic and natural English. If you were Fantagraphics this skill was just there, like water in the tap.

== Bibliography ==
- "Devoured By His Own Fantasies", introduction to Optimism of Youth: The Underground Work of Jack Jackson, Fantagraphics, 1991. (with Gary Groth)
- "Introduction". in Mézières, Jean-Claude and Christin, Pierre. Valerian: The New Future Trilogy. New York: iBooks (2004). pp. 1–2. ISBN 0-7434-8674-9.

=== Translated works ===
- B, David, 2011. The armed garden and other stories. Fantagraphics Books, Seattle, WA.
- B, David, 2006a. Babel. 2 2. Fantagraphics Books; Coconino Press, Seattle; [Bologna].
- B, David, 2006b. Epileptic. Pantheon Books, New York.
- B, David, MacOrlan, P., 2010. The littlest pirate king. Fantagraphics; Turnaround [distributor], Seattle, Wash.; London.
- Blanquet, 2010. Toys in the basement. Fantagraphics, Seattle, Wash.
- Corona, M., 2007a. Reflections. 2. Fantagraphics Books; Coconino Press, Seattle; [Bologna].
- Corona, M., 2007b. Reflections. 3. Fantagraphics Books; Coconino Press, Seattle; [Bologna].
- Corona, M., 2006. Reflections. 1. Fantagraphics Books; Coconino Press, Seattle; [Bologna].
- Forest, J.-C., Tardi, J., Kusa, B., Lees, G., 2009. You are There. Fantagraphics Books, Seattle, WA.
- Franquin, A., 2013. Franquin's Last Laugh. Fantagraphics Books.
- Franquin, Jidéhem, Greg, M., 1995. Z is for Zorglub. Fantasy Flight Pub., [United States].
- Ghermandi, F., 2005. Grenuord. 1 1. Fantagraphics, Seattle, Wash.
- Ghermandi, F., 2003. The wipeout. Fantagraphics, Seattle, WA.
- Giandelli, G., 2012. Interiorae, 1 edition. ed. Fantagraphics, Seattle, Wash.; London.
- Gipi, 2006. They found the car. Fantagraphics, Seattle, WA.
- Gipi, 2005. Wish you were here. 1, 1,. Fantagraphics Books; Coconino Press, Seattle; [Bologna].
- Igort, 2008. Baobab 3. Fantagraphics Books; Coconino Press, Seattle; [Bologna].
- Igort, 2006. Baobab 2. Fantagraphics Books; Coconino Press, Seattle; [Bologna].
- Igort, 2005. Baobab 1. Fantagraphics Books; Coconino Press, Seattle, WA; [Bologna, Italy?].
- Jason, 2013. Lost Cat.
- Jason, 2011. Athos in America.
- Jason, 2010. What I did. Fantagraphics Books; Distributed in the U.S. by W.W. Norton, Seattle, WA; [New York].
- Jason, 2009a. Almost silent. Fantagraphics Books, Seattle.
- Jason, 2009b. Low moon. Fantagraphics Books; Distributed in the U.S. by W.W. Norton, Seattle, WA; [New York].
- Jason, 2008a. Pocket full of rain: and other stories. Fantagraphics Books, Seattle, Wash.
- Jason, 2008b. The Left Bank gang. Fantagraphics Books, Seattle, Wash. - Winner of the Eisner Award for Best U.S. Edition of International Material Award in 2007 "The Eisner Awards". Comic Con San Diego. 2 December 2012. Archived from the original on 6 October 2014.
- Jason, 2007. The last musketeer. Fantagraphics Books, Seattle, WA. - Winner of the Eisner Best U.S. Edition of International Material Award in 2009 "The Eisner Awards". Comic Con San Diego. 2 December 2012. Archived from the original on 6 October 2014.
- Jason, 2006a. Meow, baby! Fantagraphics, Seattle, Wash.
- Jason, 2006b. The Living and the Dead.
- Jason, 2005. Why are you doing this? Fantagraphics, Seattle, Wash.
- Jason, 2004. You can't get there from here. Fantagraphics Books, Seattle.
- Jason, 2001. Hey, wait--. Fantagraphics Books, Seattle, WA.
- Jason, Elvestad, S., 2003. The iron wagon. Fantagraphics Books, Seattle, Wash.
- Kellerman, M., 2005a. Rocky 1. Fantagraphics; Turnaround [distributor], Seattle, Wash.; London.
- Kellerman, M., 2005b. Rocky 2. Fantagraphics, Seattle, Wash.
- Kellerman, M., 2005c. Rocky 3. Fantagraphics, Seattle, Wash.
- Kellerman, M., 2005d. Rocky 4. Fantagraphics, Seattle, Wash.
- Lehmann, M., 2006. Hwy 115. Fantagraphics Books, Seattle, WA.
- Lopez, F.S., Lopez, G.S., 1991. Ana. Fantagraphics Books, Seattle, Wash.
- Macherot, R., 2011. Sibyl-Anne vs. Ratticus. Fantagraphics Books, Seattle, Wash.
- Mahler, 2012. Angelman: fallen angel. Fantagraphics; Turnaround [distributor], Seattle, Wash.; London.
- Manara, M., Fellini, F., Pisu, S., 2012a. The Manara library. Volume 3. Dark Horse Books, Milwaukie, Or.
- Manara, M., Orzechowski, T., Buhalis, L., 2013. The Manara library. Volume 4. Dark Horse; Diamond [distributor], Milwaukie, Or.; London.
- Manara, M., Pratt, H., 2011. The Manara library. Volume 1. Dark Horse Books, Milwaukie, Or. - Winner of the Eisner Best U.S. Edition of International Material Award in 2012 "The Eisner Awards". Comic Con San Diego. 2 December 2012. Archived from the original on 6 October 2014.
- Manara, M., Pratt, H., Milani, M., 2012b. The Manara library. Volume 2. Dark Horse Books, Milwaukie, Or.
- Martí, 2007. Calvario Hills. 1 1. Fantagraphics Books : Coconino Press, Seattle.
- Marzocchi, L., 2007. Niger # 2. Fantagraphics Books, Seattle, Wash.
- Marzocchi, L., 2006. Niger. Fantagraphics Books; Coconino Press, Seattle; [Bologna, Italy?].
- Mattotti, L., Piersanti, C., 2010. Stigmata. Fantagraphics; Turnaround [distributor], Seattle, WA; London.
- Mattotti, L., Zentner, J., 2012. The Crackle of the Frost, 1 edition. ed. Fantagraphics, Seattle, Wash.
- Max, 2006. Bardín the Superrealist: his deeds, his utterances, his exploits, and his perambulations. Fantagraphics Books, Seattle, WA.
- Peellaert, G., Bartier, P., Sterckx, P., 2013. The adventures of Jodelle.
- Schultheiss, M., 1992. Talk dirty. Eros Comix, Seattle, WA.
- Sokal, 1989. Shaggy dog story: from the files of Inspector Carnado. Rijperman / Fantagraphics, [France].
- Tardi, J., 2011. The Arctic Marauder. Fantagraphics Books, Seattle.
- Tardi, J., 2010a. It was the war of the trenches. Fantagraphics Books, Seattle. - Winner of the Eisner Best U.S. Edition of International Material Award in 2011 "The Eisner Awards". Comic Con San Diego. 2 December 2012. Archived from the original on 6 October 2014.
- Tardi, J., 2010b. The extraordinary adventures of Adele Blanc-Sec. [Volume] 1, [Volume] 1,. Fantagraphics Books; Distributed ... by W.W. Norton, Seattle, WA; [New York].
- Tardi, J., Legrand, B., Grange, D., 2012. New York Mon Amour, 1 edition. ed. Fantagraphics, Seattle, WA.
- Tardi, J., Malet, L., 2015. Fog over Tolbiac Bridge.
- Tardi, J., Manchette, J.-P., 2011. Like a sniper lining up his shot. Fantagraphics Books, Seattle, WA.
- Tardi, J., Manchette, J.-P., 2009. West coast blues. Fantagraphics Books; Distributed in the U.S. by W.W. Norton, Seattle, WA; [New York?].
- Tardi, J., Thompson, K., 2011. The extraordinary adventures of Adèle Blanc-Sec. The Mad Scientist and Mummies on Parade [Vol.] 2 [Vol.] 2. Fantagraphics Books; Distributed to bookstores in the U.S. by W.W. Norton, Seattle, Wash.; [New York].
- Tardi, J., Verney, J.-P., Dascher, H., 2013. Goddamn this war! Fantagraphics Books, Seattle, WA. - Winner of the Eisner Best U.S. Edition of International Material Award in 2014 "The Eisner Awards". Comic Con San Diego. 2 December 2012. Archived from the original on 6 October 2014.
- Trondheim, L., 2012. Ralph Azham. Volume 1. Fantagraphics; Turnaround [distributor], Seattle, Wash.; London.
- Trondheim, L., 1998. The Hoodoodad. Fantagraphics, Seattle, WA.
- Trondheim, L., 1997. Harum scarum. Fantagraphics Books, Seattle, WA.
- Vehlmann, F., Jason, Hubert, 2011. Isle of 100,000 graves. Fantagraphics Books, Seattle, WA.
