= Christopher Frank =

British-born French writer and director

Christopher Frank (5 December 1942, Beaconsfield, Buckinghamshire, UK – 20 November 1993, Paris, France) was a British-born French writer, screenwriter, and film director. He won the 1972 Prix Renaudot for his novel La Nuit américaine that served the basis for Andrzej Zulawski's film That Most Important Thing: Love.

== Awards ==
- 1967: Prix Hermès de Littérature for Mortelle
- 1972: Prix Renaudot for La Nuit américaine

== Works ==
=== Screenwriter ===
- 1974 Le Mouton enragé Michel Deville
- 1975 That Most Important Thing: Love Andrzej Zulawski
- 1977 Les Passagers Serge Leroy
- 1977 Attention, les enfants regardent Serge Leroy
- 1977 L'Homme pressé Édouard Molinaro
- 1979 Memoirs of a French Whore Daniel Duval
- 1979 Clair de femme Costa-Gavras
- 1980 Trois hommes à abattre Jacques Deray
- 1981 Eaux profondes Michel Deville
- 1981 Josepha Christopher Frank
- 1981 Pour la peau d'un flic Alain Delon
- 1981 Une étrange affaire Pierre Granier-Deferre
- 1983 Le Battant Alain Delon
- 1983 Femmes de personnes Christopher Frank
- 1983 L'Année des méduses (Year of the Jellyfish) Christopher Frank
- 1983 L'Ami de Vincent Pierre Granier-Deferre
- 1986 Cours privé Pierre Granier-Deferre
- 1987 Malone, un tueur en enfer Harley Cokeliss
- 1987 Spirales Christopher Frank
- 1993 Elles n'oublient jamais Christopher Frank

=== Dialogue ===
- 1980 Trois hommes à abattre by Jacques Deray
- 1981 Pour la peau d'un flic by Alain Delon

=== Film director ===
- 1982: Josepha
- 1984: Femmes de personne
- 1984: L'Année des méduses
- 1987: Spirale
- 1994: Elles n'oublient jamais
