= Robin Davis (director) =

French film director

- Born: 29 March 1943 (age 83); Marseille, France
- Occupations: Film director; screenwriter
- Years active: 1975–2006

Robin Davis (born 29 March 1943) is a French film director and screenwriter.

== Filmography ==
- 1974: Cher Victor
- 1979: The Police War
- 1982: Le Choc
- 1983: J'ai épousé une ombre
- 1985: Hors-la-loi
- 1989: La Fille des collines
- 2016: Le Chapeau de Mitterrand (The President's Hat)

== Television ==
(selective listing)

- 1998: Les rives du Paradis
- 2006: Jeanne Poisson, marquise de Pompadour
- 2008: Disparitions
- 2009: Bas les cœurs
