= Dominique Fabre (novelist) =

- Born: 30 June 1929; Geneva, Switzerland
- Died: 20 December 2010 (aged 81); Pfeffikon, Switzerland
- Occupations: screenwriter, novelist, journalist
- Known for: Un Beau Monstre

Dominique Fabre (French pronunciation: [dɔminik fabʁ]; 30 June 1929 – 20 December 2010) was a Swiss screenwriter and novelist. His book Un Beau Monstre received the Grand Prix de Littérature Policière in 1968. He is not to be confused with the current French author Dominique Fabre.

Fabre started his career as a journalist before becoming a screenwriter. He most frequently worked with film director Étienne Périer. Fabre also wrote three crime novels in the late 1960s and early 1970s. Later in his life, he wrote mostly for television.

Fabre died in Pfeffikon on 20 December 2010, at the age of 81.

== Bibliography ==
- Suisse (1955) - non-fiction; published in English as Switzerland (1961, London : Vista Books; New York : Viking)
- Un Beau Monstre (1968)
- La Tête en feu (1971)
- Un Meurtre est un Meurtre (1972)

== Filmography ==
- 1957 : Charming Boys, directed by Henri Decoin
- 1959 : Bobosse, directed by Étienne Périer
- 1960 : Meurtre en 45 tours, directed by Étienne Périer
- 1961 : Quai Notre-Dame, directed by Jacques Berthier
- 1962 : Le Mercenaire (La Congiura dei dieci), co-directed by Baccio Bandini and Étienne Périer
- 1967 : Des garçons et des filles, directed by Étienne Périer
- 1968 : Le Rouble à deux faces, directed by Étienne Périer
- 1971 : Macédoine, directed by Jacques Scandelari
- 1971 : Un beau monstre, directed by Sergio Gobbi
- 1972 : Un meurtre est un meurtre, directed by Étienne Périer
- 1974 : La Main à couper, directed by Étienne Périer
- 1977 : Servante et Maîtresse, directed by Bruno Gantillon
- 1977 : L'Animal, directed by Claude Zidi
- 1978 : La Part du feu, directed by Étienne Périer
