= Valérie Mairesse =

French stage and film actress (born 1954)

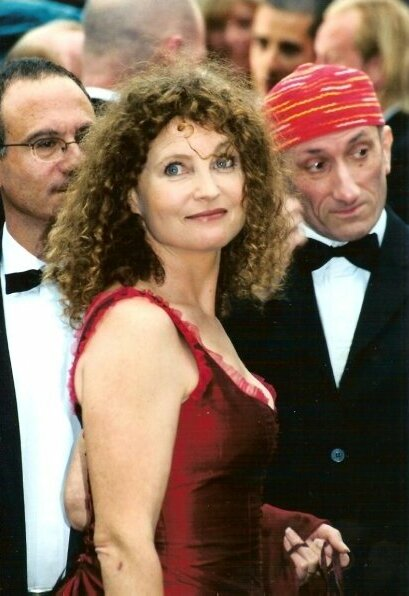
- Mairesse in 2001
- Born: 8 June 1954 (age 72); Paris, France
- Occupation: Actress
- Years active: 1975–present

Valérie Mairesse (born 8 June 1954) is a French stage and film actress. She was nominated for the César Awards 1978 for Best Supporting Actress for her role in Repérages.

== Theater ==
| Year | Title | Author | Director | Notes |
|---|---|---|---|---|
| 1975 | Ma tête est malade | Le Splendid | Le Splendid | |
| 1981 | Bunny’s bar | Josiane Balasko | Josiane Balasko | |
| 1985 | The Baker's Wife | Marcel Pagnol | Jérôme Savary | |
| 1988 | The Ex-Wife of My Life | Josiane Balasko | Josiane Balasko (2) | |
| 1989 | Le Bourgeois gentilhomme | Molière | Jérôme Savary (2) | |
| 1993 | Le Prix Martin | Eugène Labiche | Daniel Benoin | |
| 1993 | Quadrille | Sacha Guitry | Daniel Benoin (2) | |
| 1995 | Rendez-vous | Neil Simon | Raymond Acquaviva | |
| 1997 | La Surprise de l'amour | Pierre de Marivaux | Robert Fortune | Nominated - Molière Award for Best Supporting Actress |
| 1999 | Loving Sabotage | Amélie Nothomb | Annabelle Milot | |
| 1999 | The Imaginary Invalid | Molière | François Bourcier | |
| 2004 | Feydeau c'est fou ! | Georges Feydeau | François Tilly | |
| 2005 | The Vagina Monologues | Eve Ensler | Isabelle Rattier | |
| 2006 | Nuit blanche | Gérald Aubert | Gildas Bourdet | |
| 2009 | Chat en poche | Georges Feydeau | Pierre Laville | |
| 2011 | The Vagina Monologues | Eve Ensler | Isabelle Rattier | |
| 2011-13 | Pouic-Pouic | Jean Girault & Jacques Vilfrid | Lionnel Astier | |
| 2014 | Romeo and Juliet | William Shakespeare | Nicolas Briançon | Nominated - Molière Award for Best Supporting Actress |
| 2015 | Partie en Grèce | Willy Russell | Marie-Pascale Osterrieth | |
| 2016 | Ma mère est un panda | Willy Liechty | Didier Brengarth | |

== Filmography ==
| Year | Title | Role | Director | Notes |
|---|---|---|---|---|
| 1975 | Adieu poulet | The rosettes girl | Pierre Granier-Deferre | |
| 1975 | 7 morts sur ordonnance | | Jacques Rouffio | |
| 1975 | L'agression | Natacha | Gérard Pirès | |
| 1975 | Le bol d'air | Valérie | Charles Nemes | Short |
| 1976 | Calmos | Claudine | Bertrand Blier | |
| 1976 | On aura tout vu | Pierrette | Georges Lautner | |
| 1976 | Andréa | The doctor's maid | Henri Glaeser | |
| 1976 | Plaisir d'amour en Iran | | Agnès Varda | Short |
| 1977 | Repérages | Esther | Michel Soutter | Nominated - César Award for Best Supporting Actress |
| 1977 | Rene the Cane | Martine | Francis Girod | |
| 1977 | One Sings, the Other Doesn't | Pauline | Agnès Varda (2) | |
| 1977 | Les loulous | Marie | Patrick Cabouat | |
| 1977 | Emmenez-moi au Ritz | Etiennette | Pierre Grimblat | TV movie |
| 1978 | Haro | Marie | Gilles Béhat | |
| 1978 | Dora et la lanterne magique | Valentine | Pascal Kané | |
| 1978 | Une épouse romantique | | Robert Réa | Short |
| 1979 | Un si joli village | Muriel Olivier | Étienne Périer | |
| 1979 | Histoires insolites | Constance | Pierre Granier-Deferre (2) | TV series (1 episode) |
| 1980 | The Umbrella Coup | Sylvette | Gérard Oury | |
| 1980 | C'est pas moi, c'est lui | Valérie | Pierre Richard | |
| 1981 | Si ma gueule vous plaît... | Catherine | Michel Caputo | |
| 1982 | Deux heures moins le quart avant Jésus-Christ | A prostitute | Jean Yanne | |
| 1982 | Jimmy Jazz | BB | Laurent Perrin | Short |
| 1983 | Banzaï | Isabelle Parisse | Claude Zidi | |
| 1983 | Debout les crabes, la mer monte! | Mademoiselle | Jean-Jacques Grand-Jouan | |
| 1983 | Croquignole | Mme Fernande | Jean Brard | TV movie |
| 1984 | Les fauves | Juliette | Jean-Louis Daniel | |
| 1984 | La triche | Marilyn | Yannick Bellon | |
| 1985 | Gros dégueulasse | The car's girl | Bruno Zincone | |
| 1985 | Un homme comblé | Nelly | Paula Delsol | TV movie |
| 1985 | L'ordre | Germaine | Étienne Périer (2) | TV movie |
| 1986 | The Sacrifice | Julia | Andrei Tarkovsky | |
| 1986 | The Joint Brothers | Brigitte | Hervé Palud | |
| 1987 | Funny Boy | Flo | Christian Le Hémonet | |
| 1989 | Rouge Venise | Célia | Étienne Périer (3) | |
| 1989 | Mary de Cork | Oona | Robin Davis | TV movie |
| 1989 | Le masque | Dora Eichart | Jacques Ordines | TV series (1 episode) |
| 1989 | Juliette en toutes lettres | | Gérard Marx | TV series (1 episode) |
| 1989 | Les pique-assiettes | | | TV series (1 episode) |
| 1990 | L'ex-femme de ma vie | Véro's voice | Josée Dayan | TV movie |
| 1990 | La vierge noire | Coco | Igaal Niddam | TV mini-series |
| 1990 | Le Gorille | Honorée | Jean Delannoy | TV series (1 episode) |
| 1991 | Les secrets professionnels du Dr Apfelglück | Astrée | Stéphane Clavier, Thierry Lhermitte, ... | |
| 1991 | Amelia Lópes O'Neill | Ginette | Valeria Sarmiento | |
| 1991 | L'entraînement du champion avant la course | Loren | Bernard Favre | |
| 1991 | Le Lyonnais | Lita | Claude Grinberg | TV series (1 episode) |
| 1992 | Ville à vendre | Elmire | Jean-Pierre Mocky | |
| 1992 | Sup de fric | Isabelle | Christian Gion | |
| 1992 | Les cravates léopards | Marie-Cécile Mesange | Jean-Luc Trotignon | TV movie |
| 1992 | Les Cordier, juge et flic | Martine Barbier | Alain Bonnot | TV series (1 episode) |
| 1993 | Dose mortelle | | Joyce Buñuel | TV movie |
| 1993 | Anges ou démons? | Marthe | Pierre Aknine | TV movie |
| 1996 | Titane | Zita | Daniel Moosmann | TV movie |
| 1997 | Baby-sitter Blues | Sylvie | Williams Crépin | TV movie |
| 1998 | La dame aux camélias | Prudence | Jean-Claude Brialy | TV movie |
| 1998 | Médecins de nuit | | | TV series |
| 1999 | La vie ne me fait pas peur | | Noémie Lvovsky | |
| 2000 | Confort moderne | Rosa | Dominique Choisy | |
| 2001 | A Crime in Paradise | Magali | Jean Becker | |
| 2001 | Mère de toxico | Hélène | Lucas Belvaux | TV movie |
| 2002 | Un couple épatant | Claire | Lucas Belvaux (2) | |
| 2002 | Après la vie | Claire | Lucas Belvaux (3) | |
| 2002 | Mi-temps | Rosa | Mathias Gokalp | Short |
| 2002 | Froid comme l'été | Elizabeth | Jacques Maillot | TV movie |
| 2002 | L'envolé | Mercedes | Philippe Venault | TV movie |
| 2002 | Une maison dans la tempête | Natacha | Christiane Lehérissey | TV movie |
| 2002 | Commissariat Bastille | Gina Paoli | Jean-Marc Seban | TV series (1 episode) |
| 2004 | Si c'est ça la famille | Dora Colona | Peter Kassovitz | TV movie |
| 2004 | Moitié-moitié | Françoise Hornoy | Laurent Firode | TV movie |
| 2004 | Le Miroir de l'eau | Jeanne | Edwin Baily | TV mini-series |
| 2004 | Femmes de loi | Georgia Duval | Denis Malleval | TV series (1 episode) |
| 2005 | L'évangile selon Aîmé | Patricia | André Chandelle | TV movie |
| 2006 | Chacun sa nuit | Agnès | Jean-Marc Barr & Pascal Arnold | |
| 2006 | La blonde au bois dormant | Geneviève Volland | Sébastien Grall | TV movie |
| 2007 | The Merry Widow | Nicole | Isabelle Mergault | |
| 2007 | Michou d'Auber | Monique | Thomas Gilou | |
| 2007 | La promeneuse d'oiseaux | Émilie | Jacques Otmezguine | TV movie |
| 2007 | Les camarades | Jackie | François Luciani | TV mini-series |
| 2007 | Louis Page | Bella | Philippe Roussel | TV series (1 episode) |
| 2008 | A Day at the Museum | Thérèse | Jean-Michel Ribes | |
| 2008 | La saison des orphelins | Claudie | David Tardé | |
| 2008 | Sa raison d'être | Mado | Renaud Bertrand | TV movie |
| 2008 | Un souvenir | Madame Trump | Jacques Renard | TV movie |
| 2008 | Terre de lumière | Flora | Stéphane Kurc | TV mini-series |
| 2008 | Palizzi | | Jean Dujardin | TV series (1 episode) |
| 2010-12 | Nouvelle Maud | Ghislaine Neveur | Bernard Malaterre & Régis Musset | TV series (12 episodes) |
| 2011 | You Will Be My Son | Madeleine Amelot | Gilles Legrand | |
| 2011 | Le grand restaurant II | The police inspector | Gérard Pullicino | TV movie |
| 2011 | Week-end chez les Toquées | Sabine Leguelec | Emmanuel Jeaugey & Laurence Katrian | TV series (1 episode) |
| 2012 | Par amour | Martine | Laurent Firode (2) | |
| 2012 | Toussaint Louverture | Mother Coulinge | Philippe Niang | TV mini-series |
| 2013 | La vie sans truc | | Anne-Laure Daffis & Léo Marchand | Short |
| 2013 | Profilage | Christine Jullian | Julien Despaux | TV series (1 episode) |
| 2014 | Brèves de comptoir | Madame Pelton | Jean-Michel Ribes (2) | |
| 2014 | Scènes de ménages | Solange | Francis Duquet | TV series (1 episode) |
| 2017 | A 2 heures de Paris | Antoinette | Virginie Verrier | |
