= The French Detective =

- Film poster
- Directed by: Pierre Granier-Deferre
- Screenplay by: Francis Veber
- Based on: Adieu poulet! by Jean Laborde
- Produced by: Georges Dancigers
- Starring: Lino Ventura; Patrick Dewaere; Victor Lanoux; Françoise Brion; Claude Rich; Julien Guiomar
- Cinematography: Jean Collomb
- Edited by: Jean Ravel
- Music by: Philippe Sarde
- Production companies: Les Films Ariane; Mondex Films
- Distributed by: Compagnie Commerciale Française Cinématographique
- Release date: 10 December 1975
- Running time: 91 minutes
- Country: France
- Language: French

The French Detective (French: Adieu poulet) is a 1975 French film directed by Pierre Granier-Deferre, and scripted by Francis Veber from the 1974 novel Adieu poulet ! by Raf Vallet. It received two César nominations for best supporting actor, and another for best editing.

== Plot ==
Despite the English title, in truth there are two French detectives, based in Rouen. Verjeat is an aging, been-around gumshoe, while Lefevre is his young, callow and cynical associate. The two detectives don't like each other much at first, but this will change. Their current assignment is getting the goods on a corrupt politician. During an election, there is a fight between the supporters of two of the candidates. In the melee political thugs murder an opponent's volunteer and also kill a cop. The officer has time to warn his colleagues that the killer is Portor, a well known thug whose brother is campaigning on behalf of law and order candidate Lardatte. Chief inspector Verjeat believes the politician who hired the thugs is as guilty as the murderous goon. His pursuit of Portor is hampered by Lardatte, for whom he has a personal dislike and misses no opportunity to humiliate. Verjeat's pursuit of Lardatte gets him a warning from his superiors. When he embarrasses Lardatte while disarming a hostage (the dead volunteer's father), Verjeat is told he's being promoted and transferred within a week to a posting outside of Rouen. This will take him off the case. As a result, he then finds himself with a very short time to capture Portor. Verjeat is sure that his upcoming transfer is courtesy of Lardatte and his police contacts. He speeds up his hunt for the goon and, with Lefevre, he engineers a complicated scheme to buy more time before the transfer.

== Cast ==
- Lino Ventura as Verjeat
- Patrick Dewaere as Lefevre
- Victor Lanoux as Pierre Lardatte
- Julien Guiomar as commissioner Ledoux
- Claude Rich as Judge Delmesse
- Pierre Tornade as Pignol
- Claude Brosset as Portor
- Jean Collomb as the barman
- Dominique Zardi as a patient
- Henri Attal as a gangster
- Valérie Mairesse as The rosettes girl

== Production ==
Jean Laborde second novel titled Adieu poulet! (lit. 'So Long, Copper!') under the alias of Raf Vallet was published on 26 July 1974. On 24 September 1974, Alexandre Dancigers and Alexandre Mnouchkine of Les Films Ariane bought the rights to the book for 500,000 francs and hired the author to adapt it into a screenplay. The producers offered the film project to actor Lino Ventura who agreed to it but disagreed to the suggested director and suggested Pierre Granier-Deferre.

Laborde's script did not appeal to Ventura who kept telling the writer "Lino doesn't get bought by a whore" as Verjeat received a few gifts from a woman in the film. Veber had to rewrite the script and later wrote in his memoirs that he had to keep "doing acrobatics to keep Lino honest, and I think that the version he shot is definitely not as good as the one he refused."

The French Detective was a French production from two Paris-based studios: Les Films Ariane and Mondex Films.

Filming took place in Rouen.

== Release ==
The French Detective was released in France on 9 December 1975. It had 1,945,659 spectators in France and was 18th place in the annual box office.

It was released in New York on 11 March 1979.

== Reception ==
When released outside France, the film received mixed reviews. The authors of French Thrillers of the 1970s: Volume I, Crime Films said that some critics thought the story was too familiar and that Patrick Dewaere was miscast. A review in the New York Times said that the actor "who plays a man who's supposed to be in his mid-30s, behaves as if he hadn't yet made his first communion. I think he means to be cute.
