= Andréa Ferréol =

French actress

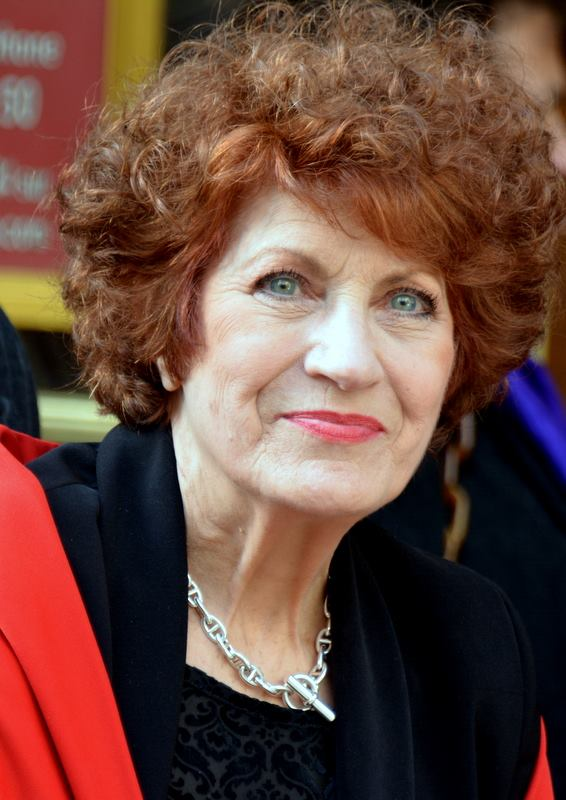
- Ferréol in 2014
- Born: 6 January 1947 (age 79); Aix-en-Provence, France
- Occupation: Actress
- Years active: 1967–present

Andréa Ferréol (born Andrée Louise Ferréol; 6 January 1947) is a French actress and officer of the Ordre national du Mérite (2009).

Her debut was in the 1973 film La Grande bouffe, which made a big scandal at the Cannes Film Festival.

== Theater ==
Year	Title	Author	Director
1967	Silence, l’arbre remue encore	François Billetdoux	Antoine Bourseiller
1968	Rupture	André Roussin	Jean-Laurent Cochet
1969	Le Lai de Barabbas	Fernando Arrabal	Jean-Michel Ribes
1970	Les Fraises musclées	Jean-Michel Ribes	Jean-Michel Ribes
1971	Turandot	Bertolt Brecht	Georges Wilson
1972	Crime and Punishment	Fyodor Dostoevsky	André Barsacq
1972-73	Romeo and Juliet	William Shakespeare	Robert Hossein
1974	Turandot	Carlo Gozzi & Giacomo Puccini	Lucian Pintilie
1978	Les gens déraisonnables sont en voie de disparition	Peter Handke	Claude Régy
1981	The Death of Ivan Ilyich	Leo Tolstoy	Simone Benmussa
1986-87	La Valse du hasard	Victor Haïm	Stéphan Meldegg
1996	En cas de meurtre	Joyce Carol Oates	Lucienne Hamon
2001	Transferts	Jean-Pierre About	Jean-Claude Idée
2002	Les Conquérantes	Gérard Bagardie	Claude Confortès
2005-07	The Vagina Monologues	Eve Ensler	Isabelle Rattier
2007-08	Vacances de rêve	Francis Joffo	Francis Joffo
2009	The Birthday Party	Harold Pinter	Michel Fagadau
2009	The Vagina Monologues	Eve Ensler	Isabelle Rattier & Caroline Loeb
2010	R.E.R.	Jean-Marie Besset	Gilbert Désveaux
2011	The Vagina Monologues	Eve Ensler	Isabelle Rattier
2013	La Véritable Histoire de Maria Callas	Jean-Yves Rogale	Raymond Acquaviva
2014	Quatre minutes	Chris Kraus	Jean-Luc Revol
2020	Très chère Mandy	Erwin Zirmi	Vincent Messager
2023	Maddie	Corinne Roehrig & Nycole Pouchoulin	Paul Chariéras
2022-23	Très chère Mandy	Erwin Zirmi	Vincent Messager
2022-23	La Priapée des écrevisses	Christian Siméon	Vincent Messager

== Filmography ==
=== Cinema ===
Year	Title	Role	Director	Notes
1971	Laisse aller... c'est une valse	uncredited	Georges Lautner	
1972	La Scoumoune	The angry prostitute	José Giovanni	
1973	La Grande Bouffe	Andrea	Marco Ferreri	
1973	La raison du plus fou		François Reichenbach	
1973	The Day of the Jackal	Hotel Staff	Fred Zinnemann	
1973	Les gants blancs du diable		László Szabó	
1973	Elle court, elle court la banlieue	A patient	Gérard Pirès	
1974	Ante Up	The singer	Paolo Nuzzi	
1974	Donna è bello	Ottavia	Sergio Bazzini	
1974	The Infernal Trio	Noemie	Francis Girod	
1975	Cookies	Madame Liquois	Joël Séria	
1975	I baroni	Mariantonia	Giampaolo Lomi	
1975	Incorrigible	Tatiana Negulesco	Philippe de Broca	
1975	L'ammazzatina	Maria Camerò	Ignazio Dolce	
1975	Serious as Pleasure	The lady in white	Robert Benayoun	
1975	Le futur aux trousses	Odette	Dolorès Grassian	
1975	Speak to Me of Love	The neighbor	Michel Drach	
1975	Vergine e di nome Maria	Maddalena	Sergio Nasca	
1976	Submission	Juliette	Salvatore Samperi	
1976	Goldflocken	Andréa / Marie	Werner Schroeter	
1976	Marie-poupée	Ida Courtin	Joël Séria	
1976	Soldier of Fortune	Leonora	Pasquale Festa Campanile	
1976	Tell Me You Do Everything for Me	Miriam Spinacroce	Pasquale Festa Campanile	
1976	Goodnight, Ladies and Gentlemen	Edvige	Leonardo Benvenuti, Ettore Scola, ...	
1977	Ligabue	Cesarina	Salvatore Nocita	
1977	Casanova & Co.	The Baker's Wife	Franz Antel	
1977	L'uomo di Corleone		Duilio Coletti	
1977	Servant and Mistress	Maria	Bruno Gantillon	
1978	Despair	Lydia Hermann	Rainer Werner Fassbinder	
1978	Mysteries	Kamma	Paul de Lussanet	
1978	L'amant de poche	Suzanne Chaput	Bernard Queysanne	
1978	Travolto dagli affetti familiari	Isotta	Mauro Severino	
1978	La grande crue de 1910	Narrator	Frédéric Compain	Short
1979	Milo Milo	Aphrodite	Nicos Perakis	
1979	Improvviso	Anna	Edith Bruck	
1979	The Tin Drum	Lina Greff	Volker Schlöndorff	
1979	Lovers and Liars	Noemi	Mario Monicelli	
1980	The Last Metro	Arlette Guillaume	François Truffaut	
1980	Retour à Marseille	Cécé	René Allio	
1980	Il cappotto di Astrakan	Maria Lenormand	Marco Vicario	
1980	L'Empreinte des géants	Germaine Hansen	Robert Enrico	
1980	The Orchestra Conductor		Andrzej Wajda	
1981	L'ombre rouge	Magda	Jean-Louis Comolli	
1981	Three Brothers	Raffaele's Wife	Francesco Rosi	
1982	Le crime d'amour	Cameo	Guy Gilles	
1982	The Girl from Trieste	Stefanutti	Pasquale Festa Campanile	
1982	That Night in Varennes	Adélaïde Gagnon	Ettore Scola	
1982	Y a-t-il un Français dans la salle?	Georgette Réglisson	Jean-Pierre Mocky	
1983	Le Battant	Sylviane Chabry	Alain Delon	
1983	Balles perdues	Maryvonne	Jean-Louis Comolli	
1983	Le prix du danger	Élisabeth Worms	Yves Boisset	
1984	The Twin	Evie	Yves Robert	
1984	Louisiana	Mignette	Philippe de Broca	
1984	The Judge	Regine Sauvat	Philippe Lefebvre	
1984	Aldo et Junior	Fernande	Patrick Schulmann	
1985	A Zed & Two Noughts	Alba Bewick	Peter Greenaway	
1985	The Two Lives of Mattia Pascal	Silvia Caporale	Mario Monicelli	
1986	Douce France	Marthe Maurin	François Chardeaux	
1986	Suivez mon regard	The baker	Jean Curtelin	
1987	Control	Rosy Bloch	Giuliano Montaldo	
1987	Promis... juré!	Dora	Jacques Monnet	
1987	Noyade interdite	Cora	Pierre Granier-Deferre	
1988	Una botta di vita	Germaine	Enrico Oldoini	
1988	Laggiù nella giungla	Emma	Stefano Reali	
1988	Corentin, ou Les infortunes conjugales	Athénaïs	Jean Marboeuf	
1989	Francesco	Francesco's mother	Liliana Cavani	
1989	Rouge Venise	Princess Hortense	Étienne Périer	
1989	The Sleazy Uncle	Teresa	Franco Brusati	
1989	Street of No Return	Rhoda	Samuel Fuller	
1990	Wings of Fame	Theresa	Otakar Votocek	
1990	Le cri du lézard	Clo	Bertrand Theubet	
1992	Il maestro	Dolores	Marion Hänsel	
1992	The True Story About Men and Women	Karla	Robert van Ackeren	
1993	Off Season	Miss Gabriel	Daniel Schmid	
1993	Sweet Killing	Louise Cross	Eddy Matalon	
1993	O Fio do Horizonte	Francesca	Fernando Lopes	
1994	Tzaleket		Haim Bouzaglo	
1994	Domenica	Anna Niehoff	Peter Kern	
1994	The Emperor's New Clothes	Duchess	Juraj Herz	
1995	One Hundred and One Nights	The astonished	Agnès Varda	
1996	Lucky Punch	Georgette	Dominique Ladoge	
1996	La vida privada	Marta	Vicente Pérez Herrero	
1996	I'm Crazy About Iris Blond	Marguerite Altidore	Carlo Verdone	
1997	El Chicko	Martha	David Rühm	
1997	Les couleurs du diable	Sherri	Alain Jessua	
1999	One 4 All	Queen of the Night	Claude Lelouch	
1999	No respires: El amor está en el aire	Lidia	Joan Potau	
2000	Bellyful	Loretta	Melvin Van Peebles	
2000	Winney, a Cute Candidate	Clara Montana	Florence Deygas & Olivier Kuntzel	Short
2001	La boîte	Monique	Claude Zidi	
2001	Le bal des pantins	Blanche	Herman Van Eyken	
2004	Brides	Emine	Pantelis Voulgaris	
2004	Le p'tit curieux	Dame Poulet	Jean Marboeuf	
2004	Madame Édouard	The butcher	Nadine Monfils	
2004	Le cadeau d'Elena	Barberine	Frédéric Graziani	
2006	The United States of Albert	Jane Pickford	André Forcier	
2006	Quand les anges s'en mêlent...	The mother	Crystel Amsalem	
2006	Perds pas la boule!	Iris	Maria Pia Crapanzano	Short
2007	Ma vie n'est pas une comédie romantique	Thomas's mother	Marc Gibaja	
2008	Ça se soigne?	Hélène	Laurent Chouchan	
2008	Dirty money, l'infiltré	Emeline Girard	Dominique Othenin-Girard	
2012	Shakki	Clothilde	Julien Landais	Short
2012	Ceux d'en haut	Voice	Izu Troin	Short
2014	Camellias	Danielle	Julien Landais	Short
2016	Saint-Amour	The breakfast woman	Benoît Delépine & Gustave Kervern	
2017	Knock	Madame Rémy	Lorraine Lévy	
2017	The Royal Exchange	Princess Palatine	Marc Dugain	
2018	Emma Peeters	Bernadette	Nicole Palo	
2019	Just a Gigolo	Sophia	Olivier Baroux	
2020	Le coup de grâce	Mireille	Pierre Lazarus	Short
2022	Envol	Madame McKenzie	Frédéric Cerulli	
2022	Choeur de rockers	Irène	Luc Bricault & Ida Techer	
2023	Notre tout petit petit mariage	Yvette	Frédéric Quiring	
2023	Même pas mal	The great grandmother	Sarah Stern	Short

=== Television ===
Year	Title	Role	Director	Notes
1971	Les enquêtes du commissaire Maigret	Madame Ernie	Marcel Cravenne	TV series (1 episode)
1972	L'argent par les fenêtres	The grocer	Philippe Joulia	TV movie
1972	Pont dormant	Joséphine	Fernand Marzelle	TV series (5 episodes)
1974	Les bâtisseurs d'empire	Cruche	Jaime Jaimes	TV movie
1975	Cigalon	Madame Toffi	Georges Folgoas	TV movie
1977	Le passe-muraille	The Lady	Pierre Tchernia	TV movie
1979	La stratégie du serpent	Marie Servant	Yves Boisset	TV movie
1979	Martin Eden	Maria	Giacomo Battiato	TV mini-series
1981	Au bon beurre	Juliette Poissonnard	Édouard Molinaro	TV movie
1982-83	Merci Bernard	Solange Picoud	Jean-Michel Ribes, Jean-Louis Fournier, ...	TV series (5 episodes)
1983	Great Performances	Mary	Luciano Salce	TV series (1 episode)
1984	Lucienne et le boucher	Lucienne	Pierre Tchernia	TV movie
1984	Cuore	Adriana	Luigi Comencini	TV mini-series
1984	Melodramma	Rossana	Sandro Bolchi	TV mini-series
1985	Sogni e bisogni	Fedora Tagliaferri	Sergio Citti	TV mini-series
1986	Les louves	Julia	Peter Duffell	TV movie
1987	Scacco matto	Luisa Honecker	Carlo Di Carlo	TV movie
1988	La garçonne	Claire Dumas	Étienne Périer	TV movie
1989	V comme vengeance	Joséphine	Claude Boissol	TV series (1 episode)
1989	Juliette en toutes lettres	Madame Pujols	Gérard Marx	TV series (1 episode)
1990	If the Shoe Fits	Wanda	Tom Clegg	TV movie
1990	Night of the Fox	Hélène de Ville	Charles Jarrott	TV movie
1990	L'invité clandestin	The hostess	Michel Mitrani	TV movie
1990	The Phantom of the Opera	Carlotta	Tony Richardson	TV mini-series
1991	Una famiglia in giallo		Luciano Odorisio	TV movie
1991	Die Väter des Nardino	Concetta	Wolf Gaudlitz	TV movie
1991	Piège pour femme seule	Lou	Gérard Marx	TV movie
1991	Le gorille	Diane Lapalud	Jean-Claude Sussfeld	TV series (1 episode)
1992	Un ballon dans la tête	Dolores	Michaëla Watteaux	TV movie
1993	La treizième voiture	Chloe Granval	Alain Bonnot	TV movie
1993	Maria des Eaux-Vives	Yvonne	Robert Mazoyer	TV mini-series
1993	Maigret	Mariette	Étienne Périer	TV series (1 episode)
1994	Cluedo	Madame Pervenche	Dominique Colonna, Stéphane Bertin, ...	TV mini-series
1995	La belle de Fontenay	Marion	Paule Zajdermann	TV movie
1995	Sandra princesse rebelle	Jacqueline Duplessis	Didier Albert	TV mini-series
1995	Zwei alte Hasen	Chantal Duroc	Stefan Bartmann	TV series (1 episode)
1997	Primo cittadino	Stefania	Gianfranco Albano	TV movie
1997	Mireille et Vincent	Jeanne	Jean-Louis Lorenzi	TV movie
1997	Somnia ou le voyage en hypnopompia	The black Queen	Hélène Guétary	TV movie
1998	Le sélec	Nicole	Jean-Claude Sussfeld	TV movie
1998	Mirage noir	Monique	Sébastien Grall	TV movie
1998	Heureusement qu'on s'aime	Simone	David Delrieux	TV movie
1999	Doppio segreto		Marcello Cesena	TV mini-series
1999	Premier de cordée	Marie Servettaz	Pierre-Antoine Hiroz & Édouard Niermans	TV mini-series
2000	Lourdes	Mother Superior	Lodovico Gasparini	TV movie
2002	Les Cordier, juge et flic	Anne-Marie	Jean-Marc Seban	TV series (1 episode)
2003	Commissaire Meyer	Fanny Meyer	Michel Favart	TV movie
2004	La crim'	Gwendoline Colbert	Dominique Guillo	TV series (1 episode)
2004	Le juge est une femme	Betty	Patrick Poubel	TV series (1 episode)
2005	Désiré Landru	Rolande's mother	Pierre Boutron	TV movie
2005	La parenthèse interdite	Nicole	David Delrieux	TV movie
2005	Disparition	Jeanne	Laurent Carcélès	TV mini-series
2005	Ricomincio da me	Azzurra Molinari	Rossella Izzo	TV mini-series
2005	Le cocon – Débuts à l'hôpital	Mrs. Bellon	Pascale Dallet	TV mini-series
2005	Carla Rubens	Ingrid Férol	Bernard Uzan	TV series (1 episode)
2006	La femme coquelicot	Madame Groslier	Jérôme Foulon	TV movie
2006	Tombé du ciel	Rosa	Stéphane Kappes	TV mini-series
2007	Mademoiselle Joubert	Sophie	Eric Summer	TV series (1 episode)
2008	Einstein	Pauline Kock	Liliana Cavani	TV movie
2008	Io ti assolvo	Veronica Zunin	Monica Vullo	TV movie
2008	Le nouveau monde	Gina	Étienne Dhaene	TV movie
2008	Mogli a pezzi	Clotilde Durini	Alessandro Benvenuti & Vincenzo Terracciano	TV mini-series
2009-11	Les toqués	Rose	Laurence Katrian, Patrick Malakian, ...	TV series (6 episodes)
2010	Due imbroglioni e mezzo	Georgine Bonaly	Franco Amurri	TV mini-series
2010	I delitti del cuoco	Gertrude Heine	Alessandro Capone	TV series (4 episodes)
2011-12	Week-end chez les Toquées	Rose	Emmanuel Jeaugey & Laurence Katrian	TV series (4 episodes)
2012	La victoire au bout du bâton	Claudette	Jean-Michel Verner	TV movie
2012	Vive la colo !	Yvonne	Dominique Ladoge	TV series (1 episode)
2014	La trouvaille de Juliette	Ginou	Jérôme Navarro	TV movie
2014	La vallée des mensonges	Mercedes	Stanislas Graziani	TV movie
2014	Famille d'accueil	Monique	Christophe Reichert	TV series (1 episode)
2017	Noir enigma	Albina Destouches	Manuel Boursinhac	TV movie
2017	Murders in Aix-en-Provence	Eléonore Dorval	Claude-Michel Rome	TV movie
2017	The law of Gloria	Countess de la Tour	Didier Le Pêcheur	TV series (1 episode)
2017	Le juge est une femme	Joséphine Marquand	Vincent Jamain & Éric Le Roux	TV series (2 episodes)
2018	Mongeville	Marguerite	Delphine Lemoine	TV series (1 episode)
2018-21	Alexandra Ehle	Laurette Doisneau	François Basset & Nicolas Guicheteau	TV series (5 episodes)
2019	Caïn	Agnès Vautrin	Bertrand Arthuys	TV series (2 episodes)
2019-20	Une belle histoire	Madame Merlin	Nadège Loiseau & Marie-Hélène Copti	TV series (2 episodes)
2020	Un mauvais garçon	Catherine Fontanelle	Xavier Durringer	TV movie
2020	La stagiaire	Chantal	Stéphane Kappes & Philippe Bérenger	TV series (8 episodes)
2021	Plan B	Adèle	Christophe Campos	TV series (2 episodes)
2022	L'impasse	Lise Neubourg	Delphine Lemoine	TV movie
2022	UFOs	Suzanne	Antony Cordier	TV series (3 episodes)

== Awards and nominations ==
Year	Award	Nominated work	Result
1976	César Award for Best Supporting Actress	Cookies	Nominated
1981	César Award for Best Supporting Actress	The Last Metro	Nominated
1997	David di Donatello for Best Supporting Actress	I'm Crazy About Iris Blond	Nominated
