= Victor Lanoux =

French actor (1936–2017)

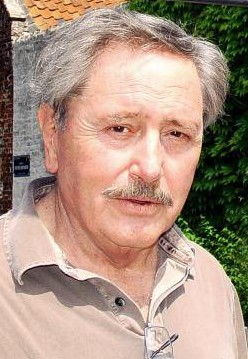
- Lanoux in June 2007
- Born: Victor Robert Nataf; 18 June 1936; Paris, France
- Died: 4 May 2017 (aged 80); Vaux-sur-Mer, France
- Years active: 1961–2017

Victor Robert Nataf (18 June 1936 – 4 May 2017), known professionally as Victor Lanoux, was a French actor known to English-speaking audiences for his role as Ludovic in Cousin Cousine (1975).

== Biography ==
Victor Robert Nataf was born to a Tunisian Jew from Sfax and a Catholic mother from Normandy. He was evacuated from Paris during the Second World War. Lanoux refers to the name used during his stay in La Chapelle-Taillefert during the French occupation where he lived until the age of 11, when he returned to Paris.

He left school at age 14 to become an apprentice varnisher. He worked a variety of jobs, including the Simca automotive assembly line, until he served in the French Army during the Algerian War and was wounded, being awarded the Medal for War Wounded (Médaille des blessés de guerre).

His father got him a job at the Studio de Billancourt. He learned acting by correspondence course, then a real course.

== Career ==
In 1961 he met Pierre Richard who was looking for someone to partner his cabaret act. They worked together for a number of years, including a season at the Bobino and a tour of Le Gorille.

The act was seen by René Allio who cast Lanoux in The Shameless Old Lady (1965). This led to a starring role in La Vie Normale (1967).

Georges Wilson of the TNP cast Lanoux as Laertes in 'Hamlet'; he followed this with 'La Folle de Chaillot' at the TNP, then a three-year run as star of Illusion Comique.

He received two nominations at the 1st César Awards in 1976, for his roles in Cousin Cousine and Adieu poulet. His best known role outside of Europe is perhaps that of The Thief in the 1985 comedy classic National Lampoon's European Vacation.

From 1998 to 2013, he played the lead role of the television series Louis la brocante, broadcast on France 3, where he portrayed a junk dealer who doubles as an amateur detective.

== Filmography ==
Year	Title	Role	Director	Notes
1961	Les mystères de Paris	Martial	Marcel Cravenne	TV movie
1962	Le théâtre de la jeunesse	Various	Alain Boudet	TV series (2 episodes)
1963	La chasse ou L'amour ravi	Oration	Alain Boudet (2)	TV movie
1963	Le théâtre de la jeunesse	Enjolras	Alain Boudet (3)	TV series (1 episode)
1964	Bayard	Bellabre	Claude Pierson	TV series (1 episode)
1964	Le théâtre de la jeunesse	Brigadier	Yves-André Hubert	TV series (1 episode)
1964	La vie normale	Jean-Pierre	André Charpak	
1965	The Shameless Old Lady	Pierre	René Allio	
1966	L'affaire du camion	The man	François Villiers	Short
1967	Par quatre chemins			TV movie
1968	Tu seras terriblement gentille	René	Dirk Sanders	
1968	Le crime de Lord Arthur Saville	Lord Arthur	André Michel	TV movie
1968	The Aeronauts	Lantier	François Villiers (2)	TV series (1 episode)
1968	Affaire Vilain contre ministère public	Georges	Robert Guez	TV series (1 episode)
1969	Le soleil des eaux	Francis Abondance	Jean-Paul Roux	TV movie
1970	À corps perdu	Christian Gauetti	Abder Isker	TV movie
1970	A contre soleil	Michel	Dirk Sanders (2)	TV movie
1970	Mont-Cinère	Frank Stevens	Jean-Paul Roux (2)	TV movie
1971	L'objet perdu	Jacques Joubes	André Michel (2)	TV movie
1972	Sette cervelli per un colpo perfetto	Gino	Roger Pigaut	
1972	Portrait : Pouchkine	Sobolevsky	Jean-Paul Roux (3)	TV movie
1973	Elle court, elle court la banlieue	Georges	Gérard Pirès	
1973	The Dominici Affair	Gustave Dominici	Claude Bernard-Aubert	
1973	Histoire d'une fille de ferme	Jacques	Claude Santelli	TV movie
1973	Two Men in Town	Marcel	José Giovanni	
1973	I Don't Know Much, But I'll Say Everything	The worker	Pierre Richard	
1973	La ligne de démarcation	Ernest	Jacques Ertaud	TV series (1 episode)
1974	Vani la merveille	Vani	Jean-Pierre Marchand	TV movie
1974	Jean Pinot, médecin d'aujourd'hui		Michel Fermaud	TV series (1 episode)
1975	La mort d'un guide	Maurice Merinchal	Jacques Ertaud (2)	TV movie
1975	The Common Man	Strong man	Yves Boisset	
1975	Le bel indifférent	Emile	Jacques Duhen	TV movie
1975	Folle à tuer	Georges	Yves Boisset (2)	
1975	Cousin Cousine	Ludovic	Jean-Charles Tacchella	Nominated - César Award for Best Actor
1975	The French Detective	Pierre Lardatte	Pierre Granier-Deferre	Nominated - César Award for Best Supporting Actor
1976	Pardon Mon Affaire	Bouly	Yves Robert	
1976	A Woman at Her Window	Michel Boutros	Pierre Granier-Deferre (2)	
1976	Ingeblikt	Writer	Anton Stevens	TV movie
1977	Servante et maîtresse	Jérôme	Bruno Gantillon	
1977	Le passé simple	François	Michel Drach	
1977	Pardon Mon Affaire, Too!	Bouly	Yves Robert (2)	
1977	Un moment d'égarement	Jacques	Claude Berri	
1978	La Carapate	Martial Gaulard	Gérard Oury	
1979	Un si joli village	Stéphane Bertin	Étienne Périer	
1979	The Dogs	Doctor Henri Ferret	Alain Jessua	
1979	Au bout du bout du banc	Ben Oppenheim	Peter Kassovitz	Also producer
1980	Retour en force	Adrien Blaussac	Jean-Marie Poiré	
1981	Une sale affaire	Novak	Alain Bonnot	
1981	La revanche	Alfred Jouvert	Pierre Lary	
1982	Boulevard des assassins	Charles Vallorba	Boramy Tioulong	
1982	Y a-t-il un Français dans la salle ?	Horace Tumelat	Jean-Pierre Mocky	
1983	Un dimanche de flic	Franck	Michel Vianey	
1983	Stella	The Swiss	Laurent Heynemann	
1984	Dog Day	Horace	Yves Boisset (3)	
1984	Louisiana	Charles de Vigors	Philippe de Broca	TV movie
1984	Thieves After Dark	Inspector Farbet	Samuel Fuller	
1984	Les fils des alligators	Michel Corleone	André Farwagi	TV movie
1984	La triche	Commissioner Michel Verta	Yannick Bellon	
1984	La smala	Robert	Jean-Loup Hubert	
1985	European Vacation	The Thief	Amy Heckerling	
1986	Série noire	Kant	Pierre Grimblat	TV series (1 episode)
1986	Scene of the Crime	Maurice	André Téchiné	
1987	Sale destin	François Marboni	Sylvain Madigan	
1988	Le clan	César Manotte	Claude Barma	TV mini-series
1989	L'invité surprise	Charles	Georges Lautner	
1989	Rouge Venise	The Witchfinder	Étienne Périer (2)	
1989-1995	Renseignements généraux	Roger Goupil	Philippe Lefebvre, Alain-Michel Blanc, ...	TV series (14 episodes)
1992	Le bal des casse-pieds	Frank	Yves Robert (3)	
1993	Maria des Eaux-Vives	Alexandre	Robert Mazoyer	TV mini-series
1994	Le cascadeur	Richard Delaistre	Josée Dayan	TV series (1 episode)
1996	Lifeline	Lucien Basso	Fred Gerber	TV movie
1996	Je m'appelle Régine	Joseph	Pierre Aknine	TV movie
1996	L'histoire du samedi	Thève Maravilliers	Alain Nahum	TV series (1 episode)
1997	Les démons de Jésus	Jo	Bernie Bonvoisin	
1998-2013	Louis la brocante	Louis Roman	Michel Favart, Pierre Sisser, ...	TV series (44 episodes)
1998	L'alambic	Amédée	Jean Marboeuf	TV movie
1998	Belle grand-mère	Pacha	Marion Sarraut	TV movie
1998	Le cascadeur	Richard Delaistre	Alain-Michel Blanc (2)	TV series (1 episode)
1999	Le frère Irlandais	Jean Langlois	Robin Davis	TV movie
1999	Les grandes bouches	Armand	Bernie Bonvoisin (2)	
1999	La position de l'escargot	Dédé	Mishka Saal	
2001	A Hell of a Day	Maurice Degombert	Marion Vernoux	
2002	Belle grand-mère 2	Pacha	Marion Sarraut (2)	TV movie
2003	Pierre et Farid	Pierre Marcellin	Michel Favart (2)	TV movie
2006-2016	Commissaire Laviolette	Commissioner Laviolette	Bruno Gantillon (2), Philomène Esposito, ...	TV series (8 episodes), (final appearance)
2012	La femme cachée	Marc Delvaux	Michel Favart (3)	TV movie
2014	Dommages collatéraux	Régis Morel	Michel Favart (4)	TV movie
2015	Le port de l'oubli	Vincent Lagarde	Bruno Gantillon (3)	TV movie

== Theater ==
Year	Title	Author	Director	Notes
1962	Le Bourgeois gentilhomme	Molière	Jean-Pierre Darras	
1962	Tartuffe	Molière	Roger Planchon	
1964	The Revenger's Tragedy	Cyril Tourneur	Francis Morane & Jean Serge	
1965	Hamlet	William Shakespeare	Georges Wilson	
1965	L'Illusion Comique	Pierre Corneille	Georges Wilson (2)	
1965	The Madwoman of Chaillot	Jean Giraudoux	Georges Wilson (3)	
1966-1968	Le Cheval évanoui	Françoise Sagan	Jacques Charon	
1969	The Resistible Rise of Arturo Ui	Bertolt Brecht	Georges Wilson (4)	
1973	Le Tourniquet	Victor Lanoux	Yves Bureau	
1974	Le Péril bleu ou méfiez-vous des autobus	Victor Lanoux	Victor Lanoux	
1976	Qui est qui ?	Keith Waterhouse & Willis Hall	Victor Lanoux (2)	
1981	Au Bonheur des Dames	Émile Zola	Jacques Échantillon	
1985	Voisin Voisine	Jerome Chodorov	Pierre Mondy	
1987	Le Tourniquet	Victor Lanoux	Victor Lanoux (3)	
1989	La Ritournelle	Victor Lanoux	Victor Lanoux (4)	Nominated - Molière Award for Best Playwright
1991	Same Time, Next Year	Bernard Slade	Roger Vadim	
1994	Drame au concert	Victor Lanoux	Victor Lanoux (5)	
2000	Master Class	David Pownall	Régis Santon	
