= Un si joli village =

- Directed by: Étienne Périer
- Written by: André G. Brunelin; Étienne Périer
- Based on: Le Moindre Mal by Jean Laborde
- Produced by: Adolphe Viezzi; Henri Lassa
- Starring: Victor Lanoux; Jean Carmet; Valérie Mairesse
- Cinematography: Roland Thénot; Jean Charvein
- Edited by: Annie Charvein; Renée Lichtig
- Music by: Paul Misraki
- Distributed by: NPF Planfilm
- Release date: 1979
- Running time: 116 minutes
- Country: France
- Language: French

Un si joli village (Such a Lovely Town...) is a 1979 French film directed by Étienne Périer. It is based on the novel Le Moindre Mal by Jean Laborde.

== Cast and roles ==
- Jean Carmet as Judge Fernand Noblet
- Victor Lanoux as Stéphane Bertin
- Valérie Mairesse as Muriel Olivier
- Michel Robin as Gaspard
- Gérard Jugnot as Fréval, the hotel manager
- Francis Lemaire as maître Demaison, Bertin's lawyer
- Alain Doutey as Debray
- Gérard Caillaud as Larsac
- Jacques Richard as Maurois, the unionist
- Anne Bellec as Nelly Bertin, Stéphane's sister
- Maurice Vallier as the doctor
- Jacques Canselier as Javel
- Jacques Chailleux as Riffaud
- Étienne Périer: Nelly's husband
- Mado Maurin as Élodie
- Lionel Vitrant as Delteil
- Bernard-Pierre Donnadieu as Arnoux
- Christian de Tillière as le procureur
- Jean Vigny as Priest Borie
- Raymond Loyer as judge
