= Charles Aznavour filmography =

This is a filmography for French singer Charles Aznavour. In a career spanning over 70 years, he appeared in about 90 feature films and was the subject of at least three documentary films.

== Feature films ==
- La Guerre des gosses (1936) … Extra
- Goodbye Darling (1946) (as Aznavour) … Le duettiste
- Entrez dans la danse (1948)
- Une gosse sensass (1957) … Le chanteur
- Paris Music Hall (1957) … Charles
- La Tête contre les murs (1959) … Heurtevent
- Les Dragueurs (1959) … Joseph Bouvier
- Pourquoi viens-tu si tard? (1959) … Un danseur
- Oh! Qué mambo (1959) … Un spectateur au cabaret (uncredited)
- Le Testament d'Orphée (1960) … The curious man (uncredited)
- Tomorrow Is My Turn (Le Passage du Rhin) (1960) … Roger
- Tirez sur le pianiste (1960) … Charlie Kohler/Édouard Saroyan
- Gosse de Paris (1961)
- Taxi for Tobruk (1961) … Samuel Goldmann
- Les Lions sont lâchés (1961) … Charles, un convive de Marie-Laure
- Horace 62 (1962) … Horace Fabiani
- Le Diable et les dix commandements (1962) … Denis Mayeux (episode "Homicide point ne seras")
- Les Quatre vérités (1962) … Charles
- Les Vierges (1963) … Berthet
- Destination Rome (1963) … Marcello
- Cherchez l'idole (1964) … Aznavour
- Le Rat d'Amérique (1963) … Charles
- Thomas l'imposteur (1964)
- Alta infedeltà (1964) … Giulio (segment "Peccato nel Pomeriggio")
- La Métamorphose des cloportes (1965) … Edmond
- le facteur s'en va-t-en guerre (1966) … Thibon
- Paris in August (1966) … Henri Plantin
- Darling Caroline (1968) … Postillon
- Candy (1968) … Hunchback juggler
- Le Temps des loups (1970) … Inspector
- The Adventurers (1970) … Marcel Campion
- L'Amour (1970) … Le présentateur
- The Games (1970) … Pavel Vendek
- Un beau monstre (1971) … Inspector Leroy
- La Part des lions (1971) … Éric Chambon
- The Selfish Giant (1972) … Narrator (French version)
- Les Intrus (1972) … Charles Bernard
- The Blockhouse (1973) … Visconti
- And Then There Were None (1974) … Michel Raven
- Sky Riders (1976) … Insp. Nikolidis
- Folies bourgeoises (1976) … Dr. Lartigue
- The Muppet Show (1977) … Guest appearance
- Die Blechtrommel (1979) … Sigismund Markus
- Ciao, les mecs (1979) … L'amnésique
- The Magic Mountain (1982) … Naphta
- Qu'est-ce qui fait courir David? (1982) … Léon, le père de David
- Les Fantômes du chapelier (1982) … Kachoudas
- Une jeunesse (1983) … Bellun
- Viva la vie! (1984) … Édouard Takvorian
- Yiddish Connection (1986) … Aaron Rapoport
- Mangeclous (1988) … Jérémie
- Il Maestro (1989) … Romualdi
- Le chinois (1989) … Charles Cotrel
- Charles Aznavour Armenia 1989 (1989)
- Les Années campagne (1992) … Grandfather
- Pondichéry, dernier comptoir des Indes (1997) … Léo Bauman
- Le Comédien (1997) … Monsieur Maillard
- Laguna (2001)
- The Truth About Charlie (2002) … Himself
- Ararat (2002) … Edward Saroyan
- Le Père Goriot (2004) … Jean-Joachim Goriot
- Ennemis publics (2005)
- The Colonel (2006) … Père Rossi
- Up (2009) … Carl Fredricksen (French version)

=== Documentary films ===
- Charles Aznavour – Armenia 1989 (1989) – About the humanitarian aid that Aznavour brought to his native Armenia after the 1988 Armenian earthquake.
- Christmas in Vienna III (1994) – A Christmas gala concert with Aznavour, Plácido Domingo and Sissel Kyrkjebø, featuring the Vienna Symphony conducted by Croatian conductor Vjekoslav Šutej.
- Making of "Colore Ma Vie" (2007) – A featurette accompanying the release of Aznavour's studio album Colore Ma Vie. Filmed in Havana and Paris, it shows his collaboration with Chucho Valdez.
