= Yves Claoué =

French composer

- Born: 1927
- Origin: France
- Died: 2001 (aged 73–74)
- Occupation: Composer

Yves Claoué (1927, Le Bouscat – 2001, Segonzac) was a 20th-century French composer.

== Music ==
- Concerto for harpsichord.
- Three mouvements for flute and piano.
- Sonate baroque in trio for organ.

== Incidental music ==
- 1957: Caesar and Cleopatra by George Bernard Shaw, directed by Jean Le Poulain (Théâtre Sarah Bernhard)
- 1958: La Hobereaute by Jacques Audiberti, directed by Jean Le Poulain (Théâtre du Vieux Colombier)
- La voix humaine by Cocteau (Théâtre central du Limousin)
- 1965: Antigone after Sophocles, directed by Jean-Pierre Laruy
- Patmos, oratorio by Jean Cocteau and Yves Claoué.
- 1966: George Dandin by Molière, directed by Jean-Pierre Laruy
  - La Fleur à la bouche by Luigi Pirandello, directed by Jean-Pierre Laruy
- 1967: Le Cid by Pierre Corneille, directed by Pierre Valde
  - Les Frères Karamazov by Jean-Pierre Laruy, directed by Jean-Pierre Laruy
- Cascade by Milorad Mišković (ballet) Opéra de Monte Carlo
- Minuterie by Jean Babilée
- 1969: Le Chant du fantoche lusitanien by Peter Weiss, directed by Jean-Pierre Laruy
- Anjou 33-93 by Jean Guelis
- 1970: La Comédie des erreurs after William Shakespeare, directed by Georges-Henri Régnier
- 1973: Mother Courage and Her Children by Bertolt Brecht, directed by Jean-Pierre Laruy
- 1984: Marat-Sade by Peter Weiss, directed by Gérard Laurent
- 1991–92: Phrases et Paraphrases sur la "Genèse", ensemble vocal, piano obligé
- 1992: Salve Regina for mixed choir

== Film scores ==
- 1954: Buffet et son art, documentary by Étienne Périer
- 1959: Bobosse, by Étienne Périer, with François Périer, Micheline Presle, Jacques Fabbri
- 1960: Murder at 45 R.P.M., by Étienne Périer, with Danielle Darrieux, Michel Auclair, Jean Servais
- 1962: Un chien dans un jeu de quilles, by Fabien Collin
