= Pure Air of the Mountain: For All and None =

2023 Feature film

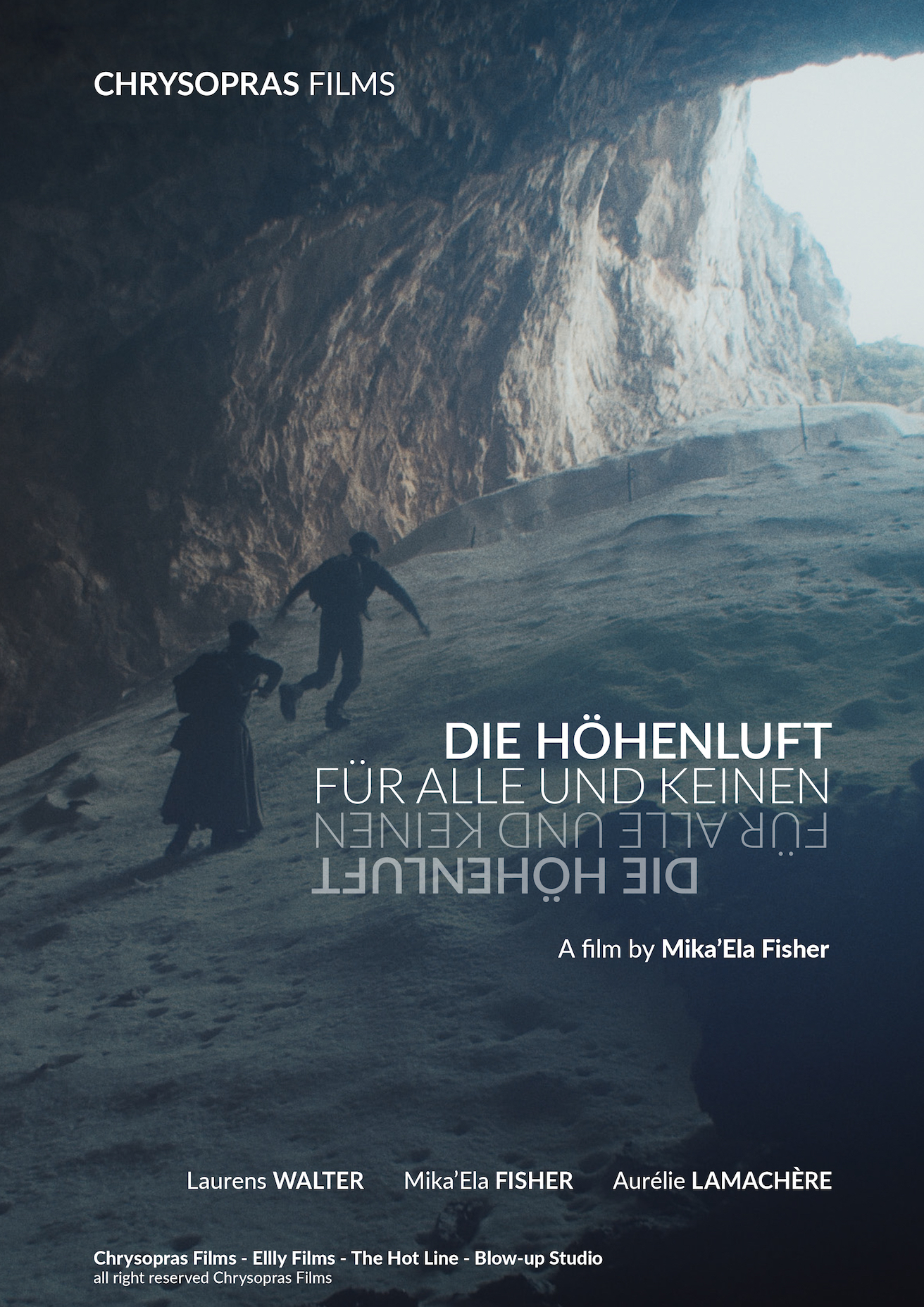
- German: Die Höhenluft - für Alle und Keinen
- Directed by: Mika'ela Fisher
- Written by: Mika'ela Fisher
- Produced by: Mika'Ela Fisher; Aline Bernard (co-producer)
- Starring: Laurens Walter; Mika'ela Fisher; Aurélie Lamachère
- Narrated by: Philippe Matic-Arnauld des Lions
- Cinematography: Sylvain Garnier Goutard
- Edited by: Noémi de Fouchier
- Music by: Sébastien Rostagno
- Production companies: Chrysopras Films; The Hot Line; Aroma Gbr; Ellly Films
- Distributed by: Partisan Filmverleih
- Release dates: 16 November 2023 (Germany); 9 October 2024 (France)
- Running time: 100 minutes
- Countries: Germany; France; Austria
- Language: German

Pure Air of the Mountain: For All and None (Original title: German: Die Höhenluft - für Alle und Keinen), (French: L'air de la montagne - pour tous et pour personne) is a German-French-Austrian avant-garde satire feature film written and directed by Mika'ela Fisher.

== Cast ==
- Laurens Walter as Spenta Mainyu
- Mika'ela Fisher as Angra Mainyu
- Aurélie Lamachère as Namenlose (Nameless) X

== Plot ==
Allegory: Angra, the woman, and Spenta, the man, (Angra and Spenta Mainyu come from Zoroastrian theology and characterize dualistic cosmology); the two have opposite characters, they give themselves to a betting game in which they choose from among the crowd a person, without identity, the nameless X. This unnamed lady will be the toy of both; and finally the three become one (Trinity), which is visualized by their similar clothes. Text from Friedrich Nietzsche's work Thus Spoke Zarathustra accompany the acts of the film, narrated by an observer, whom you never can see.

== Reception ==
Fishers debut feature film premiered at the 55th Hof International Film Festival and was released in German cinemas on 16 November 2023. Die Höhenluft - für Alle und Keinen (Pure Air of the Mountain:For All and None) to positive reviews.

On BGLand.de the reviewer writes (translated from German): Sophisticated art instead of popcorn cinema, Nietzsche prose instead of dull dialogue, thinking instead of being sprinkled: The film premiere of Die Höhenluft - für Alle und Keinen on Tuesday evening at the Berchtesgaden cinema left the audience's heads spinning. - Marcel Sowa: BGLand24.de

On Berchtesgadener Anzeiger the reviewer writes: Disturbing, but with beautiful images. - Kilian Pfeiffer: Berchtesgadener Anzeiger

On ICON Magazine the reviewer writes: Das Maß Ihrer Dinge (German) Die Höhenluft - für Alle und Keinen - Heike BLümner: ICON Axel Springer

The film is scheduled for release in French theatres on October 9, 2024.

On Jeune Cinéma the reviewer writes (translated from French): The director plays with the pieces of a jigsaw puzzle. She hints at several possible interpretations before bringing them to a close all at once. Which is enough to disconcert the viewer. Even irritating. The film may be cryptic in places, but it remains narrative and representative. The rigour of the mise-en-scène, which makes liberal use of irony, distance, mystification and the blending of genres - cinematographic and sexual - the beauty of Sylvain Garnier-Goutard's cinematography and the excellence of the acting make this summer grazing a treat. For All and None. - Nicole Gabriel: Revue Jeune Cinéma

=== Awards ===
- 55.Hof International Film Festival
- Florence Biennale 2025
