= 3rd César Awards =

1978 French film awards ceremony

- Date: 4 February 1978
- Site: Salle Pleyel, Paris, France
- Hosted by: Pierre Tchernia

Highlights
- Best Film: Providence
- Best Actor: Jean Rochefort
- Best Actress: Simone Signoret
- Most awards: Providence (7)
- Most nominations: Providence (8)

Television coverage
- Network: Antenne 2

The 3rd César Awards ceremony, presented by the Académie des Arts et Techniques du Cinéma, honoured the best French films of 1977 and took place on 4 February 1978 at the Salle Pleyel in Paris. The ceremony was chaired by Jeanne Moreau and hosted by Pierre Tchernia for the third time. Providence won the award for Best Film.

== Winners and nominees ==
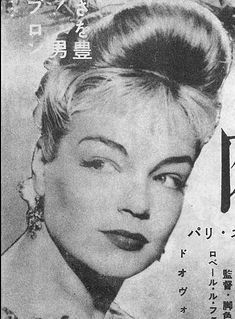
Simone Signoret, Best Actress winner

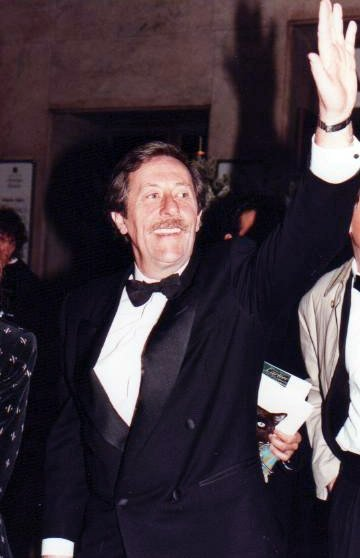
Jean Rochefort, Best Actor winner

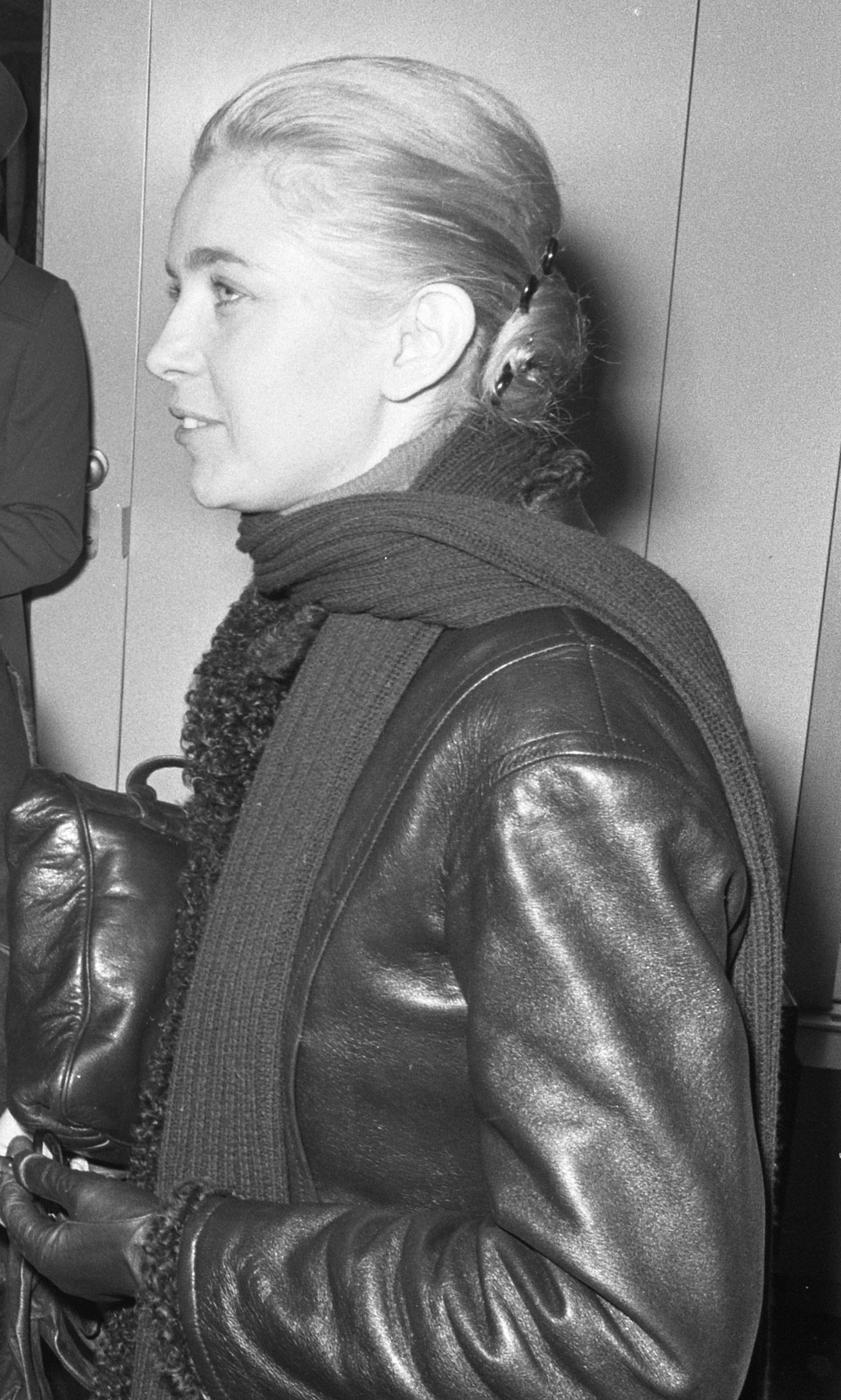
Marie Dubois, Best Supporting Actress winner

Best Film Providence: Le Crabe-tambour; The Lacemaker; Pardon Mon Affaire, Too!	Best Director Alain Resnais – Providence: Luis Buñuel – That Obscure Object of Desire; Pierre Schoendoerffer – Le Crabe-tambour; Claude Miller – This Sweet Sickness
Best Actor Jean Rochefort – Le Crabe-tambour: Gérard Depardieu – This Sweet Sickness; Charles Denner – The Man Who Loved Women; Patrick Dewaere – Le Juge Fayard dit Le Shériff; Alain Delon – Death of a Corrupt Man	Best Actress Simone Signoret – Madame Rosa: Isabelle Huppert – The Lacemaker; Miou-Miou – This Sweet Sickness; Brigitte Fossey – Closet Children; Delphine Seyrig – Repérages
Best Supporting Actor Jacques Dufilho – Le Crabe-tambour: Michel Aumont – Spoiled Children; Jean Bouise – Le Juge Fayard dit Le Shériff; Philippe Léotard – Le Juge Fayard dit Le Shériff; Jean-François Balmer – La Menace	Best Supporting Actress Marie Dubois – La Menace: Florence Giorgetti – The Lacemaker; Nelly Borgeaud – The Man Who Loved Women; Geneviève Fontanel – The Man Who Loved Women; Valérie Mairesse – Repérages
Best Screenplay, Dialogue or Adaptation Providence – David Mercer: That Obscure Object of Desire – Jean-Claude Carrière, Luis Buñuel; Death of a Corrupt Man – Michel Audiard; Pardon Mon Affaire, Too! – Jean-Loup Dabadie	Best Animated Short Film Rêve: Fracture; Kubrick à brac; Mordillissimo; La Nichée
Best Cinematography Raoul Coutard – Le Crabe-tambour: Pierre Lhomme – This Sweet Sickness; Andréas Winding – The Accuser; Ricardo Aronovich – Providence	Best Editing Albert Jurgenson – Providence: Chris Marker – A Grin Without a Cat; Henri Lanoë – La Menace; Françoise Bonno – The Simple Past
Best Sound René Magnol and Jacques Maumont – Providence: Bernard Aubouy – Peppermint Soda; Paul Lainé, François Bel and Pierre Ley – This Sweet Sickness; Jean-Pierre Ruh – Madame Rosa	Best Original Music Miklós Rózsa – Providence: Vladimir Cosma – Animal; Francis Lai – Bilitis; Philippe Sarde – Le Crabe-tambour
Best Production Design Jacques Saulnier – Providence: Hilton McConnico – This Sweet Sickness; Jean-Pierre Kohut-Svelko – Pardon Mon Affaire, Too!; Bernard Evein – Madame Rosa	Best Documentary Short Film Le Maréchal-ferrant: Ben Chavis; La Loterie de la vie; Naissance; Samara
Best Fiction Short Film 500 grammes de foie de veau: Le Blanc des yeux; Je veux mourir dans la patrie de Jean-Paul Sartre; Sauf dimanches et fêtes; Temps souterrain	Best Foreign Film A Special Day: The American Friend; Annie Hall; Bread and Chocolate
Honorary César Robert Dorfmann; René Goscinny

== Films with multiple nominations and awards ==
The following films received multiple nominations:

Nominations	Film
8	Providence
6	Le Crabe-tambour
6	This Sweet Sickness
3	The Lacemaker
3	Pardon Mon Affaire, Too!
3	The Man Who Loved Women
3	Le Juge Fayard dit Le Shériff
3	La Menace
2	That Obscure Object of Desire
2	Death of a Corrupt Man
2	Repérages
2	Madame Rosa

The following films received multiple awards:

Awards	Film
7	Providence
3	Le Crabe-tambour

== See also ==
- 50th Academy Awards
- 31st British Academy Film Awards
