= Murder at 45 R.P.M. =

1960 film by Etienne Perier

- Directed by: Étienne Périer
- Written by: Dominique Fabre; Etienne Perier; Albert Valentin
- Based on: A coeur perdu by Pierre Boiteau and Boileau-Narcejac
- Produced by: Jacques Bar
- Starring: Danielle Darrieux; Michel Auclair; Jean Servais
- Cinematography: Marcel Weiss
- Edited by: Monique Isnardon; Robert Isnardon
- Music by: Yves Claoué
- Color process: Black and white
- Production company: Cité Films
- Distributed by: Metro-Goldwyn-Mayer
- Release date: 25 May 1960
- Running time: 98 minutes
- Country: France
- Language: French
- Budget: $250,000
- Box office: $600,000

Murder at 45 RPM (French: Meurtre en 45 tours) is a 1960 French psychological thriller film directed by Étienne Périer and starring Danielle Darrieux, Michel Auclair and Jean Servais. It was shot at the Saint-Maurice Studios in Paris. The film's sets were designed by the art director Jean Mandaroux. It is an adaptation of the 1959 novel A coeur perdu by Pierre Boiteau and Boileau-Narcejac.

== Synopsis ==
The composer Maurice Faugères is dangerously jealous of his wife, Ève, who is a singer, and her accompanist, Jean Le Prat. Both of them believe he is hunting them down and watching them. When Faugères dies in a car accident, Ève thinks Jean is a murderer – and vice versa.

== Cast ==
- Danielle Darrieux as Ève Faugères
- Michel Auclair as Jean Le Prat
- Jean Servais as Maurice Faugères
- Henri Guisol as Georges Meliot
- Raymond Gérôme as le commissaire
- Mathilde Casadesus as Elsa
- Jacqueline Danno as Florence
- Julien Verdier as l'aveugle
- Bernard Musson as Jérôme, le valet
- Madeleine Barbulée as la secrétaire
- Ada Lonati as la bonne
- Bernard Lajarrige as Moureu
- Paul Mercey as le vendeur d'autos

== Reception ==
According to MGM Records the film made a profit of $9,000.

== See also ==
- List of French films of 1960

== Bibliography ==
- Goble, Alan. The Complete Index to Literary Sources in Film. Walter de Gruyter, 1999.
- Lentz, Harris M. Feature Films, 1960–1969: A Filmography of English-Language and Major Foreign-Language United States Releases. McFarland, 2009.
