= Servant and Mistress =

- Theatrical release poster
- Directed by: Bruno Gantillon
- Written by: Dominique Fabre; Bruno Gantillon
- Story by: Frantz-André Burguet; Dominique Fabre
- Produced by: Gilbert de Goldschmidt; Francis Mischkind
- Starring: Victor Lanoux; Andréa Ferréol
- Cinematography: Étienne Szabo
- Edited by: Georges Klotz
- Music by: Jean-Marie Benjamin
- Production companies: Madeleine Films; Shangrila Productions; Société Française de Production
- Distributed by: F.F.C.M.
- Release date: 2 March 1977
- Running time: 90 minutes
- Country: France
- Language: French

Servant and Mistress (French: Servante et maîtresse) is a 1977 French drama film directed by Bruno Gantillon and starring Victor Lanoux and Andréa Ferréol.

== Cast ==
- Victor Lanoux as Jérôme
- Andréa Ferréol as Maria
- Évelyne Buyle as Christine
- Gabriel Cattand as Charles
- David Pontremoli as Paul
- Jean Rougerie as Chef de Cabinet
