= Les Assassins de l'ordre =

1971 film

- Film poster
- Directed by: Marcel Carné
- Screenplay by: Paul Andréota; Marcel Carné
- Based on: Les Assassins de l'ordre by Jean Laborde
- Produced by: Michel Ardan
- Starring: Jacques Brel
- Cinematography: Jean Badal
- Edited by: Henri Rust
- Music by: Pierre Henry; Michel Colombier
- Production companies: Les Productions Belles Rves; West Film
- Release dates: May 7, 1971 (France); September 30, 1971 (Italy)
- Running time: 110 minutes
- Countries: France; Italy

Les Assassins de l'ordre (lit. 'The Assassins of Order') is a 1971 crime film starring Jacques Brel and directed by Marcel Carné. The film is based on the novel Les Assassins de l'ordre by Jean Laborde. The novel was based on the real-life incident where a man who was accused to stealing a watch was beaten to death by three police officers. The film is about an magistrate who is assigned to examine the case of two policemen and their inspector who have beaten a suspect to death. By the time the case is heard in court, all the witnesses and the widow's counsel have been intimidated into silence, which leads to the magistrate coming under heavy pressure to drop the case, and to have the three murderers walk free.

The film opened in France on May 7, 1971. It was later shown at the 7th Moscow International Film Festival in July 1971 and later out of competition at the Venice Film Festival. In France it had a 1,142,534 spectators, making it the 21st highest-grossing film in France in 1971.

== Plot ==
In Provence just before Christmas, a former prisoner suspected of robbery is dragged from his home by two policemen, taken to the police station, and beaten to death. His widow then files a charge and the case is allocated to the magistrate Bernard Level for judicial investigation. Both the two policemen and the inspector on duty deny any wrongdoing, as does the one other policeman in the station and two men then in custody, all of them claiming that the death was an accident, perhaps a heart attack. The autopsy is explicit however, so Level must either break the false testimony of at least one person in the station or find other witnesses.

His efforts unearth two new witnesses: a prostitute who was in custody at the time but was whisked out of town by the police, and a bartender who served the dead man on his way home for the last time. He recommends prosecution of the two policemen and of the inspector who covers up for them. By the time the case comes to court, all the witnesses and the widow's counsel have been intimidated into silence, while Level himself has come under intense pressure. His son has had marijuana planted on him while his girl friend, an Italian antiques dealer, has been sold a stolen object and faces deportation.

Despite the efforts of the presiding judge to get witnesses to tell the truth, the trial is a foregone conclusion and the three guilty men are acquitted. Level has to rethink his future.

== Cast ==
Cast adapted from French Thrillers of the 1970s: Volume I, Crime Films (2026).

- Jacques Brel as Investigating Judge Bernard Level
- Catherine Rouvel as Danielle Lebègue
- Paola Pitagora as Laura
- Charles Denner as Maître Graziani
- Didier Haudepin as François Level
- Michael Lonsdale as Commissioner Berntrand
- Roland Lesaffre as Michel Saugeat
- François Cadet as Inspector Édouard Rabut
- Serge Sauvion as Inspector Bonetti
- Boby Lapointe as Louis Casso
- Jean-Roger Caussimon as Divisional Commissioner Lagache
- Harry-Max as court clerk Moulard
- Pierre Maguelon as police officer Lathuile
- Luc Ponette as Maître Rivette
- Marius Laurey as André Véricel, the burglar
- Lucien Barjon as Ernest Mauvoisins
- Jean Franval as Doctor Sabtier
- Jacques Legras as inspector at Antiue shop
- Luc Merenda as Marco

== Background and production ==
In 1946, Roger Grangé trader was suspected of selling a platinum watch and died as a result of his interrogation by a commissioner and two inspectors. In 1948, Jean Laborde, the legal columnist for France-Soir covered the trial of Jovin, where the three accused were convicted for causing the death of the convicted by beating him up. Laborde would go on to become a novelist and wrote a novel based on the events titled Les Assassins de l'orde (lit. 'The Assassins of Order'). Just 15 days after the book's publication, director Alexandre Astruc approached the author to adapt the book for a film production with producer Raoul Lévy. The writer explained that after contracts were drawn for it, concerns on how censors would react for a film where the police would be blamed for wrong-doing to such an extent that the project was initially abandoned.

Director Marcel Carné then expressed an interest in adapting the novel, saying in 1971 that he had wanted to adapt it to film for five years, but said producers were still fearful that it would be banned due to its content. Michel Ardan approached Carne to adapt the film. Carné was allowed to make a film on the topic he wanted with the conditions to stay within a very precise financial budget and to find a subject that would allow him to cast a popular film star. Carné thought of a number of actors, and eventually approached Jacques Brel for the role who he had met backstage after a performance of Man of La Mancha. Carné hired Paul Andréota to co-write the screenplay with him and gave a summary of it to Brel, who accepted the role. Les Production Bells Revies purchased the rights to adapt the book on September 15, 1970. Les Assassins de l'ordre was a French and Italian co-production between the Paris-based Les Productions Belles Rives, and the Rome-based West Film.

The theme and low-budget nature of the film led to various difficulties during production, such as crew members being laid off two weeks before production began. Carné recalled that the trial of Alain Geismar related to the events of May 68 in France had added tension on set. When he attempted to direct scene that would involve a hundred student extras, he arrived to find a sign saying his extras were on strike. Ardan, the film's producer, tried to reason with the students unsuccessfully. This upset him as he felt believed that the film was contributing to the students' political cause.

== Release and reception ==
Les Assassins de l'ordre was released in France on May 7, 1971. In France it had a 1,142,534 spectators, making it the 21st highest-grossing film in France in 1971. It was screened at the 7th Moscow International Film Festival in July 1971 and later out of competition at the Venice Film Festival. At the Moscow Film Festival, it won an audience award. It was released in Italy as Inchiesta su un delitto della polizia on September 30, 1971.

Carné said that the film received little attention by the press. From contemporary reviews, Guy Hennebelle of Cinema 70 said that while the film was enjoyable it suffered due to tedious and laborious amount of preachiness. Benard Cohn in Positif found that the film only touched upon current problems such as generational conflicts and protests and should have more lyricism.
