= Paul Andréota =

French writer

- Born: Paul Andréota; 11 December 1917; La Rochelle, France
- Died: 14 November 2007 (aged 89); La Rochelle, France
- Occupations: novelist, screenwriter
- Writing career
- Pen name: Paul Vance

Paul Andréota (11 December 1917 – 14 November 2007) was a French novelist and screenwriter. He was also known under the pen name Paul Vance.

== Biography ==
Paul Andréota was born in La Rochelle in the present-ay Charente-Maritime department (it was then known as Charente-Inférieure). When he was 12 years old, his father died. His mother moved the family to Paris.

After earning a Bachelor of Arts degree and entering the École Normale Supérieure, Andreota started studying music at the conservatory. He was a big fan of jazz and concentrated on piano and composition, .

The onset of World War II changed Andréota's life dramatically. He spent part of the period of the German occupation of France in Marseille.

For a time it was free of German occupiers and was operated under the Vichy government. His postwar writing reflected that period, and the city of Marseille was the setting for his first novel after the war: Hors Jeu (lit. "Offside"), published by Grasset in 1947. His next novel, Evangeline (1948), was dedicated to his friend, writer Michel Perrin'. He published Attentat à la pudeur (lit. "Indecent Assault") in 1949. After completing these latter two autobiographical novels, he was inspired to change his direction in writing.

He became a screenwriter, beginning with adaptations and dialogues. He wrote approximately 40 films, collaborating with famous directors.

In 1968, he also wrote for the stage, but returned to literature. Meanwhile, he also wrote screenplays and dialogues for the TV series Commissaire Moulin and Marie Pervenche. Later, under the pseudonym Paul Vance, he published two crime novels for Le Masque (lit. "The Mask").

== Works ==
=== Novels as Paul Andréota ===
- Hors Jeu, Grasset, 1947
- Evangéline, Fasquelle, 1948
- Attentat à la pudeur, Denoël, 1949

=== Mystery novels as Paul Andréota ===
- Ni tout à fait le même (lit. "Not Quite the Same"), Denoël, 1968
- Zigzags, PJ/Julliard, 1969 - Grand Prix de Littérature Policière (1970); reissued by Le Livre de Poche (1977)
- La Pieuvre (lit. "The Octopus"), PJ/Julliard, 1970 - adapted for film as Les Suspects (lit. "The Suspects"); reissued by Club des Masques (1981)
- Le Piège (lit. "Trap"), Stock, 1972 - Best Screenplay, published in the United States as The Sweet Taste of Burning
- Les Lames (lit. "Blades"), Stock, 1973
- Le Scénario (lit. "Scenario"), Stock, 1974
- La Maison des oiseaux (lit. "The House of Birds"), Librairie des Champs-Élysées, 1975; reissued by Le Masque (1981)
- Schizo, Librairie des Champs-Élysées, 1977

=== Mystery novels as Paul Vance ===
- Le Puits, la corde et le seau (lit. "The Well, The Rope, and The Bucket") (1977)
- Échec à l'innocence (lit. "Failure to Innocence") (1977)

== Filmography ==
=== Writer (Adaptations and dialogue) ===
- 1954 - La Rage au corps (US title: Tempest in the Flesh) - directed by Ralph Habib
- 1954 - Secrets d'alcôve (lit. "Alcove Secrets") - the "Riviera-Express" segment, realized by Ralph Habib
- 1954 - Orient Express - directed by Carlo Ludovico Bragaglia
- 1955 - Escale à Orly (lit. "Stopover at Orly") - directed by Jean Dréville
- 1955 - Blackmail - directed by Guy Lefranc
- 1956 - La Sorcière (lit. "The Witch") - directed by André Michel
- 1956 - Women's Club - directed by Ralph Habib
- 1957 - La Peau de l'ours (lit. "The Skin of the Bear") - directed by Claude Boissol
- 1958 - Rafles sur la ville (lit. "Raids on the Town") - directed by Pierre Chenal
- 1959 - Le Passager clandestin (English: "The Stowaway") - directed by Ralph Habib and Lee Robinson
- 1961 - Napoleon II, the Eagle - directed by Claude Boissol
- 1963 - Les Bonnes Causes (lit. "The Good Causes") - directed by Christian-Jaque
- 1964 - La Tulipe noire (lit. "The Black Tulip") - directed by Christian-Jaque
- 1965 - Me and the Forty Year Old Man - directed by Jack Pinoteau
- 1966 - The Second Twin - directed by Christian-Jaque
- 1966 - La Nuit des adieux (lit. "The Night of Farewells") - directed by Jean Dréville and Isaak Menaker
- 1968 - Love in the Night - directed by Marcel Camus
- 1971 - Les Assassins de l'ordre - directed by Marcel Carné
- 1971 - Franz - directed by Jacques Brel
- 1972 - The Lonely Woman - directed by Francisco Rovira Beleta
- 1974 - Verdict - directed by André Cayatte
- 1974 - The Suspects - directed by Michel Wyn
