= Le Temps des loups =

- Directed by: Sergio Gobbi
- Screenplay by: Georges Tabet; André Tabet; Sergio Gobbi
- Story by: Sergio Gobbi
- Starring: Robert Hossein; Virna Lisi
- Cinematography: Daniel Diot
- Edited by: Gabriel Rongier
- Music by: Georges Garvarentz
- Production companies: Lira Films; Paris Cannes Production; Seven Film
- Release dates: January 21, 1970 (France); April 23, 1970 (Italy)
- Countries: France; Italy
- Budget: 3.5 million francs

Le Temps des loups (lit. 'The Time of Wolves') is a 1970 crime directed by Sergio Gobbi. The film stars Robert Hossein as Robert and Charles Aznavour as Kramer. Initially childhood friends, Robert grows to be a criminal known as Dillinger and Kramer grows up to be a police officer. As Robert and his gang perform a series of heists in Paris, Kramer is tasked with capturing him. Dillinger leaves Paris to the French Riviera with Kramer tracking him down.

A French and Italian co-production, Le Temps des loups was initially going to be a period set film base don the life of John Dillinger, but changed to a contemporary setting. The film was a box office hit in France on its initial release.

== Cast ==
Cast adapted from French Thrillers of the 1970s: Volume I, Crime Films (2026).

- Robert Hossein as Robert "Dillinger"
- Charles Aznavour as Commissioner Kramer
- Virna Lisi as Stella Menzoni
- Albert Minski as Albert
- Geneviève Thénier as Geneviève
- Monique Morisi as Janine
- Marcel Bozzuffi as Marco
- Henri Crémieux as Catholic school headmaster
- Roger Coggio as Innkeeper
- Antonio Passalia as Lucien
- Fred Ulysse as Jean
- Félix Marten as Charles, nightclub owner
- Robert Dalban as Gas station owner
- Jacques Castelot as Investigating judge
- Madeleine Sologne as Robert's mother

== Production ==
Le Temps des loups was suggested by actor Robert Hossein as a film that exploits the life of gangster John Dillinger to director Sergio Gobbi. Gobbi was initially skeptical, saying that a period film would be too costly, which Hossein replied that he head a three-film deal with Raymond Danon so that financing the film would not be a problem. The films script, written by Georges Tabet, André Tabet and Gobbi, was re-worked to be set in the present day with the story being not just about Dillinger, but about Kramer, the police officer who is after him. It had a working title of Dillinger, vous connaissez? (lit. 'Do You Know Dillinger?') Le Temps des loups was a French-Italian co-production between the Paris-based companies Lira Films and Paris Cannes Production and the Rome-based Seven Films. The film was 80% French and 20% Italian, with a budget of 3.5 million francs.

Initially, Hossein's ex-wife Marina Vlady were to be cast together, with Vlady's role eventually going to Virna Lisi. Gobbi re-wrote and expanded her role initially written as a gas station attendant, but expanded into a gambling addict and socialite. Lisi only had two weeks onset in July.

== Release ==
Le Temps des loups was released in France on January 21, 1970. The film had sneak previews as early as November 24, 1969. The authors of French Thrillers of the 1970s: Volume I, Crime Films (2026) described the film as a "box-office hit", with over 1,235,500 spectators in France.

The film was released in Italy on April 23, 1970. It was first released as Uccidi uccidi uccidi ancora (lit. 'Kill Kill Kill Again') and then soon changes to Temps des loups, tempo di violenza. It grossed a little more than 256 million lire in Italy.

The film was released in the United States on November 19, 1976. It was released in the United States as both The Heist and Carbon Copy. It was released in the United Kingdom as The Last Shot.

== See also ==
- Charles Aznavour filmography
- List of French films of 1970
