= Enfantasme =

1978 film

- Directed by: Sergio Gobbi
- Screenplay by: Ugo Pirro; Sergio Gobbi
- Based on: Enfantasme by Georges-Jean Arnaud
- Starring: Agostina Belli; Stefano Satta Flores; Serge Youssoufian
- Cinematography: Ennio Guarnieri
- Edited by: Ruggero Mastroianni
- Music by: Stelvio Cipriani
- Production companies: Ark Cinematografica; Paris Cannes Production A.A.
- Distributed by: Battistelli
- Release dates: 5 November 1978 (Italy); 8 November 1978 (France)
- Running time: 104 minutes
- Countries: Italy; France

Enfantasme is a 1978 film co-written and directed by Sergio Gobbi. It is based on the novel Enfantasme by Georges-Jean Arnaud.

== Plot ==
After her son's death, Claudia retreats to the mountains, convinced that her husband killed the child.

== Cast ==
- Agostina Belli as Claudia Lanza
- Stefano Satta Flores as Andrea Lanza
- Serge Youssoufian as Sergino
- Elisa Pozzi as Armida
- Jean-Claude Bouillon as Sisti
- Antonio Cantafora as Flavio
- Brigitte Skay
- Gerard Manigou
- Aïché Nana

== Production ==
Enfantasme was director Sergio Gobbi's fourteenth film which he chose to adapt the novel Enfantasme by French writer Georges-Jean Arnaud. Gobbi described the films title as a play on words based on the French words "enfant" for child, "fantasme" (ghost)" and the verb "enfanter" (to conceive a child). Gobbi stated the film could have been "turned into a product of the Exorcist thread, or a paranormal film, Audrey Rose-style. Whereas I don't want to be conditioned or stick to formulas.

Enfantasme was shot in five weeks in the village of Bormio.

== Release ==
Enfantasme was distributed in Italy where it was distributed by Battistelli on 5 November 1978. In Italy, the film grossed a total of 9,157,000 Italian lire domestically. It was released in France asL'enfant de nuit: Les inconnus aux petit pieds on 8 November 1978.

The novel of the film was adapted again for film in 2009 by Jean-Paul Guyon as Sommeil blanc.

== Reception ==
Italian film historian Roberto Curti described the critical reception to the film on its released as "mixed."
