= Asphalt Warriors =

L'arbalète
- Directed by: Sergio Gobbi
- Written by: Sergio Gobbi
- Produced by: Sergio Gobbi
- Starring: Daniel Auteuil; Marisa Berenson; Marcel Bozzuffi; Daniel Ubaud; Isaach de Bankolé; Isabelle Mergault; Alex Descas
- Cinematography: Richard Andry
- Edited by: Robert Rongier
- Music by: Jacques Revaux
- Release date: 14 November 1984
- Running time: 90 minutes
- Country: France
- Language: French
- Box office: $5.3 million

Asphalt Warriors aka The Syringe (original title: L'Arbalète ("the crossbow")) is a French action movie made by Sergio Gobbi in 1984. It stars Daniel Auteuil as the main character.

== Plot ==
In Paris, fights break out between ethnic gangs.
