= Love Me Strangely =

1971 film by Sergio Gobbi

- French theatrical release poster
- French: Un beau monstre
- Directed by: Sergio Gobbi
- Screenplay by: Georges Tabet; André Tabet; Sergio Gobbi
- Adaptation by: Dominique Fabre; Georges Tabet; André Tabet; Sergio Gobbi
- Based on: Un beau monstre by Dominique Fabre
- Produced by: Sergio Gobbi
- Starring: Virna Lisi; Helmut Berger; Charles Aznavour; Alain Noury; Marc Cassot; Françoise Brion
- Cinematography: Daniel Diot
- Edited by: Gabriel Rongier
- Music by: Georges Garvarentz
- Production companies: Paris-Cannes Productions; Mega Film
- Distributed by: CFDC; Sirius; Consortium Pathé (France); Panta Cinematografica Distribuzione (Italy)
- Release dates: 10 February 1971 (France); 30 April 1971 (Italy)
- Running time: 125 minutes
- Countries: France; Italy
- Language: French

Love Me Strangely (French: Un beau monstre, Italian: Il bel mostro, also known as A Strange Love Affair, Two Girls in My Bed and A Handsome Monster) is a 1971 psychological thriller film co-written and directed by Sergio Gobbi, based on the 1968 novel Un beau monstre by Dominique Fabre. It stars Virna Lisi, Helmut Berger, Charles Aznavour, Alain Noury, Marc Cassot and Françoise Brion.

== Plot ==
In Paris, Alain Revent is a wealthy, refined and sadistic man who takes pleasure in abusing women after luring them into a relationship. One day, his distressed first wife, Sylvie, desperately searches for a bottle of medicine that Alain himself has made her addicted to, but is unable to find it. Shortly after he leaves the apartment for a moment, Sylvie commits suicide by throwing herself from the balcony. The suicide is witnessed by the beautiful Nathalie, who lives in the building across the street. As Alain rushes back to the apartment, he and Nathalie stare at each other in shock.

Alain and Nathalie cross paths again at the police station, where she accidentally leaves her scarf behind. That night, Alain calls Nathalie and arranges to meet her the next day in order to return her scarf. At a bar, Alain and Nathalie quickly develop a mutual attraction and continue to see each other over the next few days. Nathalie eventually marries Alain, unaware that it was he who drove Sylvie to suicide. Soon, Alain alternates between flattering and tormenting Nathalie. During their honeymoon in Venice, Alain secretly solicits a prostitute.

Back in Paris, Alain has an affair with Nathalie's best friend Jacqueline. Later that night, Nathalie tries to leave Alain, but the apartment door is locked, and he taunts her by refusing to give her the keys. Nathalie has a nervous breakdown and throws herself against the bathroom mirror, slitting her wrists. Alain begins drugging Nathalie, whose mental state gradually deteriorates. Suspicious of Alain, Inspector Leroy has a chemist examine a blood sample from Nathalie, and traces of a psychoactive drug are found in her blood. A toxicologist explains to Leroy that the sudden withdrawal of such drugs could lead to suicide.

Determined to save Nathalie from Alain's clutches, Leroy visits her while Alain is out and offers his help, but she assures Leroy that she and Alain are happy together. One night, Alain throws an extravagant birthday party for his equally perverse friend Dino at the apartment. To Alain's surprise, Nathalie emerges from her room in a glamorous dress and, to make her husband jealous, invites Dino to dance with her. Afterwards, Dino privately suggests to Nathalie that they have sex, claiming it would make Alain happy as he enjoys suffering too. Disgusted, Nathalie orders Dino to leave.

Nathalie files for divorce on the grounds of an unconsummated marriage, but Alain proves the marriage was consummated by revealing that Nathalie is pregnant, which comes as a shock to her. Nathalie runs away from Alain, and after a doctor confirms that she is eight weeks pregnant, she recalls the moment Alain raped her after drugging her. At the police station, Leroy warns Nathalie that Alain is dangerous and urges her to seek police protection, but she responds that Alain needs her.

That night, Nathalie tearfully calls Alain from a hotel; he apologizes for hurting her and tells her that he is coming to pick her up. After reuniting at Alain's apartment, the two embrace and kiss passionately. Shortly afterwards, Leroy is summoned to Alain's building, which is surrounded by police, and finds the dead bodies of Nathalie and Alain next to each other on the ground, having seemingly committed suicide together.

== Cast ==
- Virna Lisi as Nathalie Revent
- Helmut Berger as Alain Revent
- Charles Aznavour as Inspector Leroy
- Alain Noury as Dino
- Marc Cassot as Vincent
- Françoise Brion as Jacqueline
- Édith Scob as Sylvie Revent
- Yves Brainville as Commissioner Dedru
- Henri Crémieux as Professor Richet
- Robert Le Béal as the judge
- Howard Vernon as Mr. Wassermann, the property manager
- Seda Aznavour as Alain's neighbor
- Robert Berri as Alain's concierge
- Georges Berthomieu as the toxicologist
- Paul Bonifas as the hotel doorman
- André Chanu as Dr. Schwartz
- Alberto Farnese as Alain's friend
- Dominique Marcas as a neighbor
- Guy Marly as the chemist
- Paul Pavel as the delivery man
- Michel Peyrelon as the maître d'hôtel
- Jacques Castelot (uncredited)
