= The Second Twin =

1966 film

- Directed by: Christian-Jaque
- Written by: Paul Andréota; Christian-Jaque; Jacques Sigurd
- Based on: Un homme à part entière by Jean Laborde
- Produced by: Agnès Delahaie
- Starring: Michèle Mercier; Robert Hossein; Pascale de Boysson
- Cinematography: Pierre Petit
- Edited by: Jacques Desagneaux
- Music by: Jacques Loussier
- Production companies: Agnes Delahaie Productions; Explorer Films; Valoria Films
- Distributed by: Valoria Films
- Release date: 20 January 1966
- Running time: 90 minutes
- Countries: France; Italy
- Language: French

The Second Twin (French: La seconde vérité, Italian: L'amante infedele) is a 1966 French-Italian mystery crime film directed by Christian-Jaque and starring Michèle Mercier, Robert Hossein and Pascale de Boysson. It was adapted from on a novel by Jean Laborde. It was shot partly at the Billancourt Studios in Paris and on location around Dijon. The film's sets were designed by the art director Jacques Douy.

== Synopsis ==
Pierre Montaud, a respected and married lawyer, falls in love with Nathalie Neuville who is works as a hostess in a nightclub in order to fund her medical studies. However, when a former fiancée of hers is murdered, he finds himself under suspicion for the killing.

== Cast ==
- Michèle Mercier as Nathalie Neuville, Medical student
- Robert Hossein as Pierre Montaud, the Advocate
- Pascale de Boysson as Suzanne
- Jacques Castelot as Le procureur
- Jean-Pierre Darras as Le commissaire
- Raymond Gérôme as Le juge
- Fernand Guiot as Le reporter
- Pierre-Louis as Le radio reporter
- Jean Michaud as L'avocat de Montaud
- Malka Ribowska as Hélène Montaud
- Jean-Claude Rolland as Olivier Lacat
- Bernard Tiphaine as Vaden
- Pierre Leproux as Le juge d'instruction
- André Luguet as L'avocat
- Léonce Corne as Le greffier
- Jean Marchat as Le procureur

== Bibliography ==
- Bessy, Maurice, Chirat, Raymond & Bernard, André. Histoire du cinéma français: encyclopédie des films 1966-1970. Pygmalion, 1986.
- Goble, Alan. The Complete Index to Literary Sources in Film. Walter de Gruyter, 1999.
- Rège, Philippe. Encyclopedia of French Film Directors, Volume 1. Scarecrow Press, 2009.
