= Louisiana (1984 film) =

- Directed by: Philippe de Broca; Jacques Demy (uncredited)
- Written by: Étienne Pèrier; Dominique Fabre; Charles E. Israel
- Based on: Louisiane and Fausse Rivière by Maurice Denuzière
- Produced by: John Kemeny; Denis Héroux
- Starring: Margot Kidder; Ian Charleson; Andréa Ferréol
- Cinematography: Michel Brault
- Edited by: Henri Lanoë
- Music by: Claude Bolling
- Production companies: Ciné Louisiana; Films A2; Filmax; RAI TV2
- Distributed by: Les Films René Malo (Quebec); Pan-Canadian Film Distributors (Canada); Parafrance (France)
- Release dates: 24 January 1984 (France); 2 August 1984 (Canada)
- Running time: 186 minutes
- Countries: Canada; France
- Language: English
- Budget: $15 million

Louisiana is a 1984 Franco-Italian - Canadian film directed by Philippe de Broca. The film score was composed by Claude Bolling.

== Synopsis ==
The action is located in Louisiana in the mid-nineteenth century. Virginia will fight to get possession of the Bagatelle estate after it was lost during the American Civil War.

== Cast ==
- Margot Kidder as Virginia Tregan
- Ian Charleson as Clarence Dandridge
- Andréa Ferréol as Mignette
- Lloyd Bochner as Adrien Damvillier
- Victor Lanoux as Charles de Vigors
- Len Cariou as Oswald
- Hilly Hicks as Brent
- Raymond Pellegrin as Morley
- Ken Pogue as Dr. Murphy
- Akosua Busia as Ivy
- Corinne Marchand as Anne McGregor
- James Bearden as Percy Templeton
- Larry Lewis as Adrien II
- Wayne Best as Major McGregor
- Ron L. Lewis as Pierre Damvillier
- Angus MacInnes as Albert
- Alex Liggett as Adrien II, Child
- Matthew Breeding as Pierre, Child
- Scott Burnelle as Fabian
- Kellie Brasselle as Julie
- Tara Winder as Ivy, Child
- Mark Polley as Adrien McGregor I
- Timothy Patterson as Joe "Little Joe"
- Michael J. Reynolds as General Bank
- Ron Cural as Bradley
- Pat Perkins as Nella
- Becki Davis as Betty Templeton
- Valerian Smith as Theodore
- Beata Tyszkiewicz as Comtesse

== Production ==
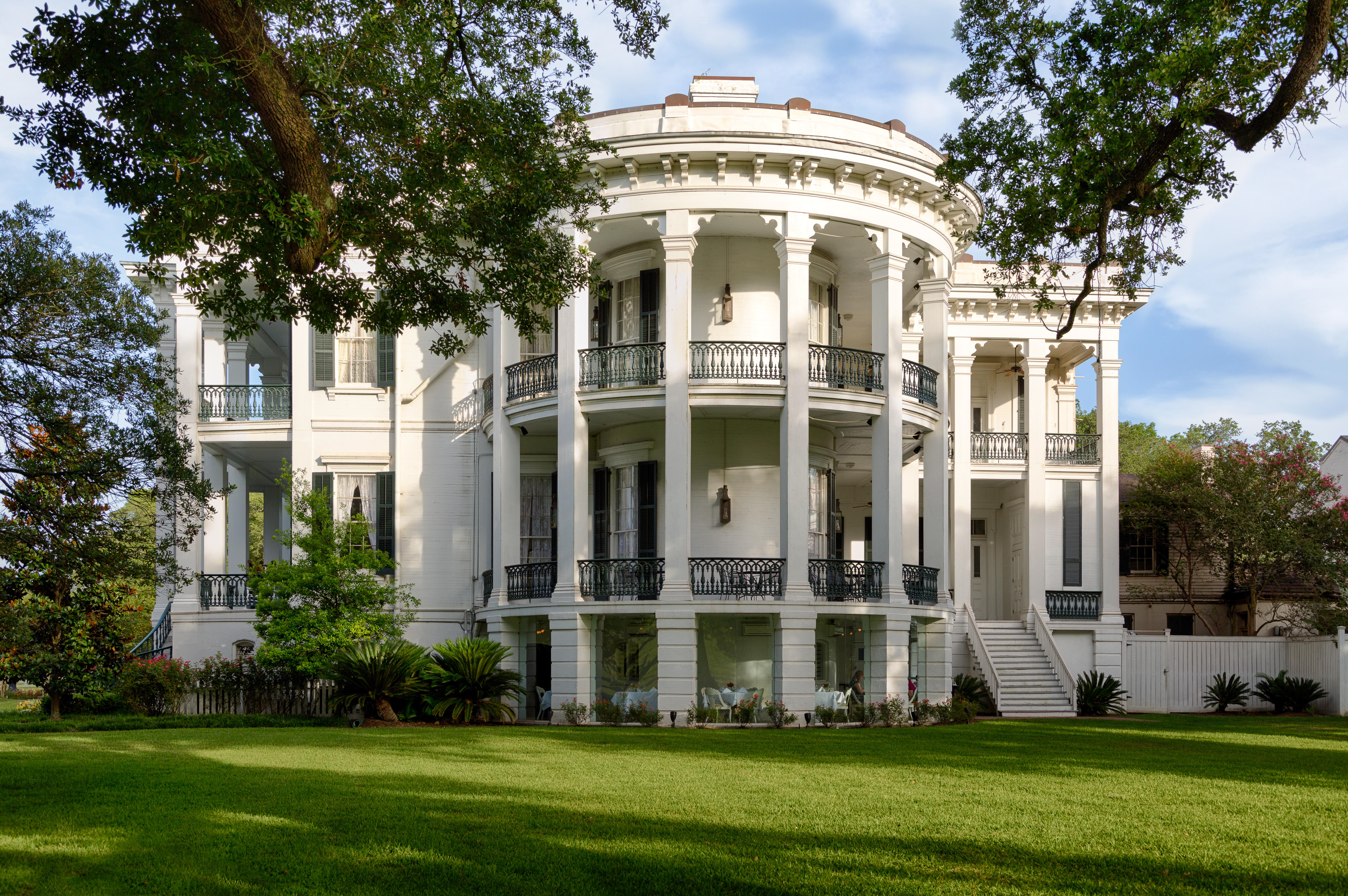
Filming location

John Kemeny and Denis Héroux produced Louisiana. The film had a budget of $13.5 million. A large amount of the budget came from TV pre-sales. and Super Channel, which contributed to three Kemeny and Héroux productions, gave $1.5 million to Louisiana.

Maurice Denuzière's books Louisiane and Fausse Rivière were adapted into a screenplay by Étienne Pèrier, Dominique Fabre, and Charles E. Israel. Both a film and six-hour miniseries were shot, with characters in the miniseries that did not appear in the film version.

Margot Kidder, whose first feature role was in a film produced by Kemeny (The Best Damn Fiddler from Calabogie to Kaladar), was cast to play the lead. Kidder was one of the few people working for the movie with a contractual right to refuse overtime work and utilize it to give time off for fellow workers who did not have the right.

The film was an international coproduction between France and Canada.

The film was shot from 5 April to 31 July 1983, in Saint Francisville, Baton Rouge, New Orleans, and Paris at a cost of $15 million. From 5 April to 3 July the film was shot in Louisiana and shot in Paris from 19 to 31 July. Jacques Demy was the director until 3 May, when he was replaced by Philippe de Broca and left uncredited.

Nottoway Plantation, which Gone with the Wind unsuccessfully attempted to use, was used as a shooting location. There was bad weather on the first day of shooting, a flood that damaged the $500,000 1830s village set, and multiple alligators were near in the house.

== Release ==
Kemeny and Héroux released Louisiana on HBO two years prior to its original release in order to pay for financial losses. Kemeny wanted to scrap the theatrical version of the film and instead release it through HBO and Super Channel, but the operators of Super Channel demanded the contractual obligation be fulfilled. Super Channel sought to regain its investment due to the early HBO release. Super Channel filed an injunction to prevent a bank from paying Kemeny and Héroux's line of credit. They were able to collect their money, but this severed their business connection with Super Channel.

The film was distributed by Les Films René Malo in Quebec, Pan-Canadian Film Distributors in the rest of Canada, and Parafrance in France. It premiered in Paris on 24 January 1984, and released to 37 theatres the next day. The film was shown at the Montreal World Film Festival on 2 August, and released theatrically the next day. The film was 186 minutes long, but was shortened to 128 minutes for its Canadian release.

== Reception ==
Kidder attended the Montreal World Film Festival showing of the film with former Prime Minister Pierre Trudeau. They were critical of the film, primarily its poor editing.

== Works cited ==
- Knelman, Martin (1987). Home Movies: Tales from the Canadian Film World. Key Porter Books. ISBN 1550130498.
- Turner, D. John, ed. (1987). Canadian Feature Film Index: 1913-1985. Canadian Film Institute. ISBN 0660533642.
