= Charming Boys =

1957 film

- Directed by: Henri Decoin
- Written by: Charles Spaak; Dominique Fabre; Etienne Périer
- Produced by: Lucien Masson; Georges Roitfeld; Jacques Roitfeld; Wladimir Roitfeld
- Starring: Zizi Jeanmaire; Daniel Gélin; Henri Vidal
- Cinematography: Pierre Montazel
- Edited by: Claude Durand
- Music by: Georges Van Parys
- Production companies: La Société des Films Sirius; Les Productions Jacques Roitfeld
- Distributed by: La Société des Films Sirius
- Release date: 11 December 1957
- Running time: 113 minutes
- Country: France
- Language: French

Charming Boys (French: Charmants Garçons) is a 1957 French musical comedy film directed by Henri Decoin and starring Zizi Jeanmaire, Daniel Gélin and Henri Vidal. It was one of two Hollywood-style musicals made by Decoin around this time along with Folies-Bergère.

It was shot at the Billancourt Studios in Paris. The film's sets were designed by the art director Robert Clavel. It was made using Technicolor.

== Synopsis ==
Lulu, a nightclub entertainer, has many male admirers who all turn out to be completely unreliable.

== Cast ==
- Zizi Jeanmaire as Lulu Natier
- Daniel Gélin as Alain Cartier
- Henri Vidal as Jo, dit Kid Chabanne - le boxeur
- François Périer as Robert
- Gert Fröbe as Edmond Petersen
- Marie Daëms as Germaine
- Renaud Mary as Henri
- Anne Carrère as Lili
- Albert Médina as Le client volé au palace palace
- René Alié as Le policier au théâtre
- Marius David as Le maître d'hôtel du relais
- André Chanu as Le speaker
- Jacques Morlaine as Un inspecteur
- Jacques Dhéry as Un agent
- Jean Degrave as Le célibataire
- Madeleine Suffel a sAlice - l'habilleuse
- Yves Barsacq as Le détective de l'hôtel
- Jean Lara as Le célibataire
- Pierre Mirat as Un brigadier
- Alain Nobis as Le commissaire à Cannes
- Jean-Pierre Marielle as Le chef de la réception à l'hôtel de Deauville
- Madeleine Lambert as Madame Micoulin
- Jacques Berthier as André Noblet
- Gil Vidal as Max, le gigolo
- Jacques Dacqmine as Charles

== Bibliography ==
- Oscherwitz, Dayna & Higgins, Maryellen. The A to Z of French Cinema. Scarecrow Press, 2009.
