= Fire's Share =

- Directed by: Étienne Périer
- Written by: Dominique Fabre
- Starring: Michel Piccoli; Claudia Cardinale
- Cinematography: Jean Charvein
- Edited by: Jacqueline Thiédot
- Music by: Paul Misraki
- Release date: 1978
- Country: France
- Language: French

Fire's Share (French: La part du feu) is a 1978 French drama film directed by Étienne Périer and starring Michel Piccoli, Claudia Cardinale and Jacques Perrin.

== Plot ==
{{Real estate developer Bob Hansen (Michel Piccoli) discovers that his wife Catherine (Claudia Cardinale) is cheating on him with his business partner. He reacts calmly and even encourages their meetings, thinking that this is the only way to stop losing them both. In order to obtain a building permit for a tower, he bribes Congressman Édouard Moureu, who receives payments into a Swiss bank account. He also notices that the congressman and banker William Vargnier would like to dispense with his services for other lucrative deals, which prompts him to organize the congressman's downfall by exposing him to public condemnation in the columns of a sensationalist newspaper. The congressman is struck down by a heart attack and finds himself in a very serious condition. As for the love affair between his associate Jacques and his wife Catherine, it turns out that it is also the developer Bob Hansen who is controlling Jacques' behavior in order to control his wealthy wife. Indeed, Catherine's blind devotion to Jacques leads her to give him the real estate assets that her husband coveted. When she realizes the scheme she has fallen victim to, she commits suicide by shooting herself in the head after pointing the gun at her husband. Bob appears to be the beneficiary of all the manipulations until the end, when Jacques, who we always thought was under Bob's control, calls the banker to tell him about a project involving his new real estate assets without involving Bob.}}

== Cast ==
- Michel Piccoli as Robert Hansen
- Claudia Cardinale as Catherine Hansen
- Jacques Perrin as Jacques Noblet
- Rufus as Patrick Delbaut
- Roland Bertin as Eduard
- Gabriel Cattand as William de Wallier
- Véronique Silver as Gisèle
- Liliane Gaudet as Madame de Wallier
- Hélène Vincent as The widow
