= Don't Tempt the Devil =

- Directed by: Christian-Jaque
- Written by: Paul Andréota; Christian-Jaque
- Produced by: Georges Cheyko
- Starring: Pierre Brasseur; Marina Vlady
- Cinematography: Armand Thirard
- Music by: Georges Garvarentz
- Distributed by: Variety Distribution
- Release date: 1963
- Language: French

Don't Tempt the Devil (French: Les Bonnes Causes, Italian: Il delitto Dupré) is a 1963 French-Italian crime film written and directed by Christian-Jaque and starring Bourvil, Marina Vlady, Virna Lisi and Pierre Brasseur. It is based on the novel Les Bonnes Causes by Jean Laborde.

== Plot ==
Gina serves as the dedicated nurse to Paul Dupré, a wealthy industrialist undergoing treatment for heart problems. Dupré dies suddenly while receiving an injection administered by Gina. Immediately, his wife Catherine, aided by the renowned lawyer Charles Cassidi—who had a brief affair with her—accuses Gina of foul play. Gina finds herself represented by a novice lawyer, Mr. Philliet, while the investigation falls under the scrutiny of the examining magistrate Albert Gaudet.

As the investigation progresses, Gaudet uncovers a series of troubling coincidences and inconsistencies that seem to implicate Gina. The evident collusion between Catherine Dupré and Cassidi, coupled with Cassidi's past writings on the perfect crime, adds further suspicion. However, just as Gaudet believes he has a crucial witness to incriminate Catherine, he confronts Cassidi, who remains composed despite knowing Catherine's guilt. Struggling with his conscience, Gaudet requests to step down from his role, eventually testifying at the trial in a bid for truth and justice. Despite Gaudet's efforts, Gina receives an eight-year prison sentence.

Shortly after the verdict, Catherine Dupré absconds to the Côte d'Azur with a new lover, leaving Cassidi to realize he has been manipulated. He implores Mr. Philliet to appeal the verdict, swearing to right the injustice done to Gina, who he believes to be innocent.

== Cast ==
- Marina Vlady as Catherine Dupré
- Bourvil as juge Albert Gaudet
- Virna Lisi as Gina Bianchi
- Pierre Brasseur as Mr. Charles Cassidi
- Umberto Orsini as Mr. Philliet
- Jacques Mauclair as Georges Boisset
- Hubert Deschamps as Dr. Mermet
- Raymond Devime as Inspector Véricel
- Jacques Monod as Magnin
- Robert Vidalin as président du tribunal
- Marcel Cuvelier as Morin
- Gilbert Gil as Garat
- Frédéric Pottecher as Himself
- José Luis de Vilallonga as Paul Dupré
- Mony Dalmès as Marjorie
- Hubert Noël as Catherine's Lover
- Bernard Musson as Robert
- Jean-Loup Philippe as Gina's Ex-fiancé
- Daniel Lecourtois as Lawyer
- Robert Berri as Inspector
