= Hot Line (film) =

- American theatrical poster
- Directed by: Etienne Périer
- Written by: Dominique Fabre; Guerdon Trueblood; Paul Jarrico
- Produced by: Alexander Salkind
- Starring: Charles Boyer; Robert Taylor
- Cinematography: Manuel Berenguer
- Music by: Paul Misraki
- Distributed by: American International Pictures (US)
- Release dates: 1967; December 24, 1969 (USA)
- Running time: 96 minutes
- Country: France
- Language: English

Hot Line (US title: The Day the Hot Line Got Hot, French: Le Rouble à deux faces or Le Téléphone rouge) is a 1967 French/Spanish international co-production comedy spy thriller directed by Etienne Périer and starring Robert Taylor in his final feature film and Charles Boyer. It was released in the US by American International Pictures.

== Plot ==
An American and Russian agent find themselves duped by a double agent who works for both of them. Also involved are a naive IBM computer operator and the telephone operator at the hot-line center in Stockholm.

== Cast ==
- Charles Boyer as Vostov, KGB head
- Robert Taylor as Anderson, CIA chief
- George Chakiris as Eric Ericson, Computer Expert with IBM
- Marie Dubois as Natasha
- Gérard Tichy as Truman
- Marta Grau as Old Lady
- Irene D'Astrea as Old Lady
- Josefina Tapias as Old Lady
- Maurice de Canonge as Director of Hotel
- Gustavo Re as Police Chief
- Ilya Salkind as himself

== Bibliography ==
- Blake, Matt; Deal, David (2004). The Eurospy Guide. Baltimore: Luminary Press. ISBN 1-887664-52-1.
