= La Chica =

- Born: Sophie Fustec; Paris, France
- Occupation: Singer
- Years active: 2015-present

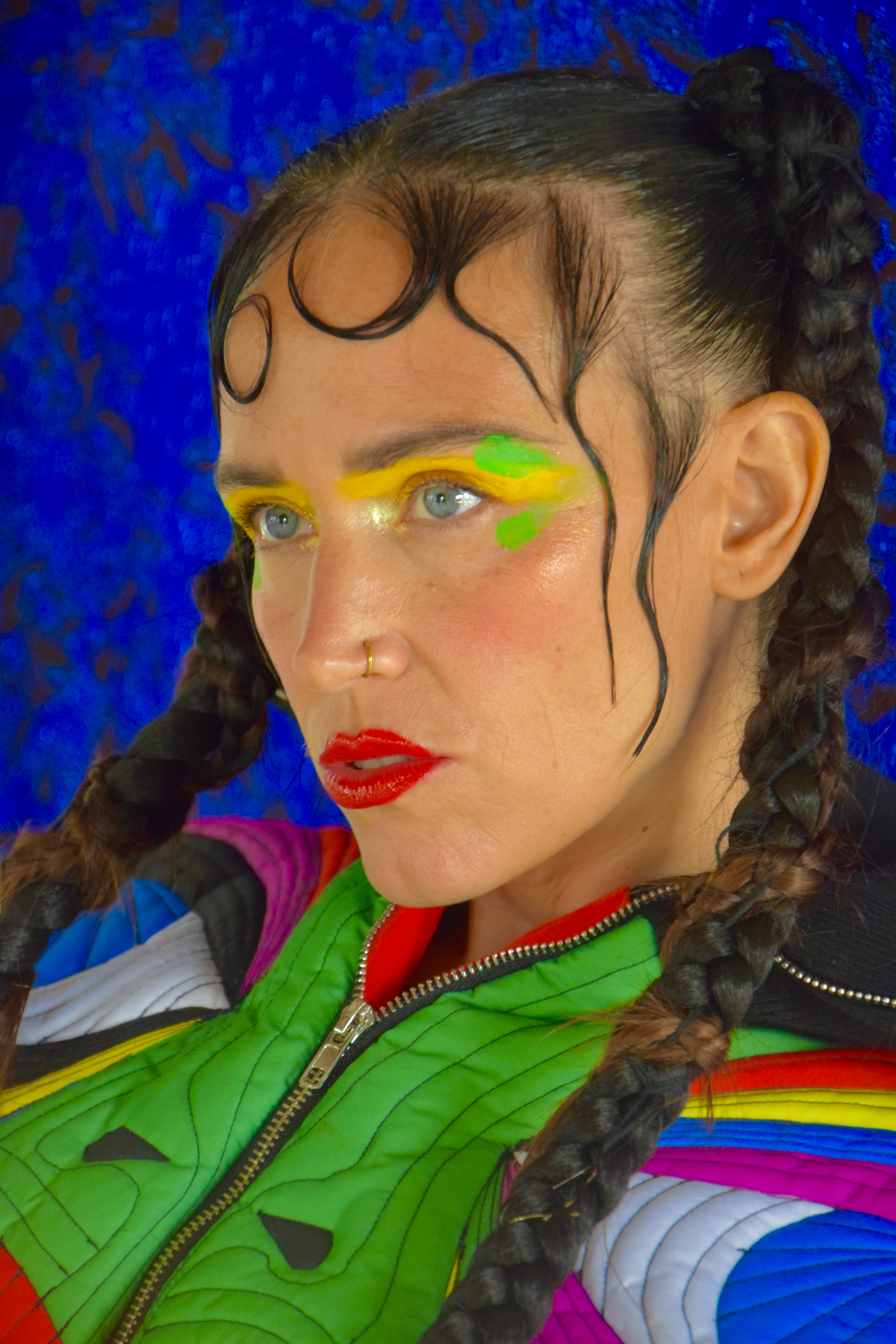
La Chica

Sophie Fustec (born in Paris), better known by her stage name La Chica, is a French-Venezuelan folk singer.

== Biography ==
Fustec was born in Paris to a Venezuelan mother and a French father. She wrote poems and other texts before exploring her musical facet as "La Chica" starting in 2015. According to her, her stage name came from the fact that "when I was a teenager, I used to have a very masculine energy. Once, an uncle started calling me 'chica' to remind me that I was a woman."

In 2020, she released her album Cambio; as she stated in an interview, the title represents "the change I ask from heaven for the situation in Venezuela." On March 19 of that year, she performed the opening concert of the Paris Music Festival at the Cité de l'Architecture et du Patrimoine. Later that year, she released La Loba, dedicated to her deceased brother.

She has lived in France and currently resides in Mexico.

== Discography ==
=== Albums ===
- Cambio (2020)
- La Loba (2020)
- La Chica & El Duende Orchestra (2024) with El Duende

=== EPs ===
- Sapiens Beasts, Vol. 1 (2017)
