= Sergio Gobbi =

Italian-French filmmaker

Sergio Gobbi (born 13 May 1938 in Milan, Italy), born as Sergio Ehrlich, is an Italian-French filmmaker, who was married to Jocelyn Wildenstein.

== Selected filmography ==
=== Theatrical ===
Title	Release Year	Credited as					Notes	Ref(s)
Title	Release Year	Director	Story	Screenwriter	Producer	Other	Notes	Ref(s)
Le Bluffeur	1964	Yes		Yes	Yes			
Le Temps des loups	1970	Yes	Yes	Yes				
Love Me Strangely	1971	Yes						
La Part des lions	1971				Yes			
Menace	1972	Yes	Yes	Yes				
Les Voraces	1973	Yes		Yes				
La Chair de l'orchidée	1975				Yes			
À chacun son enfer	1977					Yes	Executive producer	
Vortex	1976	Yes		Yes				
L'Amour en question	1978					Yes	Executive producer	
Enfantasme	1978	Yes		Yes				
Ciao, les mecs	1979	Yes		Yes				
Asphalt Warriors	1984	Yes		Yes		Yes	Executive producer	
Adieu je t'aime	1988					Yes	Executive producer	
L'Affaire	1994	Yes		Yes				
Les Couleurs du diable	1997				Yes			
Dracula 3D	2012					Yes	Co-producer	
Cristo Rey	2014					Yes	Executive producer	
