= Faces of Love (1977 film) =

1977 Swiss French drama directed by Michel Soutter

- Directed by: Michel Soutter
- Screenplay by: Michel Soutter
- Produced by: Yves Gasser; Yves Peyrot
- Starring: Jean-Louis Trintignant; Delphine Seyrig; Lea Massari; Valérie Mairesse
- Cinematography: Renato Berta
- Edited by: Albert Jurgenson
- Music by: Arié Dzierlatka
- Distributed by: Gaumont Distribution
- Release date: 16 November 1977
- Running time: 90 minutes
- Country: France
- Language: French

Faces of Love (French: Repérages) is a 1977 Swiss French drama directed by Michel Soutter. The film, about three actresses in a film of Chekhov's Three Sisters and their relationship with a film director, has autobiographical references.

== Cast ==
- Jean-Louis Trintignant as Victor
- Delphine Seyrig as Julie
- Lea Massari as Cecilia
- Valérie Mairesse as Esther
- Roger Jendly as Jean Vallée
- François Rochaix as Ambrosio

== Accolades ==
Year	Award	Category	Recipient	Result
1978	César Award	Best Actress	Delphine Seyrig	Nominated
1978	César Award	Best Supporting Actress	Valérie Mairesse	Nominated
