= Jean Laborde (journalist) =

French journalist and novelist

Jean Laborde (9 December 1918 – 30 January 2007) was a French journalist and writer.

He was born in Lyon on 9 December 1918. He wrote some twenty books, under his own name and pen names. Several of his books were adapted for the cinema.

He died in Biarritz on 30 January 2007, aged 88.

== Works ==
=== Books ===
- Amour, que de crimes (1954)
- Un homme à part entière (1961)
- L'Héritage de violence (1969) (winner of the Maison de la Presse Prize)
- Le Moindre Mal (1971)
- Heureux les corrompus (1974)

=== Theater ===
- Peur sur la ville, directed by Henri Verneuil in 1975

== Film adaptations ==
- Les Bonnes Causes (1960), directed by Christian-Jaque in 1963
- The Second Twin, directed by Christian-Jaque in 1966
- Les Assassins de l'ordre (1956), directed by Marcel Carné in 1971
- Le Pacha directed by Georges Lautner in 1968
- Mort d'un pourri, also directed by Georges Lautner in 1977.
