= Rosette (politics) =

Accessory worn by campaigning politicians

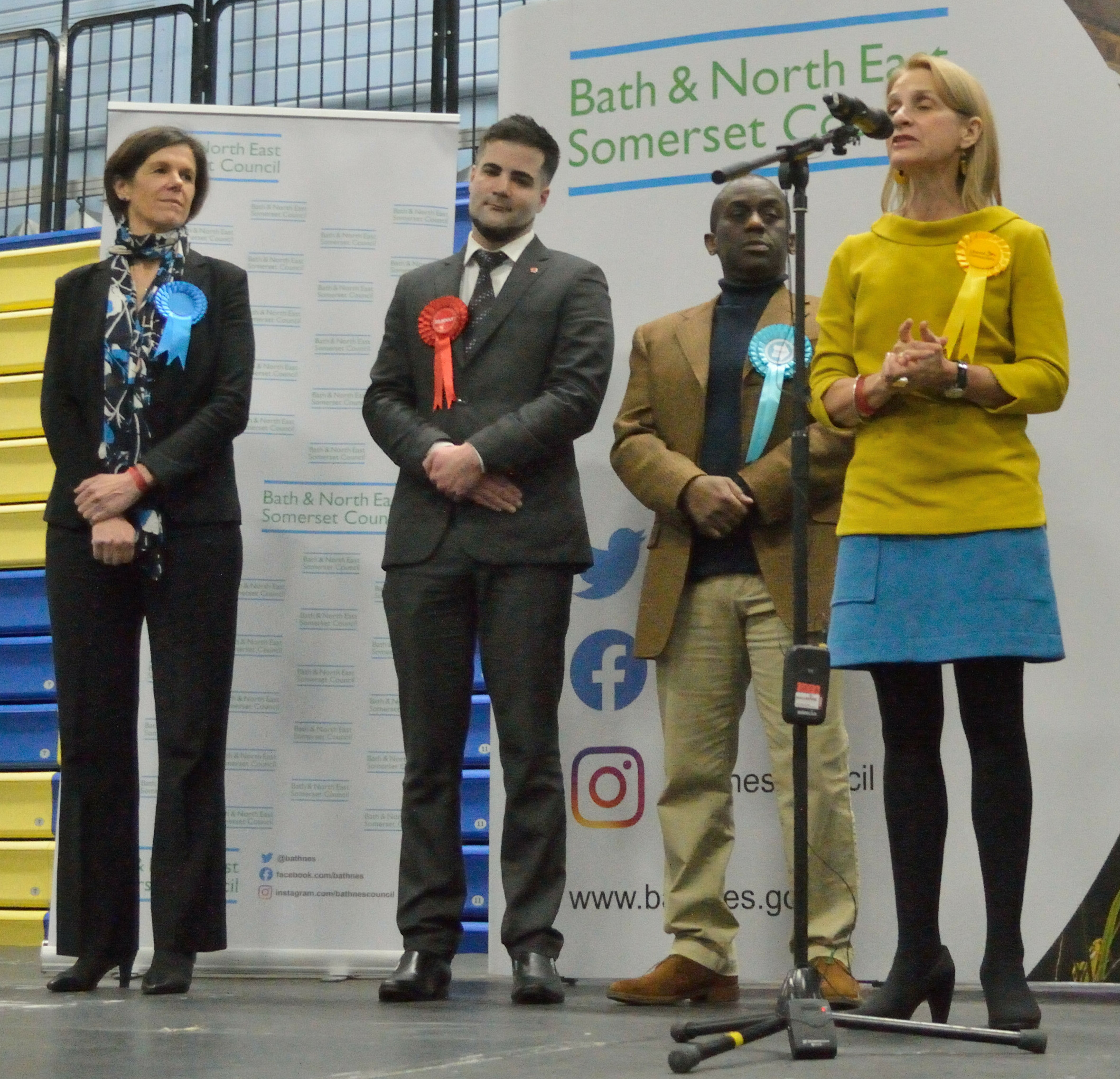
An election declaration for the UK 2019 general election, with four candidates wearing rosettes. Left to right: Conservative, Labour, Brexit, Liberal Democrat

A rosette is a fabric decoration worn by political candidates to identify themselves as belonging to a particular party. The rosette, worn on the chest or suit jacket, will show the colour or colours of the political party that the candidate represents. Rosettes are worn by campaigning politicians in the United Kingdom, New Zealand and some other countries.

== Standard colours and emblems ==
In the UK, the most commonly seen colours of rosettes are:

- Red for Labour
- Blue for Conservative and UUP
- Amber for Liberal Democrats
- Green for Green Party
- Yellow for SNP
- Red, white and blue for DUP and Traditional Unionist Voice (which are pro-Union parties in NI)
- Green and orange for Plaid Cymru
- Turquoise Blue for Reform UK
- Purple for UK Independence Party and Co-operative Party
- White for Yorkshire Party

In similar fashion, candidates wearing suits to their election counts will often wear a tie of their party's corresponding colour. Coloured flowers are also sometimes used, particularly in the case of the red rose as a symbol of the Labour Party; this has been common since the 1980s when leaders Neil Kinnock and Tony Blair encouraged their use, and Labour adopted the red rose as the party's logo.

Monster Raving Loony Party candidates may satirise the practice by wearing oversized rosettes of various colours.

== History ==
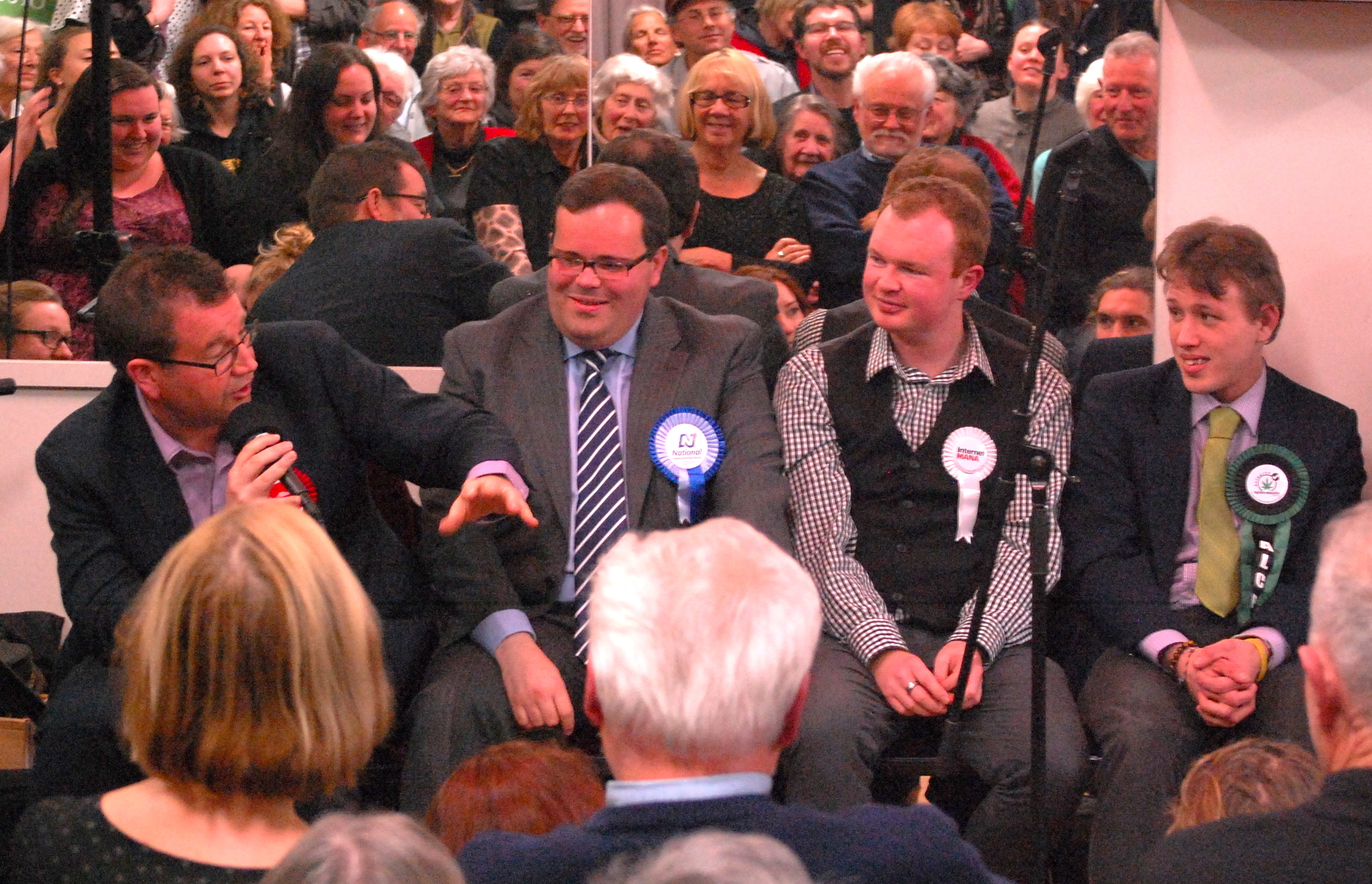
2014 New Zealand general election, Aro Valley. Left to right: Labour, National, Internet Mana, Cannabis

When political parties emerged in the UK, they used different colours in different areas. This may have been for a variety of reasons, such as association of colours with leading families of the area and then the political parties they supported. In some areas, non-standard colours were worn up to around the 1970s as a local tradition. Major political parties have now standardised on the colours used nationally, a trend accelerated by the arrival of colour television.

The wearing of rosettes in and around polling stations is strictly regulated by the Electoral Commission. Rosettes can be worn by activist tellers working for the party and can display the name of a candidate, emblem or description, but cannot be oversized or display a political slogan, nor can tellers wear or carry anything else "that carries any writing, picture or sign relating to any candidate...apart from a rosette". In 2008, the Commission stipulated that rosettes greater than four inches in diameter were not allowed to be worn in polling stations.

In Labour and Conservative safe seats, a common saying is that a pig or monkey in a red or blue rosette would win an election in that seat (cf. yellow dog Democrat).

== See also ==
- Cockade
- Political uniform
- List of political party symbols
