= Bruno Gantillon =

French film director and screenwriter

Bruno Gantillon (born 16 June 1944, in Annemasse), is a French film director and screenwriter.

Bruno Gantillon is the grandson of Simon Gantillon. From the 1980s onwards, he worked mainly for television.

== Filmography ==
Assistant director

- 1970: Cannabis, directed by Pierre Koralnik

Director

- 1970: Un couple d'artistes
- 1971: Morgane et ses nymphes
- 1972: Le Self-service du nu
- 1972: Sans sommation
- 1976: Cinéma 16, episode: La maison d'Albert
- 1977: Cinéma 16, episode: L'amuseur
- 1977: Servante et maîtresse (English title: Servant and Mistress)
- 1978: Zigzags
- 1979: Les Héritiers, episode: Les régisseurs
- 1979: Médecins de nuit, 2 episodes: Légitime défense and Léone (TV series)
- 1980: Cinéma 16, episode: L'homme aux chiens
- 1981: Les Héritiers, episode: Les femmes du lac
- 1981: Non lieu
- 1983: Capitaine X
- 1985: Machinations
- 1985: L'Intruse 2
- 1987: Les Mémés sanglantes
- 1989: Le Masque, episode: Les dames du Creusot
- 1989–1991: The Hitchhiker, episodes:
  - Living a lie
  - Homecoming
  - Part of me
  - Square deal
  - Code Liz
- 1989: Le Dernier Virus
- 1991: Le Triplé gagnant, episode: Fado pour une jeune fille
- 1992: La Scène finale
- 1992: Counterstrike, episodes:
  - Bastille day terror
  - Til death do us part
  - Ripped from the grave
- 1993: Ferbac, episode: Le crime de Ferbac
- 1994: Le Travail du furet
- 1994: Highlander, episode: Warmonger
- 1994: Commissaire Chabert: Mort d'une fugitive
- 1995: Les Derniers Jours de la victime
- 1995: Le Dernier Voyage
- 1995: Dock des anges
- 1995: En danger de vie
- 1996: La Chica
- 1996: La Poupée qui tue
- 1997: En danger de vie
- 1998: Frères et Flics
- 2000: La Passion Schliemann
- 2000: Entre l'arbre et l'écorce
- 2001: Le Marathon du lit
- 2001: Maigret, episode: Mon ami Maigret
- 2004–2006: Léa Parker, episodes:
  - Virus
  - La Liste noire
  - Ondes mortelles
  - Hôtel de luxe
  - Effet de serre
- 2005: Le Meilleur Commerce du monde
- 2005–2006: Fabien Cosma, episodes:
  - Grain de sable
  - Syndrome d'imposture
- 2005–2007: Louis la Brocante
  - Louis et les Deux Mousquetaires
  - Louis et la Chorale
  - Louis n'en dort plus
  - Louis joue les experts
- 2006–2008: Sous le soleil, episodes:
  - Le prix du succès
  - Des parents envahissants
  - Mariage en danger
  - La Révélation
  - La Fille de mes rêves
  - La Femme aux deux visages
- 2008: Disparitions
- 2010: Le Sang des Atrides (telefilm)
- 2011: Le Tombeau d'Hélios (telefilm)

Screenwriter

- 1972: Sans sommation
- 1985: L'Intruse 2
- 1996: La Chica
