= Pierre Granier-Deferre =

French film director and screenwriter (1927-2007)

- Born: 2 July 1927; Paris, France
- Died: 16 November 2007 (aged 80)
- Occupations: Film director, screenwriter
- Spouse(s): Annie Fratellini (m. 1954; div. 19??) Susan Hampshire (m. 1967; div. 1974)
- Children: 6, including Denys Granier-Deferre

Pierre Granier-Deferre (2 July 1927 – 16 November 2007) was a French film director and screenwriter.

His 1971 film Le Chat (The Cat) won the Best Actor and Best Actress awards at the 21st Berlin International Film Festival. His 1964 film The Adventures of Salavin won the Silver Shell for Best Actor at the 12th San Sebastian International Film Festival.

== Family ==
Granier-Deferre married Annie Fratellini, who starred in his film La Métamorphose des cloportes. They had one daughter.

He had two children with his second wife, Susan Hampshire, an English actress: a son, Christopher Granier-Deferre, a producer and director, and a daughter who died shortly after birth. Granier-Deferre is also the father of Denys Granier-Deferre, a director/actor, whose mother is Denise Leve.

He is also the father to three other daughters.

== Filmography ==
[D] = Director; [W] = Writer

- 1962: Le Petit garçon de l'ascenseur [D], [W]
- 1964: The Adventures of Salavin
- 1965: La Métamorphose des cloportes [D], [W], with Lino Ventura, Charles Aznavour
- 1965: Paris in August [D], [W], with Charles Aznavour
- 1967: Le Grand Dadais [D], [W]
- 1970: La Horse [D], [W], with Jean Gabin
- 1971: Le Chat [D], [W], with Jean Gabin, Simone Signoret
- 1971: La Veuve Couderc [D], [W], with Simone Signoret, Alain Delon
- 1973: Le Fils [D], [W], with Yves Montand
- 1973: Le Train [D], [W], with Jean-Louis Trintignant, Romy Schneider
- 1974: La Race des seigneurs [D], [W], with Alain Delon
- 1975: La Cage [D], [W], with Lino Ventura, Ingrid Thulin
- 1975: Adieu poulet [D], with Lino Ventura, Patrick Dewaere
- 1976: Une femme à sa fenêtre [D], [W], with Romy Schneider
- 1976: Le Toubib [D], [W], with Alain Delon, Véronique Jannot
- 1981: Une étrange affaire [D], [W], with Gérard Lanvin, Michel Piccoli
- 1982: L'Étoile du Nord [D], [W], with Simone Signoret, Philippe Noiret
- 1983: L'Ami de Vincent [D], [W], with Philippe Noiret, Jean Rochefort, Françoise Fabian
- 1985: L'Homme aux yeux d'argent [D], [W], with Alain Souchon
- 1986: Cours privé [D], [W], with Michel Aumont, Élizabeth Bourgine
- 1987: Noyade interdite [D], [W], with Philippe Noiret
- 1988: La Couleur du vent [D]
- 1990: L'Autrichienne [D], with Ute Lemper
- 1995: Le Petit Garçon [D]
- 1992: la Voix [D], [W]
- 1992: Archipel [D], [W]
- 1995: Maigret et la vente à la bougie (TV) [D], [W], with Bruno Cremer
- 1996: La Dernière Fête (TV) [D], [W], with Bruno Cremer
- 1997: Maigret et l'enfant de chœur (TV) [D], [W], with Bruno Cremer
- 2001: Maigret et la fenêtre ouverte (TV) [D], with Bruno Cremer
