= Étienne Périer (director) =

Belgian film director (1931–2020)

- Born: 11 December 1931; Brussels, Belgium
- Died: 21 June 2020 (aged 88); Le Plan-de-la-Tour, France
- Occupation: film director

Étienne Périer (French pronunciation: [etjɛn peʁje]; 11 December 1931 – 21 June 2020) was a Belgian film director.

== Filmography ==
=== Director ===
- 1956 : Bernard Buffet
- 1959 : Bobosse, with Micheline Presle and François Périer
- 1960 : Murder at 45 R.P.M., with Danielle Darrieux, Michel Auclair, Jean Servais
- 1961 : Bridge to the Sun, with Carroll Baker and James Shigeta
- 1962 : Swordsman of Siena, with Stewart Granger, Sylva Koscina and Christine Kaufmann
- 1965 : Dis-moi qui tuer, with Michèle Morgan and Paul Hubschmid
- 1967 : Des garçons et des filles, with Nicole Garcia, Ludmila Mikaël, music from Jean Michel Jarre
- 1968 : Hot Line, with Robert Taylor, Charles Boyer, George Chakiris, Marie Dubois
- 1971 : When Eight Bells Toll, with Anthony Hopkins, Robert Morley, Nathalie Delon and Jack Hawkins
- 1971 : Zeppelin, with Michael York and Elke Sommer
- 1972 : Un meurtre est un meurtre, with Stéphane Audran, Michel Serrault, Robert Hossein and Jean-Claude Brialy
- 1974 : La Main à couper, with Lea Massari, Michel Serrault, Michel Bouquet and Bernard Blier
- 1978 : Fire's Share, with Claudia Cardinale, Michel Piccoli, Jacques Perrin
- 1979 : Un si joli village, with Victor Lanoux and Jean Carmet
- 1981 : Confused Feelings (TV), with Michel Piccoli as the professor and Pierre Malet as Roland
- 1985 : La dérapade (TV), with Christophe Malavoy
- 1985 : L'Ordre (TV), with Pierre Malet and Irina Brook
- 1988 : La Garçonne (TV), with Marie Trintignant
- 1989 : Rosso veneziano, with Vincent Spano, Victor Lanoux, Wojciech Pszoniak and Andréa Ferréol
- 1991 : À la vie, à l'amour (TV)
- 1993 : Maigret et l'homme du banc (TV)
- 1993 : La Vérité en face (TV), with Claude Rich as Paul Noblet and Danielle Darrieux
- 1994 : La Balle perdue (TV)
- 1994 : Samson le magnifique (TV), with Charlotte Rampling as Isabelle de Marsac and Roger Hanin
- 1997 : La Rumeur (TV)
- 1998 : Le Dernier Fils (TV)
- 2000 : Que reste-t-il... (TV), with Danielle Darrieux
- 2004 : Table rase (TV), with Christophe Malavoy

=== Screenwriter ===
- Charming Boys (1957)
