= Dominique Fabre =

French novelist (born 1960)

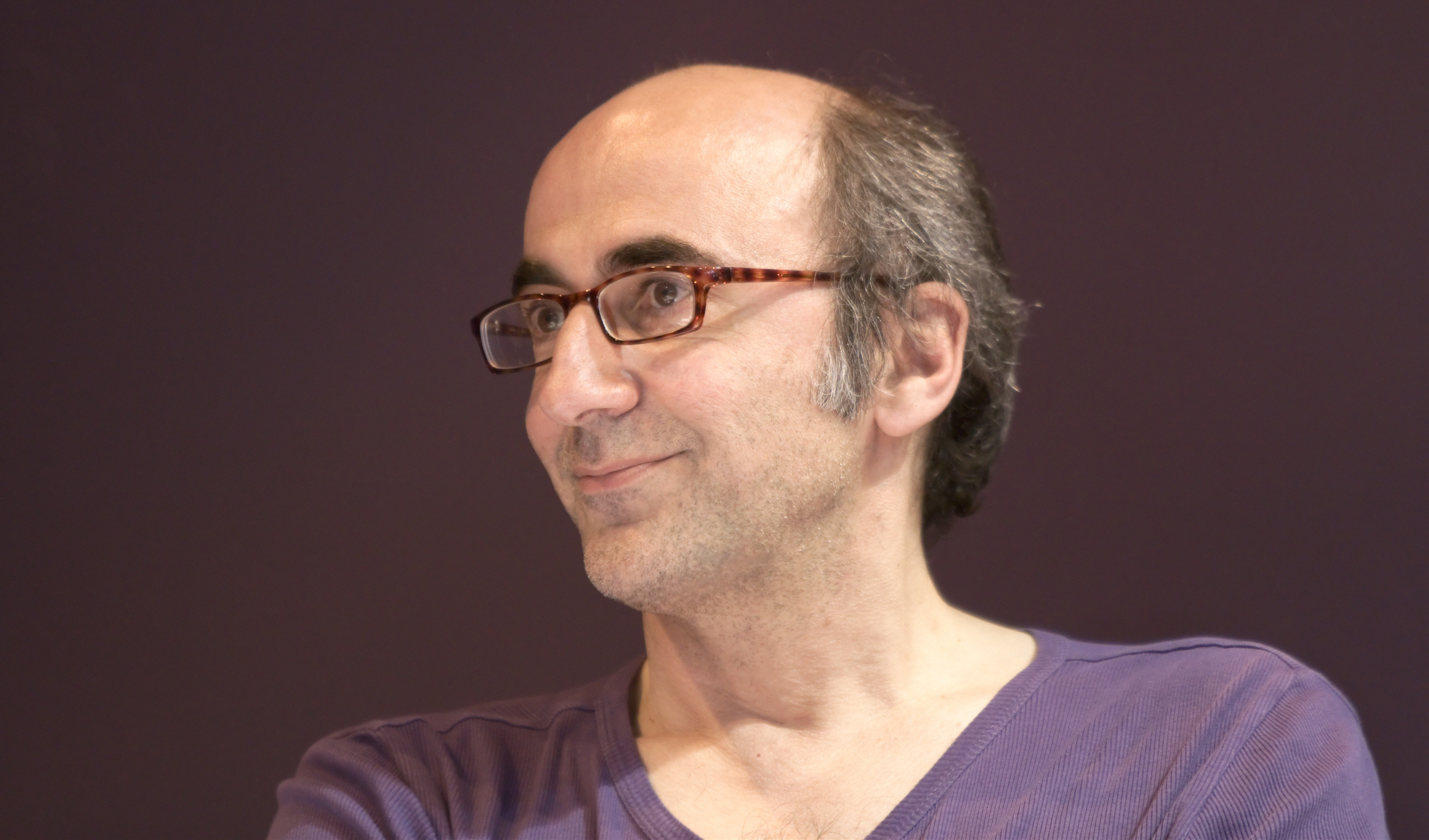
- Fabre in March 2010
- Born: 1960 (age 65–66); Paris, France
- Occupations: Novelist, teacher
- Writing career
- Language: French
- Notable awards: Prix Louis Barthou (2003); Prix Eugène Dabit du roman populiste (2014)

Dominique Fabre (French pronunciation: [dɔminik fabʁ]; born 1960) is a French novelist who focuses "on the lives of individuals on the margins of society."

== Life ==
Fabre was born in Paris in 1960. He studied philosophy and spent time in the United States in the 1980s. He has taught English in the Paris suburbs since 1993. Besides novels, he writes short stories and poetry. His first novel, Moi aussi un jour j'irai loin, was published in 1995.

Mon quartier received a silver medal of the Académie française's Prix Louis Barthou in 2003. In 2014 he won the Prix Eugène Dabit du roman populiste for Photos volées. Three of his novels have been published in English: The Waitress Was New (2008), Guys Like Me (2015) and My Life as Edgar (2023).

== Books ==
- Moi aussi un jour j'irai loin, 1995
- Ma vie d'Edgar, 1998
  - My Life as Edgar, 2023 (English trans. Anna Lehmann, Archipelago Books)
- Celui qui n'est pas là, 1999
- Fantômes, 2001
- Mon quartier, 2002
- Pour une femme de son âge, 2003
- La serveuse était nouvelle, 2005
  - The Waitress Was New, 2008 (English trans. Jordan Stump, Archipelago Books)
- Le Perron, 2006
- Les Types comme moi, 2007
  - Guys Like Me, 2015 (English trans. Howard Curtis, New Vessel Press)
- J'attends l'extinction des feux, 2008
- Les Prochaines Vacances, 2008
- Avant les monstres, 2009
- J'aimerais revoir Callaghan, 2010
- Il faudrait s'arracher le cœur, 2012
- Des nuages et des tours, 2013
- Photos volées, 2014
- Je t'emmènerai danser chez Lavorel, 2014
- La Mallette/Quand on a des blessures, les pas sont plus lents/Choses qui, 2014
- En passant (vite fait) par la montagne, 2015
- Les Soirées chez Mathilde, 2017
- Les Enveloppes transparentes, 2018
- Le Grand Détour, 2018
- Je veux rentrer chez moi, 2019
- Aujourd'hui, 2021
- Une enfance, 2021
- Trois passagers, 2022
