= 1st César Awards =

1976 French film awards ceremony

- Date: 3 April 1976
- Site: Palais des congrès, Paris, France
- Hosted by: Pierre Tchernia

Highlights
- Best Film: Le Vieux Fusil
- Best Actor: Philippe Noiret
- Best Actress: Romy Schneider

Television coverage
- Network: Antenne 2

The 1st César Awards ceremony, presented by the Académie des Arts et Techniques du Cinéma, honoured the best French films of 1975 and took place on 3 April 1976 at the Palais des congrès in Paris. The ceremony was chaired by Jean Gabin and hosted by Pierre Tchernia. Le Vieux Fusil won the award for Best Film.

== Winners and nominees ==
The winners are denoted in bold.

| **Best Film** **Le Vieux Fusil**: Cousin, cousine; Let Joy Reign Supreme; 7 morts sur ordonnance | **Best Director** **Bertrand Tavernier** – **Let Joy Reign Supreme**: François Truffaut – The Story of Adele H.; Jean-Paul Rappeneau – Lovers Like Us; Robert Enrico – Le Vieux Fusil |
| **Best Actor** **Philippe Noiret** – **Le Vieux Fusil**: Victor Lanoux – Cousin, cousine; Jean-Pierre Marielle – Cookies; Gérard Depardieu – 7 morts sur ordonnance | **Best Actress** **Romy Schneider** – **That Most Important Thing: Love**: Isabelle Adjani – The Story of Adele H.; Delphine Seyrig – India Song; Catherine Deneuve – Lovers Like Us |
| **Best Actor in a Supporting Role** **Jean Rochefort** – **Let Joy Reign Supreme**: Patrick Dewaere – The French Detective; Victor Lanoux – The French Detective; Jean Bouise – Le Vieux fusil | **Best Actress in a Supporting Role** **Marie-France Pisier** – **Cousin, cousine** and **French Provincial**: Isabelle Huppert – Aloise; Andréa Ferréol – Cookies; Christine Pascal – Let Joy Reign Supreme |
| **Best Screenplay, Dialogue or Adaptation** **Let Joy Reign Supreme** – **Bertrand Tavernier** and **Jean Aurenche**: Cousin, cousine – Jean Charles Tacchella; 7 morts sur ordonnance – Jacques Rouffio and Georges Conchon; Le Vieux fusil – Robert Enrico and Pascal Jardin | **Best Music** **François de Roubaix** – **Le Vieux Fusil**: Carlos d'Alessio – India Song; Philippe II, Duke of Orléans and Antoine Duhamel – Let Joy Reign Supreme; Olivier Toussaint and Paul de Senneville – Un linceul n'a pas de poches |
| **Best Cinematography** **Sven Nykvist** – **Black Moon**: Pierre Lhomme – Lovers Like Us and La Chair de l'orchidée; Étienne Becker – Le Vieux fusil | **Best Production Design** **Pierre Guffroy** – **Let Joy Reign Supreme**: Richard Peduzzi – La Chair de l'orchidée; Jean-Pierre Kohut-Svelko – The Story of Adele H. and That Most Important Thing: Love |
| **Best Editing** **Geneviève Winding** – **7 morts sur ordonnance**: Jean Ravel – The French Detective; Christiane Lack – That Most Important Thing: Love; Marie-Josèphe Yoyotte – Lovers Like Us; Eva Zora – Le Vieux fusil | **Best Sound** **Nara Kollery** – **Black Moon**: Harrik Maury and Harald Maury – Hu-man; Michel Vionnet – India Song; Bernard Aubouy – Le Vieux fusil |
**Best Foreign Film** **Parfum de femme** (Profumo di donna): Aguirre, the Wrath of God; Nashville; The Magic Flute
**Honorary César** **Ingrid Bergman**; **Diana Ross**

== See also ==
- 48th Academy Awards
- 29th British Academy Film Awards
