= 4th César Awards =

1979 French film awards ceremony

- Date: 3 February 1979
- Site: Salle Pleyel, Paris, France
- Hosted by: Pierre Tchernia and Jean-Claude Brialy

Highlights
- Best Film: L'Argent des autres
- Best Actor: Michel Serrault
- Best Actress: Romy Schneider

Television coverage
- Network: Antenne 2

The 4th César Awards ceremony, presented by the Académie des Arts et Techniques du Cinéma, honoured the best French films of 1978 and took place on 3 February 1979 at the Salle Pleyel in Paris. The ceremony was chaired by Charles Vanel and hosted by Pierre Tchernia and Jean-Claude Brialy. L'Argent des autres won the award for Best Film.

== Winners and nominees ==
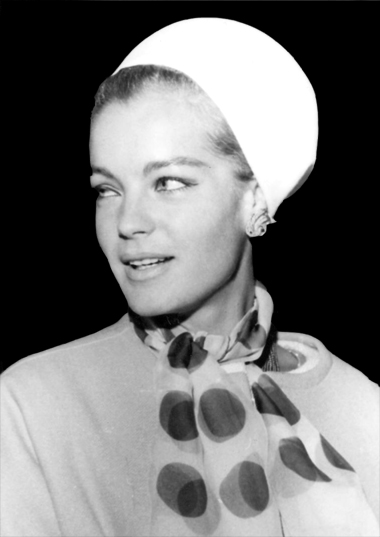
Romy Schneider, Best Actress winner

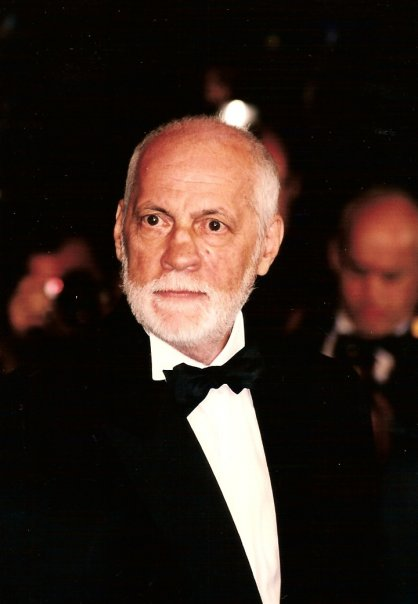
Michel Serrault, Best Actor winner

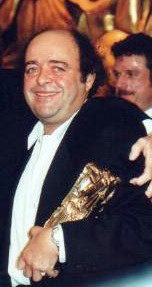
Jacques Villeret, Best Supporting Actor winner

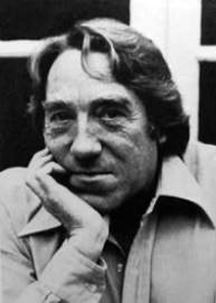
Georges Delerue, Best Original Music winner

Best Film L'Argent des autres: Dossier 51; Molière; A Simple Story	Best Director Christian de Chalonge – L'Argent des autres: Michel Deville – Dossier 51; Ariane Mnouchkine – Molière; Claude Sautet – A Simple Story
Best Actor Michel Serrault – La Cage aux folles: Jean Carmet – Le Sucre; Gérard Depardieu – Le Sucre; Claude Brasseur – A Simple Story	Best Actress Romy Schneider – A Simple Story: Annie Girardot – The Key Is in the Door; Anouk Aimée – Mon premier amour; Isabelle Huppert – Violette Nozière
Best Supporting Actor Jacques Villeret – Robert et Robert: Michel Serrault – L'Argent des autres; Jean Carmet – Le Sucre; Claude Brasseur – A Simple Story	Best Supporting Actress Stéphane Audran – Violette Nozière: Nelly Borgeaud – Le Sucre; Arlette Bonnard – A Simple Story; Éva Darlan – A Simple Story
Best Screenplay, Dialogue or Adaptation Dossier 51 – Gilles Perrault and Michel Deville: L'Argent des autres – Christian de Chalonge, Pierre Dumayet; Le Sucre – Georges Conchon, Jacques Rouffio; A Simple Story – Jean-Loup Dabadie, Claude Sautet	Best Animated Short Film Rowing Across the Atlantic: L'Anatomiste; Le Phénomène
Best Cinematography Bernard Zitzermann – Molière: Néstor Almendros – The Green Room; Pierre Lhomme – Judith Therpauve; Jean Boffety – A Simple Story	Best Editing Raymonde Guyot – Dossier 51: Jean Ravel – L'Argent des autres; Henri Lanoë – Butterfly on the Shoulder; Geneviève Winding – The Savage State
Best Sound William Robert Sivel – The Savage State: Harald Maury – Judith Therpauve; Alix Comte – Molière; Pierre Lenoir – A Simple Story	Best Original Music Georges Delerue – Get Out Your Handkerchiefs: Antoine Duhamel – The Song of Roland; Philippe Sarde – A Simple Story; Pierre Jansen – Violette Nozière
Best Production Design Guy-Claude François – Molière: François de Lamothe – One Two Two; Théobald Meurisse – Dirty Dreamer; Jacques Brizzio – Violette Nozière	Best Documentary Short Film L'Arbre vieux: Chaotilop; Tibesti Too
Best Fiction Short Film Dégustation maison: Mr. Michel's Dog; Jeudi 7 avril; L'Ornière	Best Foreign Film The Tree of Wooden Clogs: Autumn Sonata; Julia; A Wedding
Honorary César Marcel Carné; Walt Disney; Charles Vanel

== See also ==
- 51st Academy Awards
- 32nd British Academy Film Awards
