= César Award for Best Film =

French film award

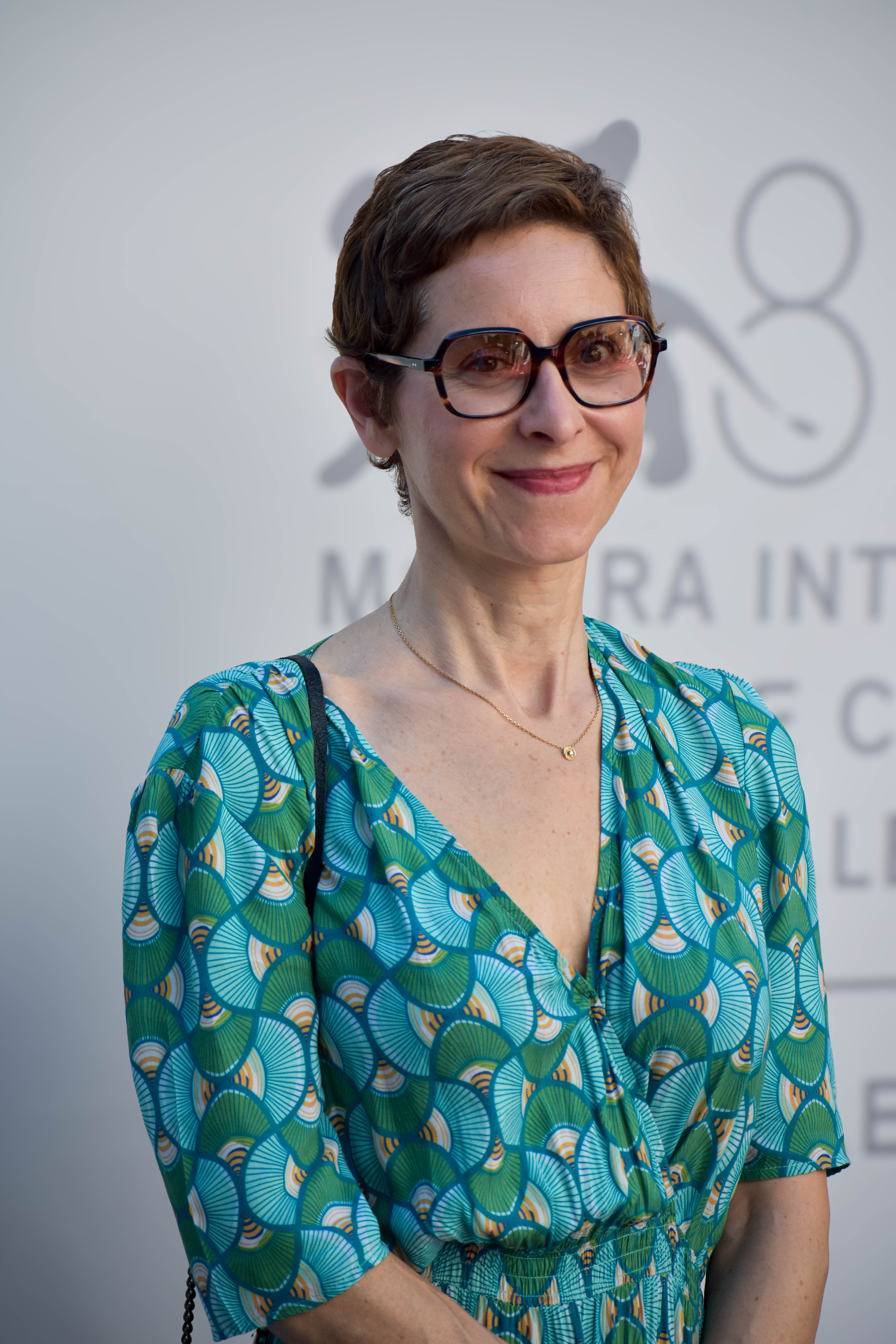
- 2026 recipient: Carine Tardieu
- Awarded for: Best Film of the Year
- Country: France
- Presented by: Académie des Arts et Techniques du Cinéma
- First award: 1976
- Currently held by: The Ties That Bind Us (2026)
- Website: academie-cinema.org

The winners and nominees of the César Award for Best Film (French: César du meilleur film).

== Winners and nominees ==
=== 1970s ===
Year	English title	Original title	Director
1976	The Old Gun	Le Vieux Fusil	Robert Enrico
1976	Cousin, Cousine	Cousin, cousine	Jean Charles Tacchella
1976	Let Joy Reign Supreme	Que la fête commence	Bertrand Tavernier
1976	7 morts sur ordonnance	7 morts sur ordonnance	Jacques Rouffio
1977	Mr. Klein	Monsieur Klein	Joseph Losey
1977	Barocco		André Téchiné
1977	The Best Way to Walk	La Meilleure Façon de marcher	Claude Miller
1977	The Judge and the Assassin	Le Juge et l'assassin	Bertrand Tavernier
1978	Providence		Alain Resnais
1978	Drummer-Crab	Le Crabe-Tambour	Pierre Schoendoerffer
1978	The Lacemaker	La Dentellière	Claude Goretta
1978	We Will All Meet in Paradise	Nous irons tous au paradis	Yves Robert
1979	Other People's Money	L'Argent des autres	Christian de Chalonge
1979	Dossier 51	Le Dossier 51	Michel Deville
1979	Molière		Ariane Mnouchkine
1979	A Simple Story	Une histoire simple	Claude Sautet

=== 1980s ===
Year	English title	Original title	Director
1980	Tess		Roman Polanski
1980	Don Giovanni		Joseph Losey
1980	I as in Icarus	I... comme Icare	Henri Verneuil
1980	Womanlight	Clair de femme	Costa Gavras
1981	The Last Metro	Le Dernier Métro	François Truffaut
1981	Loulou		Maurice Pialat
1981	My American Uncle	Mon oncle d'Amérique	Alain Resnais
1981	Slow Motion (a.k.a. Every Man for Himself)	Sauve qui peut (la vie)	Jean-Luc Godard
1982	Quest for Fire	La Guerre du feu	Jean-Jacques Annaud
1982	Clean Up (a.k.a. Clean Slate)	Coup de torchon	Bertrand Tavernier
1982	Dance of Life	Les Uns et les autres	Claude Lelouch
1982	Under Suspicion	Garde à vue	Claude Miller
1983	The Nark	La Balance	Bob Swaim
1983	Danton		Andrzej Wajda
1983	Passion		Jean-Luc Godard
1983	A Room in Town	Une chambre en ville	Jacques Demy
1984	The Ball	Le Bal	Ettore Scola
1984	To Our Love	À nos amours	Maurice Pialat
1984	Between Us	Entre nous (a.k.a. Coup de foudre)	Diane Kurys
1984	One Deadly Summer	L'Été meurtrier	Jean Becker
1984	So Long, Stooge	Tchao pantin	Claude Berri
1985	My New Partner	Les Ripoux	Claude Zidi
1985	Carmen		Francesco Rosi
1985	Full Moon in Paris	Les Nuits de la pleine lune	Éric Rohmer
1985	Love Unto Death	L'Amour à mort	Alain Resnais
1985	A Sunday in the Country	Un dimanche à la campagne	Bertrand Tavernier
1986	Three Men and a Cradle	3 hommes et un couffin	Coline Serreau
1986	Death in a French Garden	Péril en la demeure	Michel Deville
1986	Impudent Girl	L'Effrontée	Claude Miller
1986	Subway		Luc Besson
1986	Vagabond	Sans toit ni loi	Agnès Varda
1987	Thérèse		Alain Cavalier
1987	Betty Blue	37°2 le matin	Jean-Jacques Beineix
1987	Jean de Florette		Claude Berri
1987	Mélo		Alain Resnais
1987	Ménage	Tenue de soirée	Bertrand Blier
1988	Goodbye, Children	Au revoir les enfants	Louis Malle
1988	The Grand Highway	Le Grand Chemin	Jean-Loup Hubert
1988	The Innocents	Les Innocents	André Téchiné
1988	Tandem		Patrice Leconte
1988	Under the Sun of Satan	Sous le soleil de Satan	Maurice Pialat
1989	Camille Claudel		Bruno Nuytten
1989	The Bear	L'Ours	Jean-Jacques Annaud
1989	The Big Blue	Le Grand Bleu	Luc Besson
1989	Life Is a Long Quiet River	La Vie est un long fleuve tranquille	Étienne Chatiliez
1989	The Reader	La Lectrice	Michel Deville

=== 1990s ===
Year	English title	Original title	Director
1990	Too Beautiful for You	Trop belle pour toi	Bertrand Blier
1990	Indian Nocturne	Nocturne indien	Alain Corneau
1990	Life and Nothing But	La Vie et rien d'autre	Bertrand Tavernier
1990	Mr. Hire	Monsieur Hire	Patrice Leconte
1990	Love Without Pity	Un monde sans pitié	Eric Rochant
1991	Cyrano de Bergerac		Jean-Paul Rappeneau
1991	The Hairdresser's Husband	Le Mari de la coiffeuse	Patrice Leconte
1991	The Little Gangster	Le Petit Criminel	Jacques Doillon
1991	La Femme Nikita	Nikita	Luc Besson
1991	Uranus		Claude Berri
1992	All the Mornings of the World	Tous les matins du monde	Alain Corneau
1992	Thank You Life	Merci la vie	Bertrand Blier
1992	The Beautiful Troublemaker	La Belle Noiseuse	Jacques Rivette
1992	Van Gogh		Maurice Pialat
1993	Savage Nights	Les nuits fauves	Cyril Collard
1993	And the Little Prince Said	Le Petit Prince a dit	Christine Pascal
1993	The Crisis	La Crise	Coline Serreau
1993	A Heart in Winter	Un cœur en hiver	Claude Sautet
1993	Indochine		Régis Wargnier
1993	L.627		Bertrand Tavernier
1994	Smoking/No Smoking		Alain Resnais
1994	Germinal		Claude Berri
1994	My Favorite Season	Ma saison préférée	André Téchiné
1994	Three Colors: Blue	Trois couleurs: Bleu	Krzysztof Kieślowski
1994	Les Visiteurs		Jean-Marie Poiré
1995	Wild Reeds	Les Roseaux sauvages	André Téchiné
1995	The Favourite Son	Le Fils préféré	Nicole Garcia
1995	Léon		Luc Besson
1995	Queen Margot	La Reine Margot	Patrice Chéreau
1995	Three Colors: Red	Trois couleurs: Rouge	Krzysztof Kieślowski
1996	Hate	La haine	Mathieu Kassovitz
1996	Happiness Is in the Field	Le Bonheur est dans le pré	Étienne Chatiliez
1996	The Ceremony	La Cérémonie	Claude Chabrol
1996	French Twist	Gazon maudit	Josiane Balasko
1996	The Horseman on the Roof	Le Hussard sur le toit	Jean-Paul Rappeneau
1996	Nelly and Mr. Arnaud	Nelly et Monsieur Arnaud	Claude Sautet
1997	Ridicule		Patrice Leconte
1997	Captain Conan	Capitaine Conan	Bertrand Tavernier
1997	Family Resemblances	Un air de famille	Cédric Klapisch
1997	Microcosmos	Microcosmos: Le peuple de l'herbe	Claude Nuridsany and Marie Pérennou
1997	Pédale douce		Gabriel Aghion
1997	Thieves	Les Voleurs	André Téchiné
1998	Same Old Song	On connaît la chanson	Alain Resnais
1998	The Fifth Element		Luc Besson
1998	Marius and Jeannette	Marius et Jeannette	Robert Guédiguian
1998	On Guard	Le Bossu	Philippe de Broca
1998	Western		Manuel Poirier
1999	The Dreamlife of Angels	La Vie rêvée des anges	Erick Zonca
1999	The Dinner Game	Le Dîner de cons	Francis Veber
1999	Place Vendôme		Nicole Garcia
1999	Taxi		Gérard Pirès
1999	Those Who Love Me Can Take the Train	Ceux qui m'aiment prendront le train	Patrice Chéreau

=== 2000s ===
Year	English title	Original title	Director
2000 (25th)	Venus Beauty Institute	Venus beauté (institut)	Tonie Marshall
2000 (25th)	The Children of the Marshland	Les Enfants du marais	Jean Becker
2000 (25th)	East/West	Est - Ouest	Régis Wargnier
2000 (25th)	Girl on the Bridge	La Fille sur le pont	Patrice Leconte
2000 (25th)	The Messenger: The Story of Joan of Arc	Jeanne d'Arc	Luc Besson
2001 (26th)	The Taste of Others	Le Goût des autres	Agnès Jaoui
2001 (26th)	Harry, He's Here to Help	Harry, un ami qui vous veut du bien	Dominik Moll
2001 (26th)	Murderous Maids	Les Blessures assassines	Jean-Pierre Denis
2001 (26th)	A Question of Taste	Une affaire de goût	Bernard Rapp
2001 (26th)	The King's Daughters	Saint-Cyr	Patricia Mazuy
2002 (27th)	Amélie	Le Fabuleux Destin d'Amélie Poulain	Jean-Pierre Jeunet
2002 (27th)	Chaos		Coline Serreau
2002 (27th)	The Officers' Ward	La Chambre des officiers	François Dupeyron
2002 (27th)	Read My Lips	Sur mes lèvres	Jacques Audiard
2002 (27th)	Under the Sand	Sous le sable	François Ozon
2003 (28th)	The Pianist		Roman Polanski
2003 (28th)	8 Women	8 femmes	François Ozon
2003 (28th)	Amen.		Costa-Gavras
2003 (28th)	The Spanish Apartment	L'Auberge espagnole	Cédric Klapisch
2003 (28th)	To Be and to Have	Être et avoir	Nicolas Philibert
2004 (29th)	The Barbarian Invasions	Les Invasions barbares	Denys Arcand
2004 (29th)	Bon voyage		Jean-Paul Rappeneau
2004 (29th)	Feelings	Les Sentiments	Noémie Lvovsky
2004 (29th)	Not on the Lips	Pas sur la bouche	Alain Resnais
2004 (29th)	The Triplets of Belleville	Les Triplettes de Belleville	Sylvain Chomet
2005 (30th)	Games of Love and Chance	L'Esquive	Abdellatif Kechiche
2005 (30th)	Department 36	36 Quai des Orfèvres	Olivier Marchal
2005 (30th)	The Chorus	Les Choristes	Christophe Barratier
2005 (30th)	Kings and Queen	Rois et reine	Arnaud Desplechin
2005 (30th)	A Very Long Engagement	Un long dimanche de fiançailles	Jean-Pierre Jeunet
2006 (31st)	The Beat That My Heart Skipped	De battre mon cœur s'est arrêté	Jacques Audiard
2006 (31st)	The Child	L'Enfant	Jean-Pierre and Luc Dardenne
2006 (31st)	Live and Become	Va, vis et deviens	Radu Mihaileanu
2006 (31st)	Merry Christmas	Joyeux Noël	Christian Carion
2006 (31st)	The Young Lieutenant	Le Petit Lieutenant	Xavier Beauvois
2007 (32nd)	Lady Chatterley		Pascale Ferran
2007 (32nd)	Days of Glory	Indigènes	Rachid Bouchareb
2007 (32nd)	I'm Fine, Don't Worry	Je vais bien, ne t'en fais pas	Philippe Lioret
2007 (32nd)	Tell No One	Ne le dis à personne	Guillaume Canet
2007 (32nd)	When I Was a Singer	Quand j'étais chanteur	Xavier Giannoli
2008 (33rd)	The Secret of the Grain	La Graine et le mulet	Abdellatif Kechiche
2008 (33rd)	The Diving Bell and the Butterfly	Le Scaphandre et le papillon	Julian Schnabel
2008 (33rd)	Persepolis		Vincent Paronnaud and Marjane Satrapi
2008 (33rd)	A Secret	Un secret	Claude Miller
2008 (33rd)	La Vie en Rose	La môme	Olivier Dahan
2009 (34th)	Séraphine		Martin Provost
2009 (34th)	A Christmas Tale	Un conte de Noël	Arnaud Desplechin
2009 (34th)	The Class	Entre les murs	Laurent Cantet
2009 (34th)	The First Day of the Rest of Your Life	Le Premier Jour du reste de ta vie	Rémi Bezançon
2009 (34th)	I've Loved You So Long	Il y a longtemps que je t'aime	Philippe Claudel
2009 (34th)	Paris		Cedric Klapisch
2009 (34th)	Public Enemy Number One: Part 1 and 2	L'Instinct de mort and L'Ennemi public n°1	Jean-François Richet

=== 2010s ===
Year	English title	Original title	Director
2010 (35th)	A Prophet	Un prophète	Jacques Audiard
2010 (35th)	In the Beginning	À l'origine	Xavier Giannoli
2010 (35th)	The Concert	Le Concert	Radu Mihaileanu
2010 (35th)	Wild Grass	Les Herbes folles	Alain Resnais
2010 (35th)	Skirt Day	La Journée de la jupe	Jean-Paul Lilienfeld
2010 (35th)	Rapt		Lucas Belvaux
2010 (35th)	Welcome		Philippe Lioret
2011 (36th)	Of Gods and Men	Des hommes et des dieux	Xavier Beauvois
2011 (36th)	Heartbreaker	L'Arnacœur	Pascal Chaumeil
2011 (36th)	Gainsbourg: A Heroic Life	Gainsbourg (Vie héroïque)	Joann Sfar
2011 (36th)	Mammuth		Benoît Delépine and Gustave de Kervern
2011 (36th)	The Names of Love	Le Nom des gens	Michel Leclerc
2011 (36th)	The Ghost Writer		Roman Polanski
2011 (36th)	On Tour	Tournée	Mathieu Amalric
2012 (37th)	The Artist		Michel Hazanavicius
2012 (37th)	The Minister	L'exercice de l'État	Pierre Schöller
2012 (37th)	Declaration of War	La Guerre est déclarée	Valérie Donzelli
2012 (37th)	Le Havre		Aki Kaurismäki
2012 (37th)	The Intouchables	Intouchables	Éric Toledano and Olivier Nakache
2012 (37th)	Pater		Alain Cavalier
2012 (37th)	Poliss	Polisse	Maïwenn
2013 (38th)	Amour		Michael Haneke
2013 (38th)	Camille Rewinds	Camille redouble	Noémie Lvovsky
2013 (38th)	Farewell, My Queen	Les Adieux à la reine	Benoît Jacquot
2013 (38th)	Holy Motors		Leos Carax
2013 (38th)	In the House	Dans la maison	François Ozon
2013 (38th)	Rust and Bone	De rouille et d'os	Jacques Audiard
2013 (38th)	What's in a Name?	Le prénom	Alexandre de La Patellière and Matthieu Delaporte
2014 (39th)	Me, Myself and Mum	Les Garçons et Guillaume, à table!	Guillaume Gallienne
2014 (39th)	9 Month Stretch	Neuf mois ferme	Albert Dupontel
2014 (39th)	Blue Is the Warmest Colour	La Vie d'Adèle – Chapitres 1 & 2	Abdellatif Kechiche
2014 (39th)	Jimmy P.		Arnaud Desplechin
2014 (39th)	The Past	Le Passé	Asghar Farhadi
2014 (39th)	Stranger by the Lake	L'Inconnu du lac	Alain Guiraudie
2014 (39th)	Venus in Fur	La Vénus à la fourrure	Roman Polanski
2015 (40th)	Timbuktu		Abderrahmane Sissako
2015 (40th)	Love at First Fight	Les Combattants	Thomas Cailley
2015 (40th)	Eastern Boys		Robin Campillo
2015 (40th)	The Bélier Family	La Famille Bélier	Éric Lartigau
2015 (40th)	Hippocrates	Hippocrate	Thomas Lilti
2015 (40th)	Saint Laurent		Bertrand Bonello
2015 (40th)	Clouds of Sils Maria	Sils Maria	Olivier Assayas
2016 (41st)	Fatima		Philippe Faucon
2016 (41st)	Dheepan		Jacques Audiard
2016 (41st)	The Measure of a Man	La Loi du marché	Stéphane Brizé
2016 (41st)	Marguerite		Xavier Giannoli
2016 (41st)	Mon roi		Maïwenn
2016 (41st)	Mustang		Deniz Gamze Ergüven
2016 (41st)	Standing Tall	La Tête haute	Emmanuelle Bercot
2016 (41st)	My Golden Days	Trois souvenirs de ma jeunesse	Arnaud Desplechin
2017 (42nd)	Elle		Paul Verhoeven
2017 (42nd)	Divines		Houda Benyamina
2017 (42nd)	Frantz		François Ozon
2017 (42nd)	The Innocents	Les Innocentes	Anne Fontaine
2017 (42nd)	Slack Bay	Ma Loute	Bruno Dumont
2017 (42nd)	From the Land of the Moon	Mal de pierres	Nicole Garcia
2017 (42nd)	In Bed with Victoria	Victoria	Justine Triet
2018 (43rd)	BPM (Beats per Minute)	120 battements par minute	Robin Campillo
2018 (43rd)	See You Up There	Au revoir là-haut	Albert Dupontel
2018 (43rd)	Barbara		Mathieu Amalric
2018 (43rd)	Le Brio		Yvan Attal
2018 (43rd)	Patients	Patients	Grand Corps Malade and Mehdi Idir
2018 (43rd)	Bloody Milk	Petit Paysan	Hubert Charuel
2018 (43rd)	C'est la vie!	Le Sens de la fête	Éric Toledano and Olivier Nakache
2019 (44th)	Custody	Jusqu'à la garde	Xavier Legrand
2019 (44th)	Sink or Swim	Le Grand Bain	Gilles Lellouche
2019 (44th)	The Sisters Brothers		Jacques Audiard
2019 (44th)	In Safe Hands	Pupille	Jeanne Herry
2019 (44th)	Guy		Alex Lutz
2019 (44th)	The Trouble with You	En liberté!	Pierre Salvadori
2019 (44th)	Memoir of War	La douleur	Emmanuel Finkiel

=== 2020s ===
Year	English title	Original title	Director
2020 (45th)	Les Misérables		Ladj Ly
2020 (45th)	La Belle Époque		Nicolas Bedos
2020 (45th)	By the Grace of God	Grâce à Dieu	François Ozon
2020 (45th)	The Specials	Hors normes	Éric Toledano and Olivier Nakache
2020 (45th)	An Officer and a Spy	J'accuse	Roman Polanski
2020 (45th)	Portrait of a Lady on Fire	Portrait de la jeune fille en feu	Céline Sciamma
2020 (45th)	Oh Mercy!	Roubaix, une lumière	Arnaud Desplechin
2021 (46th)	Bye Bye Morons	Adieu les cons	Albert Dupontel
2021 (46th)	Adolescents	Adolescentes	Sébastien Lifshitz
2021 (46th)	My Donkey, My Lover & I	Antoinette dans les Cévennes	Caroline Vignal
2021 (46th)	Love Affair(s)	Les Choses qu'on dit, les choses qu'on fait	Emmanuel Mouret
2021 (46th)	Summer of 85	Été 85	François Ozon
2022 (47th)	Lost Illusions	Illusions perdues	Xavier Giannoli
2022 (47th)	Aline		Valérie Lemercier
2022 (47th)	Annette		Leos Carax
2022 (47th)	The Divide	La fracture	Catherine Corsini
2022 (47th)	Happening	L'événement	Audrey Diwan
2022 (47th)	Onoda: 10,000 Nights in the Jungle	Onoda, 10 000 nuits dans la jungle	Arthur Harari
2022 (47th)	The Stronghold	BAC Nord	Cédric Jimenez
2023 (48th)	The Night of the 12th	La Nuit du 12	Dominik Moll
2023 (48th)	Forever Young	Les Amandiers	Valeria Bruni Tedeschi
2023 (48th)	Rise	En corps	Cédric Klapisch
2023 (48th)	The Innocent	L'Innocent	Louis Garrel
2023 (48th)	Pacifiction	Pacifiction – Tourment sur les îles	Albert Serra
2024 (49th)	Anatomy of a Fall	Anatomie d'une chute	Justine Triet
2024 (49th)	All Your Faces	Je verrai toujours vos visages	Jeanne Herry
2024 (49th)	The Animal Kingdom	Le Règne animal	Thomas Cailley
2024 (49th)	The Goldman Case	Le Procès Goldman	Cédric Kahn
2024 (49th)	Junkyard Dog	Chien de la casse	Jean-Baptiste Durand
2025 (50th)	Emilia Pérez		Jacques Audiard
2025 (50th)	The Count of Monte Cristo	Le Comte de Monte-Cristo	Matthieu Delaporte and Alexandre de La Patellière
2025 (50th)	The Marching Band	En Fanfare	Emmanuel Courcol
2025 (50th)	Misericordia	Miséricorde	Alain Guiraudie
2025 (50th)	Souleymane's Story	L'Histoire de Souleymane	Boris Lojkine
2026 (51st)	The Ties That Bind Us	L'Attachement	Carine Tardieu
2026 (51st)	Case 137	Dossier 137	Dominik Moll
2026 (51st)	It Was Just an Accident	یک تصادف ساده	Jafar Panahi
2026 (51st)	The Little Sister	La Petite Dernière	Hafsia Herzi
2026 (51st)	Nouvelle Vague		Richard Linklater

== See also ==
- Lumière Award for Best Film
- Louis Delluc Prize for Best Film
- French Syndicate of Cinema Critics — Best French Film
- Magritte Award for Best Film
- European Film Award for Best Film
- Academy Award for Best Picture
- BAFTA Award for Best Film
- David di Donatello for Best Film
- Goya Award for Best Film
- Sophia Award for Best Film
