= César Award for Best Original Screenplay or Adaptation =

French arts award

The César Award for Best Original Screenplay or Adaptation (French: César du meilleur scénario, dialogue ou adaptation (1976–1982); César du meilleur scénario original ou adaptation (1986–2005)) is a discontinued award given by the Académie des Arts et Techniques du Cinéma from 1976 to 2005. It was split into César Award for Best Original Screenplay and César Award for Best Adaptation in 2006.

== Winners and nominees ==
=== 1970s ===
Year	Winners and nominees	Original title	Writer(s)
1976 (1st)	Let Joy Reign Supreme	Que la fête commence	Bertrand Tavernier and Jean Aurenche
1976 (1st)	7 morts sur ordonnance		Georges Conchon and Jacques Rouffio
1976 (1st)	Le Vieux Fusil		Robert Enrico and Pascal Jardin
1976 (1st)	Cousin, cousine		Jean-Charles Tacchella
1977 (2nd)	The Judge and the Assassin	Le Juge et l'Assassin	Jean Aurenche and Bertrand Tavernier
1977 (2nd)	The Best Way to Walk	La Meilleure Façon de marcher	Luc Béraud and Claude Miller
1977 (2nd)	Pardon Mon Affaire	Un éléphant ça trompe énormément	Jean-Loup Dabadie
1977 (2nd)	The Toy	Le Jouet	Francis Veber
1978 (3rd)	Providence		David Mercer
1978 (3rd)	Death of a Corrupt Man	Mort d'un pourri	Michel Audiard
1978 (3rd)	That Obscure Object of Desire	Cet obscur objet du désir	Luis Buñuel and Jean-Claude Carrière
1978 (3rd)	Pardon Mon Affaire, Too!	Nous irons tous au paradis	Jean-Loup Dabadie
1979 (4th)	Dossier 51	Le Dossier 51	Gilles Perrault and Michel Deville
1979 (4th)	L'Argent des autres		Christian de Chalonge and Pierre Dumayet
1979 (4th)	Le sucre		Georges Conchon and Jacques Rouffio
1979 (4th)	A Simple Story	Une histoire simple	Jean-Loup Dabadie and Claude Sautet

=== 1980s ===
Year	Winners and nominees	Original title	Writer(s)
1980 (5th)	Buffet froid		Bertrand Blier
1980 (5th)	The Hussy	La Drôlesse	Jacques Doillon
1980 (5th)	I as in Icarus	I... comme Icare	Didier Decoin and Henri Verneuil
1980 (5th)	Série noire		Alain Corneau and Georges Perec
1981 (6th)	The Last Metro	Le Dernier Métro	François Truffaut and Suzanne Schiffman
1981 (6th)	My American Uncle	Mon oncle d'Amérique	Jean Gruault
1981 (6th)	Atlantic City		John Guare
1981 (6th)	Death Watch	La Mort en direct	David Rayfiel and Bertrand Tavernier
1982 (7th)	Garde à vue		Jean Herman, Michel Audiard and Claude Miller
1982 (7th)	Coup de Torchon		Jean Aurenche and Bertrand Tavernier
1982 (7th)	Quest for Fire	La Guerre du feu	Gérard Brach
1982 (7th)	Strange Affair	Une étrange affaire	Christopher Frank, Pierre Granier-Deferre and Jean-Marc Roberts

The César Award for Best Adaptation and the César Award for Best Original Screenplay were awarded from 1983 to 1985.

Year	Winners and nominees	Original title	Writer(s)
1986 (11th)	Three Men and a Cradle	Trois hommes et un couffin	Coline Serreau
1986 (11th)	Rendez-vous		Jean Gruault
1986 (11th)	He Died with His Eyes Open	On ne meurt que deux fois	Michel Audiard and Jacques Deray
1986 (11th)	An Impudent Girl	L'Effrontée	Luc Béraud, Claude Miller, Annie Miller and Bernard Stora
1986 (11th)	Death in a French Garden	Péril en la demeure	Michel Deville
1987 (12th)	Thérèse		Camille de Casabianca and Alain Cavalier
1987 (12th)	Jean de Florette		Claude Berri and Gérard Brach
1987 (12th)	Ménage	Tenue de soirée	Bertrand Blier
1987 (12th)	The Fugitives	Les Fugitifs	Francis Veber
1988 (13th)	Au revoir les enfants		Louis Malle
1988 (13th)	Tandem		Patrick Dewolf and Patrice Leconte
1988 (13th)	The Grand Highway	Le Grand Chemin	Jean-Loup Hubert
1988 (13th)	Boyfriends and Girlfriends	L'Ami de mon amie	Éric Rohmer
1988 (13th)	Beatrice	La Passion Béatrice	Colo Tavernier O'Hagan
1989 (14th)	Life Is a Long Quiet River	La vie est un long fleuve tranquille	Étienne Chatiliez and Florence Quentin
1989 (14th)	The Little Thief	La Petite Voleuse	Luc Béraud, François Truffaut, Claude de Givray and Annie Miller
1989 (14th)	The Reader	La Lectrice	Michel Deville and Rosalinde Deville
1989 (14th)	A Strange Place to Meet	Drôle d'endroit pour une rencontre	François Dupeyron and Dominique Faysse

=== 1990s ===
Year	Winners and nominees	Original title	Writer(s)
1990 (15th)	Too Beautiful for You	Trop belle pour toi	Bertrand Blier
1990 (15th)	Life and Nothing But	La Vie et rien d'autre	Jean Cosmos and Bertrand Tavernier
1990 (15th)	Force majeure		Pierre Jolivet and Olivier Schatzky
1990 (15th)	Love Without Pity	Un monde sans pitié	Éric Rochant
1991 (16th)	La Discrète		Jean-Pierre Ronssin and Christian Vincent
1991 (16th)	Cyrano de Bergerac		Jean-Claude Carrière and Jean-Paul Rappeneau
1991 (16th)	The Little Gangster	Le Petit Criminel	Jacques Doillon
1991 (16th)	The Hairdresser's Husband	Le Mari de la coiffeuse	Claude Klotz and Patrice Leconte
1992 (17th)	Delicatessen		Jean-Pierre Jeunet, Marc Caro and Gilles Adrien
1992 (17th)	Merci la vie		Bertrand Blier
1992 (17th)	Tous les matins du monde		Alain Corneau and Pascal Quignard
1992 (17th)	Van Gogh		Maurice Pialat
1993 (18th)	La Crise		Coline Serreau
1993 (18th)	L.627		Michel Alexandre and Bertrand Tavernier
1993 (18th)	Savage Nights	Les Nuits fauves	Cyril Collard
1993 (18th)	The Sentinel	La Sentinelle	Arnaud Desplechin
1993 (18th)	A Heart in Winter	Un cœur en hiver	Jacques Fieschi and Claude Sautet
1994 (19th)	Smoking / No Smoking		Agnès Jaoui and Jean-Pierre Bacri
1994 (19th)	Germinal		Claude Berri and Arlette Langmann-Ramonet
1994 (19th)	My Favorite Season	Ma saison préférée	Pascal Bonitzer and André Téchiné
1994 (19th)	Les Visiteurs		Christian Clavier and Jean-Marie Poiré
1994 (19th)	Three Colors: Blue	Trois Couleurs : Bleu	Krzysztof Kieślowski and Krzysztof Piesiewicz
1995 (20th)	Wild Reeds	Les Roseaux sauvages	André Téchiné, Olivier Massart and Gilles Taurand
1995 (20th)	See How They Fall	Regarde les hommes tomber	Jacques Audiard and Alain Le Henry
1995 (20th)	Grosse Fatigue		Michel Blanc
1995 (20th)	La Reine Margot		Patrice Chéreau and Danièle Thompson
1995 (20th)	Three Colors: Red	Trois Couleurs : Rouge	Krzysztof Kieślowski and Krzysztof Piesiewicz
1996 (21st)	French Twist	Gazon maudit	Telsche Boorman and Josiane Balasko
1996 (21st)	La Cérémonie		Claude Chabrol and Caroline Eliacheff
1996 (21st)	Nelly and Mr. Arnaud	Nelly et Monsieur Arnaud	Jacques Fieschi and Claude Sautet
1996 (21st)	La Haine		Mathieu Kassovitz
1996 (21st)	Happiness Is in the Field	Le Bonheur est dans le pré	Florence Quentin
1997 (22nd)	Family Resemblances	Un air de famille	Cédric Klapisch, Agnès Jaoui and Jean-Pierre Bacri
1997 (22nd)	Pédale douce		Gabriel Aghion and Patrick Timsit
1997 (22nd)	A Self Made Hero	Un héros très discret	Jacques Audiard and Alain Le Henry
1997 (22nd)	Capitaine Conan		Jean Cosmos and Bertrand Tavernier
1997 (22nd)	Ridicule		Rémi Waterhouse
1998 (23rd)	Same Old Song	On connaît la chanson	Agnès Jaoui and Jean-Pierre Bacri
1998 (23rd)	Le Cousin		Michel Alexandre and Alain Corneau
1998 (23rd)	Dry Cleaning	Nettoyage à sec	Anne Fontaine and Gilles Taurand
1998 (23rd)	Western		Jean-François Goyet and Manuel Poirier
1998 (23rd)	Marius and Jeannette	Marius et Jeannette	Robert Guédiguian and Jean-Louis Milesi
1999 (24th)	Le Dîner de cons		Francis Veber
1999 (24th)	The Dreamlife of Angels	La Vie rêvée des anges	Roger Bohbot and Erick Zonca
1999 (24th)	Those Who Love Me Can Take the Train	Ceux qui m'aiment prendront le train	Patrice Chéreau, Danièle Thompson and Pierre Trividic
1999 (24th)	Place Vendôme		Jacques Fieschi and Nicole Garcia
1999 (24th)	Train of Life	Train de vie	Robert Guédiguian and Radu Mihăileanu

=== 2000s ===
Year	Winners and nominees	Original title	Writer(s)
2000 (25th)	Venus Beauty Institute	Vénus Beauté (Institut)	Tonie Marshall
2000 (25th)	Sachs' Disease	La Maladie de Sachs	Michel Deville and Rosalinde Deville
2000 (25th)	Girl on the Bridge	La Fille sur le pont	Serge Frydman
2000 (25th)	My Little Business	Ma petite entreprise	Pierre Jolivet and Simon Michaël
2000 (25th)	Season's Beatings	La Bûche	Christopher Thompson and Danièle Thompson
2001 (26th)	The Taste of Others	Le Goût des autres	Jean-Pierre Bacri and Agnès Jaoui
2001 (26th)	Harry, He's Here to Help	Harry, un ami qui vous veut du bien	Gilles Marchand and Dominik Moll
2001 (26th)	Human Resources	Ressources humaines	Laurent Cantet and Gilles Marchand
2001 (26th)	A Question of Taste	Une affaire de goût	Bernard Rapp and Gilles Taurand
2001 (26th)	Saint-Cyr		Patricia Mazuy and Yves Thomas
2002 (27th)	Read My Lips	Sur mes lèvres	Jacques Audiard and Tonio Benacquista
2002 (27th)	Amélie (nominated for the Academy Award)	Le Fabuleux destin d'Amélie Poulain	Jean-Pierre Jeunet and Guillaume Laurant
2002 (27th)	Chaos		Coline Serreau
2002 (27th)	No Man's Land		Danis Tanović
2002 (27th)	The Officers' Ward	La Chambre des officiers	François Dupeyron
2003 (28th)	Amen.		Costa-Gavras
2003 (28th)	8 Women	8 femmes	François Ozon and Marina de Van
2003 (28th)	The Pianist		Ronald Harwood
2003 (28th)	The Spanish Apartment	L'Auberge espagnole	Cédric Klapisch
2003 (28th)	Summer Things	Embrassez qui vous voudrez	Michel Blanc
2004 (29th)	The Barbarian Invasions (nominated for the Academy Award)	Les Invasions barbares	Denys Arcand
2004 (29th)	Bon voyage		Patrick Modiano and Jean-Paul Rappeneau
2004 (29th)	Fear and Trembling	Stupeur et tremblements	Alain Corneau
2004 (29th)	One: On the Run; Two: An Amazing Couple; Three: After Life	Cavale; Un couple épatant Après la vie	Lucas Belvaux
2004 (29th)	Since Otar Left	Depuis qu'Otar est parti...	Julie Bertucelli, Roger Bohbot and Bernard Renucci
2005 (30th)	Games of Love and Chance	L'Esquive	Abdellatif Kechiche and Ghalia Lacroix
2005 (30th)	Department 36	36 Quai des Orfèvres	Franck Mancuso, Olivier Marchal and Julien Rappeneau
2005 (30th)	Kings and Queen	Rois et reine	Roger Bohbot and Arnaud Desplechin
2005 (30th)	Look at Me	Comme une image	Jean-Pierre Bacri and Agnès Jaoui
2005 (30th)	A Very Long Engagement	Un long dimanche de fiançailles	Jean-Pierre Jeunet and Guillaume Laurant

== See also ==
- César Award for Best Adaptation
- César Award for Best Original Screenplay
- Academy Award for Best Adapted Screenplay
- Academy Award for Best Original Screenplay
- BAFTA Award for Best Adapted Screenplay
- BAFTA Award for Best Original Screenplay
