= César Award for Best Actor =

Honor awarded to French actors

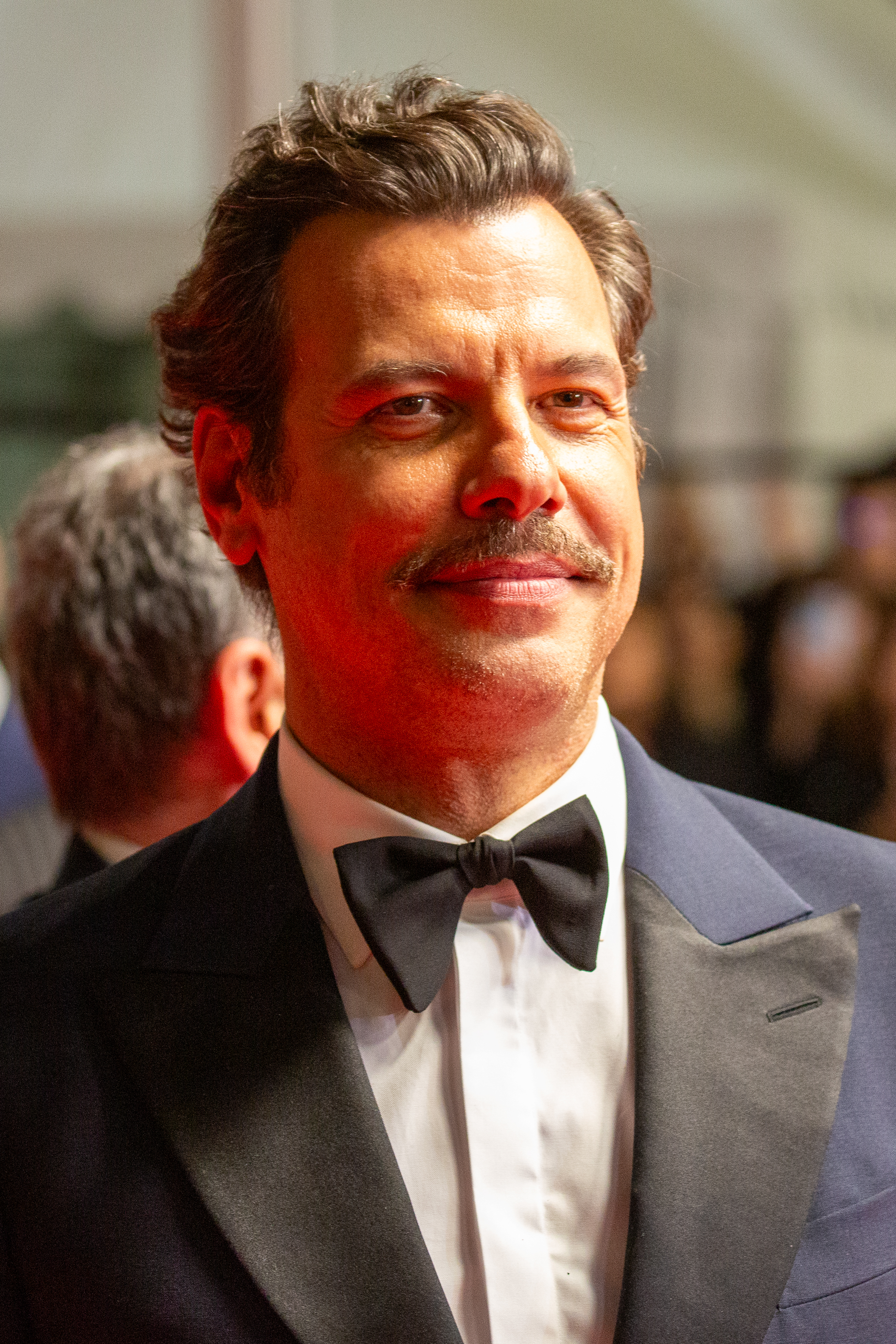
- 2026 recipient: Laurent Lafitte
- Awarded for: Best Actor in a Leading Role
- Country: France
- Presented by: Académie des Arts et Techniques du Cinéma
- First award: 1976
- Currently held by: Laurent Lafitte for The Richest Woman in the World (2026)
- Website: academie-cinema.org

The César Award for Best Actor (French: César de la meilleure acteur) is one of the César Awards, presented annually by the Académie des Arts et Techniques du Cinéma to recognize the outstanding performance in a leading role of an actor who has worked within the French film industry during the year preceding the ceremony. Nominees and winner are selected via a run-off voting by all the members of the Académie.

== Winners and nominees ==
Following the Académie des Arts et Techniques du Cinéma (AATC)'s practice, the films below are listed by year of ceremony, which corresponds to the year following the film's year of release. For example, the César for Best Actor of 2010 was awarded on February 27, 2010 for a performance in a film released between January 1, 2009 and December 31, 2009.

Actors are selected via a two-round vote: first round to choose the nominees, second round to designate the winner. All the members of the Académie, without regard to their branch, are eligible to vote on both rounds. The number of nominees, initially set to four, was expanded to five in 1984 and then to seven in 2012.

Winners are listed first in bold, followed by the other nominees in alphabetic order.

== Winners ==
=== 1970s ===
Year	Winner	English title	Original title	Role/Character
1976 (1st)	**Philippe Noiret**	**The Old Gun**	**Le Vieux Fusil**	**Julien Dandieu**
1976 (1st)	Victor Lanoux	Cousin, Cousin	Cousin, cousine	Ludovic
1976 (1st)	Jean-Pierre Marielle	Cookies	Les Galettes de Pont-Aven	Henri Serin
1976 (1st)	Gérard Depardieu	7 morts sur ordonnance	7 morts sur ordonnance	Doctor Jean-Pierre Berg
1977 (2nd)	**Michel Galabru**	**The Judge and the Assassin**	**Le Juge et l'assassin**	**Sgt. Joseph Bouvier**
1977 (2nd)	Alain Delon	Mr. Klein	Monsieur Klein	Mr. Klein
1977 (2nd)	Gérard Depardieu	The Last Woman	La Dernière Femme	Gérard
1977 (2nd)	Patrick Dewaere	The Best Way to Walk	La Meilleure Façon de marcher	Marc
1978 (3rd)	**Jean Rochefort**	**Drummer-Crab**	**Le Crabe-tambour**	**Captain**
1978 (3rd)	Alain Delon	Death of a Corrupt Man	Mort d'un pourri	Xavier 'Xav' Maréchal
1978 (3rd)	Gérard Depardieu	This Sweet Sickness	Dites-lui que je l'aime	David Martinaud
1978 (3rd)	Patrick Dewaere	Judge Fayard Called the Sheriff	Le Juge Fayard dit le Shériff	Judge Fayard
1978 (3rd)	Charles Denner	The Man Who Loved Women	L'Homme qui aimait les femmes	Bertrand Morane
1979 (4th)	**Michel Serrault**	**Birds of a Feather**	**La Cage aux folles**	**Albin Mougeotte/Zaza Napoli**
1979 (4th)	Claude Brasseur	A Simple Story	Une histoire simple	Serge
1979 (4th)	Jean Carmet	The Sugar	Le Sucre	Adrien Courtois
1979 (4th)	Gérard Depardieu	The Sugar	Le Sucre	Raoul-Renaud Homecourt

=== 1980s ===
Year	Winner	English title	Original title	Role/Character
1980 (5th)	**Claude Brasseur**	**The Police War**	**La Guerre des polices**	**Jacques Fush**
1980 (5th)	Patrick Dewaere	Série noire		Franck Poupart
1980 (5th)	Yves Montand	I as in Icarus	I... comme Icare	Henri Volney
1980 (5th)	Jean Rochefort	Courage - Let's Run	Courage fuyons	Martin Belhomme / Adrien Belhomme
1981 (6th)	**Gérard Depardieu**	**The Last Metro**	**Le Dernier Métro**	**Bernard Granger**
1981 (6th)	Michel Serrault	La Cage aux Folles II		Albin Mougeotte/Zaza Napoli
1981 (6th)	Philippe Noiret	Heads or Tails	Pile ou face	Detective Louis Baroni
1981 (6th)	Patrick Dewaere	A Bad Son	Un mauvais fils	Bruno Calgagni
1982 (7th)	**Michel Serrault**	**Under Suspicion**	**Garde à vue**	**Jérôme Martinaud**
1982 (7th)	Patrick Dewaere	Stepfather	Beau-père	Rémi
1982 (7th)	Philippe Noiret	Clean Slate	Coup de torchon	Lucien Cordier
1982 (7th)	Michel Piccoli	Strange Affair	Une étrange affaire	Bertrand Malair
1983 (8th)	**Philippe Léotard**	**The Nark**	**La Balance**	**Dédé Laffont**
1983 (8th)	Gérard Depardieu	Danton		Georges Danton
1983 (8th)	Gérard Lanvin	Tir groupé		Antoine Béranger
1983 (8th)	Lino Ventura	Les Misérables		Jean Valjean
1984 (9th)	**Michel "Coluche" Colucci**	**So Long, Stooge**	**Tchao pantin**	**Lambert**
1984 (9th)	Gérard Depardieu	ComDads	Les Compères	Jean Lucas
1984 (9th)	Yves Montand	Waiter!	Garçon!	Alex
1984 (9th)	Michel Serrault	Deadly Run	Mortelle randonnée	Beauvoir
1984 (9th)	Alain Souchon	One Deadly Summer	L'Été meurtrier	Fiorimonto "Florimond" Montecciari
1985 (10th)	**Alain Delon**	**Our Story**	**Notre histoire**	**Robert Avranches**
1985 (10th)	Gérard Depardieu	Fort Saganne		Charles Saganne
1985 (10th)	Louis Ducreux	A Sunday in the Country	Un dimanche à la campagne	Mr. Ladmiral
1985 (10th)	Philippe Noiret	My New Partner	Les Ripoux	René Boirond
1985 (10th)	Michel Piccoli	Dangerous Moves	La Diagonale du fou	Akiva Liebskind
1986 (11th)	**Christopher Lambert**	**Subway**		**Fred**
1986 (11th)	Gérard Depardieu	Police		Louis Vincent Mangin
1986 (11th)	Robin Renucci	Staircase C	Escalier C	Forster
1986 (11th)	Michel Serrault	He Died with His Eyes Open	On ne meurt que 2 fois	Inspector Robert Staniland
1986 (11th)	Lambert Wilson	Rendez-vous		Quentin
1987 (12th)	**Daniel Auteuil**	**Jean de Florette**		**Ugolin**
1987 (12th)	**Daniel Auteuil**	**Jean de Florette II: Manon of the Spring**	**Manon des sources**	**Ugolin**
1987 (12th)	Jean-Hugues Anglade	Betty Blue	37°2 le matin	Zorg
1987 (12th)	Michel Blanc	Ménage	Tenue de soirée	Antoine
1987 (12th)	André Dussollier	Mélo		Marcel Blanc
1987 (12th)	Christophe Malavoy	The Woman of My Life	La Femme de ma vie	Simon
1988 (13th)	**Richard Bohringer**	**The Grand Highway**	**Le Grand Chemin**	**Pelo**
1988 (13th)	Jean Carmet	Miss Mona		Miss Mona
1988 (13th)	Gérard Depardieu	Under the Sun of Satan	Sous le soleil de Satan	Abbé Donissan
1988 (13th)	Gérard Jugnot	Tandem		Rivetot
1988 (13th)	Christophe Malavoy	Engagements of the Heart	De guerre lasse	Charles Sambrat
1988 (13th)	Jean Rochefort	Tandem		Michel Mortez
1989 (14th)	**Jean-Paul Belmondo**	**Itinerary of a Spoiled Child**	**Itinéraire d'un enfant gâté**	**Sam Lion**
1989 (14th)	Richard Anconina	Itinerary of a Spoiled Child	Itinéraire d'un enfant gâté	Albert Duvivier
1989 (14th)	Daniel Auteuil	A Few Days with Me	Quelques jours avec moi	Martial Pasquier
1989 (14th)	Jean-Marc Barr	The Big Blue	Le Grand Bleu	Jacques Mayol
1989 (14th)	Gérard Depardieu	Camille Claudel		Auguste Rodin

=== 1990s ===
Year	Winner	English title	Original title	Role/Character
1990 (15th)	**Philippe Noiret**	**Life and Nothing But**	**La Vie et rien d'autre**	**Commandant Delaplane**
1990 (15th)	Jean-Hugues Anglade	Indian Nocturne	Nocturne indien	Rossignol
1990 (15th)	Michel Blanc	Mr. Hire	Monsieur Hire	Mr. Hire
1990 (15th)	Gérard Depardieu	Too Beautiful for You	Trop belle pour toi	Bernard Barthélémy
1990 (15th)	Hippolyte Girardot	Love Without Pity	Un monde sans pitié	Hippo
1990 (15th)	Lambert Wilson	Hiver 54, l'abbé Pierre		Abbé Pierre
1991 (16th)	**Gérard Depardieu** **(nominated for the Academy Award)**	**Cyrano de Bergerac**		**Cyrano de Bergerac**
1991 (16th)	Daniel Auteuil	Lacenaire		Pierre-François Lacenaire
1991 (16th)	Fabrice Luchini	The Discreet	La Discrète	Antoine
1991 (16th)	Michel Piccoli	Milou in May	Milou en Mai	Milou
1991 (16th)	Jean Rochefort	The Hairdresser's Husband	Le Mari de la coiffeuse	Antoine
1991 (16th)	Michel Serrault	Dr. Petiot	Docteur Petiot	Dr. Petiot
1992 (17th)	**Jacques Dutronc**	**Van Gogh**		**Vincent Van Gogh**
1992 (17th)	Michel Piccoli	The Beautiful Troublemaker	La Belle Noiseuse	Édouard Frenhofer
1992 (17th)	Hippolyte Girardot	Out of Life	Hors la vie	Patrick Perrault
1992 (17th)	Jean-Pierre Marielle	All the Mornings of the World	Tous les matins du monde	Monsieur de Sainte-Colombe
1992 (17th)	Gérard Jugnot	Une époque formidable...		Michel Berthier
1993 (18th)	**Claude Rich**	**The Supper**	**Le Souper**	**Charles-Maurice de Talleyrand-Périgord**
1993 (18th)	Daniel Auteuil	A Heart in Winter	Un cœur en hiver	Stéphane
1993 (18th)	Claude Brasseur	The Supper	Le Souper	Joseph Fouché
1993 (18th)	Richard Berry	And the Little Prince Said	Le Petit Prince a dit	Adam Leibovich
1993 (18th)	Vincent Lindon	The Crisis	La Crise	Victor
1994 (19th)	**Pierre Arditi**	**Smoking/No Smoking**		**Toby Teasdale / Miles Coombes / Lionel Hepplewick / Joe Hepplewick**
1994 (19th)	Daniel Auteuil	My Favorite Season	Ma saison préférée	Antoine
1994 (19th)	Michel Boujenah	Le Nombril du monde		Bajou
1994 (19th)	Christian Clavier	The Visitors	Les Visiteurs	Jacquouille
1994 (19th)	Jean Reno	The Visitors	Les Visiteurs	Godefroy de Montmirail
1995 (20th)	**Gérard Lanvin**	**The Favourite Son**	**Le Fils préféré**	**Jean-Paul Mantegna**
1995 (20th)	Daniel Auteuil	The Separation	La Séparation	Pierre
1995 (20th)	Gérard Depardieu	Colonel Chabert	Le Colonel Chabert	Amédé Chabert
1995 (20th)	Jean Reno	Léon		Léon
1995 (20th)	Jean-Louis Trintignant	Three Colors: Red	Trois couleurs: Rouge	Joseph Kern
1996 (21st)	**Michel Serrault**	**Nelly and Mr. Arnaud**	**Nelly et Monsieur Arnaud**	**Pierre Arnaud**
1996 (21st)	Vincent Cassel	Hate	La Haine	Vinz
1996 (21st)	Alain Chabat	French Twist	Gazon maudit	Laurent
1996 (21st)	François Cluzet	The Apprentices	Les Apprentis	Antoine
1996 (21st)	Jean-Louis Trintignant	Fiesta		Colonel Masagual
1997 (22nd)	**Philippe Torreton**	**Captain Conan**	**Capitaine Conan**	**Captain Conan**
1997 (22nd)	Daniel Auteuil	The Eighth Day	Le Huitième Jour	Harry
1997 (22nd)	Charles Berling	Ridicule		Baron Grégoire Ponceludon de Malavoy
1997 (22nd)	Fabrice Luchini	Beaumarchais the Scoundrel	Beaumarchais, l'insolent	Pierre Beaumarchais
1997 (22nd)	Patrick Timsit	Pédale douce		Adrien Aymar
1998 (23rd)	**André Dussolier**	**Same Old Song**	**On connaît la chanson**	**Simon**
1998 (23rd)	Daniel Auteuil	On Guard	Le Bossu	Lagardère
1998 (23rd)	Charles Berling	Dry Cleaning	Nettoyage à sec	Jean-Marie Kunstler
1998 (23rd)	Alain Chabat	Didier		Didier Hazanavicus
1998 (23rd)	Patrick Timsit	Le Cousin		Nounours
1999 (24th)	**Jacques Villeret**	**The Dinner Game**	**Le Dîner de cons**	**François Pignon**
1999 (24th)	Charles Berling	L'Ennui		Martin
1999 (24th)	Antoine de Caunes	Man Is a Woman	L'Homme est une femme comme les autres	Simon Eskanazy
1999 (24th)	Jean-Pierre Darroussin	Le Poulpe		Gabriel Lecouvreur
1999 (24th)	Pascal Greggory	Those Who Love Me Can Take the Train	Ceux qui m'aiment prendront le train	François

=== 2000s ===
Year	Winner	English title	Original title	Role/Character
2000 (25th)	**Daniel Auteuil**	**Girl on the Bridge**	**La Fille sur le pont**	**Gabor**
2000 (25th)	Jean-Pierre Bacri	Kennedy and I	Kennedy et moi	Simon Polaris
2000 (25th)	Albert Dupontel	Sachs' Disease	La Maladie de Sachs	Doctor Bruno Sachs
2000 (25th)	Vincent Lindon	My Little Business	Ma petite entreprise	Ivan Lansi
2000 (25th)	Philippe Torreton	It All Starts Today	Ça commence aujourd'hui	Daniel Lefebvre
2001 (26th)	**Sergi López**	**Harry, He's Here to Help**	**Harry, un ami qui vous veut du bien**	**Harry**
2001 (26th)	Jean-Pierre Bacri	The Taste of Others	Le Goût des autres	Jean-Jacques Castella
2001 (26th)	Charles Berling	Sentimental Destinies	Les Destinées sentimentales	Jean Barnery
2001 (26th)	Bernard Giraudeau	A Question of Taste	Une affaire de goût	Frédéric Delamont
2001 (26th)	Pascal Greggory	Confusion of Genders	La Confusion des genres	Alain Bauman
2002 (27th)	**Michel Bouquet**	**How I Killed My Father**	**Comment j'ai tué mon père**	**Maurice**
2002 (27th)	Eric Caravaca	The Officers' Ward	La Chambre des officiers	Adrien
2002 (27th)	Vincent Cassel	Read My Lips	Sur mes lèvres	Paul Angeli
2002 (27th)	André Dussollier	Tanguy		Paul Guetz
2002 (27th)	Jacques Dutronc	That's Life	C'est la vie	Dimitri
2003 (28th)	**Adrien Brody** **(won the Academy Award)**	**The Pianist**		**Władysław Szpilman**
2003 (28th)	Daniel Auteuil	The Adversary	L'Adversaire	Jean-Marc Faure
2003 (28th)	François Berléand	Whatever You Say	Mon idole	Jean-Louis Broustal
2003 (28th)	Bernard Campan	Beautiful Memories	Se souvenir des belles choses	Philippe
2003 (28th)	Mathieu Kassovitz	Amen.		Riccardo Fontana
2004 (29th)	**Omar Sharif**	**Monsieur Ibrahim**	**Monsieur Ibrahim et les fleurs du Coran**	**Mr. Ibrahim**
2004 (29th)	Daniel Auteuil	After You...	Après vous...	Antoine Letoux
2004 (29th)	Jean-Pierre Bacri	Feelings	Les Sentiments	Jacques
2004 (29th)	Gad Elmaleh	Chouchou		Chouchou
2004 (29th)	Bruno Todeschini	His Brother	Son frère	Thomas
2005 (30th)	**Mathieu Amalric**	**Kings and Queen**	**Rois et reine**	**Ismaël Vuillard**
2005 (30th)	Daniel Auteuil	Department 36	36 Quai des Orfèvres	Léo Vrinks
2005 (30th)	Gérard Jugnot	The Chorus	Les Choristes	Clement Mathieu
2005 (30th)	Benoît Poelvoorde	Podium		Bernard Frédéric
2005 (30th)	Philippe Torreton	The Light	L'Équipier	Yvon Le Guen
2006 (31st)	**Michel Bouquet**	**The Last Mitterrand**	**Le Promeneur du Champ-de-Mars**	**The President**
2006 (31st)	Patrick Chesnais	Not Here to Be Loved	Je ne suis pas là pour être aimé	Jean-Claude Delsart
2006 (31st)	Romain Duris	The Beat That My Heart Skipped	De battre mon cœur s'est arrêté	Thomas Seyr
2006 (31st)	José Garcia	The Axe	Le Couperet	Bruno Davert
2006 (31st)	Benoît Poelvoorde	In His Hands	Entre ses mains	Laurent Kessler
2007 (32nd)	**François Cluzet**	**Tell No One**	**Ne le dis à personne**	**Alexandre Beck**
2007 (32nd)	Michel Blanc	You Are So Beautiful	Je vous trouve très beau	Aymé Pigrenet
2007 (32nd)	Alain Chabat	Rent a Wife	Prête-moi ta main	Luis
2007 (32nd)	Gérard Depardieu	When I Was a Singer (a.k.a. The Singer)	Quand j'étais chanteur	Alain Moreau
2007 (32nd)	Jean Dujardin	OSS 117: Cairo, Nest of Spies	OSS 117: Le Caire nid d'espions	Hubert Bonisseur de la Bath/OSS 117
2008 (33rd)	**Mathieu Amalric**	**The Diving Bell and the Butterfly**	**Le Scaphandre et le papillon**	**Jean-Dominique Bauby**
2008 (33rd)	Michel Blanc	The Witnesses	Les Témoins	Adrien
2008 (33rd)	Jean-Pierre Darroussin	Conversations with My Gardener	Dialogue avec mon jardinier	Dujardin
2008 (33rd)	Vincent Lindon	Those Who Remain	Ceux qui restent	Bertrand Liévain
2008 (33rd)	Jean-Pierre Marielle	Let's Dance	Faut que ça danse!	Salomon Bellinsky
2009 (34th)	**Vincent Cassel**	**Mesrine I: Killer Instinct**	**L'Instinct de mort**	**Jacques Mesrine**
2009 (34th)	**Vincent Cassel**	**Mesrine II: Public Enemy No. 1**	**L'Ennemi public n°1**	**Jacques Mesrine**
2009 (34th)	François-Xavier Demaison	Coluche, l'histoire d'un mec		Coluche
2009 (34th)	Guillaume Depardieu	Versailles		Damien
2009 (34th)	Albert Dupontel	Love Me No More	Deux jours à tuer	Antoine Méliot
2009 (34th)	Jacques Gamblin	The First Day of the Rest of Your Life	Le Premier Jour du reste de ta vie	Robert Duval

=== 2010s ===
Year	Winner	English title	Original title	Role/Character
2010 (35th)	**Tahar Rahim**	**A Prophet**	**Un prophète**	**Malik El-Djebena**
2010 (35th)	Yvan Attal	Rapt		Stanislas Graff
2010 (35th)	Francois Cluzet	In the Beginning	À l'origine	Paul / Philippe Miller
2010 (35th)	Francois Cluzet	The End of the Road	Le Dernier pour la route	Hervé Chabalier
2010 (35th)	Vincent Lindon	Welcome		Simon Calmat
2011 (36th)	**Éric Elmosnino**	**Gainsbourg: A Heroic Life**	**Gainsbourg (vie héroïque)**	**Serge Gainsbourg**
2011 (36th)	Gérard Depardieu	Mammuth		Serge Pilardosse
2011 (36th)	Romain Duris	Heartbreaker	L'Arnacœur	Alex Lippi
2011 (36th)	Jacques Gamblin	The Names of Love	Le Nom des gens	Arthur Martin
2011 (36th)	Lambert Wilson	Of Gods and Men	Des hommes et des dieux	Christian de Chergé
2012 (37th)	**Omar Sy**	**The Intouchables**	**Intouchables**	**Bakari "Driss" Bassari**
2012 (37th)	Sami Bouajila	Omar Killed Me	Omar m'a tuer	Omar Raddad
2012 (37th)	François Cluzet	The Intouchables	Intouchables	Philippe
2012 (37th)	Jean Dujardin (won the Academy Award)	The Artist		Georges Valentin
2012 (37th)	Olivier Gourmet	The Minister	L'exercice de l'État	Bertrand Saint-Jean
2012 (37th)	Denis Podalydès	The Conquest	La Conquête	Nicolas Sarkozy
2012 (37th)	Philippe Torreton	Présumé coupable		Alain Marécaux
2013 (38th)	**Jean-Louis Trintignant**	**Amour**		**Georges Laurent**
2013 (38th)	Jean-Pierre Bacri		Cherchez Hortense	Damien Hauer
2013 (38th)	Patrick Bruel	What's in a Name?	Le prénom	Vincent
2013 (38th)	Denis Lavant	Holy Motors		Mr. Oscar and various other roles
2013 (38th)	Vincent Lindon	A Few Hours of Spring	Quelques heures de printemps	Alain Évrard
2013 (38th)	Fabrice Luchini	In the House	Dans la maison	Germain Germain
2013 (38th)	Jérémie Renier	My Way	Cloclo	Claude François
2014 (39th)	**Guillaume Gallienne**	**Me, Myself and Mum**	**Les Garçons et Guillaume, à table!**	**Guillaume / Mother**
2014 (39th)	Mathieu Amalric	Venus in Fur	La Vénus à la fourrure	Thomas Novacheck
2014 (39th)	Michel Bouquet	Renoir		Auguste Renoir
2014 (39th)	Albert Dupontel	9 Month Stretch	Neuf mois ferme	Robert Nolan
2014 (39th)	Grégory Gadebois	One of a Kind	Mon âme par toi guérie	Frédi
2014 (39th)	Fabrice Luchini	Cycling with Moliere	Alceste à bicyclette	Serge Tanneur
2014 (39th)	Mads Mikkelsen	Michael Kohlhaas		Michael Kohlhaas
2015 (40th)	**Pierre Niney**	**Yves Saint Laurent**		**Yves Saint Laurent**
2015 (40th)	Niels Arestrup	Diplomacy	Diplomatie	General Dietrich von Cholitz
2015 (40th)	Guillaume Canet	Next Time I'll Aim for the Heart	La Prochaine fois je viserai le cœur	Franck
2015 (40th)	François Damiens	The Bélier Family	La Famille Bélier	Rodolphe Bélier
2015 (40th)	Romain Duris	The New Girlfriend	Une nouvelle amie	David / Virginia
2015 (40th)	Vincent Lacoste	Hippocrates	Hippocrate	Benjamin Barois
2015 (40th)	Gaspard Ulliel	Saint Laurent		Yves Saint Laurent
2016 (41st)	**Vincent Lindon**	**The Measure of a Man**	**La Loi du marché**	**Thierry Taugourdeau**
2016 (41st)	Jean-Pierre Bacri	The Very Private Life of Mister Sim	La Vie très privée de Monsieur Sim	François Sim
2016 (41st)	Vincent Cassel	Mon roi		Georgio
2016 (41st)	François Damiens	Cowboys	Les Cowboys	Alain Balland
2016 (41st)	Gérard Depardieu	Valley of Love		Gérard
2016 (41st)	Antonythasan Jesuthasan	Dheepan		Dheepan/Sivadhasan
2016 (41st)	Fabrice Luchini	Courted	L'Hermine	Michel Racine
2017 (42nd)	**Gaspard Ulliel**	**It's Only the End of the World**	**Juste la fin du monde**	**Louis**
2017 (42nd)	François Cluzet	Irreplaceable	Médecin de campagne	Jean-Pierre Werner
2017 (42nd)	Pierre Deladonchamps	A Kid	Le Fils de Jean	Mathieu
2017 (42nd)	Nicolas Duvauchelle	A Decent Man	Je ne suis pas un salaud	Eddie
2017 (42nd)	Fabrice Luchini	Slack Bay	Ma Loute	André Van Peteghem
2017 (42nd)	Pierre Niney	Frantz		Adrien
2017 (42nd)	Omar Sy	Chocolat		Chocolat
2018 (43rd)	**Swann Arlaud**	**Bloody Milk**	**Petit Paysan**	**Pierre Chavanges**
2018 (43rd)	Daniel Auteuil	Le Brio		Pierre Mazard
2018 (43rd)	Jean-Pierre Bacri	C'est la Vie!	La Sens de la Fête	Max
2018 (43rd)	Guillaume Canet	Rock'n Roll		Guillaume Canet
2018 (43rd)	Albert Dupontel	See You Up There	Au Revoir Là-Haut	Albert Maillard
2018 (43rd)	Louis Garrel	Redoubtable	Le Redoutable	Jean-Luc Godard
2018 (43rd)	Reda Kateb	Django		Django Reinhardt
2019 (44th)	**Alex Lutz**	**Guy**		**Guy Jamet**
2019 (44th)	Édouard Baer	Lady J	Mademoiselle de Joncquières	Marquis des Arcis
2019 (44th)	Romain Duris	Our Struggles	Nos batailles	Olivier
2019 (44th)	Vincent Lacoste	Amanda		David
2019 (44th)	Gilles Lellouche	In Safe Hands	Pupille	Jean
2019 (44th)	Pio Marmaï	The Trouble with You	En liberté !	Antoine Parent
2019 (44th)	Denis Ménochet	Custody	Jusqu'à la garde	Antoine Besson

=== 2020s ===
Year	Winner	English title	Original title	Role/Character
2020 (45th)	**Roschdy Zem**	**Oh Mercy!**	**Roubaix, une lumière**	**Daoud**
2020 (45th)	Daniel Auteuil	La Belle Époque		Victor Drumond
2020 (45th)	Damien Bonnard	Les Misérables		Brigadier Stéphane Ruiz
2020 (45th)	Vincent Cassel	The Specials	Hors normes	Bruno Haroche
2020 (45th)	Reda Kateb	The Specials	Hors normes	Malik
2020 (45th)	Jean Dujardin	An Officer and a Spy	J'accuse	Colonel Georges Picquart
2020 (45th)	Melvil Poupaud	By the Grace of God	Grâce à Dieu	Alexandre Guérin
2021 (46th)	**Sami Bouajila**	**A Son**	**Un fils**	**Fares Ben Youssef**
2021 (46th)	Jonathan Cohen	Enorme	Énorme	Frédéric
2021 (46th)	Albert Dupontel	Bye Bye Morons	Adieu les cons	JB
2021 (46th)	Niels Schneider	Love Affair(s)	Les Choses qu'on dit, les choses qu'on fait	Maxime
2021 (46th)	Lambert Wilson	De Gaulle		Charles de Gaulle
2022 (47th)	**Benoît Magimel**	**Peaceful**	**De son vivant**	**Benjamin Boltanski**
2022 (47th)	Damien Bonnard	The Restless	Les intranquilles	Damien
2022 (47th)	Adam Driver	Annette		Henry McHenry
2022 (47th)	Gilles Lellouche	The Stronghold	BAC Nord	Greg Cerva
2022 (47th)	Vincent Macaigne	The Night Doctor	Médecin de nuit	Mickaël Kourtchine
2022 (47th)	Pio Marmaï	The Divide	La fracture	Yann Caron
2022 (47th)	Pierre Niney	Black Box	Boîte noire	Mathieu Vasseur
2023 (48th)	**Benoît Magimel**	**Pacifiction**	**Pacifiction – Tourment sur les îles**	**De Roller**
2023 (48th)	Jean Dujardin	November	Novembre	Fred
2023 (48th)	Louis Garrel	The Innocent	L'innocent	Abel
2023 (48th)	Vincent Macaigne	Diary of a Fleeting Affair	Chronique d'une liaison passagère	Simon
2023 (48th)	Denis Ménochet	Peter von Kant		Peter Von Kant
2024 (49th)	**Arieh Worthalter**	**The Goldman Case**	**Le procès Goldman**	**Pierre Goldman**
2024 (49th)	Romain Duris	The Animal Kingdom	Le règne animal	François
2024 (49th)	Benjamin Lavernhe	Abbé Pierre – A Century of Devotion	L'abbé Pierre	Abbé Pierre
2024 (49th)	Melvil Poupaud	Just the Two of Us	L'amour et les forêts	Grégoire
2024 (49th)	Raphaël Quenard	Yannick		Yannick
2025 (50th)	**Karim Leklou**	**Jim's Story**	**Le Roman de Jim**	**Aymeric**
2025 (50th)	François Civil	Beating Hearts	L'Amour ouf	Clotaire
2025 (50th)	Benjamin Lavernhe	The Marching Band	En Fanfare	Thibaut Desormeaux
2025 (50th)	Pierre Niney	The Count of Monte Cristo	Le Comte de Monte-Cristo	Edmond Dantès / Lord Halifax / Abbé Busoni
2025 (50th)	Tahar Rahim	Monsieur Aznavour		Charles Aznavour
2026 (51st)	**Laurent Lafitte**	**The Richest Woman in the World**	**La femme la plus riche du monde**	**Pierre-Alain Fantin**
2026 (51st)	Bastien Bouillon	Leave One Day	Partir un jour	Raphaël
2026 (51st)	Benjamin Voisin	The Stranger	L'Étranger	Meursault
2026 (51st)	Claes Bang	The Great Arch	L'Inconnu de la Grande Arche	Johan Otto von Spreckelsen
2026 (51st)	Pio Marmaï	The Ties That Bind Us	L'Attachement	Alexandre "Alex" Perthuis

== History ==
=== Superlatives ===
Superlative	Best Actor		Best Supporting Actor		Overall (including Most Promising Actor)	
Actor with most awards	Michel Serrault	3	Niels Arestrup	3	Michel Serrault; Niels Arestrup; André Dussollier; Mathieu Amalric	3
Actor with most nominations	Gérard Depardieu	17	André Dussollier; Fabrice Luchini; Guy Marchand; Jean-Pierre Marielle	5	Gérard Depardieu	17
Actor with most nominations without ever winning	Patrick Dewaere	5	Jean-Pierre Marielle	5	Jean-Pierre Marielle	7
Film with most nominations	Le Sucre; Tandem; Itinerary of a Spoiled Child; Le Souper; Les Visiteurs; The Intouchables	2	Subway; Polisse	3	Subway; La Haine; The Officers' Ward; A Prophet	4
Oldest winner	Jean-Louis Trintignant	83	Michael Lonsdale	80	Jean-Louis Trintignant	83
Oldest nominee	Michel Bouquet	89	Jacques Dufilho	86	Michel Bouquet	89
Youngest winner	Pierre Niney	26	Jacques Villeret	28	Pierre Niney	26
Youngest nominee	Vincent Lacoste	22	Thomas Langmann	23	Milo Machado-Graner	15

== Multiple wins and nominations ==
The following individuals received two or more Best Actor awards:

Wins	Actor
3	Michel Serrault
2	Mathieu Amalric
2	Daniel Auteuil
2	Michel Bouquet
2	Gérard Depardieu
2	Benoît Magimel
2	Philippe Noiret

The following individuals received three or more Best Actor nominations:

Nominations	Actor
17	Gérard Depardieu
14	Daniel Auteuil
7	Michel Serrault
6	Jean-Pierre Bacri
6	François Cluzet
6	Vincent Lindon
6	Fabrice Luchini
5	Vincent Cassel
5	Patrick Dewaere
5	Romain Duris
5	Philippe Noiret
4	Charles Berling
4	Michel Blanc
4	Jean Dujardin
4	Albert Dupontel
4	Pierre Niney
4	Michel Piccoli
4	Jean Rochefort
4	Philippe Torreton
3	Mathieu Amalric
3	Michel Bouquet
3	Claude Brasseur
3	Alain Chabat
3	Alain Delon
3	Gérard Jugnot
3	Jean-Pierre Marielle
3	Jean-Louis Trintignant
3	Lambert Wilson

One actor has the record of most consecutive nominations with 4: Gerard Depardieu (1977, 1978, 1979, 1980/ 1983, 1984, 1985, 1986/ 1988, 1989, 1990, 1991)

== See also ==
- Academy Award for Best Actor
- Actor Award for Outstanding Performance by a Male Actor in a Leading Role
- BAFTA Award for Best Actor
- Critics' Choice Movie Award for Best Actor
- European Film Award for Best Actor
- Lumière Award for Best Actor
- Magritte Award for Best Actor
