= Judith Therpauve =

- Directed by: Patrice Chéreau
- Written by: Patrice Chéreau; Georges Conchon
- Produced by: Alfred de Graff; Léon Jerusalmi; Rafaël Najar; Robert Paillardon; Olivier Thual; Liliane Weinstadt
- Starring: Simone Signoret
- Cinematography: Pierre Lhomme
- Edited by: Françoise Bonnot
- Production company: Gaumont
- Distributed by: Gaumont Distribution
- Release date: October 6, 1978
- Running time: 125 minutes
- Language: French
- Box office: $1.4 million

Judith Therpauve is a French drama film directed by Patrice Chéreau.

== Plot ==
Therpauve Judith, who was "Queen" in the days of the Resistance, is asked by her former friends to take charge of the daily regional newspaper "The Free Republic". She quickly realizes that the poor financial health of the newspaper is orchestrated by a businessman who wants to buy it back at a low price. Judith manages to drive up sales, but unfair maneuvers succeed and they are forced to sell. Feeling useless and alone, and with little support from her staff, she commits suicide.

== Cast ==
- Simone Signoret : Judith Therpauve
- Philippe Léotard : Jean-Pierre Maurier
- Robert Manuel : Droz
- François Simon : Claude Hirsch-Balland
- Daniel Lecourtois : Desfraizeaux
- László Szabó : Lepage
- Daniel Schmid : Jean
- Bernard-Pierre Donnadieu : Laindreaux
- Marcel Imhoff : Pierre Damien
- Jean Rougeul : Genty
- Alain David : Louis
- Jean Rougerie : Fournol
- Hermine Karagheuz : Nicole
- Gérard Dournel : Lecacheux
- Jean Berger : Marc Loussier
- Laurence Bourdil : Marianne
- Marie-Paule André : Jeanne
- Anne Delbée : Gisèle
- Fabienne Arel : Sonia
- Philippe Castelli : The Bailiff

== Accolades ==
Year	Award	Category	Recipient	Result
1979	César Awards	César Award for Best Cinematography	Pierre Lhomme	Nominated
1979	César Awards	César Award for Best Sound	Harald Maury	Nominated
