= Le Sucre =

1978 French crime comedy film by Jacques Rouffio

- Film poster
- Directed by: Jacques Rouffio
- Written by: Jacques Rouffio; Georges Conchon
- Produced by: Lise Fayolle; Giorgio Silvagni
- Starring: Jean Carmet; Gérard Depardieu
- Cinematography: René Mathelin
- Edited by: Geneviève Winding
- Music by: Philippe Sarde
- Production company: Gaumont
- Distributed by: Gaumont Distribution
- Release date: 15 November 1978
- Running time: 104 minutes
- Country: France
- Language: French
- Box office: $5.7 million

Le Sucre (or The Sugar) is a 1978 French crime comedy film directed by Jacques Rouffio. The film recounts a fraud case, on the basis of the speculative bubble on the price of sugar in 1974.

== Plot ==
Raoul (Gerard Depardieu) is a hot-shot commodities broker who sweet-talks Adrien (Jean Carmet), a quiet and unassuming man, into taking his wife's inheritance and using it to speculate on the recent rise in sugar prices. Raoul is able to pry more money away from Adrien when he shows him how much his first, more conservative speculations have made. But the con-man is taken in by his own con, for Raoul has also entered the sugar market, using every bit of money he can scrape together. When the market turns around, they are both in trouble.

== Cast ==
- Jean Carmet as Adrien Courtois
- Gérard Depardieu as Raoul-Renaud Homecourt
- Michel Piccoli as Grezillo
- Nelly Borgeaud as Hilda Courtois
- Georges Descrières as Vandelmont
- Roger Hanin as Karbaoui
- Marthe Villalonga as Madame Karbaoui
- Claude Piéplu as President Berot
- Pierre Vernier : Latoussaint
- Maurice Chevit as Lomont
- Jean-Claude Dreyfus as Mimine
- Jean-Paul Muel as Pergamont
- Tony Taffin as Flanqué
- Jean Champion

== Accolades ==
Year	Award	Category	Recipient	Result
1979	César Awards	Best Actor	Jean Carmet	Nominated
1979	César Awards	Best Actor	Gérard Depardieu	Nominated
1979	César Awards	Best Supporting Actor	Jean Carmet	Nominated
1979	César Awards	Best Supporting Actress	Nelly Borgeaud	Nominated
1979	César Awards	Best Screenplay, Dialogue or Adaptation	Georges Conchon & Jacques Rouffio	Nominated
