= Cousin Cousine =

1975 film by Jean-Charles Tacchella

- Theatrical release poster
- Directed by: Jean-Charles Tacchella
- Written by: Jean-Charles Tacchella; Danièle Thompson
- Produced by: Daniel Toscan du Plantier
- Starring: Marie-Christine Barrault; Victor Lanoux; Marie-France Pisier; Guy Marchand; Ginette Garcin
- Cinematography: Georges Lendi; Eric Faucherre; Michel Thiriet
- Edited by: Agnès Guillemot; Marie-Aimée Debril; Juliette Welfling
- Music by: Gérard Anfosso
- Production companies: Films Pomereu; Gaumont
- Distributed by: Gaumont Distribution
- Release date: 19 November 1975
- Running time: 95 minutes
- Country: France
- Language: French
- Budget: €400,000
- Box office: 2,011,394 tickets (EU); $10 million (US/Canada) or $3.7 million

Cousin Cousine is a 1975 French romantic comedy film directed by Jean-Charles Tacchella and starring Marie-Christine Barrault, Victor Lanoux, Marie-France Pisier, Guy Marchand and Ginette Garcin. Written by Tacchella and Danièle Thompson, the film is about two cousins by marriage who meet at a wedding and develop a close friendship. After their spouses prove unfaithful, the cousins' friendship leads to a passionate love affair.

Cousin Cousine received an Academy Award nomination for Best Foreign Language Film, a César Award nomination for Best Film and a Golden Globe Award nomination for Best Foreign Language Film, and was selected by the National Board of Review Award as one of the Top Five Foreign Films of 1976. An English-language remake, Cousins, was released in 1989.

== Plot ==
Two cousins related by marriage, Marthe and Ludovic, meet at a family wedding for the first time. Marthe is the bride's daughter, and Ludovic is the groom's nephew. After a raucous wedding reception with plenty of dancing and drinking, Marthe and Ludovic are left waiting for their respective spouses, Pascal and Karine, who are off having sex. While they wait, they get to know each other: Marthe is a secretary, and Ludovic is a dance instructor who changes his occupation every three years. They later dance together. Eventually, Pascal and Karine show up, slightly disheveled, and the couples part.

Ludovic meets Marthe for lunch and tells her that her husband is having an affair with his wife. Later, Pascal informs her that he has broken off all of his affairs and that, from now on, she will be the only one. When Marthe tells him she knows about Karine, he says he only had her "three times in the bushes".

Some time later at a family gathering at Marthe's mother's house, Ludovic's teenage daughter, Nelsa, shows slides she took at the wedding—including compromising photos of Pascal and Karine. During the slideshow, Marthe's mother's new husband dies. At the funeral, Ludovic's father arrives and extends his condolences; he too lost his spouse recently. On the way back from the cemetery, Marthe and Ludovic become better acquainted, with Marthe revealing that she enjoys swimming and singing.

Later that week, Marthe and Ludovic meet for lunch, buy bathing suits, and go swimming in a public pool. They enjoy each other's company so much that they decide to take the rest of the day off together to go shopping and see a film. Although their relationship is platonic, Pascal and Karine begin to grow jealous. Marthe and Ludovic playfully arrange to meet by chance at a restaurant with their respective families, to see how Pascal and Karine react. Later that week, Marthe and Ludovic meet again at the swimming pool and acknowledge that their relationship is special and must remain that way, even if platonic.

At another family wedding, with Pascal and the groom's father fighting over a business deal gone wrong, Marthe and Ludovic decide to leave and spend the day together. They return to find a drunken Pascal harassing the guests, and soon they all leave the disastrous wedding and bring Pascal home. Marthe's mother and Ludovic's father develop a close friendship and plan to spend time at his vineyard. Marthe and Ludovic discuss their own relationship and decide that it is absurd to keep it platonic. For once, they will do something for themselves, and not for their spouses and families.

That Saturday, Marthe and Ludovic meet and spend the day together having sex. The following morning, they extend their stay another day, having sex, exchanging recipes, and bathing together.

In the coming days, Pascal reverts to his philandering ways, Karine leaves Ludovic and then returns, and Marthe's mother and Ludovic's father discover they are not as compatible as they thought. Marthe and Ludovic's relationship, however, continues to grow. At a Christmas family gathering at Marthe's mother's house, Marthe and Ludovic lock themselves in a bedroom and have sex throughout the evening while their families eat, drink, watch Midnight Mass, and exchange gifts. The couple finally emerges from the bedroom, says goodbye to their families, and rides off into the night together.

== Cast ==
- Marie-Christine Barrault as Marthe
- Victor Lanoux as Ludovic
- Marie-France Pisier as Karine
- Guy Marchand as Pascal
- Ginette Garcin as Biju, Marthe and Diane's mother
- Sybil Maas as Diane, Marthe's sister
- Popeck (credited as Jean Herbert) as Sacy, Diane's husband
- Pierre Plessis as Gobert, Ludovic's uncle
- Catherine Verlor as Nelsa, Ludovic's daughter
- Hubert Gignoux as Thomas, Ludovic's father
- Catherine Stermann as Monique, one of Pascal's lovers

== Reception ==
=== Box office ===
Cousin Cousine was the 35th highest-grossing film of 1975 in France, with 1,161,394 cinema admissions. At the Paris Theater in Manhattan, the film broke the attendance records set 10 years earlier by A Man and a Woman.

=== Critical response ===
On the review aggregator website Rotten Tomatoes, Cousin Cousine holds an approval rating of 100% based on five reviews, with an average rating of 7.8/10.

In his review in the Chicago Sun-Times, Roger Ebert gave the film three-and-a-half stars out of four, writing:

Cousin Cousine tells the story of an impossible love affair, and the two people who make it gloriously possible. That would be enough in itself—blind faith in romance is so rare these days—but for some lucky reason the movie gives us more. It gives us, first of all, one of the most engaging and likable couples in recent movies. It gives us a feeling of a real human milieu, of the families these people belong in. ... They dance, they tell each other little things about themselves and a sudden, healthy, sensual affection is born. ... There is no doubt at all, of course, that they're in love. But they don't sleep together for quite a long time, partly because what they have is so unexpected and precious that they want to savor it.

In his review in The New York Times, Vincent Canby called the film "an exceptionally winning, wittily detailed comedy that is as much about family relationships as it is about love." Canby goes on to write:

In a rather startling way, no one seems to get seriously hurt in this film, even though there are deaths and profound disappointments, not because Mr. Tacchella takes a superficially rosy view of things, but because, with the help of his actors, he creates a group of characters who appear either to have inner resources or, like Karine, to be too self-absorbed to feel anything too deeply. Miss Barrault, who is the niece of Jean-Louis; Miss Pisier, Mr. Lanoux and Mr. Marchand are very good company, especially when they are misbehaving. Cousin, Cousine possesses a heart that is both light and generous.

=== Accolades ===
- 1975 Louis Delluc Prize (Jean-Charles Tacchella) Won
- 1976 César Award for Best Supporting Actress (Marie-France Pisier) Won
- 1976 César Award Nomination for Best Actor (Victor Lanoux)
- 1976 César Award Nomination for Best Film (Jean-Charles Tacchella)
- 1976 César Award Nomination for Best Screenplay, Dialogue or Adaptation (Jean-Charles Tacchella)
- 1976 San Sebastián International Film Festival Silver Seashell Award (Jean-Charles Tacchella) Won
- 1976 National Board of Review Award for Top Five Foreign Films Won
- 1977 Academy Award Nomination for Best Actress in a Leading Role (Marie-Christine Barrault)
- 1977 Academy Award Nomination for Best Foreign Language Film
- 1977 Academy Award Nomination for Best Original Screenplay (Jean-Charles Tacchella, Danièle Thompson)
- 1977 Golden Globe Award Nomination for Best Foreign Language Film
- 1978 Kansas City Film Critics Circle Award for Best Foreign Film Won

== See also ==
- List of submissions to the 49th Academy Awards for Best Foreign Language Film
- List of French submissions for the Academy Award for Best Foreign Language Film
