= Lectures pour tous =

French television show

- Directed by: Pierre Dumayet
- Presented by: Pierre Dumayet; Max-Pol Fouchet; Pierre Desgraupes
- Country of origin: France
- Original language: French

Production
- Camera setup: Multi-camera
- Running time: 22–24 minutes

Original release
- Network: RTF
- Release: March 27, 1953 – May 8, 1968

Lectures pour tous is the first French television show discussing literature. The show was created and presented by Pierre Dumayet, and was broadcast from March 27, 1953, to May 8, 1968, on RTF.

== Premise ==
The shows principle was to analyse and review literature on television. Authors of books were interviewed and discussed, the show was designed to entertain and educate the French viewing public. People of all backgrounds were invited to discuss literature on the show.

== Reception ==
The show was critically acclaimed for elevating the quality of television on French television. According to Le Monde in 1962, Lectures pour tous had between 26% and 32% of the French viewing public.
