= My Brother-in-Law Killed My Sister =

- Theatrical release poster
- French: Mon beau-frère a tué ma sœur
- Directed by: Jacques Rouffio
- Written by: Georges Conchon; Jacques Rouffio
- Produced by: Giorgio Silvagni
- Starring: Michel Serrault; Michel Piccoli; Jean Carmet; Juliette Binoche; Milva
- Cinematography: Jacques Loiseleux
- Edited by: Anna Ruiz
- Music by: Philippe Sarde
- Production companies: Cinéproduction; France 3 Cinéma
- Distributed by: Gaumont Distribution
- Release date: 5 March 1986 (France)
- Running time: 95 minutes
- Country: France
- Language: French

My Brother-in-Law Killed My Sister (French: Mon beau-frère a tué ma soeur, (French pronunciation: [mɔ̃bofʁɛʁ atɥe masœʁ]) is a 1986 French comedy thriller film directed by Jacques Rouffio. It played in competition at the 36th Berlin International Film Festival. In the film, two members of the Académie Française agree to help attractive young veterinarian Esther investigate the suspicious death of her sister. Esther is convinced her brother-in-law is responsible, but soon it becomes apparent that those responsible are linked to the very highest echelons of power in the Vatican.

== Plot ==
The films begins at a ceremony in which anthropologist Étienne Sembadel is honouring his co-worker and longtime friend Octave Clapoteau. At the event, a young veterinarian named Esther Bouloire – with whom Sembadel had previously spoken at one of his lectures—approaches the two men and insists that they dine together.

After revealing that she thinks her brother-in-law murdered her sister Genevieve and burned the body, the two academics inform Esther that it's crazy to assume her sister's disappearance for 2 years means she's dead and they promptly check her into a mental health clinic. Upon her release, Sembadel and Clapoteau accompany the heavily medicated Esther as she recklessly drives to her veterinary practice, shoots up the office of her late father's law business, and shows them her house and the house of her “evil” cousin Muriel.

Esther explains that her father and her Uncle Leopold – Muriel's father – went into business together as the Bouloire Brothers and that both men and their wives died recently in mysterious car accidents. The business was taken over by the hunchbacked third brother, Jocelyn, whom Esther believes arranged the death of her sister at the hands of her brother-in-law.

At Esther's request, Sembadel and Clapoteau visit the brother-in-law but find that he's nothing more than an eccentric sports enthusiast. The two academics decide to take the initiative and visit Jocelyn Bouloire-Haussmann. Jocelyn assures them that his niece Genevieve just ran away and that the man mentioned by Homecourt—Munoz—is dead and not a lead worth pursuing. Less than two hours later, Clapoteau's recently arrived Roman lover, the Countess Renata Palozzi, is beaten up by thugs. The two academics, suspecting Jocelyn, angrily confront Esther but are scolded for visiting him without being asked.

The next morning, Jocelyn calls Sembadel to tell him that he's remembered Genevieve was fond of a Swiss lawyer named Bongrand. Sembadel and Clapoteau fly to Geneva and Mr Bongrand tells them that he doesn't know anyone called Genevieve but she might’ve been an acquaintance of his son, Paul Bongrand Jr., who died in a climbing accident in the Dolomites a fortnight ago. Soon after, the two academics are arrested by the police on suspicion of involvement in the death of Bongrand Jr., also known as Munoz.

Back in France, Homecourt comes looking for help from Muriel but finds Esther instead. He reveals to her that three killers are after him because someone told Jocelyn that he revealed the name Munoz to Sembadel and Clapoteau. He admits that he and many others were collectively responsible for Munoz's murder but that he doesn't know where Genevieve has gone. Esther kicks him out of the house and he is shot dead as soon as he passes the driveway gate.

Three days later, Jocelyn approaches Sembadel's wife and tells her that Esther and her husband are responsible for the death of the Viscount of Homecourt. Mrs Sembadel throws her husband out. Shortly after, the two academics are run off the road by a car. They decide to strike back at Jocelyn with an article in Left-Weekly detailing the 12 murders: the 6 by Homecourt in Europe, Esther's 2 aunts and 2 uncles, and Homecourt himself. Esther presents the journalists with documents found in her sister's safe that incriminate 41 people, including 3 ministers. Esther, feeling victorious, confronts Jocelyn. He is initially unshaken but his advisor warns him that the article might embarrass him by making him seem incapable of controlling his own niece.

The next day, Muriel is shot dead by 3 assassins while leaving the Bouloire-Haussmann offices. Esther and Leon (Muriel's husband) collect Sembadel and Clapoteau from their apartment and flee the city. Leon decides that he must return for his wife's funeral but he is shot on his way home. Sembadel, Clapoteau and Esther head to the Countess’ chateau but arrive to find that it has been burned down. They follow the now-homeless Countess to Rome where she somehow arranges for the safety of all four of them. Unfortunately, moments after receiving this guarantee of safety, Sembadel and Clapoteau are gunned down near the Vatican.

The film ends with the two academics happily dancing around in Heaven.

== Cast ==
- Michel Serrault as Octave Clapoteau
- Michel Piccoli as Étienne Sembadel
- Juliette Binoche as Esther
- Jean Carmet as Jocelyn Bouloire
- Milva as Renata Palozzi
- Jean-Pierre Bisson as H
- Tom Novembre as Leo
- Isabelle Petit-Jacques as Micheline
- Agnès Garreau as Muriel
- Francis Girod as the TV interviewer
- Didier Flamand as the Journalist
- Gérard Klein as the radio journalist
- Marie-Hélène Lentini
