= The Savage State =

- Theatrical release poster
- Directed by: Francis Girod
- Written by: Francis Girod; Georges Conchon
- Based on: L'État sauvage by Georges Conchon
- Produced by: Francis Girod; Michel Piccoli
- Starring: Michel Piccoli; Marie-Christine Barrault; Claude Brasseur; Jacques Dutronc
- Cinematography: Pierre Lhomme
- Edited by: Geneviève Winding
- Music by: Pierre Jansen
- Production company: Gaumont
- Distributed by: Gaumont Distribution
- Release date: 19 April 1978
- Running time: 115 minutes
- Language: French
- Box office: $7.7 million

The Savage State (or L'état sauvage) is a French drama film directed by Francis Girod.

== Plot ==
In 1960, Minister of Information of a progressive African state still under French colonial rule, the doctor Patrice Doumbe also fighting against the compromises of his own government. Avit Laurençon happens, international official mission as spouses and Laurence, a French whose connection with Doumbe people talking the colony, under the eyes of his ex-lover, Gravenoire trafficker and Orlaville, the local police commissioner .

== Cast ==
- Michel Piccoli : Orlaville
- Marie-Christine Barrault : Laurence
- Claude Brasseur : Gravenoire
- Jacques Dutronc : Avit Laurençon
- Doura Mané : Patrice Doumbe
- Rüdiger Vogler : Tristan
- Sidiki Bakaba : Cornac
- Alphonse Beni : The Minister
- Baaron : Modimbo
- Umban U'kset : Kotoko
- Jean-Baptiste Tiemele : Gohanda
- Peter Bachelier : Renard
- Philippe Brizard : Paul
- Celia : Irène
- Akonio Dolo : Elie
- Joseph Momo : Raoul

== Production ==
Principal photography took place from 4 November 1977 to 10 January 1978. The film was shot in French Guiana, including in Saint-Laurent-du-Maroni and Cayenne.

== Accolades ==
Year	Award	Category	Recipient	Result
1979	César Awards	César Award for Best Sound	William Robert Sivel	Won
1979	César Awards	César Award for Best Editing	Geneviève Winding	Nominated
