= Nara Kollery =

Sound recordist from India

Narayanan Valiya Kollery was a Cesar award-winning sound recordist from Mahé in Kerala, India, who worked primarily in France.

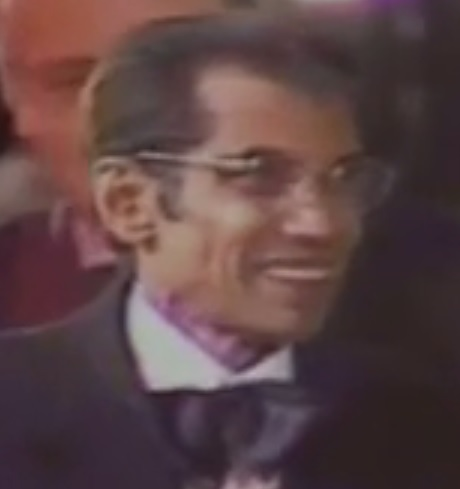

== Work ==
Kollery worked as a sound recordist and mixer in Paris, France and worked on the following films:

- 1985 – Asterix Versus Caesar – sound recordist
- 1983 – The Moon in the Gutter – sound mixer
- 1980 – Fantômas – sound mixer
- 1978 – The Spat – sound mixer
- 1977 – Why Not! – sound mixer
- 1976 – Néa – sound mixer
- 1976 – The Wing and the Thigh – sound mixer
- 1975 – Black Moon – sound recordist
- 1975 – Chobizenesse – sound mixer
- 1974 – My Little Loves – sound mixer
- 1973 – Don't Know Anything But I'll Tell All - sound re-recording mixer

He received a César Award for his work in the movie Black Moon.

== Personal life ==
He has a son named Christophe Valiya-Kollery, born in the 1960s.

Nara Kollery died in Paris on 9 December 2015.
