= Le vieux fusil =

- Theatrical release poster
- Directed by: Robert Enrico
- Written by: Robert Enrico; Pascal Jardin; Claude Veillot
- Produced by: Pierre Caro
- Starring: Philippe Noiret; Romy Schneider; Jean Bouise
- Cinematography: Étienne Becker
- Edited by: Ava Zora; Eva Zora
- Music by: François de Roubaix
- Production companies: Les Productions Artistes Associés; Mercure Productions; TIT Filmproduktion GmbH
- Distributed by: Les Artistes Associés (France); Mercure Productions (West Germany)
- Release date: 22 August 1975
- Running time: 103 minutes
- Countries: France; West Germany
- Language: French
- Box office: 3,365,471 admissions (France)

Le vieux fusil (English title: The Old Gun or Vengeance One by One) is a 1975 French-West German war drama film directed by Robert Enrico, and starring Philippe Noiret, Romy Schneider and Jean Bouise. It won the 1976 César Award for Best Film, Best Actor and Best Music, and was nominated for best director, supporting actor, Screenplay, Dialogue or Adaptation, cinematography, editing and sound. The film is based on the Massacre of Oradour-sur-Glane in 1944.

== Plot ==
In Montauban in 1944, following the Invasion of Normandy, Julien Dandieu, a pacifist surgeon and convinced humanist, leads a comfortable middle class life with his wife Clara and his daughter Florence, born from a previous union. As a member of the French Resistance, he provides treatment to the Maquisards in his hospital and is regularly threatened by the French Milice. Worried about the advances of German troops entering Montauban, Dandieu asks his friend Francois to drive his wife and his daughter to the remote village where he owns a château. One week later, Dandieu sets off to meet them for the weekend but the Germans have occupied the village. He finds that all the villagers have been herded into the church and shot. In the château, now occupied by the Germans, he finds his daughter shot and his wife immolated by a flame-thrower.

Dandieu decides to kill as many Germans as possible to avenge his family. He takes an old shotgun he used as a child while hunting with his father and sabotages the château's bridge before he starts to kill them one by one, taking advantage of his knowledge of the secret passages within the château. Trapped inside the castle, the Germans begin to think their attackers are French partisans and do not realise that Dandieu is their only assailant. When a Resistance detachment arrives, Dandieu refuses their offer to help and continues his vendetta on his own. Eventually, with no more cartridges for the shotgun, he collects the flame-thrower which killed his beloved wife and uses it to kill the leading SS officer as he, the last survivor, is about to commit suicide.

Alerted by the Resistance, the inhabitants of a nearby village and a company of American soldiers arrive to collect the dead. Dandieu is picked up by Francois but has suffered a nervous breakdown following the aftermath of the slaughter, behaving as if his family was still alive. The film ends with a flashback to one of his happier days now gone, where he and his family had undertaken a bike tour.

== Cast ==
- Philippe Noiret as Julien Dandieu
- Romy Schneider as Clara Dandieu
- Jean Bouise as François
- Joachim Hansen as SS Officer
- Robert Hoffmann as SS Lieutenant
- Karl Michael Vogler as Dr. Müller
- Madeleine Ozeray as Julien's Mother

== See also ==
- Bruniquel, in the Tarn-et-Garonne department, the village where the film was shot.
- Château de Bruniquel, the landmark of the village, where most of the film was shot.
