= L'Argent des autres =

1978 film

- Film poster
- Directed by: Christian de Chalonge
- Screenplay by: Pierre Dumayet; Christian de Chalonge
- Based on: L'Argent des autres by Nancy Markham
- Produced by: Michelle de Broca; Henri Lassa; Adolphe Viezzi
- Starring: Jean-Louis Trintignant; Catherine Deneuve; Claude Brasseur; Michel Serrault
- Cinematography: Jean-Louis Picavet
- Edited by: Jean Ravel
- Music by: Guy Boulanger; Patrice Mestral
- Distributed by: NPF Planfilm
- Release date: 27 September 1978
- Running time: 105 minutes
- Country: France
- Language: French

L'Argent des autres (Other People's Money) is a 1978 French drama film directed by Christian de Chalonge, and starring Jean-Louis Trintignant, Catherine Deneuve, Claude Brasseur and Michel Serrault. It won the Louis Delluc Prize and the César Award for Best Film and Best Director, and was nominated for Best Supporting Actor, Best Screenplay, Dialogue or Adaptation and Best Editing.

== Plot ==
Henri Rainier is a senior manager at the Miremant bank. He makes loans to an adventurous client, the Chevalier d'Aven, knowing that he has the backing of his superiors. However, the relationship proves financially disastrous, and the bank is faced with having to cover up its massive deficit.

The bank's directors want to disassociate themselves from the scandal and, as Rainier's client is now accused of fraud, they make him a scapegoat and fire him on the spot. However, Rainier refuses to take it lying down, knowing that the bank's directors approved every loan. His wife Cécile and the union representative Arlette suggest he sue his former employers. Determined not to be the scapegoat, and anxious to avoid possible criminal charges, Rainier sets out to prove the bank's responsibility for this and other shady transactions.

But as a senior bank manager who has been sacked, he finds he has become unemployable. He breaks into the bank's archives and finds incriminating evidence, but nobody believes him, assuming he is just a disgruntled ex-employee. The Chevalier d'Aven gets five years in prison and the bank is exonerated in the eyes of the world, having apparently been the innocent victim of a cunning crook and an incompetent manager. Since everyone agrees that Rainier could conduct a perfect business lunch, he ultimately ends up training young hopefuls in this subtle art.

== Cast ==
- Jean-Louis Trintignant as Henri Rainier
- Catherine Deneuve as Cécile Rainier
- Claude Brasseur as Claude Chevalier d'Aven
- Michel Serrault as Miremant
- Gérard Séty as De Nully
- Jean Leuvrais as Heldorff
- François Perrot as Vincent
- Umberto Orsini as Blue
- Michel Berto as Duval
- Francis Lemaire as Torrent
- Juliet Berto as Arlette Rivière
- Raymond Bussières as Claude Chevalier d'Aven's father
- Moune de Rivel as La chanteuse antillaise
