= Let Joy Reign Supreme =

Que la fête commence Let Joy Reign Supreme
- Directed by: Bertrand Tavernier
- Written by: Jean Aurenche; Bertrand Tavernier
- Produced by: Michelle de Broca; Yves Robert
- Starring: Philippe Noiret; Jean-Pierre Marielle
- Cinematography: Pierre-William Glenn
- Edited by: Armand Psenny
- Music by: Philippe II, Duke of Orléans
- Production companies: Fildebroc Productions; Franco London Films; Productions de la Gueville; Union des Producteurs de Films
- Distributed by: Cinema International Corporation
- Release date: 23 March 1975
- Running time: 114 minutes
- Country: France
- Language: French
- Box office: $8.4 million

Que la fête commence... (English title Let Joy Reign Supreme) is a 1975 French film directed by Bertrand Tavernier and starring Philippe Noiret. It is a historical drama set during the 18th century French Régence centring on the Breton Pontcallec Conspiracy.

It won the French Syndicate of Cinema Critics Prix Méliès, and the César Award for Best Director, Best Supporting Actor, Best Screenplay, Dialogue or Adaptation and Best Production Design, and was nominated for Best Film, Best Supporting Actress and Best Music.

== Plot ==
In France in 1719, Philippe II, Duke of Orléans is the regent for the young Louis XV. He is sophisticated, gentle, a liberal and a libertine. He endeavours to keep his subjects cultured and happy—mainly to stop the peasants from rising up—but he knows he has no real royal authority. To assist him, Philippe enlists the aid of an atheistic and venal priest named Guillaume Dubois, another libertine who does not care for anyone except himself. The film begins with the gruesome autopsy of Marie Louise Élisabeth d'Orléans, Duchess of Berry, elder daughter of the Regent who died on 21 July 1719, her health fatally ruined by her debauched life and a series of clandestine pregnancies. Notoriously promiscuous, Joufflotte ("chubby")—as she was nicknamed because of her generous proportions—was rumoured to have committed incest with her father. The autopsy reveals that the Rubenesque princess was again pregnant. Philippe is very much affected by her death. Meanwhile, a rebellion led by a Breton squire named Pontcallec occurs. Philippe's natural idealism is further shaken when he is forced to execute Pontcallec's band of revolutionaries. Dubois, however, tries to take advantage of the revolt and subsequent famine to become archbishop. It becomes apparent that true joy will only be found when the peasants successfully overthrow the aristocrats who have held them down for so long.

The film provides a description of 18th century life at court, and features the music of the real Philippe d'Orléans.

== Cast ==
- Philippe Noiret - Philippe d'Orléans
- Jean Rochefort - L'abbé Dubois
- Jean-Pierre Marielle - Le marquis de Pontcallec
- Marina Vlady - Marie-Madeleine de Parabère
- Christine Pascal - Emilie
- Alfred Adam - Villeroi
- Jean-Roger Caussimon - Le cardinal
- Gérard Desarthe - Duke of Bourbon
- Michel Beaune - Le capitaine La Griollais
- Monique Chaumette - La gouvernante de Pontcallec
- François Dyrek - Montlouis
- Jean-Paul Farré - Le père Burdo
- Nicole Garcia - La Fillon
- Raymond Girard - Chirac
- Jacques Hilling - L'abbé Gratellard
- Bernard La Jarrige - Amaury de Lambilly
- Hélène Vincent - Madame de Saint-Simon
- Michel Blanc - Le valet de chambre de Louis XV
- Christian Clavier - Le valet de l'auberge / Pickpocket
- Thierry Lhermitte - Count of Horn
- Brigitte Roüan - The prostitute

== Awards and nominations ==
- César Awards (France)
  - Won: Best Actor – Supporting Role (Jean Rochefort)
  - Won: Best Director (Bertrand Tavernier)
  - Won: Best Production Design (Pierre Guffroy)
  - Won: Best Screenplay, Dialogue or Adaptation (Jean Aurenche and Bertrand Tavernier)
  - Nominated: Best Actress – Supporting Role (Christine Pascal)
  - Nominated: Best Film
  - Nominated: Best Music (Philippe d'Orléans and Antoine Duhamel)
- French Syndicate of Cinema Critics (France)
  - Won: Best Film (Bertrand Tavernier)
