= Pierre Dumayet =

French journalist, screenwriter and producer (1923–2011)

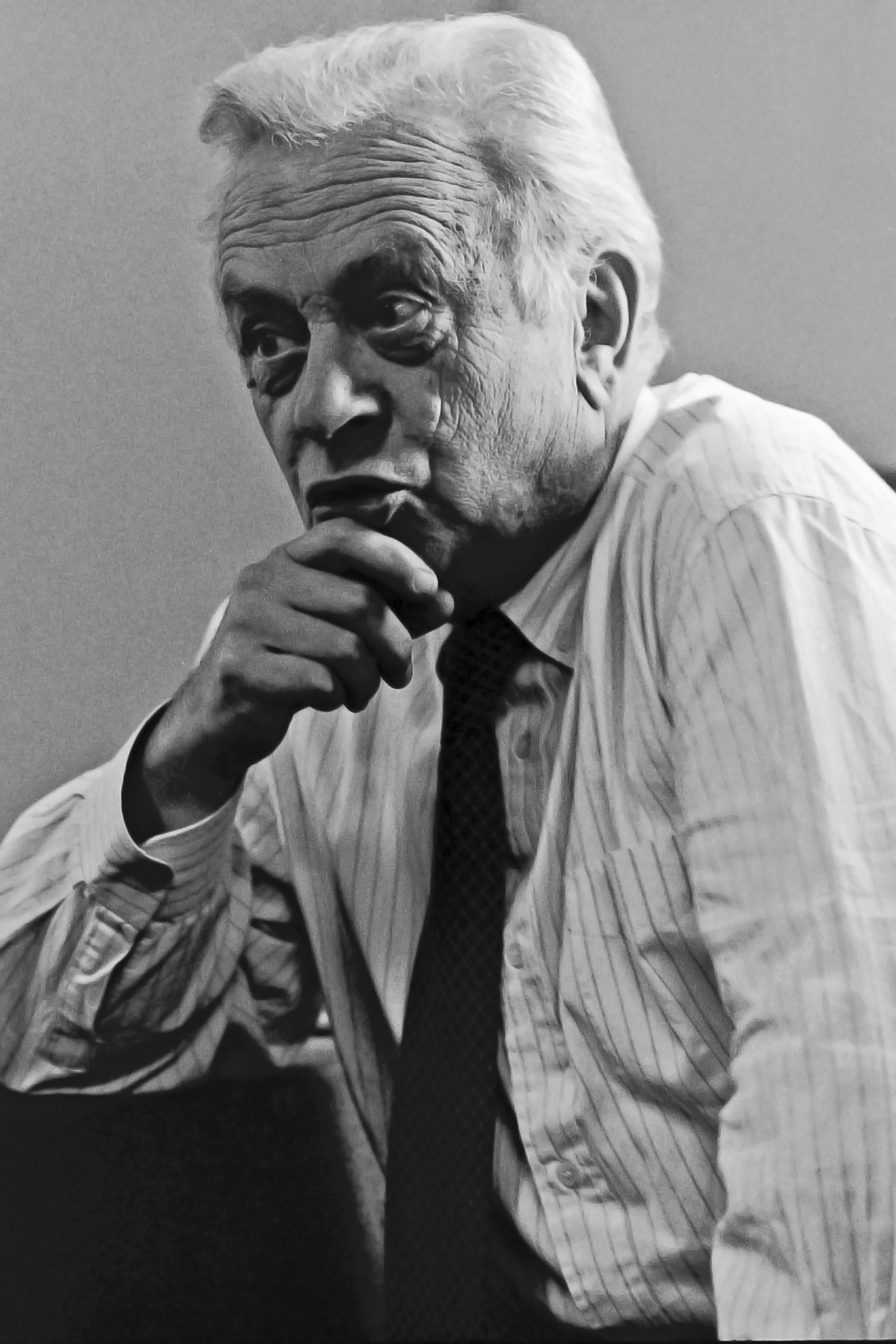
- Born: 24 February 1923; Houdan, France
- Died: 17 November 2011 (aged 88); Paris, France
- Occupation: Television presenter
- Known for: Lectures pour tous
- Children: Nicolas Dumayet

Pierre Dumayet (February 24, 1923 – November 17, 2011) was a French journalist, screenwriter and producer, who was a pioneer of French television. Dumayet is best known for presenting the television show Lectures pour tous.

== Filmography ==
=== Screenwriter ===
==== Cinema ====
- To Die of Love (1971)
- There's No Smoke Without Fire (1973)
- Verdict (1974)
- L'Argent des autres (1978) (dialogue)
- Malevil (1981) (screenwriter)
- The Malady of Love (1986) (screenwriter) ("La coda del diavolo" - (original Italian title)
