= Georges Conchon =

French writer and screenwriter

- Born: 9 May 1925 Saint-Avit, Puy-de-Dôme, France
- Died: 29 July 1990 (aged 65) Paris, France
- Genre: novels; screenwriting
- Notable works: L'État sauvage; Judith Therpauve
- Notable awards: Chevalier de la Legion of Honour and an Officer of the Order of Merit and Arts and Letters

Georges Conchon (French pronunciation: [ʒɔʁʒ kɔ̃ʃɔ̃]; 9 May 1925 – 29 July 1990) was a French writer and screenwriter.

== Biography ==
He grew up in a family of teachers, and after graduating in philosophy, passed the support of the parliamentary and between the Assembly French Union where he was division head from 1952 to 1958. He began writing, while traveling extensively, notably in Africa. He became secretary in 1960 debates in the Senate until 1980. He was journalist and novelist, he began his career as a scriptwriter in 1967.

His first published novel will be Les Grandes Lessives in 1953, followed by Chemins écartés. He is then hired by Pierre Lazareff to France-Soir as a journalist. This experience led to L'État sauvage, which earned him the Prix Goncourt in 1964.

Before the Goncourt, he had received the Fénéon in 1956, then the Booksellers prize in 1960 for La Corrida de la victoire.

As a screenwriter, his record is brilliant, including L'Horizon (directed by Jacques Rouffio 1967), Sept Morts sur ordonnance (J. Rouffio 1976), La Victoire en chantant (Jean-Jacques Annaud 1976), Judith Therpauve (Patrice Chéreau, 1978), La Banquière (Francis Girod 1980). It also works in television, directing A2 on a collection of films and with the launch of the series Châteauvallon. Some of his books were made into movies, including The Savage State and Le sucre by Jacques Rouffio.

His last film collaboration scenario has been devoted to the history of the famous assassin of the nineteenth century, Lacenaire. Directed by Francis Girod, the film was released in theaters in 1990.

He was Chevalier de la Legion of Honour and an Officer of the Order of Merit and Arts and Letters, and was politically active at PSU and then the Socialist Party.

== Works ==
- 1953: Les Grandes Lessives, Albin Michel
- 1954: Les Chemins écartés, Albin Michel
- 1955: L'Horizon. Les honneurs de la guerre, Albin Michel. (awarded Prix Fénéon)
- 1957: Tous comptes faits, Albin Michel
- 1959: La Corrida de la victoire, Albin Michel. Prix des Libraires
- 1961: L'Esbrouffe, Albin Michel. Prix des Volcans
- 1964: L'État sauvage, Albin Michel. Prix Goncourt
- 1967: Le Canada, Arthaud. Prix Montcalm
- 1967: L'Apprenti gaucher, Albin Michel
- 1967: L'Auvergne, Arthaud
- 1969: Nous la Gauche devant Louis-Napoléon, Flammarion
- 1972: L'Amour en face, Albin Michel
- 1975: Sept Morts sur ordonnance, Presses de la Cité
- 1977: Le Sucre, Albin Michel
- 1978: Judith Therpauve, Jean-Claude Simoën
- 1980: La Banquière, Ramsay
- 1983: Le Bel Avenir, Albin Michel
- 1986: Mon beau-frère a tué ma sœur, Albin Michel
- 1987: Colette Stern, Gallimard
- 1990: Lacenaire, Edition du Seuil
- 1965: Pourquoi pas Vamos de Georges Conchon, mise en scène Jean Mercure, Théâtre Edouard VII

=== Screenplays ===
- 1967: The Stranger by Luchino Visconti
- 1975: Il pleut sur Santiago by Helvio Soto
- 1975: 7 morts sur ordonnance by Jacques Rouffio
- 1976: Black and White in Color by Jean-Jacques Annaud
- 1977: L'État sauvage by Francis Girod
- 1978: Judith Therpauve by Patrice Chéreau
- 1978: Le Sucre by Jacques Rouffio
- 1980: La Banquière by Francis Girod
- 1980: Une affaire d'hommes by Nicolas Ribowski
- 1985: Châteauvallon' (TV series)
- 1986: Mon beau-frère a tué ma sœur by Jacques Rouffio
- 1990: Lacenaire by Francis Girod
- 1994: Radetzkymarsch (TV series) by Axel Corti

=== Author ===
- 1966: L'Horizon by Jacques Rouffio
- 1977: L'État sauvage by Francis Girod
- 1978: Le Sucre by Jacques Rouffio

=== Dialogue ===
- 1966: L'Horizon by Jacques Rouffio
- 1986: Mon beau-frère a tué ma sœur by Jacques Rouffio

=== Actor ===
- 1976: René la Canne by Francis Girod
