= Dossier 51 =

- Directed by: Michel Deville
- Written by: Michel Deville; Gilles Perrault
- Produced by: Philippe Dussart
- Starring: Françoise Béliard
- Cinematography: Claude Lecomte
- Edited by: Raymonde Guyot
- Music by: Jean Schwarz
- Distributed by: Gaumont Distribution
- Release date: 30 August 1978
- Running time: 108 minutes
- Country: France
- Language: French
- Box office: $2 million

Dossier 51 (French: Le Dossier 51) is a 1978 French crime drama film directed by Michel Deville and based on a novel by Gilles Perrault. Deville and Perrault won a César Award for Best Screenplay, Dialogue or Adaptation for their adaptation. The film was screened in the Un Certain Regard section at the 1978 Cannes Film Festival.

== Plot ==
An elaborate surveillance operation is mounted by a French intelligence agency on a French diplomat, codenamed 51. While his professional life is not suspect, clandestine investigations into his private life reveal an increasing number of vulnerabilities.

Only surviving child of his adoring mother, she reveals that he was hated by her husband, who had betrayed his biological father to the Gestapo. At his Catholic school, the priests recall his propensity for fantasy about other boys. Military service kept him in an all-male environment and former comrades remember his construction of alternative realities about them. After a student affair with an anarchist of boyish appearance, he hastily married a girl of good family, who gave him two children but sleeps with other men.

When an agent wins his confidence and starts revealing knowledge of his past, he kills himself by driving into a tree. The operation is wound up.

== Cast ==
- Françoise Béliard - Sylvie Mouriat
- Patrick Chesnais - Hadès
- Jenny Clève - Agent 747
- Jean Dautremay - Esculape 3
- Gérard Dessalles - Brauchite
- Jean-Michel Dupuis - Agent Hécate 8446
- Sabine Glaser - Paméla
- Nathalie Juvet - Marguerite Marie
- Françoise Lugagne - Madame Auphal
- Christophe Malavoy - Agent 8956
- Claude Marcault - Liliane Auphal / 52
- François Marthouret - Dominique Auphal / 51
- Jean Martin - Vénus
- Claire Nadeau - The 9000 Friend
- Michel Aumont - Mars's voice
