= 7 morts sur ordonnance =

- Directed by: Jacques Rouffio
- Screenplay by: Georges Conchon; Jacques Rouffio; Jean-Louis Chevrier
- Story by: Georges Conchon
- Produced by: Jacques Dorfmann; Francis Girod
- Starring: Michel Piccoli; Gérard Depardieu; Jane Birkin; Marina Vlady; Charles Vanel
- Cinematography: Andréas Winding
- Edited by: Geneviève Winding
- Music by: Philippe Sarde
- Production companies: Belstar Productions; Films 66; TIT Filmproduktion; Jet Films
- Distributed by: AMLF
- Release dates: December 3, 1975 (France); June 4, 1976 (Germany); June 12, 1978 (Spain)
- Running time: 108 minutes
- Countries: France; West Germany; Spain
- Language: French

7 morts sur ordonnance (lit. '7 Deaths by Prescription') is a 1975 film directed by Jacques Rouffio. It stars Michel Piccoli, Gérard Depardieu, Jane Birkin, Marina Vlady, and Charles Vanel.

The film was awarded the César Award for Best Editing, and was nominated for Best Film, Best Actor and Best Screenplay, Dialogue or Adaptation.

== Plot ==
Pierre Losseray is a surgeon at the public hospital in a small provincial town in France (Clermont-Ferrand). He has recently suffered a heart attack but has returned to work. He is appreciated by his patients, and is being harassed by Old Brézé, the owner of a nearby medical clinic, who is losing clients and cannot stand competition. In league with his sons and son-in-law, Brézé uses insinuations close to blackmail. Losseray also learns about the story of Doctor Jean-Pierre Berg, another surgeon with a very different lifestyle from Losseray, who was similarly hassled by the same man fifteen years before. He becomes obsessed with it as he discovers what it was about.

Berg had killed his three children, his wife and finally himself, apparently when under such pressure; however, the real reason of why he did that remains unclear: he had much charisma, a Boston University diploma, an excellent reputation, a charming wife, and was even about to launch his own private clinic. Losseray, though being constantly bugged by Brézé, gets information – sometimes contradictory – by bits and pieces, becomes more and more obsessed with it and the Brézé clan, and finally understands what really happened. He eventually shares the same fate as Berg. Seemingly without concern, the Brézé clan continue with their nefarious activities.

A major role is held by Mathy, a psychiatrist who happens to know, because of his social relations, all the clues about the former story, but gives them reluctantly because he wants to be in good terms with everybody.

== Cast ==
- Michel Piccoli as Dr. Pierre Losseray
- Gérard Depardieu as Dr. Jean-Pierre Berg
- Jane Birkin as Jane Berg
- Marina Vlady as Muriel Losseray
- Charles Vanel as Old Brézé
- Michel Auclair as Dr. Mathy
- Monique Mélinand as Mrs. Giret
- Coline Serreau as Mrs. Mauvagne
- Antonio Ferrandis as Commissaire Giret
- Georg Marischka as Paul Brézé
- José María Prada as Simon Mauvagne
- Karl Schönböck as Joseph Brézé

== Production ==
Following his debut in film with L'Horizon (1967), director Jacques Rouffio had several years without film work due to controversy surrounding the film.His second film, 7 morts sur ordonnance was inspired by the suicide of a surgeon in Reims in 1969. The screenwriter Georges Conchon spent time in Reims gathering information on it, which lead to characters in the film such as Professor Brézé being modeled on the surgeon Joseph Bouvier.

Michel Piccoli was cast in the film, and also co-produced it with his company Films 66 who had also produced L'Horizon previously. The film had 6.5 million francs budget and was predominantly a French production, split 60/20/20 between the French companies Belstar Productions and Films 66, with the latter being the Munich-based TIT Filmproduktion and Jet Films from Barcelona.

== Release ==
7 Morts sur ordonnance was released in France on December 3, 1975. Roberto Curti and Frank Lafond, the authors of French Thrillers of the 1970s: Volume I, Crime Films (2026) said the film was a "good commercial success" in France with over 1,151,000 spectators.

It was released in Germany as Quartett Bestial on June 4, 1976, and in Spain on June 12, 1978, as Siete muertes por prescripción.
