= Jacques Rouffio =

French film director

- Born: 14 August 1928; Marseille, France
- Died: 8 July 2016 (aged 87); Paris, France
- Occupations: Film director Screenwriter
- Years active: 1967 - 1995

Jacques Rouffio (14 August 1928 – 8 July 2016) was a French film director and screenwriter. His 1986 film My Brother-in-law Killed My Sister was entered into the 36th Berlin International Film Festival.

== Filmography as director ==
- L'Horizon (Horizon) (1967)
- 7 morts sur ordonnance (lit. '7 Deaths by Prescription') (1975)
- Violette et François (1977)
- Le Sucre (Sugar) (1978)
- La Passante du Sans-Souci (The Passerby) (1982)
- Mon beau-frère a tué ma soeur (My Brother-in-Law Killed My Sister) (1986)
- L'État de grâce (State of Grace) (1986)
- L'Argent (1988) (TV)
- L'Orchestre rouge (The Red Orchestra) (1989)
- Le Stagiaire (1991) (TV)
- V'la l'cinéma ou le roman de Charles Pathé (The Life of Charles Pathé) (1995) (TV)
