= List of Belgian films of the 1960s =

A list of films produced in Belgium ordered by year of release. For an alphabetical list of Belgian films see Category:Belgian films

Title	Director	Cast	Genre	Notes
1960
If the Wind Frightens You	Emile Degelin			Entered into the 1960 Cannes Film Festival
1961
A Train Leaves in Every Hour	André Cavens			Entered into the 12th Berlin International Film Festival
1962
1963
Life and Death in Flanders	Emile Degelin			Entered into the 13th Berlin International Film Festival
1964
1965
Pinocchio in Outer Space	Ray Goossens		Animation	Belgian-American co-production
Les aventures des Schtroumpfs (The Adventures of the Smurfs)	Eddy Ryssack, Maurice Rossy		Animation	Compilation of five black-and-white shorts made for television
1966
1967
Astérix le Gaulois (Asterix The Gaul)	Ray Goossens		Animation	French-Belgian co-production
The Death of a Double	Rolf Thiele	Jürgen Draeger, Werner Pochath, Ivan Desny	Crime	Co-production with West Germany
The Departure	Jerzy Skolimowski			Won the Golden Bear at Berlin
Thursday We Shall Sing Like Sunday	Luc de Heusch			Entered into the 5th Moscow International Film Festival
1968
Astérix et Cléopâtre (Asterix and Cleopatra)	René Goscinny, Lee Payant, Albert Uderzo		Animation	French-Belgian co-production
1969
Klann – grand guignol	Patrick Ledoux			Entered into the 20th Berlin International Film Festival
Monsieur Hawarden	Harry Kümel	Ellen Vogel	Drama	
Palaver (film)	Emile Degelin			Entered into the 6th Moscow International Film Festival
Tintin et le temple du soleil (Tintin and the Temple of the Sun)	Eddie Lateste		Animation	
