= Macunaíma =

Macunaíma may also refer to:

- Macunaíma (novel)
- Macunaíma (film)
- Cocktails with cachaça#Macunaíma, a cocktail
- Makunaima, a genus of characin fish from South America
