= Muiraquitã =

Artefact of Amazonian Indigenous origin

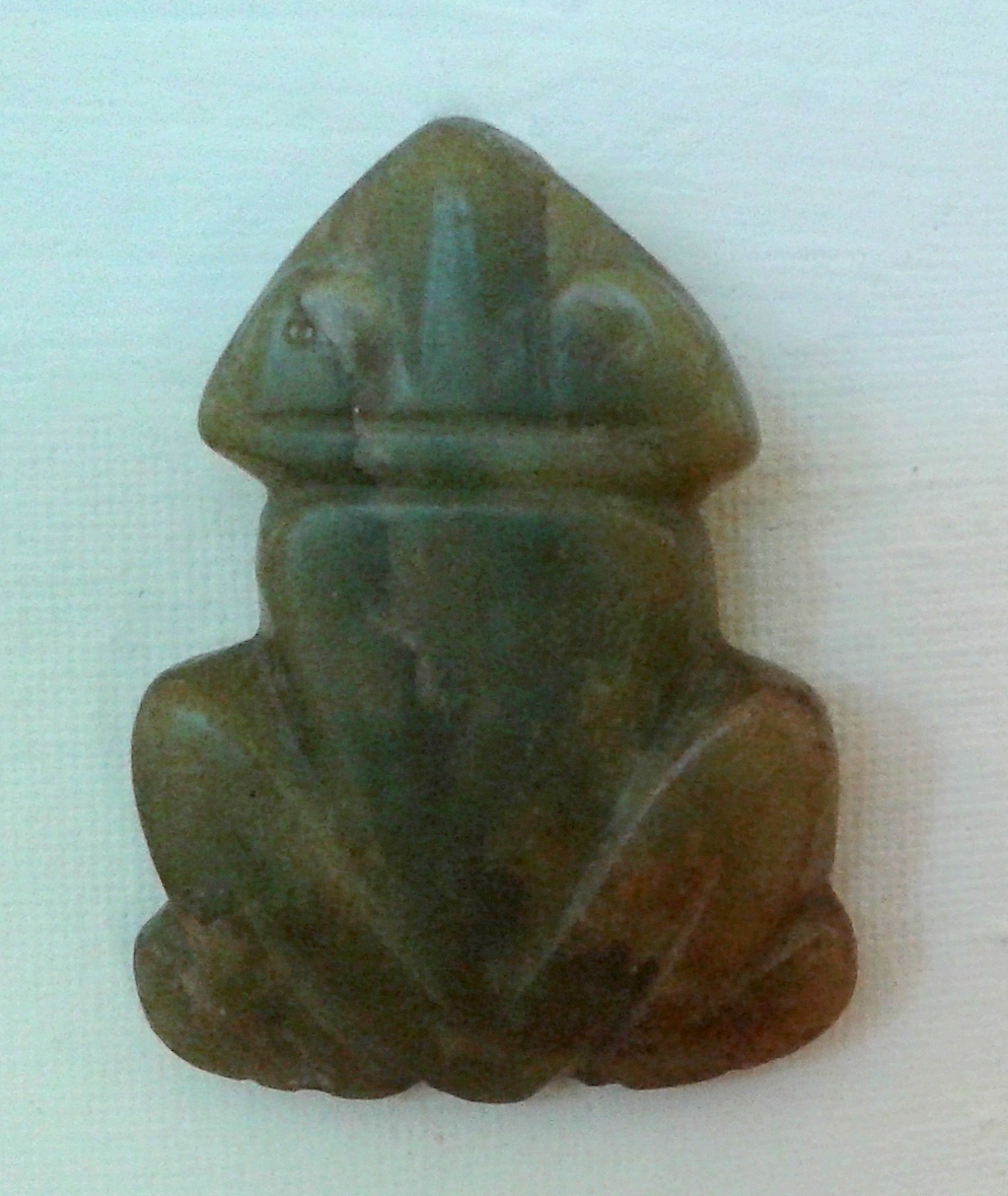
Frog-shaped Muiraquitã. Collection of the National Museum of Brazil, Rio de Janeiro.

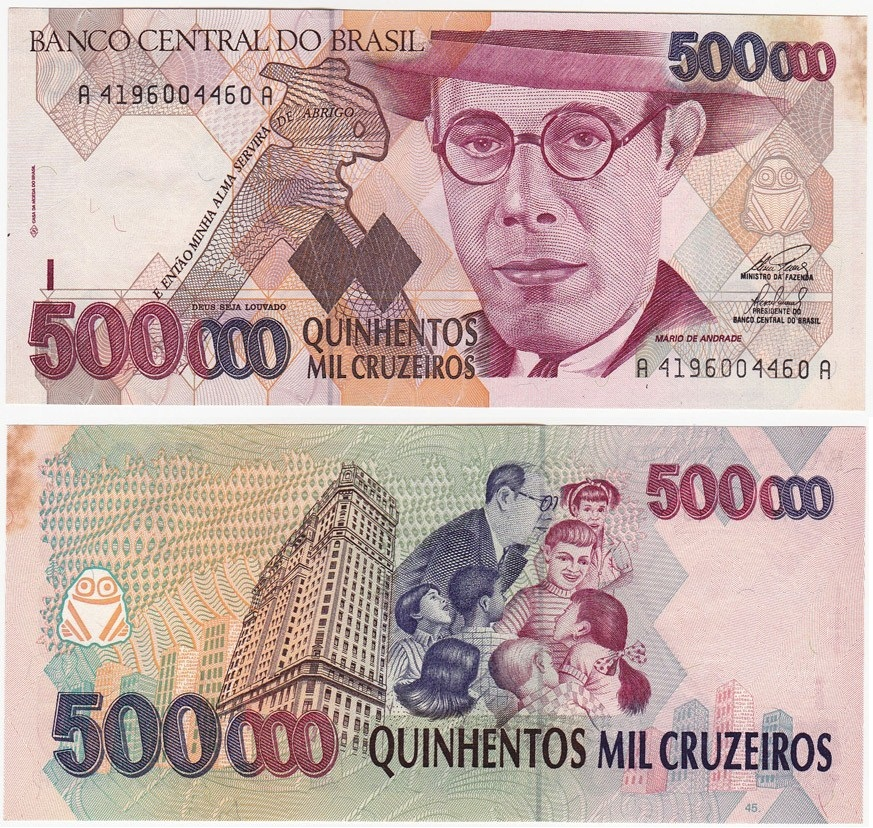
Muiraquitã right to Andrade on the banknote of 500,000 Brazilian cruzeiros

Muiraquitã (Brazilian Portuguese: /mujɾakiˈtɐ̃/, from Tupi mbïraki'tã, "knot of trees", from muyrá / mbyra, "tree", "stick", "wood" and quit, "knot", "wart", "rounded object") is the name given to various types of old artefacts of Amazonian Indigenous origin, carved in stone (primarily jade, nephrite) or wood, and representing animals (especially frogs, but also others such as fish and turtles) or people. Muiraquitãs are often used as pendants, amulets, and in other decorative capacities.

In Brazilian folklore, there are a number of legends associated with the muiraquitã, to which supernatural qualities are often attributed.

== Historical information ==
The Muiraquitã, a carved green frog-shaped stone, was used as an amulet by the Tapajós women to prevent disease and avoid infertility. Their popularity spread around the Lower Amazon Basin and through to the Caribbean, where Muiraquitãs from the Amazon state in Brazil were found. "They must have been an object of exchange among elites," says archaeologist Marcondes Lima da Costa, Federal University of Pará. Fashion reached Europe in the eighteenth century when these amulets were taken to the Old Continent. It was believed that they prevented epilepsy and kidney stones. Today they are rare pieces that reach high prices at auctions.

== Legend ==
The legend says that the amulet was offered as a gift by the icamiaba female warriors to all those Indians who annually visited their camp at the river Nhamundá. Once a year, during a ceremony dedicated to the moon, the Icamiabas received the Guacaris warriors with whom they mated. At midnight, they dived into the river and brought up a greenish clay in their hands, which they molded into various forms: frogs, turtles or other animals, and presented these to their loved ones. Some versions say that this ritual would take place in an enchanted lake named Jaci uaruá ("mirror moon" in Old Tupi: îasy arugûá).

Retrieved from the bottom of the river and shaped by the women, the still soft clay hardened in contact with the elements. These objects were then strung on the strands of hair of their brides and used as amulets by their male warriors. To date, this amulet is considered a sacred object, believed to bring happiness and luck and also to cure almost all diseases. It is also found in Macunaíma, a well-known and internationally renowned literary work by Mário de Andrade.

== Literature and arts ==
=== Macunaíma ===
Mário de Andrade (1893–1945) a writer, poet, and musician, born in Brazil, is considered one of the most influential figures in Brazilian literature and culture. A leading member of the Modernist movement in Brazil during the 1920s and 1930s, de Andrade's impressive work was distinguished by its engagement with Brazilian folklore and culture. He worked “to define a vision to which artists could adhere, through generations and ensuing trends, and claimed that actualizing postwar European models of constructive modernist tendencies could make possible a similar renovation of Brazilian culture.” He aimed to emphasize Brazilian native culture in modern Brazil while moving away from the Eurocentric narratives that dominated Brazilian culture.

One of de Andrade's most famous modernist works is his novel Macunaíma: The Hero with No Character. The story is considered a fictional masterpiece that “opened up new themes, a new Brazilian language for fiction.” Macunaíma, tells the story of a young man named Macunaíma, who was born in the Brazilian jungle, as he embarks on a series of adventures where he encounters strange characters along the way. On one of his adventures, Macunaíma loses his Muiraquitã, which signified the only link left between Macunaíma and his wife Ci, who gave him the amulet before departing to the skies after the death of their son. There is a legend that says that Amazonian warrior women couldn’t have long-lasting relationships with men, therefore gifting the Muiraquitã to a man represented a symbolic alliance between the man and the woman. Ci, an Amazonian warrior woman, giving the Muiraquitã to Macunaíma, who is “the hero of our people”, in the story came to “represent a union between Brazilian people and tropical nature.” The union between Ci and Macunaíma becomes the “high point of the hero’s happiness and tranquility” which is why the Muiraquitã holds significant value for Macunaíma. The loss of the Muiraquitã prompts Macunaíma on a journey to search for the amulet, becoming a driving force in the story.

== See also ==
- Brazilian mythology
- Indigenous peoples in Brazil

== Additional information ==
=== Sources ===
- Marcondes Lima da Costa; et al. (2002). "Muyrakytã ou Muiraquitã, um Talismã Arqueológico em Jade Procedente da Amazônia: Uma Revisão Histórica e Considerações Antropogeológicas" [Muyrakytã or Muiraquitã, an Archaeological Jade Talisman Coming from Amazonia: Historical Review and Anthropogeological Implications] (PDF). Acta Amazonica (in Portuguese). 32 (3): 467–490. doi:10.1590/1809-43922002323490.
