= Gabriel Cattand =

French actor (1923–1997)

- Born: 29 November 1923; Bonneville, Haute-Savoie, France
- Died: 9 August 1997 (aged 73); Yvelines, France
- Occupation: Actor
- Years active: 1950–1997

Gabriel Cattand (29 November 1923 – 9 August 1997) was a French actor. He appeared in 108 films and television shows between 1950 and 1997. He starred in the 1969 film Klann – grand guignol, which was entered into the 20th Berlin International Film Festival.

== Partial filmography ==
- The Bread Peddler (1950) – Georges Darier aka Georges Fortier
- Pigalle-Saint-Germain-des-Prés (1950) – Le poète Jean-Pierre Francis
- Women's Prison (1958) – L'avocat
- Cause toujours, mon lapin (1961)
- Laissez tirer les tireurs (1964) – Le colonel (uncredited)
- 3 Avengers (1964) – (French version, voice)
- Maroc 7 (1967) – Bit Part (uncredited)
- Réseau secret (1967) – Von Braun
- Klann – grand guignol (1969) – Klann
- Céleste (1970) – Me Moret
- Repeated Absences (1972) – Le flic
- The Hunted (1972) – Harry
- Shock Treatment (1973) – Procureur de Boissière
- The Hostage Gang (1973) – Charles Aubrey
- Rude journée pour la reine (1973) – Monsieur Flatters
- Stavisky (1974) – Un député à la commission d'enquête
- The Story of O (1975) – The commander
- Lovers Like Us (1975)
- La situation est grave... mais pas désespérée (1976) – Philippe de Valrude
- Blue jeans (1977) – Mr. Lawn
- Servant and Mistress (1977) – Charles
- Armaguedon (1977) – Jimmy Laurent – L'animateur de 'Welcome la vie'
- Fire's Share (1978) – William de Wallier, le banquier
- Cause toujours... tu m'intéresses! (1979) – Le chirurgien
- La gueule de l'autre (1979) – (uncredited)
- I... comme Icare (1979) – Le président Marc Jarry
- Jupiter's Thigh (1980) – Le maire
- Julien Fontanes, magistrat (1981, TV Series) – René de Senover, le libraire
- Les Maîtres du temps (1982) – Pirate (voice)
- Le démon dans l'île (1983) – Henry Garland – le pharmacien
- Le Marginal (1983) – Contrôleur Dumas
- Paris minuit (1986) – Commissaire Belland
- Les oreilles entre les dents (1987) – Théron
- Life and Nothing But (1989) – Professeur Mortier
- Le secret de Sarah Tombelaine (1991) – Bourjois
- The Accompanist (1992) – Parisian Impresario
