= Paulicéia Desvairada =

1922 poetry collection by Mário de Andrade

Emiliano Di Cavalcanti's cover for Paulicéia Desvairada.

Paulicéia Desvairada (from the Portuguese, literally "Frantic São Paulo", often translated as "Hallucinated City") is a collection of poems by Mário de Andrade, published in 1922. It was Andrade's second poetry collection, and his most controversial and influential. Andrade's free use of meter introduced revolutionary European modernist ideas into Brazilian poetry, which was previously strictly formal.

== Composition ==
"Paulicéia" is a nickname for São Paulo, the city of Andrade's birth and the city in which the book was published. Within individual poems in the collection, Andrade occasionally refers to the city as "Paulicéia." Jack E. Tomlins's translation, the only one in English, is titled Hallucinated City. The collection takes place in São Paulo and is tied to the city in myriad ways, both artistically and historically. It grew directly out of Andrade's experiences at the center of the São Paulo arts scene in the year leading up to 1922, the watershed year of the Brazilian Modernist movement of which Andrade was the chief literary figure. In the mythology of the book Andrade himself created, it grew out of a transcendently alienating experience Andrade had in 1920: his family's anger over his purchase of a (in their view) blasphemous sculpture by Victor Brecheret. There is no doubt that Brecheret and the other young artists and writers in Andrade's circle—chiefly Oswald de Andrade, Anita Malfatti, Emiliano Di Cavalcanti and Menotti del Picchia—influenced the development of the book. It was written, much like the parallel modernist masterpiece The Waste Land, backwards: Andrade explains in the preface that he began with a very long, hastily written, and rather unstructured work which was then gradually whittled down into its final state.

== Structure and approach ==
The book consists of 22 short poems, each a single image of a segment of São Paulo life, followed by a long poem "As Enfibraturas do Ipiranga" ("The Moral Fibrature of the Ipiranga"), described as "A Profane Oratorio" and complete with specific but impossible stage directions: "All of the 550,000 singers quickly clear their throats and take exaggeratedly deep breaths" (81). Andrade read several of these poems during the Week of Modern Art (Semana de Arte Moderna) in February, 1922, which he organized in collaboration with Di Cavalcanti, Malfatti, and several others. He also read an essay, written after the poems were completed, describing their theoretical basis in retrospect; this essay was published as an introduction to the collection, with the tongue-in-cheek title "Extremely Interesting Preface." The tone is irreverent and combative and the essay outlines a freely musical use of verse.

The poems, which present neither regular meter nor rhyme and which are primarily not written in complete sentences but rather in short, rhythmic phrases, were greeted with catcalls at the initial reading, though many in the audience still recognized their significance. In form they are utterly new; in theme they may be euphoric or strikingly plaintive, concerned with the least glamorous corners of the city, in a way that was quite new to Brazilian poetry. "Tristura" ("Sadness") begins:

| Profundo. Imundo meu coração . . . Olha o edifício: Matadouros da Continental. Os vícios viciaram-me na bajulação sem sacrifícios . . . Minha alma corcunda como a avenida São João . . . | Deep down. Filthy my heart . . . Look at the building: Continental Slaughterhouses. Vices have corrupted me in false adulation without sacrifices . . . My soul hunchbacked like the Avenue St. John . . |

== Dedication ==
Published later in the same year as the Week of Modern Art, the book's militant sense of artistic innovation is foregrounded, from start to finish. The dedication is to Mário de Andrade himself, and begins:

Beloved Master,
In the many brief hours which you made me spend at your side, you often spoke of your faith in free and sincere art; and I received the courage of my Truth and pride in my Ideal not from myself but from your experience. Allow me now to offer you this book which came to me from you. Please God, may you never be vexed by the brutal doubt of Adrien Sixte . . .

Responding to the traditional poetic appeal to the classical muses and to God, Andrade places both within himself, and asks himself not to suffer the doubt of Adrien Sixte, a character in a novel by Paul Bourget, Le Disciple, who, as a professor of philosophy, argues calmly and rationally for positivism and naturalism without admitting the stark pessimism of those ideas into his own untroubled life, until a student, taking them perhaps more seriously than he does, acts on them severely, and someone dies. For Andrade, being Mário de Andrade meant never quailing from the severity of his convictions.
