= 1960 Cannes Film Festival =

- Official poster of the 13th Cannes Film Festival, an original illustration by Jean-Denis Maillart.
- Opening film: Ben-Hur
- Location: Cannes, France
- Founded: 1946
- Awards: Palme d'Or: La Dolce Vita
- No. of films: 29 (In Competition)
- Festival date: 4 May 1960 – 20 May 1960
- Website: festival-cannes.com/en

Cannes Film Festival
- 1961 1959

The 13th Cannes Film Festival took place from 4 to 20 May 1960. Belgian writer Georges Simenon served as Jury President for the main competition. The Palme d'Or, the festival's top prize, was awarded to La Dolce Vita by Federico Fellini.

The festival opened with Ben-Hur by William Wyler.

== Juries ==
=== Main Competition ===
- Georges Simenon, Belgian writer Jury President
- Marc Allégret, French filmmaker
- Louis Chauvet, French writer and journalist
- Diego Fabbri, Italian writer
- Hidemi Ima, Japanese writer and critic
- Grigori Kozintsev, Soviet filmmaker
- Maurice Le Roux, French composer
- Max Lippmann, West-German critic
- Henry Miller, American writer
- Ulyses Petit de Murat, Argentine writer
- Simone Renant, French actress

=== Short Films Competition ===
- Georges Altman, French journalist
- Nicolas Hayer, French cinematographer
- Henri Storck, Belgian filmmaker
- Jean Vivie, French CST official
- Dušan Vukotić, Yugoslavian filmmaker

== Official Selection ==
=== In Competition ===
The following feature films competed for the Palme d'Or:

English title	Original title	Director(s)	Production country
America as Seen by a Frenchman	L'Amérique insolite	François Reichenbach	France
L'Avventura		Michelangelo Antonioni	Italy, France
Bad Luck	Zezowate szczęście	Andrzej Munk	Poland
Ballad of a Soldier	Баллада о солдате	Grigory Chukhray	Soviet Union
The Chasers	Jakten	Erik Løchen	Norway
Cidade Ameaçada		Roberto Farias	Brazil
The Delinquents	Los golfos	Carlos Saura	Spain
La Dolce Vita		Federico Fellini	Italy, France
The Enchanting Shadow	倩女幽魂	Li Han-hsiang	Hong Kong
First Lesson	Първи урок	Rangel Valchanov	Bulgaria
The Hole	Le Trou	Jacques Becker	France
Home from the Hill		Vincente Minnelli	United States
If the Wind Frightens You	Si le vent te fait peur	Emile Degelin	Belgium
The Lady with the Dog	Дама с собачкой	Iosif Kheifits	Soviet Union
Letter Never Sent	Неотправленное письмо	Mikhail Kalatozov	Soviet Union
Macario		Roberto Gavaldón	Mexico
Never on Sunday	Ποτέ την Κυριακή	Jules Dassin	Greece
The Ninth Circle	Девети круг	France Štiglic	Yugoslavia
Odd Obsession	鍵	Kon Ichikawa	Japan
Paw	Boy of Two Worlds	Astrid Henning-Jensen	Denmark
La Procesión		Francis Lauric	Argentina
The Savage Innocents		Nicholas Ray	Italy, United Kingdom, France
Seven Days... Seven Nights	Moderato Cantabile	Peter Brook	France
Sons and Lovers		Jack Cardiff	United Kingdom
Sujata		Bimal Roy	India
Telegrame		Gheorghe Naghi and Aurel Miheles	Romania
The Virgin Spring	Jungfrukällan	Ingmar Bergman	Sweden
When the Woman Butts In	Kam čert nemůže	Zdeněk Podskalský	Czechoslovakia
The Young One	La joven	Luis Buñuel	Mexico

=== Out of Competition ===
The following films were selected to be screened out of competition:

- Ben-Hur by William Wyler (opening film)
- Orient-Occident by Enrico Fulchignoni

=== Short Films Competition ===
The following short films competed for the Short Film Palme d'Or:

- Aux confins des deux continents by Emlak Kredi Bankasi
- La ballata del Monte Bianco by Luciano Ricci
- The Blue of the Sky by John Ralmon
- Le brise glace atomique Lenine by Nicholas Tcherskov
- A City Called Copenhagen by Jørgen Roos
- Dagen mijner jaren by Max De Haas
- De Dragul Printesei by Ion Popescu-Gopo
- Enfants des courants d'air by Edouard Luntz
- Fiesta en Xochimilco by Fernando Martinez Alvarez
- Fitz-Roy by Humberto Peruzzi
- Franz Hellens ou documents secrets by Lucien Deroisy
- In Search of Lincoln by Carlisle, Dunphy, Wondsel
- Le journal d'un certain David by Pierre Jallaud, Sylvie Jallaud
- Mali voz by Branislas Bastac
- Materia e forma by Fulvio Tului
- Orff-Schulwerk - Rhythmisch-Melodische Erziehung by Hans Rolf Strobel, Heinz Tichawsky
- Paris la belle by Pierre Prévert
- Perfecto luna by Archibaldo Burns
- Le pilote m'a dit by Niklaus Gessner
- Pozor by Jiří Brdečka
- Promethee by Todor Dinov
- Die Purpulinie by K.L. Ruppel
- Ragadozo novenyek by Ágoston Kollányi
- Roman mosaics in Anatolia by M.S. Ipsiroglu
- Shringar by RavI Prakash
- Sorolla, pintor de la luz by Manuel Dominguez
- Le sourire by Serge Bourguignon
- Universe by Roman Kroitor
- Uwaga diabeł by Zenon Wasilewski
- Les Alpinistes de la Mer (De Wadlopers) by Emile Van Moerkerken
- Winter Quarters by John P. Taylor

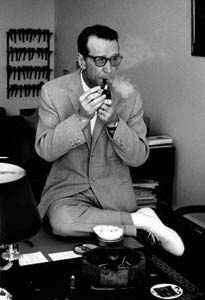
Georges Simenon, Jury President

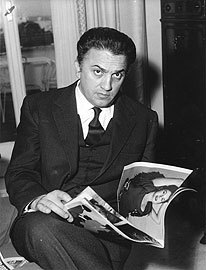
Federico Fellini, Palme d'Or winner

== Official Awards ==
=== Main Competition ===
- Palme d'Or: La Dolce Vita by Federico Fellini
- Jury Prize:
  - L'Avventura by Michelangelo Antonioni
  - Odd Obsession by Kon Ichikawa
- Best Actress:
  - Jeanne Moreau for Seven Days... Seven Nights
  - Melina Mercouri for Never on Sunday
- Best participation:
  - The Lady with the Dog by Iosif Kheifits
  - Ballad of a Soldier by Grigory Chukhray
- Special Mention:
  - The Virgin Spring by Ingmar Bergman
  - The Young One by Luis Buñuel

=== Short Films Competition ===
- Short Film Palme d'Or: Le sourire by Serge Bourguignon
- Short Film Jury Prize:
  - Paris la belle by Pierre Prévert
  - A City Called Copenhagen by Jørgen Roos
  - Universe by Roman Kroitor
- Special Mention: Dagen mijner jaren by Max De Haas

== Independent Awards ==
=== FIPRESCI Prize ===
- The Virgin Spring by Ingmar Bergman

=== OCIC Award ===
- Paw by Astrid Henning-Jensen

== Media ==
- British Pathé: Cannes Film Festival 1960 footage
- Institut National de l'Audiovisuel: Cannes Festival (commentary in French)
- INA: Dolce Vita night at the 1960 Festival (commentary in French)
- INA: List of winners of the 1960 Cannes Festival (commentary in French)
- INA: Opening of the Cannes Film Festival (commentary in French)
