= Bobo Lewis =

American actress (1926–1998)

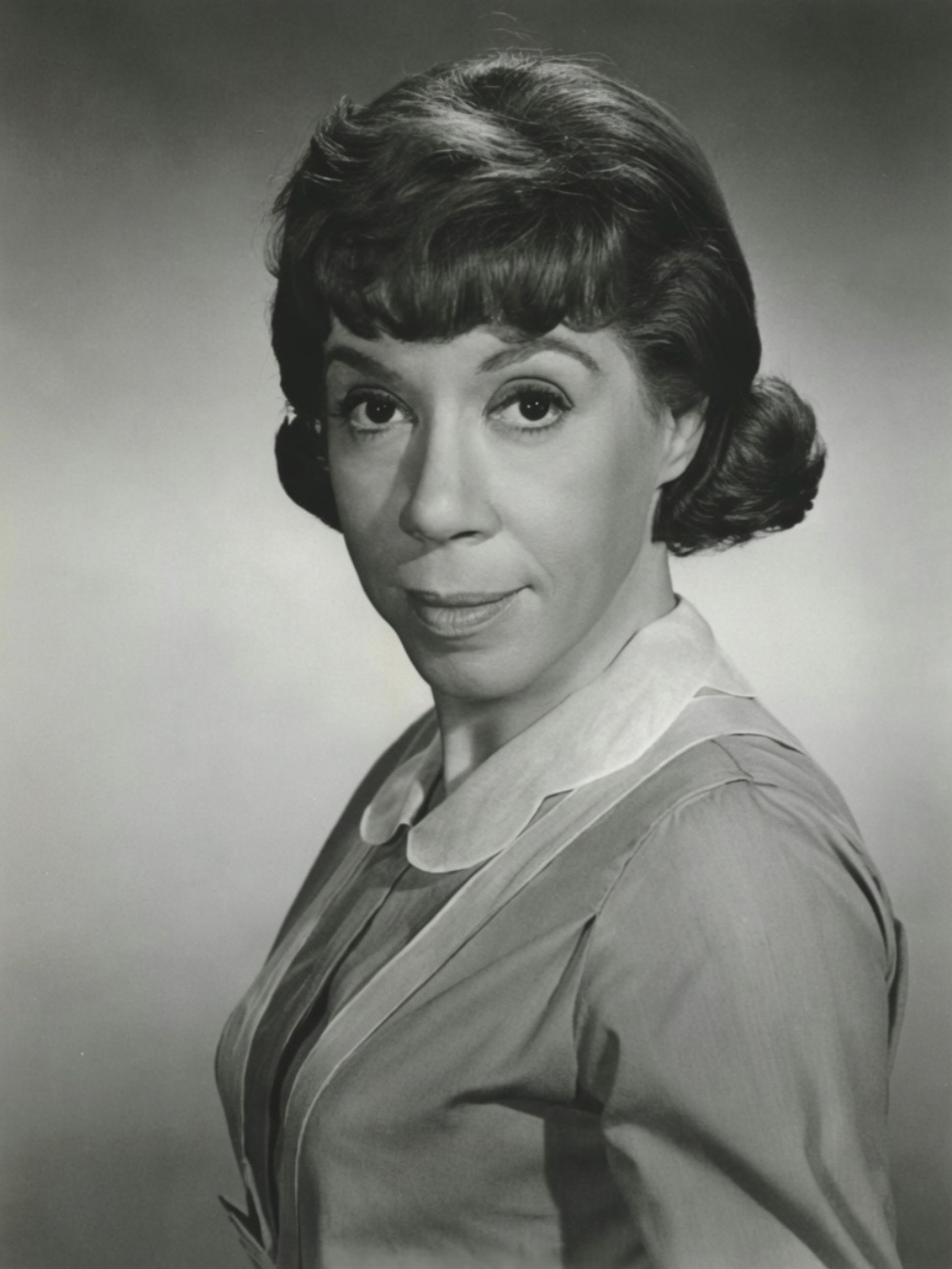
- Lewis in Karen, 1964
- Born: Barbara Lewis; May 14, 1926; Miami, Florida, U.S.
- Died: November 6, 1998 (aged 72); New York City, U.S.
- Occupation: Actress
- Years active: 1962–1998

Barbara "Bobo" Lewis (May 14, 1926 – November 6, 1998) was an American comedic actress of film, musical theatre, stage and television.

Born in Miami, Florida, Lewis studied acting and won a Drama Desk Award in 1978 for portraying a teacher in Working on Broadway. In 1997, she was nominated for a Joseph Jefferson Award.

== Career ==
Lewis appeared in numerous stage productions throughout her career. In 1965, Lewis was part of the cast of the Off-Broadway musical revue The Decline and Fall of the Entire World as Seen Through the Eyes of Cole Porter by Ben Bagley. She performed as Emily, Celia, Dorothy, and Ma as a standby in Twigs (1971 to 1972), followed by roles as the Dowager and Olga in The Women (1973). In 1974, she served as a replacement for the role of Mrs. Ella Spofford in Lorelei. She won the Drama Desk Award for her performances as Fran Swenson, Grace Clements, Lucille Page, and Rose Hoffman in Working (1978). Lewis later appeared in the 1980 world premiere of The Diviners as Norma Henshaw, also as a replacement. In 1987, she portrayed Bernice Roth in The Musical Comedy Murders of 1940 of 1940 before joining the Broadway production of 42nd Street as a replacement for the role of Maggie Jones.

Bobo Lewis was most famous for her role as gossip Midge Smoot on the children's television series Shining Time Station. Lewis would later appear in the four succeeding Shining Time Specials in 1995. Her other television appearances include roles on sitcoms such as Bewitched, The Monkees, That Girl, and Gomer Pyle, U.S.M.C..

Bobo was seen in a handful of well-known films such as It's a Mad, Mad, Mad, Mad World (1963), Under the Yum Yum Tree (1963), Way...Way Out (1966) Can't Stop the Music (1980), Arthur (1981) Her Alibi (1989), Miami Blues (1990) and The Paper (1994).

== Death ==
Lewis died on November 6, 1998, at New York Hospital in Manhattan from cancer, aged 72.

== Legacy ==
She teamed up with her Broadway co-star Lynne Thigpen (Working, 1978) to create the Lynne Thigpen-Bobo Lewis Foundation "to help young actresses and actors learn how to survive and succeed in New York theater".

== Filmography ==
Year	Title	Role	Notes
1962	The Interns	Gwen	
1963	Under the Yum Yum Tree	Claudia Hoffer	
1963	It's a Mad, Mad, Mad, Mad World	Pilot's Wife	Uncredited
1964	Kiss Me, Stupid	Waitress	
1966	Way... Way Out	Esther Davenport	
1970	Which Way to the Front?	Camille Bland	
1975	The Wild Party	Wilma	
1975	Lovers Like Us	Miss Mark	
1980	Can't Stop the Music	Breadwoman	
1981	The Nesting	Catherine Beasley	
1981	Arthur	Lady in Coffee Shop	
1982	Blood Bride	Mama	
1987	The Adventure of the Action Hunters		
1988	Running on Empty	Home Ec Teacher	
1989	Her Alibi	Rose	
1990	Miami Blues	Edna Damrosch	
1994	The Paper	Anna	
1998	One True Thing	Muriel	
1998	Just the Ticket	Mrs. Dolmatch	
1999	Hit and Runway	Cousin Rosalie	(final film role)
