= Run for Your Wife (1965 film) =

Run for Your Wife (Una moglie americana)
- Directed by: Gian Luigi Polidoro
- Written by: Rafael Azcona; Ennio Flaiano
- Edited by: Eraldo Da Roma
- Music by: Nino Oliviero
- Release date: 1965
- Country: Italy
- Language: Italian

Run for Your Wife (Italian: Una moglie americana, lit. The American wife ) is a 1965 Italian comedy film directed by Gian Luigi Polidoro.

== Plot ==
An unhappily married Italian man working at a shoe factory travels to America on a business trip. In New York City he meets an old friend who married a wealthy American woman and sets off across America to do the same.

== Cast ==
- Ugo Tognazzi as Riccardo Vanzi
- Marina Vlady as Nicole
- Rhonda Fleming as Nyta
- Juliet Prowse as Jenny
- Graziella Granata as Hostess
- Carlo Mazzoni as Carlo
- Ruth Laney as Girl
- Sharon Obeck as Mary
- Cherie Latimer as Call Girl
- Louisette Rousseau as Call Girl
