= Paulo Duarte (archaeologist) =

Brazilian archaeologist and humanist

Paulo Alfeu Junqueira Duarte
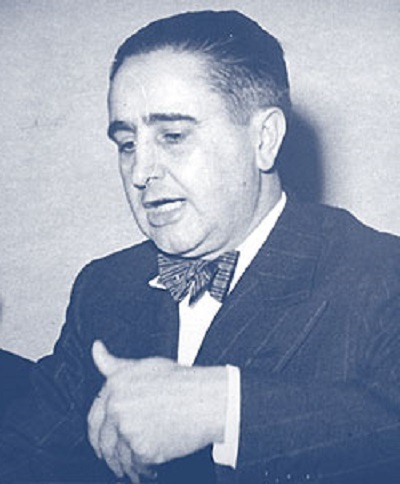
- Born: 17 November 1899
- Died: 23 March 1984 (aged 84); São Paulo
- Education: University of São Paulo
- Known for: Establishment of the discipline of archaeology in Brazil
- Scientific career
- Fields: Archaeologist

Paulo Duarte (November 17, 1899 – March 23, 1984), full name Paulo Alfeu Junqueira Duarte, was a Brazilian archaeologist and humanist. He was the first person to practice archaeology and advocate for the protection of archaeological sites on a large scale in Brazil.

Duarte excavated hundreds of shell middens throughout Brazil which had been mined for lime since the beginning of the colonial period. He established the Pre-Historical State Commission of São Paulo (Comissão de Pré-História de São Paulo) in 1952, housed at the University of São Paulo, to preserve the objects he discovered. He also conducted excavations along the coast of São Paulo state, which discovered a much-publicized pre-historic human skull known as "Miss Sambaqui".

In addition to his archaeological work, Duarte was a leading proponent of Brazilian culture, folklore and art. He argued vociferously for the preservation of the unique cultures of the indigenous peoples in Brazil. With Mário de Andrade and Sérgio Milliet, he cofounded the São Paulo Department of Culture (Departamento de Cultura e Recreação da Prefeitura Municipal de São Paulo) in 1935. In 1937, in retaliation for various public remarks, he was exiled from Brazil by the government of Getúlio Vargas.

Duarte returned to Brazil after World War II, and brought with him a number of European archaeologists he had met while in exile. With their assistance, the excavation of pre-historic Brazilian settlements began in earnest in 1954. Due to several sensational discoveries including "Miss Sambaqui", Duarte became something of a celebrity. He was asked to draft a law for the protection of archaeological heritage in 1957 by President Juscelino Kubitschek. The legislation passed in 1961, as Law no. 3924, and remains the framework for the archaeological preservation in Brazil today.

Taking advantage of his fame to remark publicly on political issues, Duarte came once again into the displeasure of the government and was banned from teaching by the military government in 1969. He was banned from visiting USP from this point, and institution that he had helped found, and never returned. Archaeological preservation laws were poorly enforced by the dictatorship in the 1960s and 1970, and Duarte fought in this period against the destruction of shell middens. He died in 1984.
