= Gian Luigi Polidoro =

Italian film director (1927-2000)

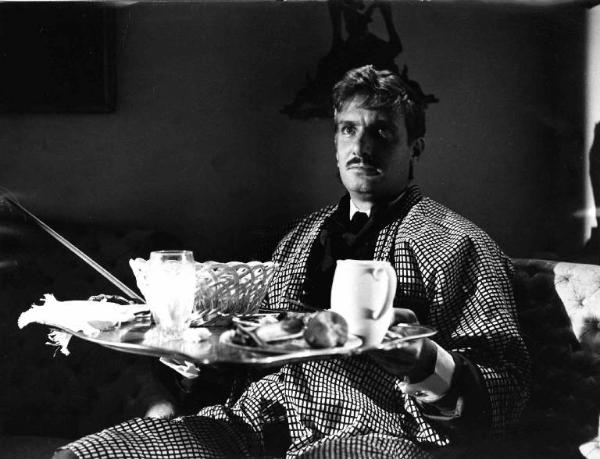
- Born: 4 February 1927; Bassano del Grappa, Italy
- Died: 7 September 2000 (aged 73); Rome, Italy
- Occupations: Film director, screenwriter
- Years active: 1958–1998

Gian Luigi Polidoro (4 February 1927 – 7 September 2000) was an Italian film director and screenwriter. He directed 16 films between 1956 and 1998. His 1963 film Il diavolo won the Golden Bear at the 13th Berlin International Film Festival.

== Filmography ==
=== Director ===
- La Corsa delle Rocche (1956)
- Power Among Men (1958)
- Paese d'America (1958)
- Oeuverture (1958)
- Le svedesi (1960)
- Hong Kong un addio (1963)
- Il diavolo (1963)
- Thrilling (1965)
- Una moglie americana (1965)
- La moglie giapponese (1968)
- Satyricon (1969)
- Fischia il sesso (1974)
- Permettete, signora, che ami vostra figlia (1974)
- Rent Control (1984)
- Sottozero (1987)
- Hitler's Strawberries (1998)

=== Actor ===
- The Great War (1959) - (uncredited)
- The Conjugal Bed (1963) - Igi
- Kiss the Other Sheik (1963) - (segment "L'uomo dei 5 palloni") (uncredited)
- Top Crack (1967)
- Break Up (1968)

== Awards and nominations ==
- 1956 Cannes Film Festival (1956) — Short film competition: Best Documentary (La Corsa delle Rocche)
- Oscar (1959) nomination for Best Documentary, Short Subjects (Oeuverture, producer Thorold Dickinson)
- 1959 Cannes Film Festival (1959) — nomination for Best Short Film (Paese d'America)
- 13th Berlin International Film Festival Golden Bear (1963) (Il diavolo)
- 21st Golden Globe Awards (1964) — nomination for Samuel Goldwyn International Award (Il diavolo)
