= Garrincha: Hero of the Jungle =

1962 film

- Film poster
- Directed by: Joaquim Pedro de Andrade
- Written by: Joaquim Pedro de Andrade; David Neves
- Produced by: Luiz Carlos Barreto; Armando Nogueira
- Cinematography: Mário Carneiro
- Edited by: Joaquim Pedro de Andrade
- Release date: 1962
- Running time: 60 minutes
- Country: Brazil
- Language: Portuguese

Garrincha: Hero of the Jungle (Portuguese: Garrincha - Alegria do Povo) is a 1962 Brazilian documentary film directed by Joaquim Pedro de Andrade, about the Brazilian football player Garrincha. It was entered into the 13th Berlin International Film Festival. In 2006, the documentary was selected as part of a special section of the 63rd Venice International Film Festival, dedicated to Joaquim Pedro de Andrade.

== Cast ==
- Garrincha as himself
- Heron Domingues as himself

== See also ==
- List of association football films
