= David Neves =

Brazilian film director

- Born: 14 May 1938; Rio de Janeiro, Brazil
- Died: 23 November 1994 (aged 56); Rio de Janeiro, Brazil
- Occupations: Film director Screenwriter
- Years active: 1962–1994

David Neves (14 May 1938 – 23 November 1994) was a Brazilian film director and screenwriter. He directed nine films between 1964 and 1988. He was a member of the jury at the 20th Berlin International Film Festival in 1970.

Her work was characterized by a lyrical portrayal of female characters: Memória de Helena (1969), Lúcia MacCartney, uma garota de programa (1970), Luz del Fuego (1981), and Fulaninha (1985). To this last was added Muito prazer (1979) and Jardim de Alah (1988), his trilogy of chronicles about the southern zone of Rio de Janeiro.

== Selected filmography ==
- Garrincha: Hero of the Jungle (1962 – writer)
- Luz del Fuego (1982 – director)
