= Overture (1958 film) =

1958 film

- Directed by: Gian Luigi Polidoro
- Produced by: Thorold Dickinson
- Distributed by: National Film Board of Canada
- Release date: 1958
- Running time: 10 minutes
- Country: Canada
- Language: Italian

Overture (Italian: Oeuverture) is a 1958 Canadian short documentary film directed by Gian Luigi Polidoro. It was nominated for an Academy Award for Best Documentary Short. The film depicts the peacekeeping efforts of the United Nations, set against the music of Beethoven's Egmont Overture, performed by the Vienna Philharmonic Orchestra.
