= Shock Treatment (1973 film) =

1973 film by Alain Jessua

- Theatrical release poster
- French: Traitement de choc
- Directed by: Alain Jessua
- Written by: Alain Jessua; Roger Curel
- Produced by: Raymond Danon; Jacques Dorfmann
- Starring: Alain Delon; Annie Girardot; Robert Hirsch; Michel Duchaussoy; Gabriel Cattand; Jean-François Calvé; Roger Muni; Jeanne Colletin; Lucienne Legrand; Robert Party; Jean Roquel
- Cinematography: Jacques Robin
- Edited by: Hélène Plemiannikov
- Music by: René Koering; Alain Jessua
- Production companies: Lira Films; A.J. Films; Medusa Distribuzione
- Distributed by: Société Nouvelle de Cinématographie (France); Medusa Distribuzione (Italy)
- Release dates: 18 January 1973 (France); 8 February 1973 (Italy)
- Running time: 91 minutes
- Countries: France; Italy
- Language: French
- Box office: 1,857,450 admissions (France)

Shock Treatment (French: Traitement de choc) is a 1973 psychological horror thriller film directed by Alain Jessua. It was released in the United Kingdom by distributor Antony Balch as Doctor in the Nude.

== Plot ==
Feeling at a dead end in life, Hélène Masson, the 38-year-old unmarried owner of a fashion business, books into the private clinic of Dr Devilers on the Brittany coast. Most of the workers, she notices, are unskilled Portuguese men who do not seem healthy, as they are prone to fainting. The clinic's regime for its wealthy clients, all regulars, is centred round fresh cell therapy. Her friend Jérôme, who recommended the place but can no longer afford the hefty fees, warns her that the injections are addictive. Next day he is found dead at the foot of the cliffs, an incident the police inspector considers suicide.

Hélène, who is not a woman to shut her eyes to suspicious faintings or to a suspicious death, starts her own investigating. As she speaks Portuguese, she befriends Manoel, one of the unhappy employees, and going to his room finds him unconscious. Hiding behind a curtain, she sees doctors take a large amount of blood from him.

The young and charming Dr Devilers, aware of what she is up to, takes her to bed. Afterwards, while he is asleep, she roots through his files and discovers what she suspected. Attempting to leave, she finds her car sabotaged and the phone lines not working. Breaking into the laboratory, she finds Manoel's corpse partly harvested for serum. Devilers catches her there and, in a final confrontation that mirrors their earlier sexual bouts, she stabs him fatally.

The police inspector, a regular patient who hopes the clinic will be able continue as before, considers all her tales of horror to be the delusions of a disturbed woman and arrests her for murder.

== Cast ==
- Annie Girardot as Hélène Masson
- Alain Delon as Dr Devilers
- Michel Duchaussoy as Dr Bernard
- Robert Hirsch as Jérôme Savignat
- Jeanne Colletin as Camille Giovanelli
- Jean-François Calvé as M^{e} René Gassin
- Gabriel Cattand as Attorney De Boissière
- Robert Party as Colonel de Riberolles

== Production ==
A lot of well known french actors get completely naked in a memorable and unexpected fun scene. "We started with all the actors except Delon," recalled director Alain Jessua. "Then Delon arrived, and he saw all the actors, everyone naked. He had no choice but to strip naked with the others. It was a moment of madness."

== Critical reception ==
TV Guide wrote that the film "starts off with some clever and suspenseful moments in a relatively good looking setting. However, the tension quickly degenerates. Some attempts at satirizing the affluent pay off but aren't new or terribly witty. Delon gives some energy to his part and Girardot works, but the film never quite comes together"; while Time Out wrote, "Jessua handles his mixture of suspense and satire with assurance, drawing fine performances from Girardot, confused and finally uncertain of her sanity, and Delon as the diabolic yet half-sympathetic doctor in whose arms she finds herself. A neat cautionary tale on human vanity cum fable about hypocrisy."
