= Lovers Like Us =

1975 film by Jean-Paul Rappeneau

- French theatrical release poster
- French: Le Sauvage
- Directed by: Jean-Paul Rappeneau
- Screenplay by: Jean-Paul Rappeneau; Élisabeth Rappeneau; Jean-Loup Dabadie
- Dialogue by: Jean-Loup Dabadie
- Produced by: Raymond Danon; Jean-Luc Ormières
- Starring: Yves Montand; Catherine Deneuve; Luigi Vannucchi; Tony Roberts; Dana Wynter; Bobo Lewis; Gabriel Cattand; Vernon Dobtcheff; Jean Guidoni
- Cinematography: Pierre Lhomme; Antoine Roch
- Edited by: Marie-Josèphe Yoyotte
- Music by: Michel Legrand
- Production companies: Lira Films; Produzioni Artistiche Internazionali
- Distributed by: Gaumont Distribution (France)
- Release date: 26 November 1975 (France)
- Running time: 102 minutes
- Countries: France; Italy
- Language: French
- Box office: $17.8 million

Lovers Like Us (French: Le Sauvage, lit. 'The Savage'; also known in English as Call Me Savage) is a 1975 adventure romantic comedy film co-written and directed by Jean-Paul Rappeneau and starring Yves Montand and Catherine Deneuve, with Luigi Vannucchi, Tony Roberts, Dana Wynter, Bobo Lewis, Gabriel Cattand, Vernon Dobtcheff and Jean Guidoni in supporting roles. The film follows a reclusive middle-aged Frenchman whose peaceful life on a desert island is disturbed by a young Frenchwoman fleeing her hot-headed Italian fiancé.

The film was a commercial success with a total of 2,373,738 admissions in France, where it was the 12th highest-grossing film of 1975.

== Plot ==
Nelly, a young Frenchwoman, becomes engaged to Vittorio, an overbearing and hot-tempered Italian man, in Caracas. Shortly afterwards, she has a change of heart and runs away in the middle of the night, checking into a hotel. Vittorio soon finds Nelly and breaks into her hotel room by entering the next room, which is occupied by a middle-aged Frenchman named Martin, and jumping over the balcony. During an altercation, Nelly knocks Vittorio unconscious just as Martin arrives at her room. As Vittorio regains consciousness, Nelly flees in his car.

Unable to afford a plane ticket to Paris, Nelly goes to the nightclub of Alex, her former employer, to collect the money he owes her, but he does not have it. Vittorio arrives at the nightclub and causes a commotion while Nelly steals a Toulouse-Lautrec painting from Alex and flees back to the hotel. She unsuccessfully tries to sell the painting to Martin. The next morning, he offers to drive her to the airport, where his friend can get her a ticket to Paris. En route, they are pursued by Vittorio and Alex, who arrive at the airport just as Nelly's plane takes off. Later, Vittorio learns from a nephew in Paris that Nelly was not on the plane.

Returning by boat to his life of solitude on a desert island in the Caribbean, Martin is surprised and dismayed to find Nelly, who did not board the plane after customs officials tried to confiscate the painting, so she sold her ticket to charter a seaplane to the island. Nelly asks Martin to take her to Santo Domingo to sell the painting to an acquaintance. When he tries to forcibly take her back to Caracas, she sabotages the boat, causing it to sink. Enraged, Martin hits Nelly.

As Martin salvages a tractor engine to build a new boat, he and Nelly continue to argue but end up sleeping together. Martin reveals to Nelly that he was a successful perfumer at a New York City fragrance company and that he had an American wife, but he left the company without informing anyone to start a new life. The next morning, Martin is building a raft to take Nelly to La Guaira, where she can board a plane to Santo Domingo. Nelly tells Martin that she wants to stay with him, but he rejects her. Heartbroken, Nelly retreats to a nearby shack.

In New York, Miss Mark, a middle-aged woman who has been following Martin and taking photographs of him, arrives at the fragrance company with the photographs. Martin's wife Jessie has convinced the board of directors to ensure Martin's income remotely by buying his fruit and vegetable produce at exorbitant prices without his knowledge, while waiting for him to decide to return, as he is contractually obligated to continue working for the company for eight more years.

After completing the raft, Martin offers to cook dinner for Nelly the night before her departure. When Nelly fails to show up that night, Martin goes to confront her. She says he should have made a move on her earlier. As the two argue, they are captured by the henchmen of Vittorio and Alex, who arrive in search of Nelly and the Toulouse-Lautrec painting, respectively, after Vittorio tracked her down. Martin fights off the henchmen but is injured, while Vittorio takes Nelly away on a yacht. Martin's house is engulfed in flames after a henchman knocks over a stove.

The next day, Miss Mark, flying over the island, finds Martin unconscious and has him rescued. After recovering, Martin receives an ultimatum from the company: fulfill his contract or risk a lawsuit. He refuses to cooperate and spends some time in prison. Upon his release, he returns to Caracas and discovers that Nelly married Vittorio, but later divorced him. At the hotel where they first met, Martin finds that Nelly left him a letter a few months earlier. He travels to Saint-Laurent-des-Bois, where he finds Nelly restoring an old farmhouse, and they fall back into each other's arms.

== Cast ==
- Yves Montand as Martin
- Catherine Deneuve as Nelly
- Luigi Vannucchi as Vittorio
- Tony Roberts as Alex Fox
- Bobo Lewis as Miss Mark
- Dana Wynter as Jessie Coutances
- Gabriel Cattand as Mr. Delouis
- Vernon Dobtcheff as Mr. Coleman
- Rina Franchetti as Vittorio's mother
- Jean Guidoni as a musician at Nelly and Vittorio's engagement party (uncredited)

== Production ==
Director Jean-Paul Rappeneau, along with his sister Élisabeth and Jean-Loup Dabadie, began developing a screenplay inspired by American screwball comedy films such as It Happened One Night (1934). Rappeneau originally envisioned an American actor for the role of Martin, with Elliott Gould as his first choice. However, producer Raymond Danon wanted to cast a French actor instead, so Rappeneau approached Alain Delon, who flatly turned down the role after reading the script. The role was then offered to Jean-Paul Belmondo, who insisted on acting opposite his then-girlfriend, Italian actress Laura Antonelli, but Rappeneau had no desire to repeat himself by reuniting the couple from his film The Married Couple of the Year Two (1971). Yves Montand was eventually cast, after he liked the script and particularly the title.

Rappeneau originally wanted to shoot the film in Brazil, following a trip to the country to present The Married Couple of the Year Two in the early 1970s, during which he imagined the contrast between the "brutality" of São Paulo and the "idyllic atmosphere" of the coastal city of Santos. However, due to the lack of real tropical islands off the coast of Brazil, Caracas was chosen instead for the urban scenes. For the island scenes, Rappeneau, together with set designer Max Douy, used an amalgamation of different places. Martin's house was built in the Bahamas, while the jungle and the mountain behind the house were filmed in Venezuela. The island seen from the sky when Nelly arrives by seaplane is one of the Virgin Islands north of Puerto Rico, and the island seen from the sea when Martin arrives by boat is Port-Cros, off the coast of Hyères. For the scene of the vegetable garden cultivated on the hillside by Martin, some shots were filmed in Venezuela and the reverse shots in the Bahamas. The wide shots of the vegetable garden were filmed in the allotment gardens of Saint-Cloud, along the A13 motorway.

== Reception ==
=== Box office ===
The film recorded admissions of 2,373,738 in France.

=== Accolades ===
Award	Category	Recipient(s)	Result
César Awards	Best Director	Jean-Paul Rappeneau	Nominated
César Awards	Best Actress	Catherine Deneuve	Nominated
César Awards	Best Cinematography	Pierre Lhomme (Note: Also for La Chair de l'orchidée)	Nominated
César Awards	Best Editing	Marie-Josèphe Yoyotte	Nominated
