= Way...Way Out =

1966 film by Gordon Douglas

- Directed by: Gordon Douglas
- Written by: William Bowers; Laslo Vanday
- Produced by: Malcolm Stuart
- Starring: Jerry Lewis
- Cinematography: William H. Clothier
- Edited by: Hugh S. Fowler
- Music by: Lalo Schifrin
- Production companies: Coldwater; Way Out Company
- Distributed by: 20th Century Fox
- Release date: October 26, 1966
- Running time: 105 minutes
- Country: United States
- Language: English
- Budget: $2,955,000
- Box office: $1.2 million (est. U.S./Canada rentals); 361,933 admissions (France)

Way...Way Out is a 1966 American comedy science fiction film directed by Gordon Douglas and starring Jerry Lewis. It was distributed by 20th Century Fox and produced by Malcolm Stuart. The film, released on October 26, 1966, was both a critical and commercial flop, recouping less than half of its production budget. It is also Lewis' first film for 20th Century Fox.

== Plot ==
In 1989, the United States continues to be engaged in a Space Race with the Soviet Union.

The two male astronauts manning the U.S. weather station on the Moon, Hoffman and Schmidlap, are suffering the effects of their long stay in space and need to be relieved, as Schmidlap regularly ties up Hoffman and has even knocked out his two front teeth. The sex-starved Schmidlap sits around drawing lewd pictures of naked women.

Harold Quonset, the head of NAWA, is concerned that the situation with Hoffman and Schmidlap threatens to become an embarrassment to the agency. Furthermore, the Soviets have taken a step forward in the space race by placing the first (unmarried) male/female couple on the Moon. Quonset decides the United States should place the first married couple in space.

With the next NAWA space launch looming, the newlywed astronauts scheduled for the mission, Ted and Peggy, split after Ted is surprised by the expectedly normal events of a wedding night (“you should hear what she wanted to do”). Quonset quickly turns to Peter Mattemore and Eileen Forbes, unmarried astronauts who have been at NAWA for years without having flown a mission. At first Peter refuses to accept the mission because he has other plans. Peter chooses Eileen out of a pile of several pictures of NASA women. Eileen at first refuses to accept the mission because she would be forced to marry a man she doesn't know or even loves. Forbes agrees to the marriage on the condition that they be married in name only, and their vows are exchanged as they are rushed up the gantry for their space launch. Eileen and Peter soon discover that they are not alone on this mission. They are replacing two astronauts on the mission who all that they do is fight. After the other two astronauts leave then Eileen and Peter soon start fighting.

When they arrive on the Moon, they receive regular visits from the Soviet cosmonauts, Anna Soblova and Igor Baklenikov, living at the nearby Soviet lunar station. Antics ensue with vodka pill parties and the men preening for their beautiful female companions. The Soviets are suspected of trying to sabotage the American space station, but they are soon vindicated.

Anna tricks Igor into marrying her by declaring she is pregnant, having gotten the idea for this from Eileen. The wedding is broadcast via satellite to the entire planet, with Peter acting as best man and Eileen as maid of honor.

The media pick up on the Soviets being in line to have the first baby born on the Moon. NAWA head Harold Quonset tells his married astronauts of his unhappiness with the Soviets having scored this crucial first in the Space Race, insinuating that this is because Peter is less virile than Igor and Eileen less sexy than Anna. Stung by this, Eileen declares she is just as pregnant as Anna, delighting Mr. Quonset. After ending the call with Quonset, Eileen tells the startled Peter she's just as pregnant as Anna because Anna isn't pregnant at all. The two have truly fallen in love, and Eileen suggests they could make her pregnancy assertion retroactively true. They are just initiating this project as the story ends.

== Cast ==
- Jerry Lewis as Peter Mattemore
- Connie Stevens as Eileen Forbes
- Robert Morley as Harold Quonset
- Dennis Weaver as Hoffman
- Howard Morris as Schmidlap
- Brian Keith as Gen. 'Howling Bull' Hallenby
- Dick Shawn as Igor Valkleinokov
- Anita Ekberg as Anna Soblova
- William O'Connell as Ponsonby
- Bobo Lewis as Esther Davenport
- Sig Ruman as Russian Delegate
- Milton Frome as American Delegate
- Alexander D'Arcy as Deuce Hawkins (as Alex D'Arcy)
- Linda Harrison as Peggy
- James Brolin as Ted Robertson

The narrator is John "Shorty" Powers, who had been NASA's mission commentator for Project Mercury. Brolin and Harrison appear briefly as newlyweds headed for space. Within a year, these two were part of a make-up test pitching the film concept for Planet of the Apes to 20th Century Fox, with Harrison later cast as "Nova" in that film.

== Production ==
=== Filming ===
Way...Way Out was filmed from January 24 to March 30, 1966.

=== Music ===
The title song is performed by Gary Lewis & the Playboys, led by Lewis' son, Gary.

=== Historical references ===
The film, released in 1966, includes a 1989 futuristic TV news report where Southern politicians are still struggling with the Civil Rights Movement and politician Richard Nixon plans to come out of retirement to reunite the Republican Party.

== Box office ==
According to Fox records, the film did not break even as it made $3,855,000 in rentals, but needed to earn $5,100,000.
