= To Bed or Not to Bed =

- Directed by: Gian Luigi Polidoro
- Written by: Rodolfo Sonego
- Starring: Alberto Sordi
- Cinematography: Aldo Tonti
- Music by: Piero Piccioni
- Release date: 22 December 1963 (US)
- Running time: 103 minutes
- Country: Italy
- Language: Italian

To Bed or Not to Bed (Italian: Il diavolo, also known as The Devil) is a 1963 black-and-white Italian film directed by Gian Luigi Polidoro. It tells the story of an Italian merchant and his experiences during a visit to Sweden.

== Cast ==
- Alberto Sordi - Amedeo Ferretti
- Gunilla Elm-Tornkvist - Corinne
- Anne-Charlotte Sjöberg - Karina
- Barbro Wastenson - Barbro
- Monica Wastenson - Monica
- Ulla Smidje - The Minister's Wife
- Ulf Palme - The Minister
- Lauritz Falk - Mr. Falkman

== Awards ==
Wins

- Berlin Film Festival: Golden Bear
- Golden Globe Award for Best Actor – Motion Picture Musical or Comedy (Alberto Sordi)
