= 13th Berlin International Film Festival =

1963 film festival in West Berlin, Germany

- Festival poster
- Location: West Berlin, Germany
- Founded: 1951
- Awards: Golden Bear: To Bed or Not to Bed; Bushido, Samurai Saga
- Festival date: 21 June – 2 July 1963
- Website: Website

Berlin International Film Festival chronology
- 14th 12th

The 13th annual Berlin International Film Festival was held from 21 June to 2 July 1963.

The Golden Bear was jointly awarded to To Bed or Not to Bed directed by Gian Luigi Polidoro and Bushido, Samurai Saga directed by Tadashi Imai.

== Juries ==
The following people were announced as being on the jury for the festival:

=== Main Competition ===
- Wendy Toye, British actress and director - Jury President
- Harry R. Sokal, West-German producer
- Fernando Ayala, Argentinian filmmaker and producer
- Jean-Pierre Melville, French filmmaker
- Baldev Raj Chopra, Indian filmmaker and producer
- Guglielmo Biraghi, Italian journalist and film critic
- Masatora Sakurai, Japanese
- Karl Malden, American actor
- Günther Engels, West-German

=== Documentary and Short Film Competition ===
- T. O. S. Benson, Nigerian minister of culture - Jury President
- Charles Boost, Dutch illustrator and writer
- Volker Baer, West-German journalist
- Carlos Fernández Cuenca, Spanish journalist and film critic
- Børge Høst, Danish filmmaker and producer
- Wolfgang Kiepenheuer, West-German director and producer
- Abdel Rahim Sorour, Emirati

== Official Sections ==
=== Main Competition ===
The following films were in competition for the Golden Bear award:

English title	Original title	Director(s)	Production Country
Bushido, Samurai Saga	武士道残酷物語	Tadashi Imai	Japan
The Caretaker		Clive Donner	United Kingdom
The Cellar	המרתף	Natan Gross	Israel
The Country Doctor	Retalhos da Vida de Um Médico	Jorge Brum do Canto	Portugal
Chased by the Dogs	اللص والكلاب	Kamal El Sheikh	Egypt
Freud: The Secret Passion		John Huston	United States
Heaven Sent	Un drôle de paroissien	Jean-Pierre Mocky	France
L'Immortelle		Alain Robbe-Grillet	France, Italy, Turkey
The Innocents	Los inocentes	Juan Antonio Bardem	Argentina, Spain
Lilies of the Field		Ralph Nelson	United States
Life and Death in Flanders	Leven en dood op het land	Emile Degelin	Belgium
Man and Beast	Mensch und Bestie	Edwin Zbonek	West Germany, Yugoslavia
The Memorial Gate for Virtuous Women	열녀문	Shin Sang-ok	South Korea
The Mistress	Älskarinnan	Vilgot Sjöman	Sweden
The Reunion	La rimpatriata	Damiano Damiani	Italy, France
Sahib Bibi Aur Ghulam	साहिब बीबी और ग़ुलाम	Abrar Alvi	India
Stop Train 349	Verspätung in Marienborn	Rolf Hädrich	West Germany, France, Italy
The Suitor	Le Soupirant	Pierre Étaix	France
The Terrace	La terraza	Leopoldo Torre Nilsson	Argentina
To Bed or Not to Bed	Il diavolo	Gian Luigi Polidoro	Italy
Yksityisalue		Maunu Kurkvaara	Finland
Young Aphrodites	Μικρές Αφροδίτες	Nikos Koundouros	Greece

=== Documentary and Short Film Competition ===
English title	Original title	Director(s)	Production Country
Bowspelement		Charles Huguenot van der Linden	Netherlands
Flaming Poppies	شقایق سوزان	Hushang Shafti	Iran
Garrincha: Hero of the Jungle	Garrincha – Alegria do Povo	Joaquim Pedro de Andrade	Brazil
River of Ocean	Der große Atlantik	Peter Baylis	West Germany
The Home-Made Car		James Hill	United Kingdom
Merci, Monsieur Schmitz		Alain Champeaux and Pierre Vetrine	France
The Marketplace	Tori	Errko Kivikoski	Finland
You Must Choose Life	Wähle das Leben	Erwin Leiser	Switzerland, Sweden, Austria

== Official Awards ==
The following prizes were awarded by the Jury:

=== Main Competition ===
- Golden Bear:
  - To Bed or Not to Bed by Gian Luigi Polidoro
  - Bushido, Samurai Saga by Tadashi Imai
- Silver Bear for Best Director: Nikos Koundouros for Young Aphrodites
- Silver Bear for Best Actress: Bibi Andersson for The Mistress
- Silver Bear for Best Actor: Sidney Poitier for Lilies of the Field
- Silver Bear Extraordinary Jury Prize: The Caretaker by Clive Donner

=== Documentary and Short Film Competition ===
- Silver Bear (Documentaries): River of Ocean by Peter Baylis
- Short Film Golden Bear: Bowspelement by Charles Huguenot van der Linden
- Silver Bear for Best Short Film: The Home-Made Car by James Hill
- Silver Bear Extraordinary Jury Prize (Short film):
  - Tori by Errko Kivikoski
  - Shaqayeq-e Suzan by Hushang Shafti

== Independent Awards ==
=== FIPRESCI Award ===
- Young Aphrodites by Nikos Koundouros
  - Honorable Mention: The Reunion by Damiano Damiani

=== Interfilm Award ===
- Lilies of the Field by Ralph Nelson

=== OCIC Award ===
- Lilies of the Field by Ralph Nelson

=== UNICRIT Award ===
- The Innocents by Juan Antonio Bardem

=== Youth Film Award (Jugendfilmpreis) ===
- Best Feature Film Suitable for Young People:
  - Ha-Martef by Natan Gross
  - Stop Train 349 by Rolf Hädrich
    - Honorable Mention: Lilies of the Field by Ralph Nelson
- Best Short Film Suitable for Young People: Merci, Monsieur Schmitz by Alain Champeaux and Pierre Vetrine
  - Honorable Mention: The Home-Made Car by James Hill
