= Life and Death in Flanders =

1963 film

- Directed by: Emile Degelin
- Written by: Emile Degelin; Stijn Streuvels; Karel Van de Woestijne
- Produced by: Paul Louyet; Jos Op De Beeck
- Starring: Alice De Groeve
- Cinematography: Paul De Fru
- Edited by: Emile Degelin
- Release date: 1963
- Running time: 82 minutes
- Country: Belgium
- Language: Dutch

Life and Death in Flanders (Dutch: Leven en dood op het land) is a 1963 Belgian drama film directed by Emile Degelin. It was entered into the 13th Berlin International Film Festival.

== Cast ==
- Alice De Groeve as Moeder
- Maurits De Roeck as Jan Boele
- Simone De Wit as Smaak
- Elisabeth Dulac as Ogen
- Dolf Tilleman as Nand
- Veerle Van Laere as Jonge Wanne
- Mathilde Van Mol as Wanne
- Denise Wouters as Tale Siepers
