= Klann – grand guignol =

1969 film by Patrick Ledoux

- Directed by: Patrick Ledoux
- Written by: Jean Ferry; Nathan Grigorieff; Eric Uytborck; Patrick Ledoux
- Produced by: Henry Lange; Pierre Levie
- Starring: Gabriel Cattand
- Cinematography: William Lubtchansky
- Release date: 1969
- Running time: 90 minutes
- Countries: France; Belgium
- Language: French

Klann – grand guignol is a 1969 French-Belgian mystery film directed by Patrick Ledoux. It was entered into the 20th Berlin International Film Festival.

== Cast ==
- Gabriel Cattand
- Ursula Kübler
- Marie Signe Ledoux
- David McNeil (actor) as Poitou
- Nathalie Vernier
