= Patrick Ledoux =

Belgian film director

- Born: 6 November 1934 (age 92); Uccle, Belgium
- Occupation: Film director
- Years active: 1961–1979

Patrick Ledoux (French: [lədu]; born 6 November 1934) is a Belgian film director. He directed 14 films between 1961 and 1979. His 1969 film Klann – grand guignol was entered into the 20th Berlin International Film Festival.

== Selected filmography ==
- Klann – grand guignol (1969)
