= If the Wind Frightens You =

1960 film

- Directed by: Emile Degelin
- Written by: Emile Degelin; Jacqueline Harpman
- Produced by: Hervé Thys
- Starring: Elisabeth Dulac
- Cinematography: Frédéric Geilfus
- Edited by: Emile Degelin
- Release date: 1960
- Running time: 83 minutes
- Country: Belgium
- Language: French

If the Wind Frightens You (French: Si le vent te fait peur) is a 1960 Belgian drama film directed by Emile Degelin. It was entered into the 1960 Cannes Film Festival.

== Cast ==
- Elisabeth Dulac as Claude
- Guy Lesire as Pierre
- Henri Billen as Playboy
- Antinea
- André Dandois
- Gaston Desmedt
- Jacqueline Harpan
- Jacqueline Harpman
- Bobette Jouret as Elizabeth
- Anne-Marie La Fère as Bernadette
- Paul Roland as Nozem
