= Joaquim Pedro de Andrade =

Brazilian film director and screenwriter

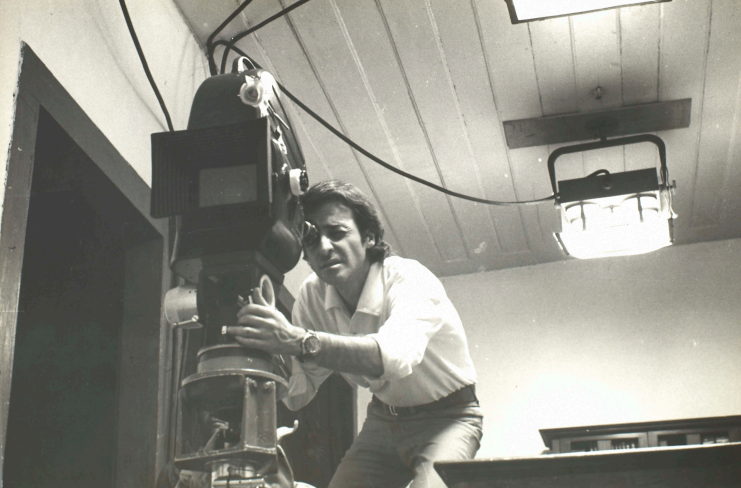
- Born: May 25, 1932; Rio de Janeiro, Brazil
- Died: September 10, 1988 (aged 56); Rio de Janeiro, Brazil
- Occupations: Director, writer
- Years active: 1963–1988

Joaquim Pedro de Andrade (May 25, 1932 – September 10, 1988) was a Brazilian film director and screenwriter. He was a member of the Cinema Novo movement in Brazil. Andrade is best known for his 1969 film Macunaíma, based loosely on the novel of the same title by Mário de Andrade. His 1962 documentary film Garrincha: Hero of the Jungle was entered into the 13th Berlin International Film Festival.

== Filmography ==
Key
†	Indicates a documentary	‡	Indicates a short film

List of films directed by Joaquim Pedro de Andrade
Year	Original title	English release title	Language(s)	Notes
1959	O Mestre de Apipucos ^{†}	The Master of Apipucos	Portuguese	Short documentary on Gilberto Freyre.
1959	O Poeta do Castelo ^{†}	The Poet of Castelo	Portuguese	Short documentary on Manuel Bandeira.
1960	Couro de Gato ^{‡}	Cat Skin	Portuguese	Segment of Cinco Vezes Favela (1962).
1962	Garrincha: Alegria do Povo ^{†}	Garrincha: Hero of the Jungle / Garrincha: Joy of the People	Portuguese	Documentary on Garrincha.
1966	O Padre e a Moça	The Priest and the Girl	Portuguese	
1967	Improvisiert und Zielbewusst ^{†}	Cinema Novo	German, Portuguese	German-Brazilian short TV documentary on Cinema Novo directors Leon Hirszman, Glauber Rocha, Arnaldo Jabor, Nelson Pereira dos Santos, Domingos de Oliveira and Carlos Diegues.
1968	Brasília: Contradições de Uma Cidade Nova ^{†}	Brasília: Contradictions of a New City	Portuguese	Short documentary on urbanization and living conditions in Brasília.
1969	Macunaíma	Jungle Freaks / Macunaíma	Portuguese	
1970	A Linguagem da Persuasão ^{†}	The Language of Persuasion	Portuguese	
1972	Os Inconfidentes	The Conspirators	Portuguese	
1975	Guerra Conjugal	Conjugal Warfare	Portuguese	
1977	Vereda Tropical ^{‡}	Tropical Lane	Portuguese	Segment of Contos Eróticos (1980).
1978	O Aleijadinho ^{†}	-	Portuguese	Short documentary on Aleijadinho.
1982	O Homem do Pau Brasil	The Brazilwood Man	Portuguese	

== Bibliography ==
- Patrice Kirchhofer, « Film saboté de Pedro De Andrade » (2001) in Nicole Brenez, Christian Lebrat (codir.), Jeune, dure et pure ! Une histoire du cinéma d’avant-garde et expérimental en France, Paris/Milan, Cinémathèque française/Mazzotta, 2001, p. 269 (ISBN 978-2-900596-30-2)
