= Emiliano Di Cavalcanti =

Brazilian artist

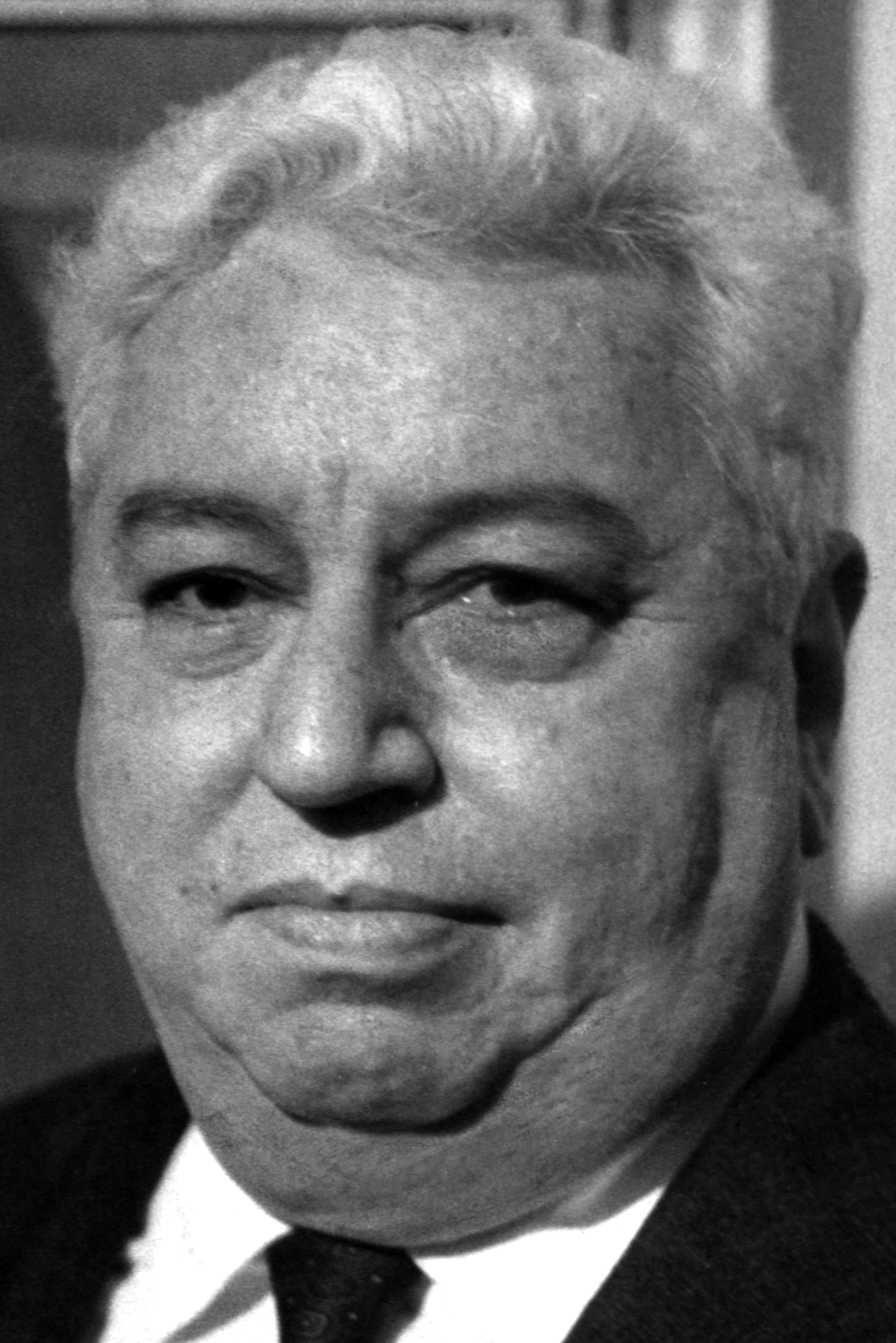
- Di Cavalcanti in 1964
- Born: Emilio de Albuquerque Melo; 6 September 1897; Rio de Janeiro, Brazil
- Died: 26 October 1976 (aged 79); Rio de Janeiro, Brazil
- Movement: Modernism

Cover of exhibition program for the Week of Modern Art, by Di Cavalcanti.

Emiliano Augusto Cavalcanti de Albuquerque Melo (September 6, 1897 – October 26, 1976), known as Di Cavalcanti, was a Brazilian painter who sought to produce a form of Brazilian art free of any noticeable European influences. His wife was the painter Noêmia Mourão, who would be an inspiration in his works in the later 1930s.

== Early years (1897-1922) ==
Born in Rio de Janeiro in 1897, Di Cavalcanti was influenced by the intellectuals he met at his home of his maternal uncle, a figure of the abolitionist movement. This would provide the basis for a lifelong politically driven artistic career, which would start by the production of a drawing published by the magazine fon-fon. He engaged in a pursuit for a law degree in São Paulo but did not manage to complete this pursuit. Di Cavalcanti moved to São Paulo in 1917. At this time he held his first exhibition at the Editora do Livro (o livro bookstore) in São Paulo. This first exhibition would only include caricatures with very viable symbolist influences to be found presented in the works.

In 1918, Di Cavalcanti would become part of a group of intellectuals and artists in São Paulo which would contain artist like Oswald de Andrade, Mário de Andrade, Guilherme de Almeida, etc. This group would be the direct cause for bringing the Semana de Arte (week of modern art) in life in 1922 (see the cover page on the right of this page). This movement along with the Group of Five wished to revive the artistic environment in São Paulo at the time and had as its main interest to free Brazilian art from the European influences found within it. Nevertheless, the works Di Cavalcanti displayed at the Semana revealed varying Symbolist, Expressionist, and Impressionist influences. This can thus be seen as a continuance of European stylistic influences and this would not change until Di Cavalcanti returned from Paris in 1925 to live in Rio de Janeiro once again.

== Years abroad (1923-1925) ==
Di Cavalcanti lived in Paris and Montparnasse from 1923 until 1925. During this time he was employed as a correspondent for the newspaper Correio da Manhã and attended classes at the Académie Ranson in Paris, which led him to meet European modernists like Pablo Picasso, Henri Matisse, Georges Braque, and Fernand Léger. During this time his feelings to create a true Brazilian art would flourish and thus lead to his later works.

== Return to Rio de Janeiro (1926-1936) ==
After returning from Europe and having experienced the modernist movement in Europe Di Cavalcanti would start working on a more Brazilian art, which Di Cavalcanti and the group who held the Semana de Arte already advocated in 1922. During this time he joined the Brazilian Communist Party due to the heightened nationalistic feelings he experienced during three years abroad. Di Cavalcanti embodies the problematic tendency of Brazilian modernists to be pulled into one of two different directions: his subject matter consists of particularly Brazilian themes (mostly mulatto women), but his chief artistic influences are the European modernists and Pablo Picasso most of all.

In 1929, Di Cavalcanti also started to work on interior design, as seen in the two panels produced for the Teatro João Caetano (João Caetano Theatre) in Rio de Janeiro. In 1930 he was involved in an exhibition of Brazilian art at the International Art Center at the Roerich Museum in New York City. At this time he once again was involved with correspondence and magazines as he was the principal writer for the newly established magazine forma.

In 1932, another large group was established by Lasar Segall, Anita Malfatti, and Vitor Becheret which was the Sociedade Pró-Arter Moderna also known as SPAM. The goal of this group was to bring modernism to Brazilian art and follow in the footsteps of the Semana de Arte and encourage a revival of its ideas. On April 28, 1933, this group held the Exposição de Arte Moderna, which was the first exhibition to feature works produced by Picasso, Léger, and Braque, all of whom were known to the Brazilian people, but whose works had not been seen in the flesh before this exhibition. The exhibition pieces from the European masters were all borrowed from local Brazilian private collections. This exhibition was such a success that during the second showing in the fall many local Brazilian artists, including Di Cavalcanti and Candido Portinari, took part in the exhibition.

Di Cavalcanti would be jailed twice for his communistic beliefs and ties he undertook in prior years. He met his wife-to-be, painter Noêmia Mourão (he was previously married to his cousin Maria in 1921) after his first incarceration in 1932 for supporting Revolução Paulista. They married the following year and she became his traveling partner for the years to come until they were both incarcerated in 1936.

== Europe again (1937-1940) ==
In 1937, Di Cavalcanti and his wife Noêmia Mourão would set sail to Paris to stay there until the outbreak of World War II in the start of 1940. During this three-year stay abroad he was awarded a Gold medal in the Art Technique Exhibition in Paris for his murals in the French-Brazilian Coffee Company. After this Di Cavalcanti would produce around 40 works, only to be left behind when he and his wife fled the country on the eve of the German Nazi invasion. They arrived back in São Paulo in 1940.

== Back in Brazil (1941-1976) ==
After his return to Brazil his nationalistic feelings became even stronger, as seen in his representations of mulatto women, carnivals, Negroes, deserted alleys, and tropical landscapes, subjects to be found in Brazilian everyday life and social settings and not in European settings. He lectured about these things in 1948 in the Museu de Arte de São Paulo, providing a lecture on modernism, expressing nationalism, and opposing abstraction. In 1951 the first of the Bienals, held at the Museu de Arte Moderna at São Paulo, featured Di Cavalcanti’s works, along with other artists from the South American continent who were seeking for a true national art. The Mexican Muralists Diego Rivera and David Siquieros were thus personally invited by Di Cavalcanti and actually attended. The exuberance and expression of true South American art was a very strong incentive for the founder, Francisco Matarazzo Sobrinho (also known as Ciccilo), to hold this exhibition again, and there was another exhibition in 1953. The works left behind after fleeing Europe in 1940 were to be recovered in 1966 in the basement of the Brazilian Embassy in Paris.

The friendship with Francisco Matarazzo Sobrinho was a direct effect to the donation of 559 drawings by Di Cavalcanti himself to the Museu de Arte Contemporânea which was founded by Ciccilo. The Museu de Arte Contempemporânea is also better known as the MAC and currently has 564 drawings by Di Cavalcanti in its possession of which only 5 were acquired through purchases and the others through the donation by the artist himself.

== Conversion to Roman Catholicism ==
Di Cavalcanti, a former member of the Brazilian Communist Party and an atheist, converted himself to Roman Catholicism.

== Style and subjects ==
Di Cavalcanti was obviously obsessed with the female body, since very many representations are to be found within the works he produced. The street scenes depicted by Cavalcanti are cheerful, characterized by a palette of bright colors and the depictions of everyday life in a normal, non-romanticized way. They evoke no strong political undercurrent, as do the works of such Mexican muralists of the 1930s and 1940s as Diego Rivera and David Siqueiros. The works produced by these artists were part of the revolutionary movement in opposition of the new revolutionary government who came to power in Mexico. Di Cavalcanti on the other hand refrained from overt political representations, although he himself was in a pursuit of perfecting a pure Brazilian art which had a clear break with European influences.

He tried through the creation of the Semana de Arte in 1922 and the Bienals in 1951 and 1953 to push for a true Brazilian art which was to be seen as separated from European stylistic influences. This was a dream and philosophy which can be seen as an ideal for Di Cavalcanti which was never found as one can see stylistic influences from the Italian Renaissance, Muralism, and the European Modernists.

== List of artworks ==
The artworks below are all on display in the Museu de Arte Contempemporânea (MAC) in São Paulo, Brazil

- As cinco moças de Guaratinguetá, 1926

The logo in front of the fabric focuses around the found m-two girls. On the left is a girl in blue dress with flowers, and blue hat the same color as the dress. While on the right, this is in profile, this one is skirt and blouse with details of the color of the skirt, the shirt on the back with a flower not shoulder and its orange hat. She carries a dated parasol.

It is not a matter of fabric, but others are found in the highest possible position, with a high level of direction: a direct person is in front, with her blue dress and her green head, she has a profile in profile with her pink dress and pink dress, carrying umbrellas to a letter in pink. The two girls are in white stockings.

In the background, the sing is not at the top direct of the screen, with the head resting on the arm that is signed on the window, is the fifth girl. With her orange dress and white hat. She looks out of the screen with her distant gaze.

All girls have the same skin tone, exceeding a blue dress, who feared lighter skin and the finest features. All five girls wear hats.

A shelled wall shows that either place is very simple, but nonetheless, it is full of charm.

Which can be viewed on

- Modern Art Week, São Paulo, 1922

Modern Art Week was held at São Paulo’s Municipal Theater in 1922. The three-day event included artists from different disciplines and presented various European art movements to the public, such as Expressionism and Surrealism. Prior to this event, these movements had appeared in Brazil separately.

The Modern Art Week incorporated dance, music, theater, literature, visual arts, and architecture, and featured artists and writers who would become some of the most influential in the boom of Brazilian modernism that was to follow, among them Mário de Andrade, Oswald de Andrade, Manuel Bandeira, Anita Malfatti, and Tarsila do Amaral. Influenced by Brazil’s rapid industrialization and modernization, the event featured a heterogeneous group that, together, displayed the ambivalent modernization process that characterizes Brazilian modernism more broadly. Unlike many of their avant-garde contemporaries in Latin America and abroad, women artists played key roles in the Modern Art Week and in Brazilian modernist art more generally, especially in visual culture and dance.

As seen above on the right.

- Portrait of Graca Aranha, 1922

José Pereira da Graça Aranha was born on June 21, 1868 in the city of São Luís, capital of Maranhão.

He was the son of Themistocles of Silva Maciel Aranha and of Maria da Gloria da Graça. His family was wealthy and, therefore, Graça Aranha had a good education from an early age.

He entered the Faculty of Recife to study law, graduating in 1886. With a bachelor's degree in law, he moved to Rio de Janeiro, where he held the position of Judge. Later, he was also a judge in the state of Espírito Santo.It was there that he wrote his most important work "Canaan."

Themes such as racism, prejudice and immigration were explored by him in the novel. He traveled to various countries around the Western Hemisphere (England, Italy, Switzerland, Norway, Denmark, France and the Netherlands) as a diplomat. These trips were essential for him to join the modernist movement that was emerging in Brazil. This is because it had contact with the European avant-garde and modern art. He was the organizer of the Modern Art Week that took place at the Municipal Theater of São Paulo in 1922.

In general he was a Brazilian writer and diplomat belonging to the pre-modernist movement in Brazil, as well as one of the founders of the Brazilian Academy of Letters (GLA) in 1897, being the holder of chair number 38, whose patron was Tobias Barreto. In addition, he played a leading role in the Modern Art Week of 1922.

- Le Corbusier, 1923
- Oswald and Mario, 1933
- Maeterlinck, 1934
- Barbusse, 1935
- Duhamel, 1935
- Ungaretti, 1942
- Portrait of Augusto Schmidt, 1950

== Exhibitions (above mentioned) ==
- 1917 Editoro do Livre, São Paulo, Brazil
- 1922 Semana de Arte, São Paulo, Brazil
- 1930 International Art Center, Roerich Center, New York
- 1932 Exposição de Arte Moderna, São Paulo, Brazil
- 1937 Art Technique Exhibition, Paris, France
- 1951 Bienal do Arte Moderna de São Paulo, São Paulo, Brazil (1st)
- 1953 Bienal do Arte Moderna de São Paulo, São Paulo, Brazil (2nd)

== Bibliography ==
- Lucie-Smith, Edward, Latin American Art of the 20th Century, Thames & Hudson, Singapore, 2004
- Amaral, Aracy, Emiliano di Cavalcanti, Americas Society, New York, 1987.
- Lemos, Carlos, The art of Brazil, Harper & Row, New York, 1983.

== See also ==
- Alfredo Volpi
