= Macunaíma (film) =

1969 film directed by Joaquim Pedro de Andrade

- Original film poster
- Directed by: Joaquim Pedro de Andrade
- Written by: Joaquim Pedro de Andrade
- Based on: Macunaíma by Mário de Andrade
- Produced by: Joaquim Pedro de Andrade
- Starring: Paulo José; Grande Otelo; Dina Sfat
- Narrated by: Tite de Lemos
- Cinematography: Guido Cosulich
- Edited by: Eduardo Escorel
- Music by: Jards Macalé; Orestes Barbosa; Sílvio Caldas; Heitor Villa-Lobos
- Production companies: Difilm; Filmes do Sêrro; Grupo Filmes; Condor Filmes
- Distributed by: Difilm; Condor Filmes; Embrafilme
- Release date: November 3, 1969
- Running time: 110 minutes
- Country: Brazil
- Language: Brazilian Portuguese

Macunaíma [makũna'ĩmɐ] is a 1969 Brazilian comedy film directed by Joaquim Pedro de Andrade, based on Mário de Andrade's novel of the same name. It was released in a dubbed version for American audiences in 1972 by New Line Cinema. On June 13 and July 12, 2005, European and Latin American syndicates of the TV5 network aired the film in its original Portuguese with French subtitles. It was rereleased internationally in 2009.

== Plot ==
Based on the 1928 book by Mário de Andrade, the modern-day parable follows the misadventures of a black man (Grande Otelo) who is miraculously born to an old woman (Paulo José), who is supposed to be of the indigenous peoples of Brasil, in the jungles of the Amazon. Though born fully-grown, he has the heart of a playful child. After the death of his mother, he comes face to face with a spring that turns him white (Paulo José). With that change, he and his two brothers move to Rio de Janeiro, but are interrogated by street terrorists upon their arrival.

Then, thanks to an affair with a white lady, guerrilla killer Ci (Dina Sfat), the film's hero fathers a black boy (Grande Otelo) with her. When both mother and child die, he embarks on a quest to recover a magical stone from a rich city dweller. In this film, the essentialist myth of the 3 Brazilian races, white, black, and the original natives of Brazil, is supposed to be represented through the protagonist, his brothers, and his mother.

Throughout his adventures, Macunaíma learns some tough lessons about Brazilian life and society. Macunaima functions as an allegorical representation of the turmoil of the Brazilian military coup that had ensued.

== Cast ==
- Grande Otelo as black Macunaíma
- Paulo José as white Macunaíma/Macunaíma's mother
- Dina Sfat as Ci
- Jardel Filho as Wenceslau Pietro Pietra
- Milton Gonçalves as Jigué
- Rodolfo Arena as Maanape
- Joana Fomm as Sofará
- Maria do Rosário as Iriqui
- Hugo Carvana
- Carmem Palhares
- Wilza Carla
- Zezé Macedo
- Maria Lúcia Dahl
- Myriam Muniz
