= Palaver (1969 film) =

1969 film

- Theatrical release poster
- Directed by: Emile Degelin
- Written by: Yvette Van de Walle; Emile Degelin
- Produced by: Emile Degelin
- Starring: Umberto Bettencourt
- Cinematography: Anton van Munster
- Release date: 1969
- Running time: 78 minutes
- Country: Belgium
- Languages: Swahili, Dutch, French, English, German, Latin

Palaver is a 1969 Belgian fantasy film directed by Emile Degelin. The film was entered into the 6th Moscow International Film Festival. The film was selected as the Belgian entry for the Best Foreign Language Film at the 42nd Academy Awards, but was not accepted as a nominee.

== Cast ==
- Umberto Bettencourt
- Christie Dermie
- Marion Hänsel as Dorpsmeisje
- Jean Kabuta
- Arlette La Haye as Blank meisje
- Grégoire Mulimbi
- Jacques Mulongo

== See also ==
- List of submissions to the 42nd Academy Awards for Best Foreign Language Film
- List of Belgian submissions for the Academy Award for Best Foreign Language Film
