= Macunaíma (novel) =

1928 novel by Mário de Andrade

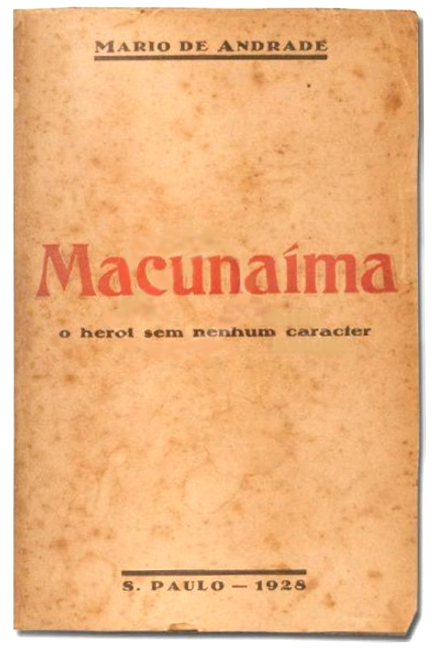
- Cover of the first edition
- Author: Mário de Andrade
- Original title: Macunaíma, o herói sem nenhum caráter
- Translators: Katrina Dodson; Carl L. Engel
- Language: Portuguese; English
- Publisher: Oficinas Gráficas de Eugênio Cupolo
- Publication date: 1928
- Publication place: Brazil
- English publication date: 1984
- Media type: Print (paperback)
- Pages: 224 pp
- ISBN: 0811227022

Macunaíma (Portuguese pronunciation: [makũna'ĩmɐ]) is a 1928 novel by Brazilian writer Mário de Andrade. It is one of the founding texts of Brazilian modernism. Macunaíma was published six years after the "Semana de Arte Moderna", which marked the beginning of the Brazilian modernism movement.

The novel follows a young man, Macunaíma, "a hero without any character," born in the Brazilian jungle and possessing strange and remarkable abilities—mostly shapeshifting—, as he travels to São Paulo and back again. The protagonist is often considered a representation of the Brazilian personality. The novel employs a composite structure using elements of what would later be called magic realism and a number of dialects of both interior Brazil and São Paulo. It is based on Andrade's research in language, culture, folklore, and music of the indigenous peoples in Brazil.

Macunaíma was first published in English by Random House in 1984 in a translation by E. A. Goodland. In 2023, two new English translations were published: one by Carl Engel, published by King Tide Press; and another by Katrina Dodson, published by New Directions, with an introduction by John Keene.

== Style ==
Macunaíma was an attempt on the part of Andrade to write a novel that represented pan-Brazilian culture and language.. The author desired to write the novel in the spoken language of Brazil. Macunaíma's catch phrase "Ai, que preguiça!" is a pun in both Tupi language and Portuguese, as "Ai" is a Tupi word for sloth and "preguiça" is Portuguese for sloth. This is an example of Andrade using a fused language to write this text, which begins with a simple description: "In the depths of the virgin jungle was born Macunaíma, hero of our people. He was jet black and son of the fear of the night."

Considered a "rhapsody" by Andrade himself, Macunaíma is a melding of the cultures of Brazil. Most of the folklore contained within the text is taken directly from native stories; Lucia Sá has shown that Andrade's novel draws heavily on the narratives of the Pemon people that were collected and recorded by Theodor Koch-Grünberg.

== Plot ==
This novel follows an unconventional hero, Macunaíma, who was born in the Amazon Rainforest and is called "the hero with no character" in the novel's subtitle. He is of indigenous origin and possesses magical powers which help guide him on his journey from the Amazon to the city of São Paulo and back. He encounters various different creatures from Brazilian mythology along the way, taking him on a quest to retrieve his stolen amulet, a muiraquitã, who was given to him from his love interest, Ci. When arriving in São Paulo our hero is confronted with industrialization and begins to try and understand this new innovation by making connections between nature. His adventures in the city highlights social critique, exploring class differences, racial issues, and the cultural clash between urban and rural, using satire and folklore. The author uses a blend of mixed languages to represent the cultural mix that is happening throughout the story mirroring Brazil's diverse cultural makeup. After the city adventures our hero, Macunaíma, returns back home to the jungle where he eventually ends up turning into a constellation.

== Cinematic adaptation ==
In 1969, the Brazilian production company Filmes do Serro made a film based on the novel, but with a substantially different storyline. The 1969 film was directed by Brazilian film director, Joaquim Pedro de Andrade. While the storyline differs from the 1928 version, the film retains the original narrative structure. Pedro de Andrade simplified the magical elements of the book in order to relate to Brazil's social, economic, and political state. Additionally, the story takes place in Rio de Janeiro rather than São Paulo, and is set at more or less the time the film was made.

== Characters ==
- Macunaíma: The main protagonist and Tapanhumas's youngest child. A shapeshifting anti-hero born in the fictional indigenous tribe of Tapanhumas (that has the same name of his mother), who is well known for his hedonism, self-centredness and general laziness (his most recurring feature). After he accidentally slays his mother Tapanhumas, he, along with his brothers Jiquê and Maanape, leave their tribe in shame, but he soon finds his true love Cí, who gives him a child. Unfortunately, the child dies of poisoning, and a grief-stricken Cí gives him an amulet before she literally ascends to heaven. However, Macunaíma loses this amulet in a fight against a supernatural snake and has to travel to São Paulo, as the giant who stole it (Piaimã) lives there. After several misadventures in São Paulo, Macunaíma eventually slays the giant and retrieves the amulet before he and his brothers return to their tribe. However, in an argument with his brother Jiguê, Macunaíma literally curses him, but his spell backfires as he himself becomes ill and both his brothers become a shadow-like monster that eventually bonds with the king vulture. To make matters worse, Macunaíma has previously angered the sun goddess, "Vei" when he rejects her daughters sometime before (or a little after) he retrieves his amulet, and in revenge, she tricks him into making out with a monstrous Iara who steals his amulet again and literally tears him apart. He survives, but knowing that he has no true reason to live without his amulet (and that his chance to find it again is slim at best), Macunaíma also ascends to heaven and becomes the constellation Ursa Major. For most of the rhapsody, Macunaíma is a figure of fun and, despite being described as ugly, he's a quite successful ladies' man, which is evident by the relative ease with which he dates (and makes out) with almost all women that he encounters. Macunaíma's character was based on a description found in Vom Roroima zum Orinoco by Theodor Koch-Grünberg.
- Jiguê: Macunaíma's older brother, Maanape younger brother and Tapanhumas's second child. Described as loyal and hard-working, Jiguê despises his younger brother's immature and selfish nature as he makes no effort to help his family. Worse, Macunaíma frequently causes some sort of hard-time or humiliation for Jiguê himself in both direct and indirect ways, having for example, stolen Jiguê's dates and girlfriends even since he was a six-year-old child (indeed, a recurring gag in the book is that any woman who express the slightest sign of romance or attraction towards Jiguê almost invariably ends up having sex with Macunaíma, much to Jiguê's chagrin). For the most, Jiguê is loyal to his family and makes his best to help his brothers, but grows increasingly annoyed at Macunaíma's antics, and after he twice lost magical objects that Jiguê stole to help to find food, Jiguê gets mad at him and refuses to bring any food to their house. Macunaíma, in response, curses Jiguê so potently that he, his Brother Maanape and another lover of Macunaíma, jaguataci, are turned into a kind of Shadow-like demon that decides to get revenge on Macunaíma by eating anything before Macunaíma himself can, but he eventually bonds with the king vulture and becomes his fearsome shadow.
- Maanape: Tapanhumas's eldest child. Already quite old at the beginning of the tale, Maanape has a supportive role and serves as a mediator between Macunaíma's immaturity and Jiguê's short temperament, and while not approving of the former's hedonism, he is always willing to defend him from the latter's anger and do his best to help his younger brothers. The narrator often says that he is a sorcerer, but Maanape's magic is seldom seen, though he twice resurrects Macunaíma when he is inadvertently killed during the story, and the narrator often notices that Maanape already knows something before his brothers themselves notice or have the chance (or interest) to share, implying that Maanape has some sort of foresight or precognitive ability. In the end, he gets turned into the shadow creature cited above by Macunaíma, and eventually gets bonded to the king vulture.
- Piaimã: A cannibalistic Peruvian giant and trader and the novel's primary main antagonist. Also known as Venceslau Pietro Pietra, Piaimã finds Macunaíma's amulet in the woods and takes it with him to São Paulo. Macunaíma make several attempts to retrieve his amulet from Piaimã, but no attempt to trick or to kill him works well (even a powerful Macumba only make him heavenly, but temporally ill). Eventually, though, Macunaíma becomes stronger and, through clever tricks, makes Piaimã fall in the same pot in which he intended to cook the protagonist, and his last words before dying are "Needs salt...". His exact height isn't said, but he is tall enough to use a normal human as an earring.
- Ci: An icamiaba(Brazilian equivalent of an amazon) and nature spirit, Ci, "mother of the forest", was Macunaíma's main and true love of his life. When he first saw her, he became horny and, with the help of his two brothers, successfully overpowers the strong woman and has sex with her. Despite (or perhaps, due to) the rape, Ci becomes infatuated with Macunaíma, and they soon marry and come to love each other genuinely. She also eventually gives birth to Macunaíma's first (and only) son (in whom Macunaíma takes great pride) who already make economic plans for him. Unfortunately, Ci's breast was poisoned by a snake and when she was forced to breast feed him, he dies. In grief, Ci leaves Earth to become a star, but not before she gives Macunaíma a magical amulet as a reminder of their love. this will set in motion the main events of the novel. Macunaíma gains the title of "The King of the Virgin Forest" (Rei da Mata), which grants him the status of nature spirit/deity.
- Vei: The playful, but also vengeful sun goddess and second main antagonist. Vei appears very early on the story, "gently" warming the backs of Macunaima and his brothers as they leave Tapanhuma's tribe, but she gains pivotal importance during the middle of the book in the chapter Vei. During an incident (before or after he retrieves his amulet) in which Macunaíma becomes trapped on a small island, Vei, in mortal guise and along with her daughter, rescued and bathed Macunaima. As they browse in the river, Vei proposes to Macunaíma to married to any daughter that she has (even more than one if necessary), under the condition of respect the marriage and to never have sex with any other women. It is never revealed why she makes such offer (possibly because of his status as the "king of the Virgin Forest" and the playful affections that she already as for him), but Macunaíma soon breaks his promise, and so Vei angrily reveals that, if he had married any of her daughters, he would become immortal. This revelation surprises Macunaíma, but he remains indifferent to Vei's anger as the damage was already done. Vei gets her revenge, though, in the final of the book as she tricked Macunaíma into having sex with a monstrous Iara that quickly rips him apart and takes away his amulet, this time for good.
- Macunaíma's parrot: The last main character to appear, but the very first to be heard as he is also the story's narrator. He "first" appears in the very end of the book, when he finds a sick and lonely Macunaima in his hut some time after he has turned his brothers into shadow. At first, Macunaíma finds him to be little more than an annoyance, but soon (possibly out of loneliness) warms to him and even tells him one of his "famous" fairy tales. On the next morning, though, Macunaíma discovers that the parrot has stolen his amulet and, after a short but heated chase, soon finds the bird and forces him to give his amulet back. However, Macunaíma quickly notices the presence of an attractive woman in the river, unaware of the fact that she was an Iara sent by Vei to get revenge upon him. Sex-crazed as he is, Macunaíma can't help but try to make out with that woman, only to have his amulet stolen and be torn apart by the river monster, while the parrot is powerless to do anything but witness the brutality. After Macunaíma recovers most parts of his body (except his leg), Macunaíma tells the parrot his story and, knowing that there was not point or hope to find his amulet again, Macunaíma plants a magical seed that grows into a giant plant that takes him to the sky where he turns into Ursa Major. Out of sorrow and respect, the parrot decides to tell Macunaima's story to the readers so that his legend will not be forgotten.

== Themes ==
Andrade wrote the character Macunaíma to represent the idea that Brazil had no national character. Macunaíma became a symbol of Brazil's national identity. In order to make Macunaíma this symbol, Andrade strategically created the character as a conglomeration of various cultures. Additionally, within the story there is references to a variety of myths and cultures. The tale was heavily based on the Taulipang myth, Makunaima, which gave the tale its mythical structure.

Additionally, and equally central to the provocative tone and intent of the book, "character" (in Portuguese "caráter") usually means "integrity", not "personality"/"identity", so the "o heroi sem nenhum caráter" of the title could better be translated as "the totally unprincipled heroe" – which is the unyielding theme throughout all the episodes in the story. In this sense, Macunaíma is an allegory of a people whose values include traits seen as counter-values in most Western societies: cunning, trickery, unbridled sexual drive, to the point of remorseless insensitivity.

One of the story's central points is the incorporation of the three main races that make up Brazilian culture: Indigenous, Portuguese, and African. Macunaíma was born a black Indian man and then goes through a racial transformation where he becomes a white man. The confluence of Indian, Black, and White ethnicities is central to the conceptualization of Brazil.

Macunaíma's character also represents a migrant experiencing the new changes and developments occurring in society. His character and the experiences he goes through represents the theme of modernization in Brazil.
