= 20th Berlin International Film Festival =

1970 film festival in West Berlin, Germany

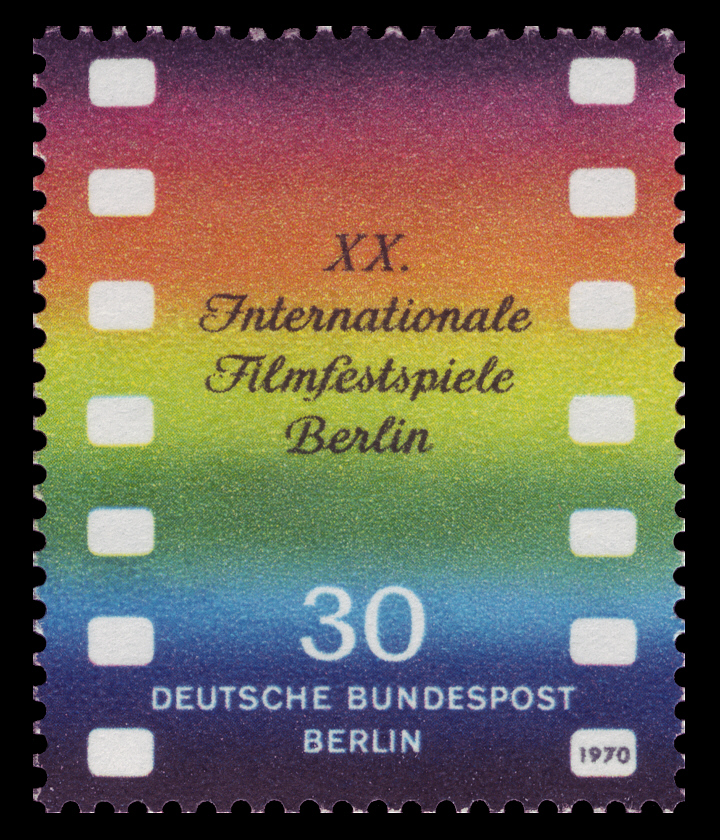
- Festival poster
- Opening film: Klann – grand guignol
- Location: West Berlin, Germany
- Founded: 1951
- Festival date: 26 June – 6 July 1970
- Website: www.berlinale.de

Berlin International Film Festival chronology
- 21st 19th

The 20th annual Berlin International Film Festival, usually called the Berlinale, was opened on 26 June 1970 with French-Belgian film Klann – grand guignol by Patrick Ledoux and scheduled to end on 7 July. However, on 5 July the competition was cancelled and no major prizes were awarded owing to a controversy surrounding the participation of Michael Verhoeven's West-German anti-war film o.k.

The film was controversial for reenacting the 1966 Incident on Hill 192 of the Vietnam War in the Bavarian forest. It depicted four American soldiers kidnapping, raping, stabbing and shooting a Vietnamese girl named Mao until she finally dies. A fifth soldier on the patrol refuses to take part in the attack on the girl and his report to his commander is buried in the files. The film was claimed to be anti-American by the American film director George Stevens.

== Jury ==
The following people were announced as being on the jury for the festival:

- George Stevens, American filmmaker – Jury President
- Klaus Hebecker, West-German journalist and film critic
- David Neves, Brazilian filmmaker and producer
- Véra Volmane, French journalist, writer and film critic
- Billie Whitelaw, British actress
- Alberto Lattuada, Italian filmmaker
- Dušan Makavejev, Yugoslavian filmmaker
- Gunnar Oldin, Swedish journalist and film critic
- Manfred Durniok, West-German producer

== Official sections ==
=== Main competition ===
The following films were in competition:

| English title | Original title | Director(s) | Production Country |
|---|---|---|---|
| A Baltic Tragedy | Baltutlämningen | Johan Bergenstråhle | Sweden |
| The Age of the Fish | Wie ich ein Neger wurde | Roland Gall | West Germany |
| A Girl Called Jules | La ragazza di nome Giulio | Tonino Valerii | Italy |
| Apart from Life | 地の群れ | Kei Kumai | Japan |
| Aranyer Din Ratri | অরণ্যের দিনরাত্রি | Satyajit Ray | India |
| A Swedish Love Story | En kärlekshistoria | Roy Andersson | Sweden |
| A Test of Violence | | Stuart Cooper | United Kingdom |
| The Baby in the Tree | Baby in de boom | Nouchka van Brakel | Netherlands |
| Black Out | | Jean-Louis Roy | Switzerland |
| Borsalino | | Jacques Deray | France, Italy |
| The Conformist | Il conformista | Bernardo Bertolucci | Italy, France |
| The Customer of the Off Season | אורח בעונה מתה | Moshé Mizrahi | Israel |
| Dionysus in '69 | | Brian De Palma | United States |
| Eden and After | L'Eden et après | Alain Robbe-Grillet | France, Czecholosvakia |
| El extraño caso del doctor Fausto | | Gonzalo Suárez | Spain |
| The Howl | L'urlo | Tinto Brass | Italy |
| The Inheritors | Los herederos | David Stivel | Argentina |
| Jackal of Nahueltoro | El chacal de Nahueltoro | Miguel Littín | Chile |
| Klann – grand guignol | | Patrick Ledoux | France, Belgium |
| Of Gods and the Undead | Os Deuses e os Mortos | Ruy Guerra | Brazil |
| o.k. | | Michael Verhoeven | West Germany |
| Out of It | | Paul Williams | United States |
| The Prophet of Hunger | O Profeta da Fome | Maurice Capovilla | Brazil |
| Rembrandt Outlawed | Rembrandt Vogelvrij | Ernie Damen | Netherlands |
| Rotocalco | | Manfredo Manfredi | Italy |
| The Time to Die | Le temps de mourir | André Farwagi | France |
| Why Does Herr R. Run Amok? | Warum läuft Herr R. Amok? | Rainer Werner Fassbinder | West Germany |

== Controversy ==
During the screening of the film o.k., the film was interrupted. The jury, presided by American film director George Stevens, voted 6–3 to demand that Berlinale director Alfred Bauer, who was present at the screening, withdraw the film from the competition. The jury justified their decision by citing a FIAPF (International Federation of Film Producers Associations) guideline that said: "All film festivals should contribute to better understanding between nations". This accusation was based on the fact that the film reenacted the 1966 Incident on Hill 192 of the Vietnam War in the Bavarian forest depicting four American soldiers kidnapping, raping, stabbing and shooting a Vietnamese girl named Mao until she finally dies. A fifth soldier on the patrol refuses to take part in the attack on the girl and his report to his commander is buried in the files. Stevens, who had served during the Second World War, claimed that the film was anti-American.

One jury member, Dušan Makavejev, protested the decision, defended the film, and publicly supported director Michael Verhoeven and producer Rob Houwer. Bauer responded by citing the Berlinale's status as an "A" festival, meaning that once a film was accepted, it could not be excluded from competition. This led to confrontations between the Berlinale leadership and Stevens, as well as tensions with the international press. At a press conference, Verhoeven defended his film, stating: "I have not made an anti-American film. If I were an American, I would even say my film is pro-American. The biggest part of the American people today is against the war in Vietnam". Other directors that were taking part in the festival withdrew their films in protest. The jury was accused of censorship and eventually disbanded, therefore no prizes were awarded and the competition was suspended.

== See also ==
- 1968 Cannes Film Festival
