= Emile Degelin =

Belgian film director and novelist (1926–2017)

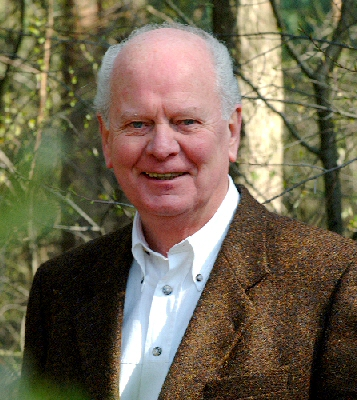
- Emile Degelin
- Born: 16 July 1926; Diest, Belgium
- Died: 20 May 2017 (aged 90); Kessel-Lo, Leuven, Belgium
- Occupations: film director, novelist

Emile Degelin (16 July 1926 – 20 May 2017) was a Belgian film director and novelist, the director of If the Wind Frightens You His 1963 film Life and Death in Flanders was entered into the 13th Berlin International Film Festival. His 1969 film Palaver was entered into the 6th Moscow International Film Festival. His final film, De ooggetuige, won the audience prize at the Ghent Film Festival in 1995.

He is seen as one of the pioneers and founders of the Belgian film. Degelin died on 20 May 2017 at his home in Kessel-Lo, a borough of Leuven, Belgium.

== Selected filmography ==
- Préhistoire du cinéma (1959)
- Si le vent te fait peur (If the Wind Frightens You) (1960)
- Sirènes (1961)
- La Mort du paysan (1963)
- Life and Death in Flanders (1963)
- Palaver (film) (1969)
- Exit 7 (1978)
