= Zhu Min (Russian language professor) =

Chinese linguist

- Born: April 18, 1926; Moscow, Russian SFSR, Soviet Union (now Moscow, Russia)
- Died: April 13, 2009 (aged 82); Beijing, China
- Occupation: Russian language professor
- Spouse: Liu Zheng
- Children: 6

Zhu Min (Chinese: 朱敏; pinyin: Zhū Mǐn; 18 April 1926 – 13 April 2009), originally Zhu Minshu (朱敏书) and also known as He Feifei (贺飞飞), was a Chinese professor of Russian at Beijing Normal University. She was the only daughter of the Chinese revolutionary Zhu De.

Born in Moscow to parents from Sichuan, China, Zhu was raised by her grandmother in Chengdu and never had a close relationship with her mother. While studying in the Soviet Union as a teenager, she was captured by Nazis and held in a concentration camp until 1945. During her imprisonment she kept her identity a secret, telling no one that her father was a high-ranking Chinese military commander.

After the end of World War II, Zhu was able to return to Moscow and continue her studies. She graduated from Lenin Teachers' College in 1953, then moved back to China and taught Russian as a professor at Beijing Normal University. She retired from her position in 1986 and helped found what is now Beijing Military-Civilian Specialist College.

She died in 2009 after a prolonged period of illness and was cremated at Babaoshan Revolutionary Cemetery in Beijing.

== Early life ==
Zhu Min was born on 18 April 1926 on the outskirts of Moscow in what was then the Soviet Union. Her father Zhu De and her mother He Zhihua (贺治华) had met in Shanghai, then moved to Germany and to Moscow together. Zhu De was attending Moscow's Far East University when Zhu Min was born. Zhu De gave her the milk name Sixun (四旬), but He Zhihua didn't like it and gave her another milk name, Feifei (菲菲).

Later that year, Zhu De was ordered back to China to support the Northern Expedition, and He Zhihua sent Zhu Min, still an infant, to live with He's sister in Chengdu, changing her name to He Feifei (贺飞飞). (Her name was later changed to Zhu Minshu and finally to Zhu Min.) He Zhihua fell in love with another revolutionary named Huo Jiaxin (霍家新) and left Zhu De to marry him, while Zhu Min was raised by her maternal grandmother in Chengdu. Zhu Min later wrote that she could never forgive her birth mother for abandoning her and her father in this way.

Zhu did not see her father again for 14 years, until Zhou Enlai and Deng Yingchao urged her to travel to Yan'an to meet him. They were reunited in November 1940.

== World War II and the concentration camp ==
In January 1941 Zhu was sent to the Soviet Union to study. Though she was 14 years old, her father registered her as being only 12. She used the alias Chì Yīng (赤英), which her father chose for her. The character 赤 (chì) means "red", as does 朱 (zhū), her real surname, and 英 (yīng) means "hero"; thus her alias meant "Red hero", representing the aspiration Zhu De had for his daughter. She flew to Moscow with the children of other Communist Party leaders, who were accompanied to the airport by Zhu De, Zhu Min's stepmother Kang Keqing, Mao Zedong, and Jiang Qing.

Zhu had suffered from health problems in the past, including asthma, and after her arrival in Moscow her asthma returned, triggered by a case of tracheitis. To help her get better, the school in Moscow sent her to Minsk on 21 June 1941, to attend a Young Pioneer summer camp. The very next day, Germany invaded the Soviet Union and the Battle of Białystok–Minsk began. Zhu Min, along with 20 other children, was taken prisoner. Two years later, in August 1943, she was sent to a Nazi concentration camp in German East Prussia.

Conditions in the camp were terrible: Zhu was forced to eat moldy bread and was frequently beaten. She was also forced to work at a factory in the camp, manufacturing munitions for the German army, but she and the other prisoners tried to covertly sabotage the cartridges they manufactured by spitting into the cartridge boxes to moisten the cartridges and turn them into duds. While in the camp she got scrofula; she later recalled that the doctors there treated her inhumanely, like an animal, cutting off her ulcers without anesthetic. She had scars on her neck for the rest of her life. In one incident in January 1944, a guard at the concentration camp invited Zhu and five other girls to pose for a photo. The girls smiled for the photo, but suddenly the guard accused them of mocking him and whipped them in retaliation.

In January 1945, Allied forces reached the vicinity of the camp. Zhu heard gunfire nearby multiple times, and on 30 January 1945 she and the other prisoners found that the gates of the camp were open and the guards had fled. She seized the opportunity to escape and decided to head east, towards the Soviet Union, moving during the day and sleeping outdoors at night. But one morning, as she was making her way through Poland, a Soviet man working as a translator for the German army saw her and kidnapped her to use as a hostage in negotiations with the Soviet army.

Soon she found herself in a Soviet refugee camp, where she was assigned to work in the kitchen. All this time she had continued to keep her identity a secret, identifying herself only as Chi Ying, daughter of a Chinese doctor. But at the refugee camp, when a political commissar spoke to her about news from China, she couldn't resist admitting who she was: the daughter of Zhu De, commander-in-chief of the Eighth Route Army. The commissar was astonished that she had survived the concentration camp without her identity being discovered by the Germans. He told Zhu that the Soviet supreme command had been searching for her, with the army ordered to scour every city as soon as it was liberated. On 30 January 1946, Zhu finally returned to Moscow by train.

Zhu Min's experience in the concentration camp inspired the character of Chuchu in the film Red Cherry. In recognition of her tenacity and endurance in the concentration camp, the Russian government awarded her a medal in 1995 for heroism in the Great Patriotic War. She was one of 18 people from China to be so honored.

== Later life and career ==
From 1949 to 1953, Zhu studied at Lenin Teachers' College in Moscow. In 1950, she met a diplomat from Shijiazhuang, Hebei, who was stationed at the Chinese embassy in Moscow. His name was Liu Zheng (刘铮), and the two fell in love and were married in 1952.

After Zhu graduated in 1953, she returned to China and began teaching at Beijing Normal University, where she stayed for decades, first in the education department and then in the Russian department. She joined the Communist Party in 1954.

From 1979 to 1980 she assisted the Military Museum of the Chinese People's Revolution in compiling information about revolutionaries, and in 1980 she was temporarily transferred to the research room of the embassy of China in Moscow. She also wrote and edited books and essays about her father. After her retirement from Beijing Normal University in 1986, she was the founding director of the Military-Civilian Dual Training University of China (中国军地两用人才大学), now Beijing Military-Civilian Specialist College (北京军地专修学院).

She rarely spoke about her time in the concentration camp, even to her family. The memories were too painful.

In her final years, Zhu experienced various health problems caused by diabetes. She lost her sight and her hearing and became unable to feed herself. On 13 April 2009, at age 83, she died at the People's Liberation Army General Hospital in Beijing, due to a lung infection and stomach cancer. She was cremated at Babaoshan Revolutionary Cemetery in Beijing on 19 April.

== Family ==
Zhu Min was Zhu De's only daughter.

- Father: Zhu De (朱德)
- Mother: He Zhihua (贺治华)
- Stepmother: Kang Keqing (康克清)
- Husband: Liu Zheng (刘铮)

She had six children, five sons and one daughter:

- Zhu Chenghu (朱成虎) (originally Liu Jian 刘建), vice president of the People's Liberation Army antichemical research institute (wife Wang Ling, son Liu Ning)
- Liu Kang (刘康), international businessman who traded with Germany
- Liu Jin (刘进), soldier and civil servant
- Liu Min (刘敏), French translator
- Liu Wu (刘武), leader of a PLA research institute
- Liu Li (刘丽), instructor at Beijing Normal University

== Publications ==
- Remembering My Father Chairman Zhu De (《回忆我的父亲朱德委员长》)
- Chairman Zhu De Teaches Us to Make a Revolution (《朱委员长教育我们干革命》)
- My Father Zhu De (《我的父亲朱德》)

== See also ==
- Li Min (daughter of Mao Zedong)
