= China threat theory =

Geopolitical perspective

The China threat or China threat theory is varied set of views that argue that China poses a threat to democracy, peace, military and economic relations, and other aspects around the world. As China's economy grows, some believe that China's system of government and development model are more effective than those of Europe and the United States and that China will eventually replace them. Since the end of the Cold War, the China threat theory has grown in the West, especially the United States, and has affected the US' foreign policy toward the People's Republic of China. The Chinese state view this theory as a rheotical trap by the West to discursively contain it.

The China threat theory does not represent a unified or cohesive view. Different countries and governments have different views on China's behavior and intentions. Some countries view China as a potential threat and need to take measures to deal with its behavior, while others believe that issues with China should be resolved through dialogue and cooperation.

== Overview ==
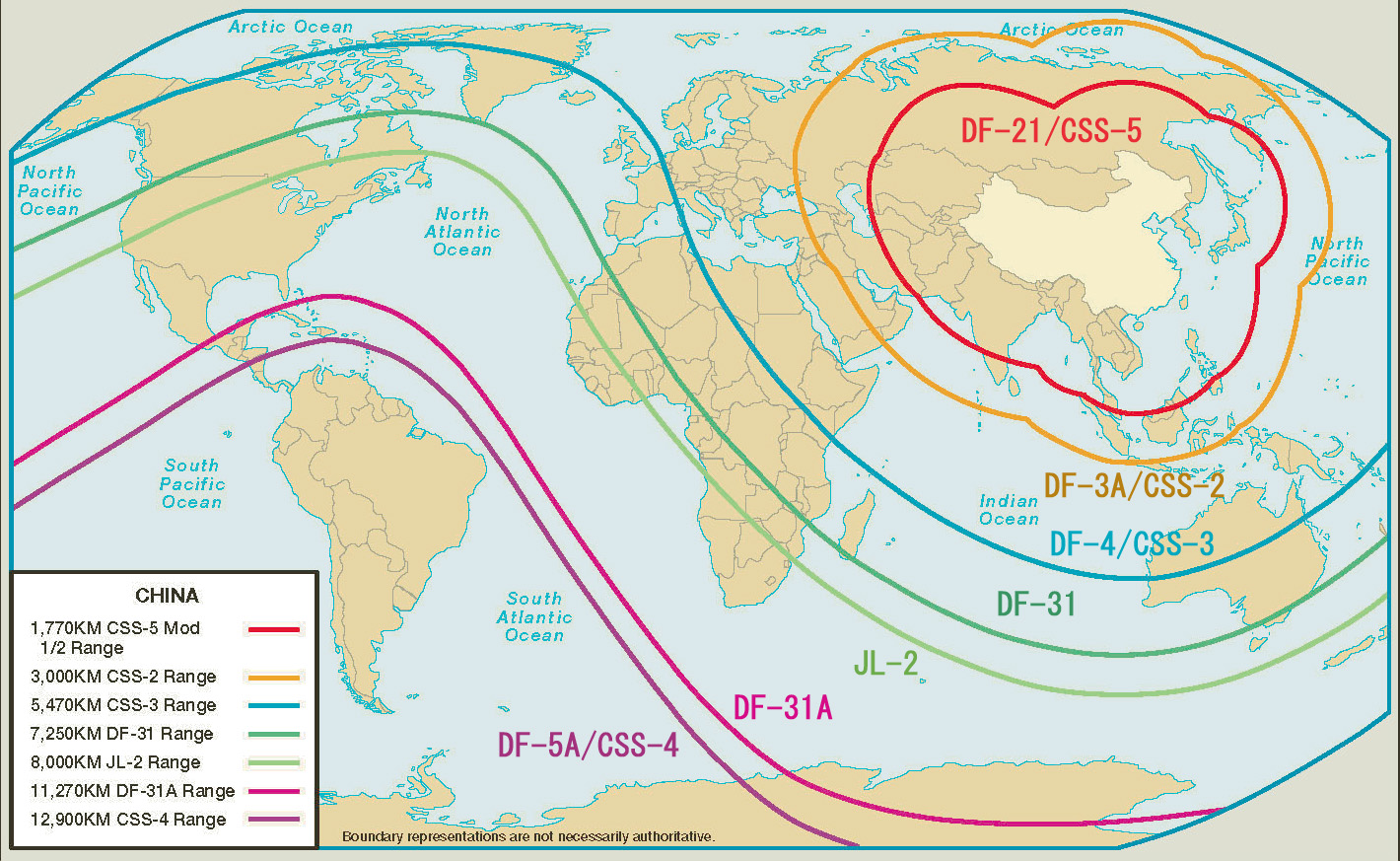
Global Range Map of the Dongfeng Series Missiles of the People's Liberation Army of China

The China threat theory is a statement that expresses concerns and doubts that arise in international relations due to the increasing power and influence of mainland China. After Chinese century, the rapid development of mainland China has posed challenges to the interests of its neighboring countries and the international order. The threats include economic, diplomatic, military, food, population, and even space. Some commentators point out that the dictatorship system in mainland China is the main cause of the threat theory. Chinese officials believe that the threat theory originated from statements used by Western countries to suppress China's development in the post-Cold War era.

== History ==
The "China threat theory" has a long history in Europe. Starting with the "Anti-Chinese Wave" in the 19th century, white supremacist and Chinese labor interest groups perceived Chinese workers in the United States as a "threat" to mainstream American culture. As a result, they exerted pressure on the government, leading to the passage of the Chinese Exclusion Act in 1882 and 1884, respectively. The "China threat theory" during this period specifically referred to Chinese immigrants, not the contemporary "China threat theory." However, the ideology of white supremacy and the conflict between Eastern and Western civilizations, which are reflected in it, can still be found in the subsequent "China threat theory."

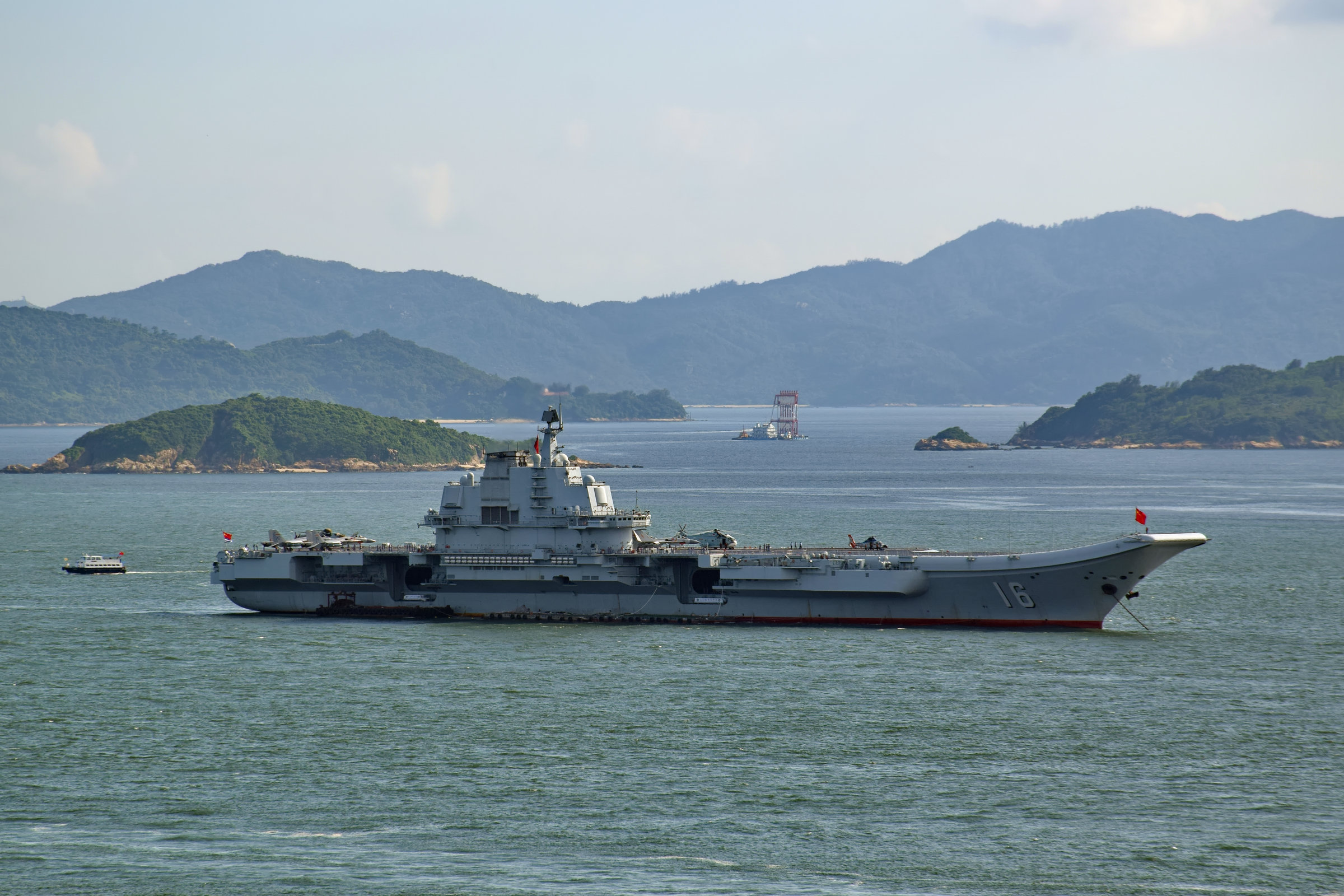
In 2017, the aircraft carrier Liaoning was anchored in the waters of Hong Kong.

At the inception of the Chinese Communist Party (CCP), there was also a surge in the "China threat theory" in the United States. This theory suggested that the success of the Chinese Communist Revolution could potentially initiate a domino effect in Southeast Asia, thus presenting a "red threat" to the United States. The "China threat theory" of this period emerged in the context of the Cold War.

In the early days of the reform and opening up of the People's Republic of China, many people did not have a positive view of China, and some even predicted that it might "collapse".

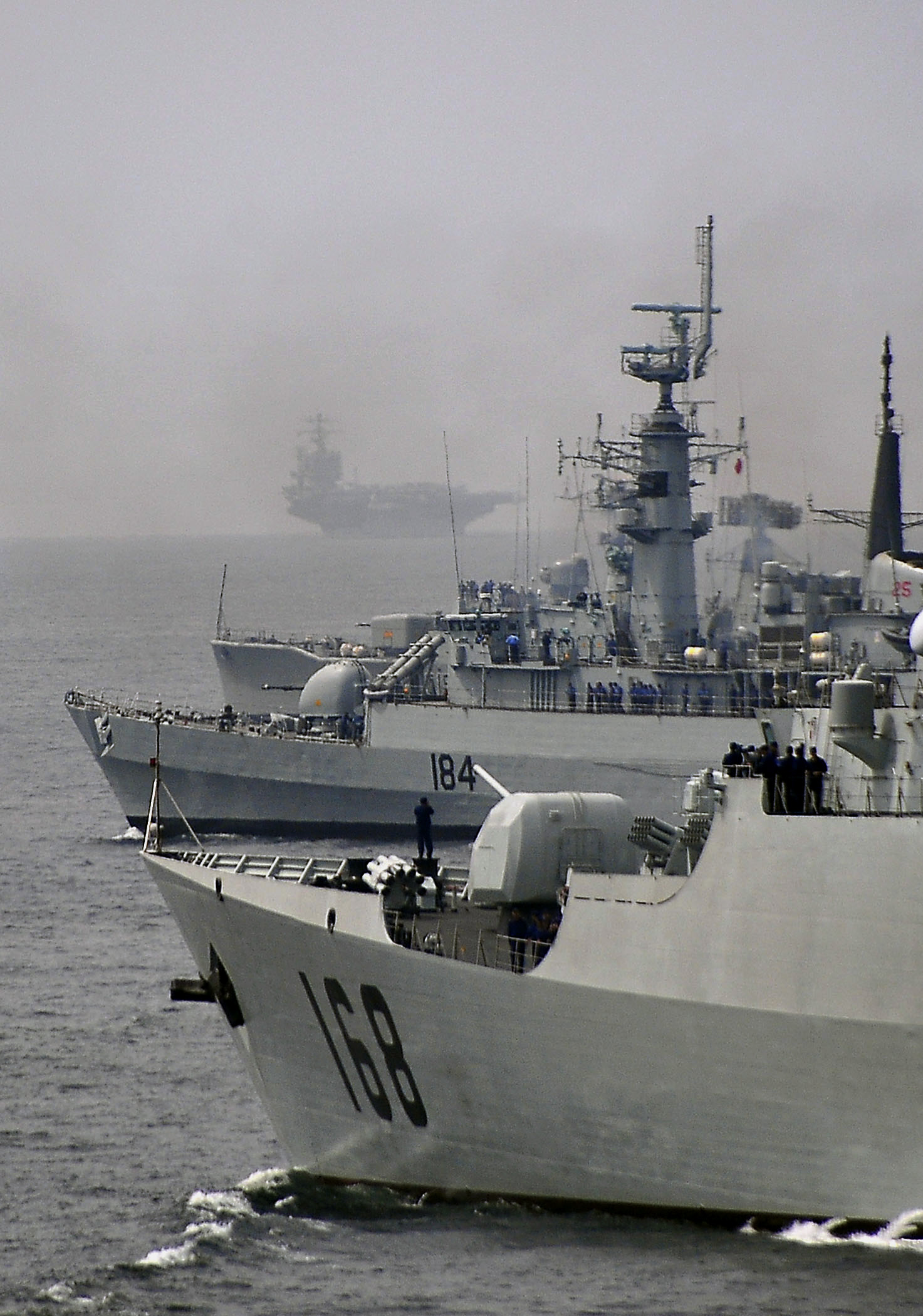
Chinese People's Liberation Army Navy warships and distant US Navy aircraft carriers

Historically, there have been many versions of the "China threat theory," which currently revolves around opposition to the People's Republic of China, governed by the CCP. However, because the state-owned economy led by the CCP is an integral part of China's contemporary economy and is intertwined with the livelihoods of many people, the perspectives of "anti-communism" and "anti-China" may partially coincide.

Beginning in the mid-1990s, the Chinese term 中国威胁论 (Zhongguo Weixielun, "China threat theory") became the more prevalent in Chinese discourse to describe perceived baseless or racist foreign fears instead of the previously more prevalent term Huangguo Lun ("Yellow Peril"). Usage of Zhongguo Weixielun became increasingly common in Chinese media after 2000.

According to Western world, China, under the general secretaryship of Xi Jinping, has demonstrated significant ambition, especially concerning the Status of Taiwan and the South China Sea dispute. China's stance is becoming increasingly firm, prompting the Western world, led by the U.S., to address the threat posed by China. Consequently, the risk of a regional military conflict has significantly increased.

== Threat type ==
=== Economic ===
==== Europe ====
After the European debt crisis, a large amount of capital from China entered the European bond market. The British media, BBC, interpreted it as mainland China gaining control over Europe through the purchase of European bonds.

==== Africa ====
Japan, Europe, and the United States believe that mainland China's investments, trade, and economic assistance in Africa are viewed as "neo-colonialism."

==== Taiwan ====
Mainland China poses the greatest threat to Taiwan's electronics industry exports. In 2015, as mainland China began to transform its economy and upgrade its industries, it also started developing the supply chain for high-tech industries.

==== Other ====
Lester Brown's article "Who Will Feed China?" states that mainland China's large population and high food demand will lead to global food supply shortages. But the world's food production has been in surplus for many years. Food shortage problems only exist in places with political and military turmoil, not due to insufficient food supply.

=== Strategic ===
Alongside economic growth, mainland China's military spending has also increased, raising concerns among neighboring countries, regions, and the United States.

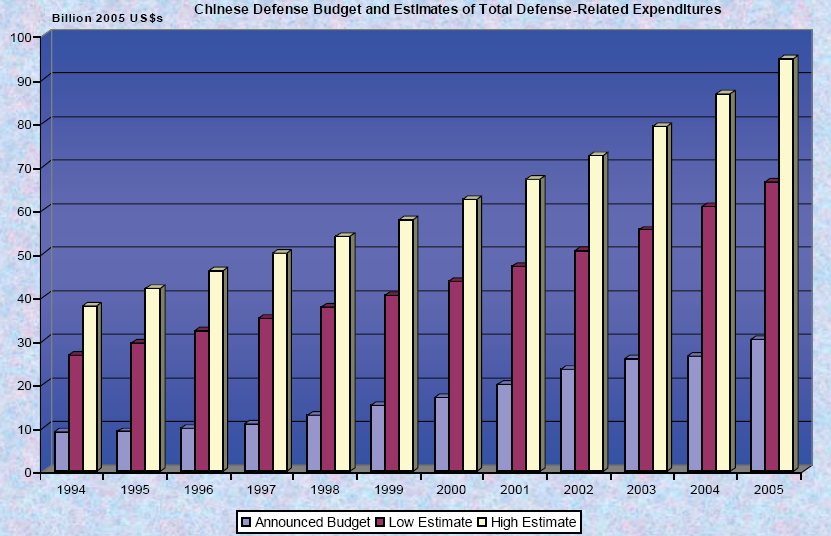
The growth of China's military spending comes from the 2006 Military Power Report of the People's Republic of China

==== America ====
As of 2023, China's military expenditure is second only to that of the United States. Some individuals argue that this poses a threat to the United States' global leadership position. However, the gap between the Chinese and U.S. militaries is still very large. The military expenditure of the United States is three to four times higher than that of China, surpassing the combined total of the countries ranked second to fifteenth.

==== Japan ====
The Island chain strategy in the East China Sea has sparked a disagreement between China and Japan regarding the sovereignty of the Senkaku Islands and their affiliated islands in the East China Sea. The conflict escalated further after Japan announced the nationalization of the Diaoyu Islands.

==== Taiwan ====
Mainland China's insistence on the policy of a united front against Taiwan, along with the military buildup on both sides of the Taiwan Strait, has created a sense of threat for Taiwan. The government of the Republic of China announced the end of mobilization to fight the rebellion in 1991, thereby declaring an end to hostilities between the two sides.

Conflicts with Taiwan, particularly the 1995–96 Third Taiwan Strait Crisis, occurred before the first direct citizen election of the President of the Republic of China (aka President of Taiwan) in 1995–96. During this time, Taiwan had just experienced the 1989 Tiananmen Square protests and massacre and the Qiandao Lake incident. These conflicts have highlighted the threat posed by the Chinese Communist Party and continue to influence Taiwanese politics to this day. The Chinese Communist Party still adheres to one-party rule. Some believe that the human rights situation in the People's Republic of China has continued to deteriorate after the Beijing Olympics. China maintains its position of using force to resolve the Taiwan issue and has deployed approximately 2,000 missiles targeting Taiwan. All of these factors have led to the discontent, concern, and strong opposition of the Republic of China and many Taiwanese people towards the increasing influence of the Chinese Communist Party and mainland China.

==== South China Sea ====
Conflicts with several countries, such as Vietnam and the Philippines, over sovereignty in the South China Sea have caused many nations to feel threatened by mainland China. Countries that have sovereignty disputes with China in the South China Sea include Malaysia, Brunei, and Indonesia. On April 24, 2021, the EU accused China of endangering peace in the South China Sea. The EU has issued a new policy aimed at bolstering its influence in the Indo-Pacific in response to Chinese Century influence.

== Worldwide attitudes ==
The perception of the threat posed by mainland China differs from time and place. Further, the concept of "China threat theory" does not have a definitive stance and is sometimes even ambiguous.

After the 1989 Tiananmen Square protests and massacre, some media and individuals believed that the authorities in mainland China began promoting nationalist and authoritarian political propaganda to consolidate their power. They successively promoted nationalist media, such as the Global Times, threatened Taiwan with force, and simultaneously increased military spending. They also engaged in espionage to acquire military and economic secrets from other nations. They also declared sovereignty over disputed waters. Outside observers have increasingly come to view mainland China as a military and political threat.

=== Taiwan ===
The Constitution of the Republic of China stipulates that the sovereignty of the Republic of China extends to the entire territory of China. The term "China threat theory" refers to the perceived threat posed by the government of the People's Republic of China, which governs mainland China.

After the government of the Republic of China lifted martial law in 1987, measures such as allowing family visits and opening up cross-strait relations gradually led to a reduction in tensions; However, first of all, the 1989 Tiananmen Square protests and massacre in mainland China, and later the Qiandao Lake incident, among others, have generally left Taiwanese people with a negative impression of mainland China.

In recent years, Taiwan has undergone a revision of the Constitution of the Republic of China and has ceased temporary provisions against the communist rebellion since 1991. The Government of the Republic of China no longer considers the CCP and the Government of the People's Republic of China as enemies or rebels. However, the former often discussed their perspectives and positions on various topics, including the Second Sino-Japanese War, the Chinese Civil War, the non-recognition of the Government of the Republic of China, Taiwan democratization, Taiwanization, and Taiwan independence movement. These discussions were deemed unacceptable by the government of the Republic of China, especially the Kuomintang. Show force and suppress Taiwan's international presence.

Wang Jin-pyng, the former president of the Legislative Yuan of the Republic of China, has stated that given mainland China's increasing military capabilities, Taiwan should take a more proactive approach in International organizations. This includes strengthening alliances with the United States and Japan and continuing to enhance its self-defense capabilities. These measures are necessary to ensure peace and security in the Asia-Pacific region and across the Taiwan Strait.

Former president Tsai Ing-wen of the Republic of China believes that the democratization of mainland China has always had an impact on the process of cross-strait relations and the stability of the Taiwan Strait. Democracy and human rights are Taiwan's most important assets, and Taiwan should actively support mainland China in its democratic process.

=== Malaysia ===
Malaysian Prime Minister Mahathir Mohamad was the first Asian leader to reject the "China threat theory." When the "China threat theory" prevailed in Southeast Asia in the 1990s, Mahathir once stated that China was a significant country in the region and had the potential to contribute positively to regional politics, economy, and security. Therefore, he advocated for practical cooperation with China. On May 26, 2012, he conducted an exclusive interview with The Nikkei regarding the "China threat theory" and stated:

It is inappropriate for any country to perceive other countries as a "threat". If China wants to block it, it may resort to military expansion, which could trigger an arms race. China has been a trading nation throughout history and has never been an imperialist country. It is necessary for Asian countries to enhance mutual understanding through dialogue.

— Mahathir Mohamad

=== United States ===
In the context of the post-Cold War era, on December 13, 1991, New York Times columnist Leslie H. Gelb wrote an article titled "Breaking China Apart". Later, Charles Krauthammer wrote "Why We Must Contain China". The remarks made by Major General Zhu Chenghu of the Chinese People's Liberation Army regarding US nuclear weapons have caused great controversy.

China threat theory is highly popular among neoconservative circles. Their idea is that the United States has a special responsibility to lead other countries towards a democratic future. Additionally, they believe that the United States should strive to become the sole superpower in the world.

After assuming office as the General Secretary of the Chinese Communist Party in 2012, Xi Jinping led China to abandon its strategy of "hiding its power and biding its time" and instead implemented the "One Belt, One Road" initiative. With China's comprehensive rise in various fields and the increasing threats it poses, some factions within the American Republican Party, who were previously supportive of China (such as David Shambaugh), have changed their position. They suggested that the US government gradually abandon its engagement policy with China and adopt a more assertive strategy. Although the Republican Party and Democratic Party have serious differences and conflicts in domestic affairs, they both agree that China poses a threat to the United States' military, economic, and intellectual property rights. The United States House Select Committee on Strategic Competition between the United States and the Chinese Communist Party established in 2023 in response to China threat.

=== Japan ===
On December 22, 2005, Japanese Foreign Minister Aso Taro made a statement stating that "China is becoming a threat", marking the first time a member of the cabinet had publicly raised the "China threat theory". Shinzo Abe also stated that in the past 20 years, China's military spending has grown rapidly and has now reached about 20 times.

On January 29, 2017, the Sunday Times reported that the Japanese Embassy in the UK paid £10,000 per month to the Henry Jackson Society, a right-wing think tank in the UK. Some British parliamentarians who were close to the Henry Jackson Association were invited by the Japanese government to visit Japan to help Japan create and promote the China threat theory in the UK; In the report of the Chinese media Global Vision, Okada Chong, a guest commentator of Kyodo News Agency, also claimed that many Japanese journalists privately lamented that "if you don't add comments criticizing China in your manuscript, your manuscript will not pass", "this is not the order of your boss, but the self-censorship of journalists", "China threat theory has become normal in Japan's speech space", and so on.

=== India ===
The tension in military relations between China and India mainly lies in the disputed Sino-Indian border dispute between the two sides, as well as military assistance to Pakistan. In May 1998, Indian Defense Minister George Fernandez promoted the statement that "China is the potential number one threat to India" after conducting a nuclear test in India. Afterward, Fernandez himself withdrew this statement and expressed his desire to be friendly with China, but the strengthening of India's military deployment was considered by various military experts to be aimed at China and Pakistan.

=== Soviet Union/Russia ===
In the early 1960s, after the serious deterioration of Sino-Soviet relations, there were arguments about China's threat to the Soviet Union and the world. After the Zhenbao Island incident in 1969, China and the Soviet Union fell into a high state of tension, and due to China's subsequent mobilization action (Order No. 1), the Siberia region of the Soviet Union was quite sparsely populated and difficult to defend, raising fears of China's military threat throughout the Soviet Union. This China threat ideology is also very common among the dissident Soviet intellectual community, as historian Roy Medvedev wrote:

Joseph Stalin did not fully consider Adolf Hitler's adventurism in 1941. He believed that Hitler would start from analyzing practical factors rather than from fantasies. Today, especially in the current situation of Soviet China relations, we should not forget the lessons of 1941; Because [Mao Zedong] did not act from analyzing actual factors, but from his own sometimes extremely absurd ideas about the actual situation. Therefore, we should consider the irrational risk-taking behavior from the Mao Zedong Group.

== Criticism ==
On June 15, 1993, when meeting with Malaysian Prime Minister Mahathir Mohamad, General Secretary of the Chinese Communist Party Jiang Zemin said that China's limited national defense capabilities are entirely for self-defense and are defensive in nature. Those who spread the rhetoric of "Chinese threat" and "China needs to fill the vacuum" are actually provoking relations among Asian countries, attempting to achieve the goal of divide and rule, which will not succeed. After quoting the Chinese proverb "The distance you go will tell you the strength of your horse, and the time you will see will tell your heart", Jiang Zemin said that the world will see that China is and will be a staunch force in safeguarding peace in Asia and the world.

Since the People's Republic of China implemented reform and opening up, China's rise in economic, political, military and other comprehensive strength, and the so-called "China threat theory" has been spreading from Japan, Taiwan, South Korea, the United States and other neighboring countries and world powers, indicating that the rise of foreigners in China will affect and threaten their own interests. These countries try to use the "China threat theory" to slow down China's development or isolate China in the international arena.

Kuai Zheyuan, a senior CCP official, pointed out that there are no more than three reasons why foreign countries propose the "China threat theory":

1. The rapid pace and scale of China's economic and military rise have left the United States, Europe, and Asian countries (especially China's neighboring countries) overwhelmed and deeply surprised, unable to stop, resist, and adapt, resulting in a sense of national crisis and frustration in national psychology; From economy, politics, security, psychology, and self-esteem, I feel threatened by the powerful rise of China. Especially in the United States, the whole country is strongly aware that the rising China is catching up with and even surpassing the United States in some fields, seriously threatening the global interests of the United States and fiercely challenging its world leadership. Therefore, it has created international public opinion of "China threat" and "China fear" to isolate and contain China.
2. The recent adjustment of China's mentality and strategy as a major power after its rise has been somewhat hasty and radical. This creates a negative image of a hard rise rather than a soft rise for the international community, especially for developed Western countries and China's neighboring countries, resulting in negative effects and negative impacts, leading to concerns and even panic about China's strength and toughness. Recently, Valerie Niche, an analyst at the French Strategic Research Foundation, emphasized that "in the past year or two, developed countries have realized that China's image is no longer as positive as before. On February 3rd, the French newspaper "Les Echos" stated in an article: "Every week, there is a situation where China's actions cause panic among our political and economic circles.
3. China, which has emerged in the new era, has its own historical, practical, and developed civilization, which is fundamentally different in essence and concept from historical empires such as the British, Germany, America, and Japanese empires. However, China's advanced civilization concept, development concept, and rise concept are severely lagging behind in terms of propaganda and dissemination, and as the world's second-largest economy, its discourse power is lacking and its application is even weaker. Therefore, in the face of the "China threat theory" and "China phobia", from theory to practice, it is only a passive response, with no way to crack it and no ability to resolve it.

In early 2017, The Sunday Times reported that Japan had invested in exaggerating China's threat theory, which was seen as a diplomatic means of trying to suppress China's diplomatic policies.

== See also ==
- Anti-communism
- China's peaceful rise
- Chinese virus (politics)
- Red Scare
- The Coming Collapse of China
- Yellow Peril
- Zhu Chenghu
