= Red Cherry =

- Red Cherry DVD cover

Chinese name
- Traditional Chinese: 紅櫻桃
- Simplified Chinese: 红樱桃
- Literal meaning: red cherry
Transcriptions
Standard Mandarin
- Hanyu Pinyin: Hóng Yīngtáo
Yue: Cantonese
- Jyutping: hung4 jing1 tou4
- Directed by: Ye Ying
- Written by: Jiang Qitao; Lu Wei; Ye Ying
- Produced by: Ye Ying; Li Zhijian
- Starring: Guo Ke-Yu; Vladmill Nizmiroff; Xu Xiaoling
- Cinematography: Zhang Li
- Edited by: Wang Xiaoming
- Music by: Yang Liqing
- Production company: Beijing Film Academy Youth Film Studio
- Distributed by: Orange Sky Golden Harvest Beijing TV & Film Production Co. Ltd. Fox Lorber (DVD)
- Release date: 1 December 1995
- Running time: 120 minutes
- Languages: Russian; German; Mandarin

Red Cherry (Chinese: 紅櫻桃) is a 1995 film directed by Ye Ying (also known as Daying Ye). The director of photography was Zhang Li, a fifth generation filmmaker and classmate of Chen Kaige. Red Cherry won Best Picture at the 1996 Golden Rooster Awards.

The film was made in China in 1995 under the title Hong ying tao starring Ke-Yu Guo, Vladmill Nizmiroff, Xu Xiaoling. The movie is based on the true story of Chuchu (based on Zhu De's daughter Zhu Min), a 13-year-old Chinese girl, and Luo Xiaoman, a 12-year-old Chinese boy, who were sent to Moscow, Russia in the 1940s and enrolled into an international boarding school. There they had many great and difficult experiences as they tried to survive during World War II.

The children's real encounter with fate began as kanikuli (summer break) arrived. Chuchu accompanied her class to a children’s camp in Belarus, while Xiaoman remained in Moscow. Then, Russia was invaded by Germany's Operation Barbarossa. Red Cherry is basically an account of the two orphans' parallel experiences of the war.

The film was China's biggest box office hit in 1995. Internationally, the film was selected in the Panorama section of the Berlin International Film Festival in 1996. The film also won the Audience Choice award (Best Foreign Language Film) in the Palm Springs International Film Festival in 1996. It was also selected as the Chinese entry for the Best Foreign Language Film at the 68th Academy Awards, but was not accepted as a nominee.

== Plot ==
The film begins in the early summer of 1941, at the Ivanov International School in Moscow. Luo Xiaoman and Chuchu were two new students who had come to Russia after the brutal White Terror in China killed their parents (as Chuchu described in front of her class how her father, a communist revolutionary, being executed by waist chop in front of her by the Kuomintang). Chuchu and Luo quickly learned to fit in with the other international students and they also learned to speak Russian fluently.

When summer came, several students, including Chuchu, left for the summer camp in Belarus accompanied by their teacher, Miss Vera. Xiaoman remained behind in Moscow. During this time Nazi Germany invaded the Soviet Union and Moscow was half evacuated after the invasion. Xiaoman was soon left to survive on his own in a land that he knew little of. For a time he was a homeless child begging and stealing on the streets, forced to sell blood so he could get money for food (only to be robbed by others later). He eventually found a job delivering condolence letters to families of fallen soldiers. At one apartment, he found an orphaned girl (whose mother died silently due to starvation and illness) and took her in as though she was his own daughter.

Things were very different for the students at the summer camp. Captured by the German invaders, Chuchu and her classmates were kept as slaves, and were alone and in great danger. Miss Vera was soon ruthlessly murdered in front of the students for defying the Germans by teaching her class. One of the students, Karl, who was half-German himself and liked Chuchu deeply, used his Aryan identity to trick a German soldier's trust and stole an MP 40 submachine gun, allowing the other students escape, but he was soon injured, cornered and machinegunned to death in a forest pit. The others were also quickly recaptured and sentenced to death by hanging. An old man and one girl were executed with a brutal shot to the head, but Chuchu and several other students were spared when a high-ranking German officer, General Von Dietrich, arrived and sent them to work as servants at Nazi headquarters in the Yakovlev Monastery.

General Von Dietrich was not only a military general, but also a perverted doctor who took tattooing as a hobby — he enjoyed tattooing heraldries on the bodies of young girls and parading them to his guests at parties, and decided to use Chuchu for his greatest "masterpiece". This was ironically what saved her life, because when the General learned that the Third Reich was doomed, instead of having Chuchu executed with the rest of the prisoners, he had her dumped in a field so that his "masterpiece" would live on before committing suicide himself. The large tattoo (a Nazi eagle) on her back caused others to discriminate her, and become a shame to her for the rest of her life.

Meanwhile, Luo Xiaoman tried to enlist in the expeditionary Soviet Red Army, but was rejected due to his young age. Out of his deep, vengeful hatred towards the Nazi invaders, he decided to "punish" the German POWs (who were now forced to work in a nearby labour camp) by sniping them with a home-made slingshot. When the German prisoners rioted, Xiaoman lured them into an empty, ruined apartment building and set the oil tanks on fire, killing himself in the explosion together with the German rioters.

At the end of the movie Chuchu was reunited with the orphan girl Luo Xiaoman adopted, and after hearing the same speech Xiaoman gave for his Russian class, Chuchu understood, embraced the young girl and broke down. Chuchu was later seen taking a shower, and the tattoo on her back could be seen along with the scar caused by her attempt to burn off the tattoo with firewood. Later credits appear telling that a skin graft operation to remove the tattoo was not successful, and about the real Chuchu and what she did with her life.

== Cast ==
- Guo Keyu as Chuchu
- Vladmill Nizmiroff as General Von Dietrich
- Xu Xiaoling as Luo Xiaoman
- Daniil Belykh as Karl

== Awards ==
- 2nd Shanghai International Film Festival, 1995
  - Best Actress — Guo Keyu
- Golden Rooster Awards, 1996
  - Best Film
  - Best Sound — Li Lanhua

== See also ==
- List of submissions to the 68th Academy Awards for Best Foreign Language Film
- List of Chinese submissions for the Academy Award for Best Foreign Language Film
