= Shanghai Orphans =

Children displaced in the Great Chinese Famine

Shanghai Orphans (simplified Chinese: 上海孤儿; traditional Chinese: 上海孤兒; pinyin: Shànghǎi gūér, officially romanized to State's children【國家的孩子】), refers to 3000 orphans from Shanghai that were transferred to the Inner Mongolia Autonomous Region during the nationwide Great Chinese Famine, in the People's Republic of China.

During the Great Leap Forward, the Chinese government set up People's commune and communal kitchens. However, famine soon struck. The poor were unable to feed themselves, and their children had no chance of receiving sufficient nourishment. The parents’ only option was to leave their children where people with food might notice and take them in.

The chairman of All-China Women's Federation Kang Keqing asked Ulanhu the first Secretary of the CPC Inner Mongolia Committee and chairman of Inner Mongolia, whether the Inner Mongolia could possibly get some of the grasslands to donate milk powder. After Ulanhu met with the prime minister, Zhou Enlai, he decided to receive all of the orphans from Shanghai. His own daughter also assisted him with this work. Once they arrived, the Shanghai orphans in Inner Mongolia were called 'the State's children'.

All the orphans had documents from both their life in Shanghai and their life after they transferred to their herdsmen foster parents in Xilin Gol League, Inner Mongolia. However, these records were all destroyed in the "Cultural Revolution".
