= Fang Weiyi =

Chinese artist (1585–1668)

Fang Weiyi (1585-1668, 方維儀), was a Chinese poet, calligrapher, painter and literature historian.

== Biography ==
Fang Weiyi was the daughter of the landowner and aristocrat courtier Fang Dahzen (d. 1629). Her sister Fang Mengshi, and her female cousin Fang Weize, were also to be known as poets. At age seventeen, she married Yao Sunqi (d. 1602) and had a daughter, but within the year, both her husband and daughter died. She returned to her family, where she assisted her sister-in-law in raising her nephew, the philosopher Fang Yizhi (d. 1671). Afterwards, both she and her sister, who had also been widowed, lived together in their parents' home, and some of their poems reflect these experiences of widowhood, such as in Fang Weiyi's poem "Sorrows of the Heart".

She was a skilled calligrapher, and known as a landscape painter. As a poet, she was known for her mastery of all forms, which she used to describe the contemporary political and social instability, as well as more personal subjects of sorrow and loss.

She published three anthologies of literature focused on female writers; her works included the Gonggui-shishi (History of Poetry in Palace and Boudoir). She also published a work about women's role in Confucianism. She and her sister were long referred to as ideal Confucian women role models by Confucians. This was however somewhat of a paradox, as the Confucian female ideal was a woman who did not, participate in public debate, but restricted themselves to the domestic sphere - very unlike Fang Weiyi's character.
