= 1995 Shanghai International Film Festival =

Chinese film festival

The 2nd Shanghai International Film Festival was held between October 28 and November 12, 1995. The festival marked the 90 year anniversary of the first ever Chinese film, 1905's Dingjun Mountain. 232 films from 46 countries participated in the Festival, 19 of which were officially selections for competition. Swiss director Wolfgang Panzer's Broken Silence won the Golden Goblet for best film.

== Jury ==
- Sun Daolin (China)
- Lee Hsing (Taiwan)
- Jacqueline Andere (Mexico)
- Jean Becker (France)
- Krzysztof Zanussi (Poland)
- Manfred Durniok (Germany)
- Stanislav Rostotsky (Russia)

== In competition ==
Title	Director	Country
1942: A Love Story	Vidhu Vinod Chopra	India
American Daughter	Karen Shakhnazarov	Russia
Belmonte, Bullfighter	Juan Sebastián Bollaín	Spain
Blackbirds at Bangpleng	Niratisai Kanjareuk	Thailand
Broken Silence	Wolfgang Panzer	Switzerland
Coffee with Lemon	Leonid Gorovets	Israel
Crows	Dorota Kędzierzawska	Poland
Eggs	Bent Hamer	Norway
Goodbye for Tomorrow	Nobuhiko Obayashi	Japan
A Feast at Midnight	Justin Hardy	United Kingdom
House of Fire	Juan Bautiste Stagnaro	Argentina
Les Milles	Sébastien Grall	France
O Quatrilho	Fábio Barreto	Brazil
The Piano in the Winter	Kum Whan Jo	South Korea
Red Cherry	Ye Daying	People's Republic of China
Signs of Fire	Luis Filipe Rocha	Portugal
A Walk in the Clouds	Alfonso Arau	United States
White Lies	Mats Arehn	Sweden

== Awards ==
=== Golden Goblet ===
- Best Film - Broken Silence (dir. Wolfgang Panzer, Switzerland)
- Best Director - Erik Clausen for Carl, My Childhood Symphony (Denmark)
- Best Actor - Jean-Pierre Marielle for Les Milles (France)
- Best Actress - Guo Keyu for Red Cherry (China)

=== Special Jury Award ===
- House of Fire (dir. Juan Bautista Stagnaro, Argentina)
- American Daughter (dir. Karen Shakhnazarov, Russia)
