= Daliao =

Daliao may refer to:

- Daliao District, Kaohsiung, Taiwan
- Daliao metro station
- Daliao Village (大寮村), Dahu, Miaoli
- Daliao River, a major river system in Liaoning, China
- Daliao Village (大蓼村), Wushu Township
