= Cookies (film) =

- Directed by: Joël Séria
- Screenplay by: Joël Séria
- Produced by: Eric Geiger
- Starring: Jean-Pierre Marielle
- Cinematography: Marcel Combes
- Edited by: Etiennette Muse
- Music by: Philippe Sarde
- Color process: Eastmancolor
- Distributed by: Compagnie Française de Distribution Cinématographique
- Release date: 20 August 1975
- Running time: 105 minutes
- Country: France
- Language: French
- Budget: FRF 2 million

Cookies (French: Les Galettes de Pont-Aven, "The Galettes of Pont-Aven") is a French drama film directed by Joël Séria.

== Plot ==
Henri Serin (Jean-Pierre Marielle) is a middle-aged travelling umbrella salesman from Saumur who lives a sexless and unhappy married life with his puritan wife (Gisèle Grimm) and two children. Painting is the only true passion of Henri but he also has an affection for female buttocks. One night, on the roads of Brittany he hits a boar with his car. Émile (Bernard Fresson), a rude and carefree painter who lives in a cottage near Riec-sur-Belon meets Henri and invites him to stay at his house while the car is being fixed. Henri falls in love with Émile's Canadian live-in girlfriend Angela (Dolores McDonough) who draws Henri's attention with her beautiful buttocks. Henri and Angela leave Émile after a violent confrontation and move to Pont-Aven, 'the city of painters'. Angela encourages Henri to continue his life as a painter and he sees this as an opportunity to leave his earlier life behind. However, one day Angela suddenly leaves him and disappears, and Henri becomes a drunkard, butt of jokes in the town, and a painter unable to sell a single painting. Marie (Jeanne Goupil), the teenage maid working at the pension Henri stays, is apparently in love with him but he seems to neglect her because his mind is too occupied with Angela. However, at a kermesse where the two sing Kenavo by Théodore Botrel, Henri faces his true feelings for Marie. He finds pure love and a pair of beautiful buttocks in her and decides to make a new start in his life. Eventually, Henri and Marie begin to live together and are seen happily selling galettes and toffee apples on a Névez beach.

== Cast ==
- Jean-Pierre Marielle as Henri Serin
- Claude Piéplu as Monsieur Loyan, the pilgrim
- Romain Bouteille as the monk
- Jeanne Goupil as Marie Guédèc
- Dolores McDonough as Angela
- Andréa Ferréol as Madame Liquois
- Bernard Fresson as Émile
- Martine Ferrière as the pilgrim's sister
- Gisèle Grimm as Madame Serin
- Dominique Lavanant as Marie Pape
- Nathalie Drivet as Ida
- Agnès Van Waerbeke as the naked girl

== Accolades ==
Year	Award	Category	Recipient	Result
1976	César Award	Best Actor	Jean-Pierre Marielle	Nominated
1976	César Award	Best Supporting Actress	Andréa Ferréol	Nominated
