= Chinese virus (politics) =

Political terminology

In international political science, the term Chinese virus refers to a critical perspective on China's influence. This concept was first introduced by He Pin, president of the Mirror Media Group, in 2015 during a hearing of the United States' Congressional-Executive Commission on China. He used this term to describe the potential negative impact of China's expanding influence on a global scale. Some consider this term to be part of the China threat theory, reflecting concerns about China's diplomatic strategies, economic influence, and cultural outreach. The term also carries an anti-communist sentiment.

== Definition ==
This view holds that although the People's Republic of China has put forward the slogan of peaceful rise and emphasized that China will not conduct military operations or interfere in the internal affairs of other countries, the Chinese model has invaded Western society through money diplomacy and economic power, corrupted Western values, and caused the degradation of human rights and world civilization. Some of this is reflected in the fact that foreign governments and companies, intimidated by China's strong economic strength, choose to succumb to diplomacy and values, which in turn further inspires the People's Republic of China to promote the so-called "China model", further threatening world order and stability.

== History ==
As early as when the People's Republic of China was established in 1949, Western countries generally had doubts about the People's Republic of China, fearing that it would join the Eastern Bloc to implement socialist public ownership and threaten the autonomy of schools and trade unions. This view was basically established after the Korean War. Since then, relations between Western countries and the People's Republic of China have been frozen for twenty years. During this period, the People's Republic of China has repeatedly "exported revolution" abroad and planned to overthrow local governments and establish communist regimes. After Nixon's visit to China in 1972 and the establishment of diplomatic relations between the two countries in 1979, China abandoned its policy of exporting revolution, and was once again considered a cornerstone of regional stability.

In 2008, American journalist Richard Behar used the metaphor of the human parasite Entamoeba in a long report on China's economic expansion in Africa - the parasite invades the human body and causes the human immune system to malfunction. People do not feel any discomfort at first, but by the time they feel unwell, it is already a big problem. In Behar's view, China's economic constraints on Taiwan are similar to its economic assistance to Africa and its economic expansion in Africa (but Behar also admits that while China is expanding its economy in Africa, it has also provided African countries with large amounts of economic development assistance that other countries cannot or are unwilling to provide).

On June 3, 2015, He Pin participated in a hearing of the United States's Congressional-Executive Commission on China and first proposed the concept of the Chinese virus. On August 21, he was interviewed by Voice of America reporter Qi Zhifeng, who analyzed his argument in more detail.

== Opinion ==
Mirror Media Group founder He Pin believes that China today is a mixture of the Chinese Communist Party (CCP)'s dictatorship, socialist totalitarianism and capitalist greed. The United States has long pursued a strategy of allying with China to contain Russia. On the one hand, the United States hopes to support China's human rights progress, and on the other hand, it hopes to cooperate with the Chinese government and maintain good relations. He believes that Western countries have also participated in the creation of the Chinese virus. Western countries thought that reform and opening up would bring political openness and democracy to China, but the result was that the economic power cultivated by economic openness became the capital for the CCP to consolidate its dictatorship. Western technology has often become a tool for the CCP to control the people and a weapon against the outside world.

Columbia University visiting professor and legal scholar Zhang Boshu called the "Chinese virus" China's "evil soft power" and "negative energy soft power." He believes that since the 18th National Congress of the Chinese Communist Party, the party-state rulers have been trying to achieve the rejuvenation of the party-state and plan a new domestic and foreign policy structure. In the process, a new structure is being formed. This structure can be attributed to the combination of the party-state system and the nation-state. It may have world historical significance and embodies a new stage of historical evolution.

Apple Daily columnist Li Yi believes that Hong Kong has become the first target of the "Chinese virus". Due to economic difficulties, the Western world is losing its immunity to the "Chinese virus" and is becoming more utilitarian and accommodating to evil. The latest example is that during Xi Jinping's visit, the UK gave up criticizing the CCP on human rights issues for economic interests.

Many diplomats of the People's Republic of China have expressed that the China threat theory represented by the "Chinese virus" is a manifestation of the West's lack of confidence in its democratic system.

== See also ==
- China's peaceful rise
- Red Scare
- Yellow Peril
