= Fang Yizhi =

Qing dynasty person CBDB = 54996

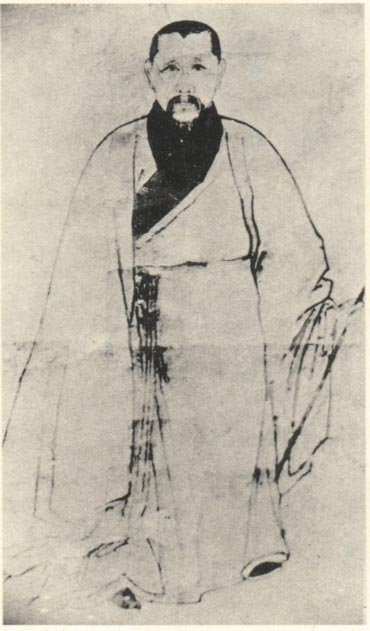
- Born: 1611; South Zhili, Tongcheng County, Ming Dynasty
- Died: November 9, 1671 (aged 59–60); Jiangxi, Wan'an County
- Education: Hanlin Academy review
- Family: Fang Dazhen (ancestor); Fang Kongzhen (father)

Fang Yizhi (Chinese: 方以智, as a politician: Mi Zhi, Man Gong, Lu Qi, Long Mian Yuzhe, as a monk: Dazhi, Wu Wu, Hongzhi, Yao Monk Di, 1611 – November 9, 1671) is a Chinese politician, polymath monk and author of scientific textbooks in the late Ming and Qing Dynasties.

== Early life, family and education ==
Yizhi was born in Tongcheng County, Southern Zhili Province (now Tongcheng City, Anhui Province). His grandfather, Fang Dazhen, once served as the Shaoqing of Dali Temple in the Wanli Dynasty. He contributed to the "Book of Changes" and "Book of Rites" and wrote other notable literary works. His father, Fang Kongzhen, was a Jinshi in the 44th year of Wanli reign (1616), an official in Chongzhen court and governor of Huguang.

Fang Yizhi was noted for being gifted with exceptional wisdom at a young age. He knew literature and history at the age of six and was well-read. In his early years, he traveled with his father as an official to Jiading, Sichuan, Funing, Fujian, Zhili, Yanjing and other places. He saw famous mountains and rivers, interacted with Western missionaries Bi Fangji and Tang Ruowang, and read Western books. Together with Maoxiang, Hou Fangyu and Chen Zhenhui, they are collectively known as the four young masters of the Ming Dynasty.

== Politician career ==
In the seventh year of Chongzhen (1634), there was a civil uprising in Tongcheng. Fang Kongzhen stayed behind, while Fang Yizhi fled to Nanjing with his family. In the twelfth year of Chongzhen (1639), he was elected to the Jimaoke Yingtian Township Examination. In the thirteenth year of Chongzhen (1640), he was awarded the Jinshi title of Lianjie and was awarded the Imperial Academy for review. After Li Zicheng entered Beijing, he was severely tortured. Soon after Li Zicheng defeated in the Shanhaiguan, Fang Yizhi took advantage of the chaos and fled to the south.

== Monk career and later life ==
In the Yongli Dynasty of the Southern Ming Dynasty, he was dismissed from his post due to the case of forged writings except for being an official at the Jingyan Festival. Participated in the anti-Qing activities on his own. After the defeat, he became a monk and changed his name. He was known as the "Medicine Monk". Because of the "Guangdong Case", he was escorted north by the Qing government to Nanchang Provincial Prison, and then to Guangdong to undergo the court hearings in his trial. On October 7, he went to the panic beach in Wan'an, Jiangxi Province. Remembering the deeds of Wen Tianxiang in the late Song Dynasty, he drowned himself in the river.

== Legacy ==
It is said that when he fought against the Qing Dynasty with his wisdom, he promoted the development of the secret society Tiandihui at the bottom of society.

== Education and indoctrination ==
Most of Fang Yizhi's works are sad and touching, such as: "My companions all broke up, and I went into the forest alone in hemp shoes. I changed my surname three times a year, and my heart was crossed. I am used to hearing about conflicts and letters, and I am worried because of the deep wind and rain. Life and death are easy things, The pain is a close friend." ("Going Alone"). Fang Yizhi has made outstanding achievements in philosophy and natural science. He is the author of "Tongya", "Little Knowledge of Physics", "Medicine Di Paozhuang", "Dongxi Jun", "Zen Yuefu", "Four Rhymes Dingben", "Medicine Complete" and so on. Among them, "Tongya" and "Little Knowledge of Physics" are encyclopedic monographs, and the scholar is known as the "unparalleled encyclopedia school in the seventeenth century".

The earliest known paintings are "Four Wonderful Pictures" painted in 1635, as well as "Picture of Cutting the Red Dust", "Picture of Stubborn Stone", "Picture of Riding a Donkey", etc.

Fang Yizhi had a profound family background. While studying Chinese academics, he also learned science and technology from Westerners. He accepted modern Western scientific knowledge but did not follow it blindly. He often verified it through experiments and corrected the mistakes in Western understanding. Fang Yizhi advocated the study of general mathematics and quality testing, and made many achievements in science.

In physics, Fang Yizhi had many original ideas. Starting from the natural view of Qi monism, he proposed a simple light wave theory, saying: "Qi condenses into shape and emits light and sound, and there is still uncondensed air that rubs and breathes with it. Therefore, the function of shape is to stop it. Among them, the use of light and sound always overflows the rest: there is no gap in the air, and they respond to each other." (Volume 1 of "Little Knowledge of Physics") Fang Yizhi believes that the generation of light is due to the stimulation of Qi. Since Qi is diffusely distributed in all spaces without any gaps between each other, the excited Qi must interact with the surrounding stationary Qi, "friction, hissing and inhalation" to transmit the excitement, which forms the propagation of light.

In his "Little Knowledge of Physics", Fang Yizhi recorded a large amount of zoology, botany, cultivation, management and other knowledge. He quoted the missionary's saying that "the brain dominates the mind" and introduced the Western world's knowledge about human bones, muscles, etc., but excluded content such as the missionary's statement that "Almighty God created the world."

Liang Qichao said: "The fifty volumes of Fang Mi's Tongya published in the 15th year of Chongzhen's reign are actually the first book on primary school research in modern times. The style is slightly similar to "Erya", but the categories are slightly increased or decreased"; and Shuo Fang Yizhi's contribution to phonology lies in his proposal of "seeking meaning from sounds".
