= Jean-Pierre Marielle =

French actor (1932–2019)

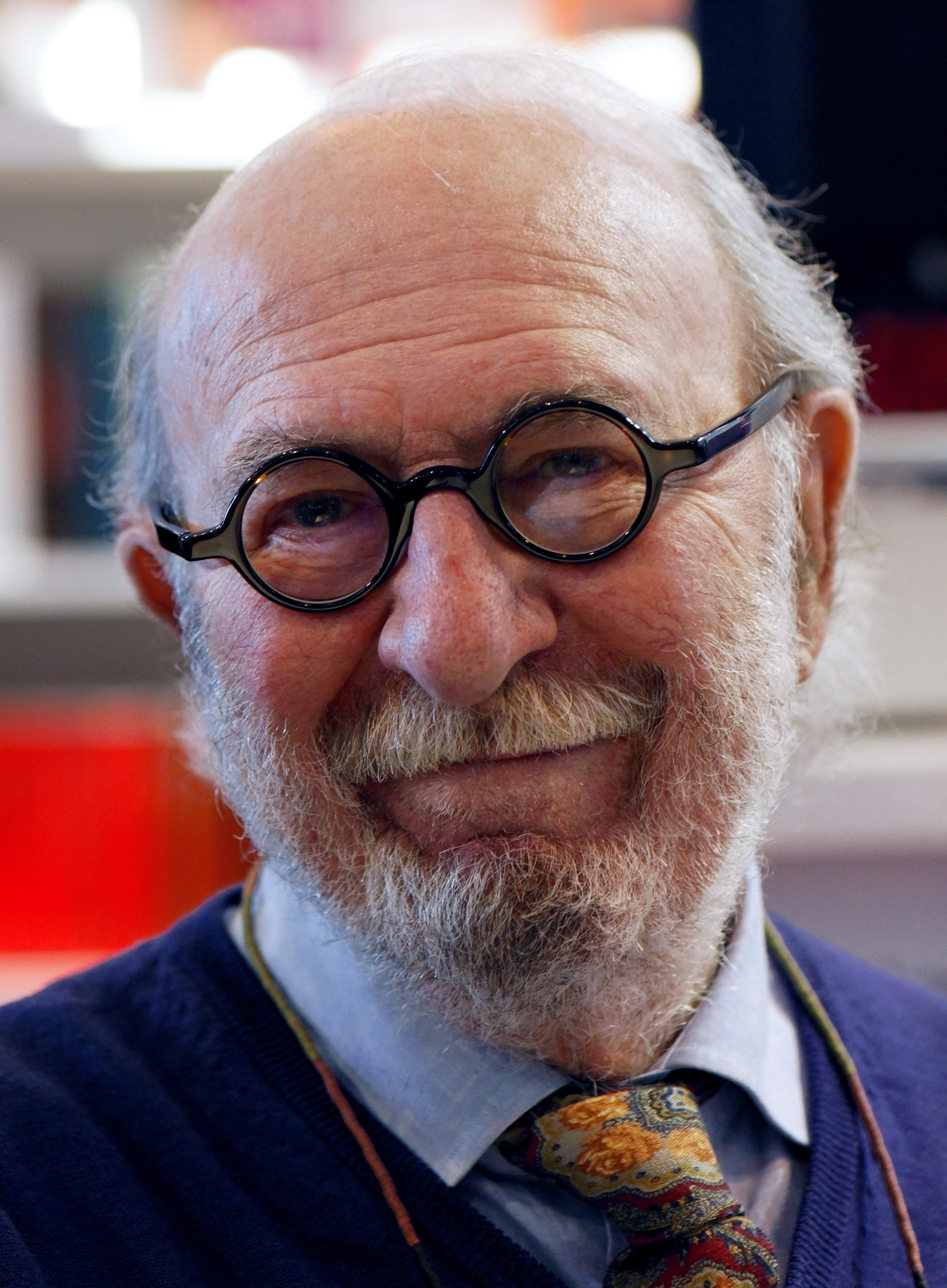
- Marielle in 2011
- Born: 12 April 1932; Paris, France
- Died: 24 April 2019 (aged 87); Saint-Cloud, France
- Occupation: Actor
- Years active: 1957–2016
- Spouse: Agathe Natanson (m. 2003; died 2019)

Jean-Pierre Marielle (French: [ʒɑ̃ pjɛʁ maʁjɛl]; 12 April 1932 – 24 April 2019) was a French actor. He appeared in more than a hundred films in which he played very diverse roles, from a banal citizen (Les Galettes de Pont-Aven), to a World War II hero (Les Milles), to a compromised spy (La Valise), to a has-been actor (Les Grands Ducs), to his portrayal of Jacques Saunière in The Da Vinci Code. He was well known for his distinctive cavernous voice, which is often imitated by French humorists who considered him to be archetypical of the French gentleman.

== Early life ==
Marielle was born in 1932 in Paris to an industrialist father and a dressmaker mother. His first acting experiences dated back to his high school years during which he staged some of Chekhov's plays with his comrades. He initially wanted to study literature but one of his teachers encouraged him to become an actor instead, so that he joined the Conservatoire National where he became close friends with Jean-Paul Belmondo and Jean Rochefort and from where he left with the comedy second prize in 1954.

== Career ==
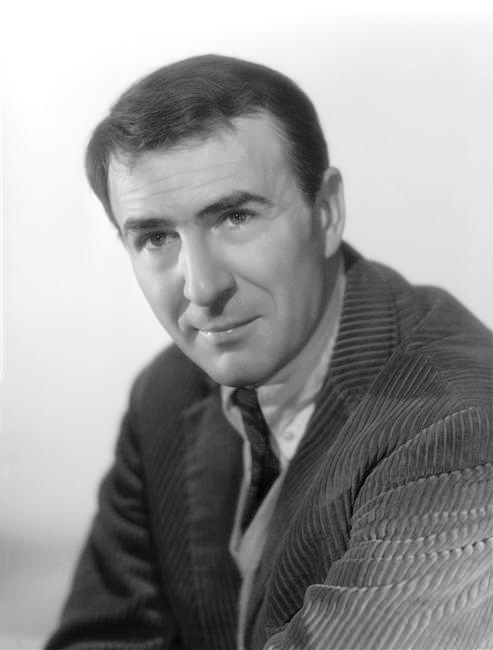
Marielle in 1953

Marielle's early career consisted of stage roles with the Grenier-Hussenot company, notably in Harold Pinter's plays, and some small appearances on the large screen by the late 1950s, with his particular voice giving him the abilities to play older characters. However, disappointed by his first movie roles, he turned to cabaret for a certain time.

He obtained a little more consistent roles in the 1960s in movies such as Faites sauter la banque! (1963), starring alongside Louis de Funès, Weekend at Dunkirk (1964) and in particular Un monsieur de compagnie (1965), where French director Philippe de Broca gave him the opportunity to express all of his talent. But his popularity really exploded during the 1970s as he appeared in a lot of comedies. In La Valise (1974) he played an Israeli spy having to hide in a trunk in order to be extracted from a country in the Middle East. Les Galettes de Pont-Aven (1975), Que la fête commence (1974) and Coup de Torchon (1981) confirmed him as a great actor.

One of his darker performances is his interpretation of a disillusioned and suicidal cop in Les mois d'avril sont meurtriers (1987). The other major role of his career was Monsieur de Sainte-Colombe in Tous les matins du monde (1991).

In parallel he made a brilliant stage career and received the highest French award for a theater actor, the Molière, in 1994. He played Jacques Sauniere in The Da Vinci Code (2006). He was awarded the Légion d'Honneur in 1992.

== Personal life ==
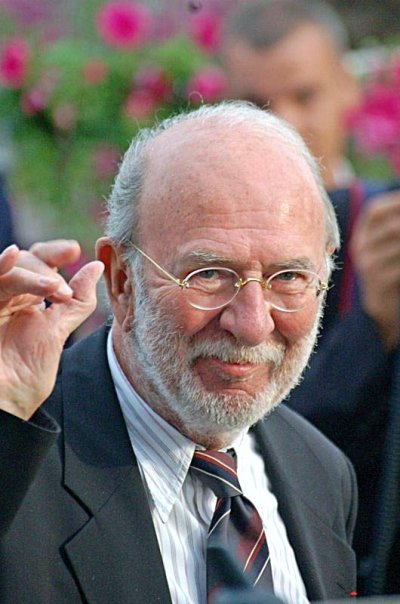
Marielle in 2006

Marielle was married to French actress Agathe Natanson from 4 October 2003 until his death and had a son from a previous union. He was a great fan of jazz music and New York City.

Marielle died on 24 April 2019, at the age of 87.

== Awards ==
- 1995 : Golden Goblet Award for Best Actor (2nd Shanghai International Film Festival) for the film Les Milles.
- 1992 : 7 d'Or Award for Best Actor for the TV film La controverse de valladolid.
- 1987 : Mystfest Award for Best Actor for the film Les mois d'avril sont meurtriers.
- 2008 : Honorary Lumière Awards (13th Lumière Awards)

== Nominations ==
- 2004 – César Award for Best Actor in a Supporting Role for the film La Petite Lili.
- 1993 – César Award for Best Actor in a Supporting Role for the film Max et Jérémie.
- 1992 – César Award for Best Actor for the film Tous les matins du monde.
- 1989 – César Award for Best Actor in a Supporting Role for the film Quelques jours avec moi.
- 1982 – César Award for Best Actor in a Supporting Role for the film Coup de Torchon.
- 1976 – César Award for Best Actor for the film Les Galettes de Pont-Aven.

== Filmography ==
Year	Title	Role	Director	Notes
1957	Le grand bluff	Philippe Norbert	Patrice Dally	
1957	Fernand clochard	Pierre Chevalier		
1957	Anyone Can Kill Me	Jérôme	Henri Decoin	
1957	Charming Boys	The Deauville's receptionist	Henri Decoin (2)	
1958	La fille de la pluie	Xavier de la Mauge	Jean Prat	TV movie
1960	Les trois soeurs	Toujenbach	Jean Prat (2)	TV movie
1960	La papesse		René Lucot	TV movie
1960	La brune que voilà	Cauteret	Robert Lamoureux	
1960	Le mouton	The chief of the police headquarters	Pierre Chevalier	
1960	Pierrot la tendresse	Emile	François Villiers	
1960	Les joueurs	Outiechitelny	Marcel Bluwal	TV movie
1961	La caméra explore le temps	Philip IV of France	Stellio Lorenzi	TV series (1 Episode: "Les Templiers")
1962	Climats	Philippe Marcenat	Stellio Lorenzi (2)	
1962	Il est minuit docteur Schweitzer	Doctor Albert Schweitzer	Gilbert Pineau	TV movie
1962	La caméra explore le temps	Louis XIII	Guy Lessertisseur	TV series (1 Episode: "La conjuration de Cinq-Mars")
1962	La nuit des rois	Malvolio	Claude Barma	TV movie
1963	L'inspecteur Leclerc enquête	Michel Duquesnoy	Maurice Cazeneuve	TV series (1 Episode: "Le passé d'une femme")
1963	Sweet and Sour	Monsieur Rakanowsky	Jacques Baratier	
1963	Peau de banane	Paul Reynaldo	Marcel Ophüls	
1964	Faites sauter la banque!	André Durand-Mareuil	Jean Girault	
1964	Dernière enquête de Wens	Jo Adams	Ivan Govar	
1964	Relax Darling	David Kouglov	Jean Boyer	
1964	Échappement libre	Van Houde	Jean Becker	
1964	Les cabinets particuliers	Jacquart	Alain Boudet	TV movie
1964	Male Companion	Balthazar	Philippe de Broca	
1964	Weekend at Dunkirk	Pierson	Henri Verneuil	
1965	La bonne occase	Landrut	Michel Drach	
1965	Cent briques et des tuiles	Justin	Pierre Grimblat	
1966	Monnaie de singe	Raymond Vernet	Yves Robert	
1966	Roger la Honte	Lucien de Noirville	Riccardo Freda	
1966	Tendre Voyou	Bob	Jean Becker (2)	
1967	All Mad About Him	Reverend Father Fouquet	Norbert Carbonnaux	
1968	L'homme à la Buick	The Marquis	Gilles Grangier	
1969	The Devil by the Tail	Jean-Jacques Leroy-Martin	Philippe de Broca (2)	
1969	Quarante-huit heures d'amour	Mazoillac	Jacques Laurent	
1969	Les Femmes	The editor	Jean Aurel	
1970	La perfection des jeunes filles	Narrator	Ulysse Laugier	Short
1970	Les caprices de Marie	Léopold Panneton	Philippe de Broca (3)	
1970	Le pistonné	Le lieutenant Casanova	Claude Berri	
1971	L'amour c'est gai, l'amour c'est triste	Maxime	Jean-Daniel Pollet	
1971	The Married Couple of the Year Two	Narrator	Jean-Paul Rappeneau	Voice, Uncredited
1971	On est toujours trop bon avec les femmes	Mac Cormack	Michel Boisrond	
1971	Without Apparent Motive	Perry Rupert-Foote	Philippe Labro	
1971	Four Flies on Grey Velvet	Gianni Arrosio	Dario Argento	
1972	Sex-shop	Lucien	Claude Berri (2)	
1972	Le Petit Poucet	The Ogre	Michel Boisrond (2)	
1972	P'pa je serai serrurier		Ulysse Laugier (2)	Short, Voice
1973	L'affaire Crazy Capo	Commissioner Martin	Patrick Jamain	
1973	La Valise	Major Bloch	Georges Lautner	
1973	Charlie et ses deux nénettes	Tony	Joël Séria	
1974	Comment réussir quand on est con et pleurnichard	Gérard Malempin	Michel Audiard	
1974	Un linceul n'a pas de poches	Doctor Carlille	Jean-Pierre Mocky	
1974	Dis-moi que tu m'aimes	Richard Le Royer	Michel Boisrond (3)	
1975	The Common Man	Léo Tartaffione	Yves Boisset	
1975	Let Joy Reign Supreme	The marquis de Pontcallec	Bertrand Tavernier	
1975	La traque	Albert Danville	Serge Leroy	
1975	Les Galettes de Pont-Aven	Henri Serin	Joël Séria (2)	Nominated - César Award for Best Actor
1976	Calmos	Paul Dufour	Bertrand Blier	
1976	On aura tout vu	Morlock	Georges Lautner (2)	
1976	Cours après moi que je t'attrape	Paul	Robert Pouret	
1976	Sturmtruppen	Salvatore Samperi	Salvatore Samperi	
1977	The More It Goes, the Less It Goes	Inspector Pignon	Michel Vianey	
1977	Comme la lune	Pouplard	Joël Séria (3)	
1977	The Accuser	Roustev	Jean-Louis Bertuccelli	
1977	Un moment d'égarement	Pierre	Claude Berri (3)	
1979	Cause toujours... tu m'intéresses!	François Perrin	Édouard Molinaro	
1980	L'entourloupe	Castelard	Gérard Pirès	
1980	Voulez-vous un bébé Nobel?	Victor Delacroix	Robert Pouret (2)	
1981	Asphalte	Albert Pourrat	Denis Amar	
1981	Pétrole! Pétrole!	Jean-Marie Tardel	Christian Gion	
1981	Coup de Torchon	Georges Le Peron	Bertrand Tavernier (2)	Nominated - César Award for Best Supporting Actor
1982	Emmenez-moi au théâtre: L'étrangleur s'excite	Gene Cornflakes	Alexandre Tarta	TV movie
1982	L'indiscrétion	Daniel	Pierre Lary	
1982	Jamais avant le mariage	Patrick Le Kermadec	Daniel Ceccaldi	
1983	Signes extérieurs de richesse	Jérôme Bouvier	Jacques Monnet	
1984	...e la vita continua	Arnoldo Betocchi	Dino Risi	TV movie
1984	Les capricieux	Simon	Michel Deville	TV movie
1984	Partenaires	Gabriel Gallien	Claude d'Anna	
1985	L'amour en douce	Antoine Garnier	Édouard Molinaro (2)	
1985	Hold-Up	Simon Labrosse	Alexandre Arcady	
1986	Tenue de soirée	The Rich and Depressed Man	Bertrand Blier (2)	
1987	Les mois d'avril sont meurtriers	Fred	Laurent Heynemann	Mystfest - Best Actor
1987	Les idiots	Kubac	Jean-Daniel Verhaeghe	TV movie
1987	Les 2 crocodiles	René Boutancard	Joël Séria (4)	
1988	Un château au soleil	Artus de Montdeny	Robert Mazoyer	TV Mini-Series
1988	A Few Days with Me	Monsieur Fonfrin	Claude Sautet	Nominated - César Award for Best Supporting Actor
1989	Bouvard et Pecuchet	François Bouvard	Jean-Daniel Verhaeghe (2)	TV movie
1990	Six crimes sans assassins	Commissioner Bastien Darnancourt	Bernard Stora	TV movie
1990	Clérambard	The Count Hector de Clérambard	Marcel Bluwal (2)	TV movie
1990	Uranus	Archambaud	Claude Berri (4)	
1991	Tous les Matins du Monde	Monsieur de Sainte-Colombe	Alain Corneau	Nominated - César Award for Best Actor
1992	La controverse de Valladolid	Bartolomé de las Casas	Jean-Daniel Verhaeghe (3)	TV movie 7 d'Or - Best Actor
1992	Max & Jeremie	Almeida	Claire Devers	Nominated - César Award for Best Supporting Actor
1993	1, 2, 3, Sun	The lonely man	Bertrand Blier (3)	
1994	Le parfum d'Yvonne	Dr. Rene Meinthe	Patrice Leconte	
1994	Le Sourire	Pierre-François Le Clainche	Claude Miller	
1995	Les Milles	Commander Perrochon	Sébastien Grall	Golden Goblet Award for Best Actor
1996	Les Grands Ducs	Georges Cox	Patrice Leconte (2)	
1996	L'élève	Armand	Olivier Schatzky	
1999	One 4 All	Commissioner Bayard	Claude Lelouch	
2000	Les Acteurs	Himself	Bertrand Blier (4)	
2001	Madame De...	The general	Jean-Daniel Verhaeghe (4)	TV movie
2003	Le nouveau testament	Jean Marcelin	Yves Di Tullio; Bernard Murat	TV movie
2003	Little Lili	Simon Marceaux	Claude Miller (2)	Nominated - César Award for Best Supporting Actor
2004	Tomorrow We Move	Popernick	Chantal Akerman	
2004	Pride	James's voice	John Downer	TV movie
2004	Atomik Circus - Le retour de James Bataille	Bosco	Didier & Thierry Poiraud	
2005	Galilée ou L'amour de Dieu	Pope Barberini	Jean-Daniel Verhaeghe (5)	TV movie
2005	Grey Souls	Pierre-Ange Destinat	Yves Angelo	
2006	The Da Vinci Code	Jacques Saunière	Ron Howard	
2006	Le Grand Meaulnes	M. de Galais	Jean-Daniel Verhaeghe (6)	
2007	Let's Dance	Salomon Bellinsky	Noémie Lvovsky	Nominated - César Award for Best Actor; Nominated - Globes de Cristal Award for Best Actor
2007	Ce que mes yeux ont vu	Jean Dussart	Laurent de Bartillat	
2008	Livrez-nous Grynszpan	Narrator	Joël Calmettes	TV movie
2008	Elles et Moi	Emile de Montellier	Bernard Stora (2)	TV Mini-Series (1 Episode)
2009	Micmacs	Placard	Jean-Pierre Jeunet	
2009	Darwin (r)évolution	Charles Darwin	Philippe Tourancheau	TV movie
2010	Pièce montée	Victor	Denys Granier-Deferre	
2010	The Skin of Sorrow	Oswald	Alain Berliner	TV movie
2010	Santa's Apprentice		Luc Vinciguerra	Voice
2010	Le mystère	Octave	Jean-Teddy Filippe	
2011	Bouquet final	Jean-Pierre	Josée Dayan	TV movie
2011	Chez Maupassant	Sosthène	Gérard Jourd'hui	TV series (1 Episode : "Mon oncle Sosthène")
2012	Nos retrouvailles	The psychoanalyst	Josée Dayan (2)	TV movie
2012	Rondo	Abraham	Olivier van Malderghem	
2012	Les seigneurs	Titouan Leguennec	Olivier Dahan	
2012	Max	Nick	Stéphanie Murat	
2012	La fleur de l'âge	Hubert Dassonville	Nick Quinn	
2013	Indiscrétions	Bernard Lefort	Josée Dayan (3)	TV movie
2014	The Missionaries	Himself	Tonie Marshall	
2014	Des roses en hiver	Jean	Lorenzo Gabriele	TV movie
2014	Do Not Disturb	Michel's father	Patrice Leconte	
2016	Phantom Boy	L'homme au visage cassé	Jean-Loup Felicioli and Alain Gagnol	Voice
2016	Capitaine Marleau	Frantz Meyer	Josée Dayan (4)	TV series (1 Episode)
