= Zhu De =

Chinese general and politician (1886–1976)

Marshal Zhu De
- 朱德
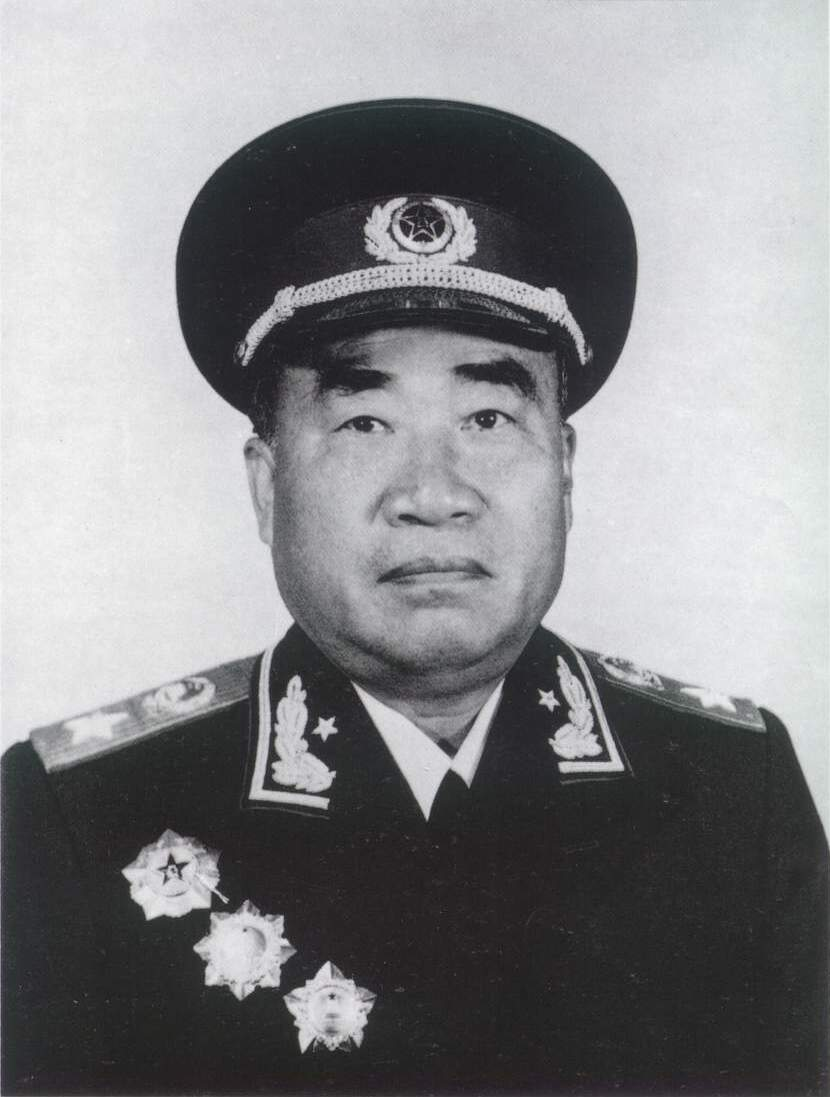
- Portrait, 1955

2nd Chairman of the Standing Committee of the National People's Congress
- In office 28 April 1959 – 6 July 1976
- President: Liu Shaoqi; None (Post abolished in 1975)
- Preceded by: Liu Shaoqi
- Succeeded by: Soong Ching-ling (acting)

1st Vice Chairman of China
- In office 27 September 1954 – 27 April 1959
- Chairman: Mao Zedong
- Succeeded by: Soong Ching-ling and Dong Biwu

Vice Chairman of the Chinese Communist Party
- In office 28 September 1956 – 1 August 1966
- Chairman: Mao Zedong

Secretary of the Central Commission for Discipline Inspection
- In office 9 November 1949 – 31 March 1955
- Preceded by: Li Weihan
- Succeeded by: Dong Biwu

Commander-in-Chief of the People's Liberation Army
- In office 28 November 1946 – 27 September 1954
- Preceded by: Post established
- Succeeded by: Post abolished Mao Zedong (as of CMC Chairman)

Personal details
- Born: 1 December 1886 Yilong County, Nanchong, Sichuan, China
- Died: 6 July 1976 (aged 89) Beijing, China
- Party: Chinese Communist Party (1925–1976)
- Spouses: Xiao Jufang (m. 1912; died 1916) Chen Yuzhen (m. 1916; died 1935) Wu Ruolan (m. 1928; died 1929) Kang Keqing (m. 1929)
- Children: Zhu Qi; Zhu Min
- Education: Yunnan Military Academy
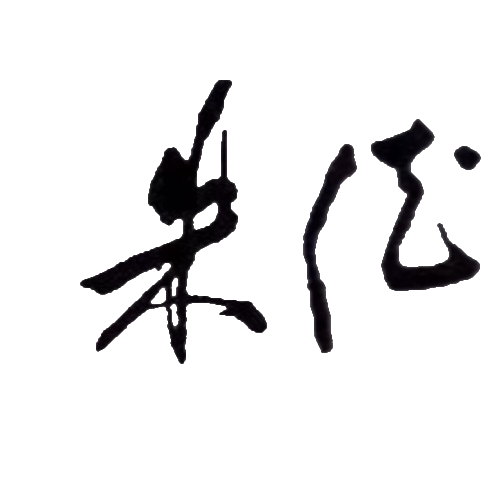
- Signature
- Nicknames: "Old Chief Zhu"; "The Father of the Red Army"; "Red Napoleon of China"

Military service
- Allegiance: Republic of China; People's Republic of China
- Branch/service: People's Liberation Army Ground Force; Eighth Route Army; Chinese Workers' and Peasants' Red Army; National Revolutionary Army; Yunnan clique
- Years of service: 1927–1976
- Rank: Marshal of the People's Republic of China; General of the National Revolutionary Army, Republic of China
- Battles/wars: Northern Expedition; Chinese Civil War; Encirclement campaigns; Long March; Second Sino-Japanese War; Hundred Regiments Offensive

Chinese name
- Chinese: 朱德
Transcriptions
Standard Mandarin
- Hanyu Pinyin: Zhū Dé
- Wade–Giles: Chu Teh
- IPA: Mandarin pronunciation: [tʂú tĕ]

Courtesy name: Yujie
- Simplified Chinese: 朱玉阶
- Traditional Chinese: 朱玉階
Transcriptions
Standard Mandarin
- Hanyu Pinyin: Zhū Yùjiē
- Wade–Giles: Chu Yu-chieh
- IPA: Mandarin pronunciation: [tʂú ŷ.tɕjé]

Zhu De (Note: Chinese: 朱德; pinyin: Zhū Dé; Wade–Giles: Chu Teh; /ˈdʒuː ˈdʌ/) (1 December 1886 – 6 July 1976) was a Chinese general, military strategist, politician and revolutionary in the Chinese Communist Party (CCP).

Zhu was born into poverty and was adopted by a wealthy uncle at age nine and received a superior early education that led to his admission into a military academy. After graduating, he joined a rebel army and became a warlord. After that, he joined the CCP (Chinese Communist Party). He commanded the Eighth Route Army during the Second Sino-Japanese War and the Chinese Civil War. By the end of the civil war, he was also a high-ranking party official.

Zhu is regarded as one of the principal founders of the People's Republic of China, and was a prominent political figure until dying in 1976. In 1955, he was ranked first among the ten marshals. He was chairman of the Standing Committee of the National People's Congress from 1959 to 1976.

== Biography ==
=== Early life ===
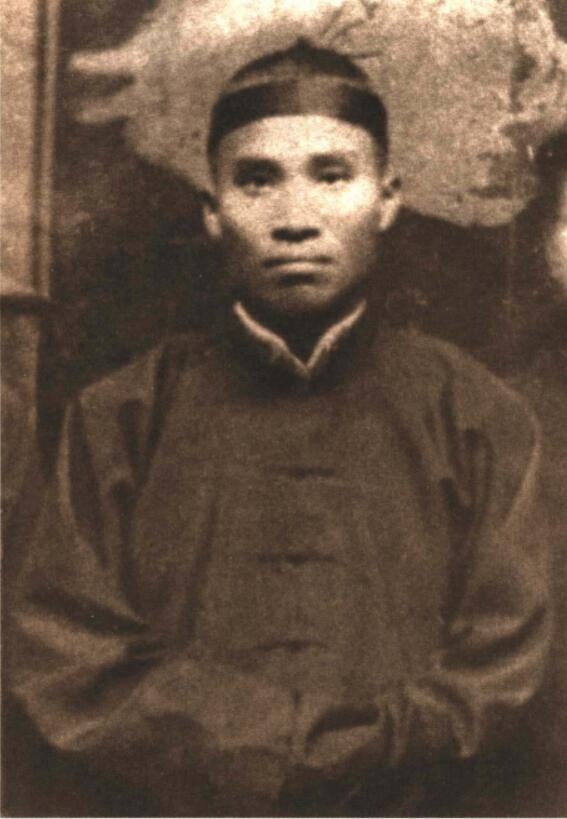
Zhu during his youth (1900)

Zhu was born on 1 December 1886, to a poor tenant farmer's family in Hung, a town in Yilong County, Nanchong. Of the 15 children born to the family, only eight survived. His family of Hakkas in Sichuan migrated from Hunan province and Guangdong province. His origins are often given as Hakka, but Agnes Smedley's biography of him says his people came from Guangdong and speaks of Hakka as merely associates of his. She also says that older generations of his family had spoken the "Kwangtung dialect" (which would be close to but probably different from modern Cantonese), and that his generation also spoke Sichuanese, a distinct regional variant of Southwestern Mandarin that is unintelligible to other speakers of Standard Chinese (Mandarin).

Despite his family's poverty, by pooling resources, Zhu was chosen to be sent to a regional private school in 1892. At age nine, he was adopted by his prosperous uncle, whose political influence allowed him to gain access to Yunnan Military Academy. He enrolled in a Sichuan high school around 1907 and graduated in 1908. Subsequently, he returned to Yilong's primary school as a gym instructor. An advocate of modern science and political teaching rather than the strict classical education afforded by schools, he was dismissed from his post and entered the Yunnan Military Academy in Kunming. There he joined the Beiyang Army and the Tongmenghui secret political society (the forerunner of the Kuomintang).

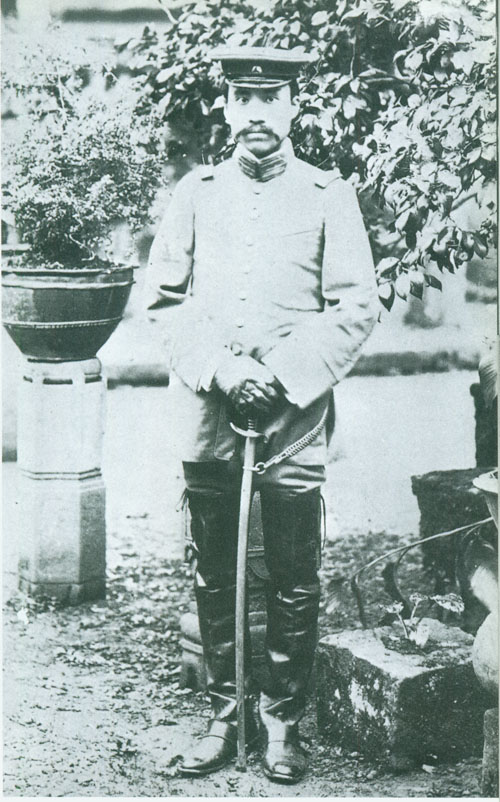
Zhu De in 1916

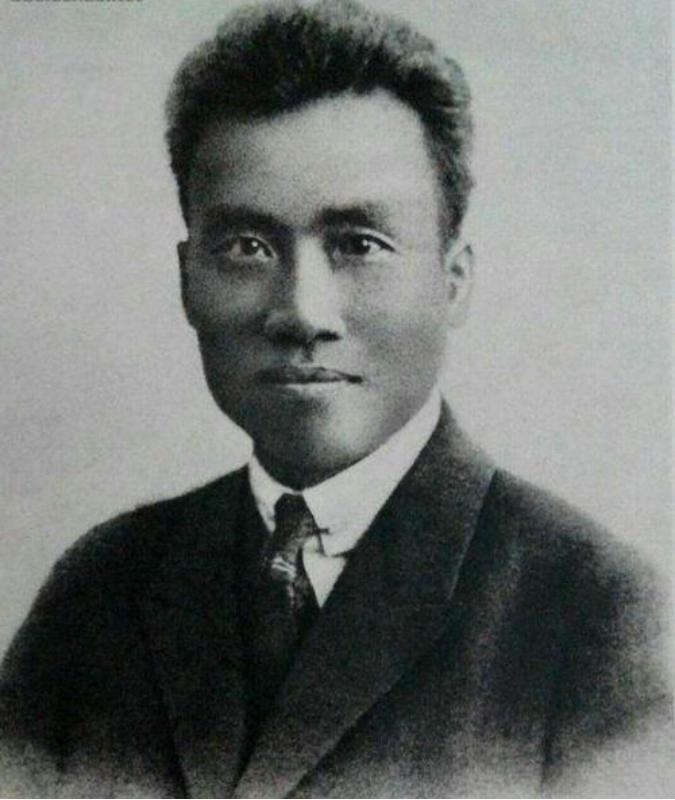
Zhu photographed in Berlin, 1922

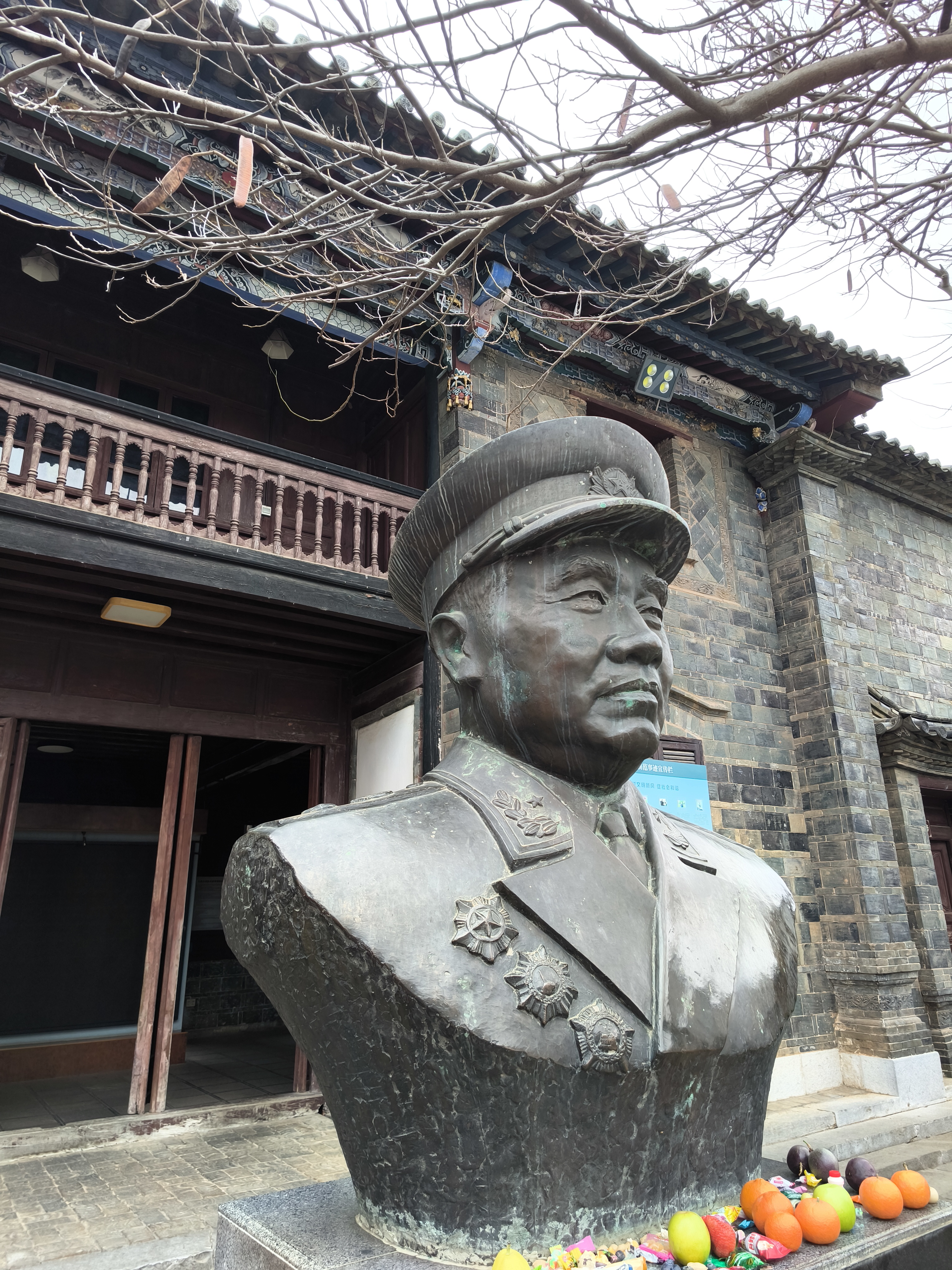
Bust of Zhu De at his former residence in Jianshu

=== Nationalism and warlordism ===
At the Yunnan Military Academy in Kunming, he first met Cai E (Tsai Ao). He taught at the academy after his graduation in July 1911. Siding with the revolutionary forces after the 1911 Revolution, he joined Brig. Cai E in the October 1911 expeditionary force that marched on Qing forces in Sichuan. He served as a regimental commander in the campaign to unseat Yuan Shikai in 1915–16. When Cai became governor of Sichuan after Yuan's death in June 1916, Zhu was made a brigade commander.

Following the death of his mentor Cai E and of his first wife Xiao Jufang in 1916, Zhu developed a severe opium habit that afflicted him for several years until 1922, when he underwent treatment in Shanghai. His troops continued to support him, and so he consolidated his forces to become a warlord once again. In 1920, after his troops were driven from Sichuan toward the Tibetan border, he returned to Yunnan as a public security commissioner of the provincial government. Around this time, he decided to leave China for study in Europe. He first traveled to Shanghai, where he broke his opium habit and, according to historians of the Kuomintang, met Sun Yat-sen. He attempted to join the Chinese Communist Party in early 1922, but was rejected for being a warlord.

=== Converting to Communism ===
In late 1922 Zhu went to Berlin, along with his partner He Zhihua. He resided in Germany until 1925, studying at one point at Göttingen University. Here, he met Zhou Enlai, as well as being expelled from Germany for his role in a number of student protests. Around this time, he joined the Chinese Communist Party; Zhou Enlai was one of his sponsors (having sponsors being a condition of probationary membership, the stage before full membership). In July 1925, after being expelled from Germany, he traveled to the Soviet Union to study military affairs and Marxism at the Communist University of the Toilers of the East. While in Moscow, He Zhihua gave birth to his only daughter, Zhu Min. Zhu returned to China in July 1926 to unsuccessfully persuade Sichuan warlord Yang Sen to support the Northern Expedition.

In 1927, following the collapse of the First United Front, Kuomintang authorities ordered Zhu to lead a force against Zhou Enlai and Liu Bocheng's Nanchang uprising. Having helped orchestrate the uprising, Zhu and his army defected from the Kuomintang. The uprising failed to gather support, however, and Zhu was forced to flee Nanchang with his army. Under the false name of Wang Kai, Zhu managed to find shelter for his remaining forces by joining warlord Fan Shisheng.

=== Zhu-Mao ===
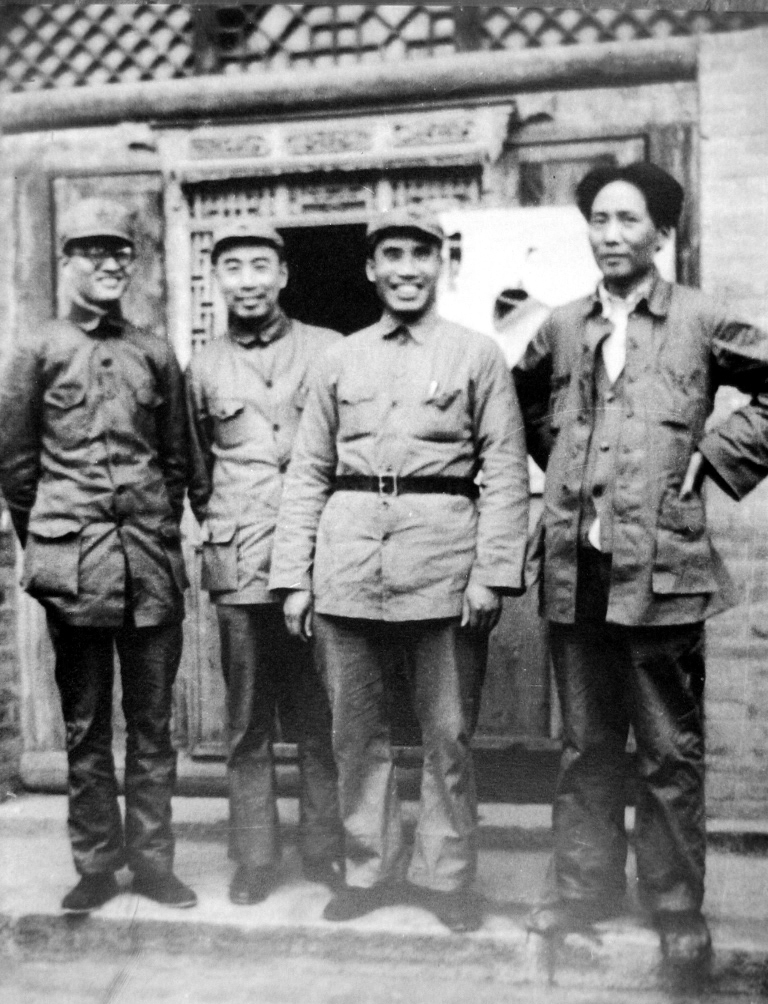
Zhu (second from right) photographed with Mao Zedong, Zhou Enlai (second from left) and Bo Gu (left) in 1937

Zhu's close affiliation with Mao Zedong began in 1928 when, with the help of Chen Yi and Lin Biao, Zhu defected from Fan Shisheng's protection and marched his army of 10,000 men to Jiangxi and the Jinggang Mountains. Here, Mao had formed a soviet in 1927, and Zhu began building up his army into the Red Army, consolidating and expanding the Soviet areas of control. The meeting, which happened on the Longjiang Bridge on 28 April 1928, was facilitated by Mao Zetan, who was Mao's brother serving under Zhu. He carried a letter to his brother Mao Zedong where Zhu stated, "We must unite forces and carry out a well-defined military and agrarian policy." This development became a turning point, with the merged forces forming the "Fourth Red Army", with Zhu being Military Commander and Mao being Party Representative.

Zhu's leadership made him a figure of immense prestige; locals even credited him with supernatural abilities. During this time Mao and Zhu became so closely associated that to the local villagers they were known collectively as "Zhu-Mao." In 1929, Zhu De and Mao Zedong were forced to flee Jinggangshan to Ruijin following military pressure from Chiang Kai-shek. Here, they formed the Jiangxi Soviet. In 1931, Zhu was appointed leader of the Red Army in Ruijin by the CCP leadership. He successfully led a conventional military force against the Kuomintang in the lead-up to the Fourth Counter Encirclement Campaign; however, he was not able to do the same during the Fifth Counter Encirclement Campaign and the CCP's forces fled. Zhu helped form the 1934 break-out that began the Long March.

=== Red Army leader ===
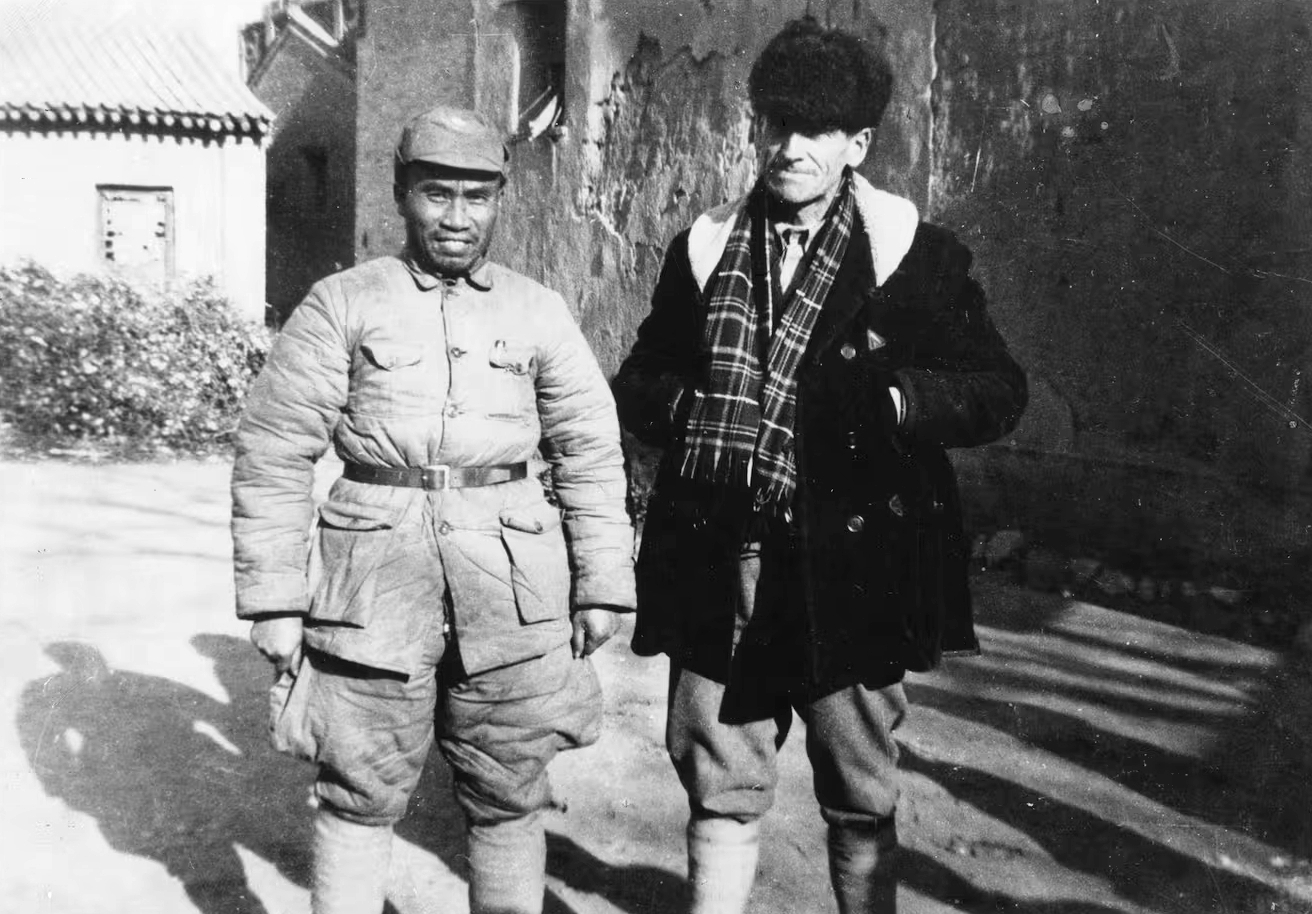
Zhu with American military observer Evans Carlson at the Eighth Route Army's field headquarters in Shanxi province, December 1937

During the Long March, Zhu and Zhou Enlai organized certain battles in tandem. There were few positive effects, since the real power was in the hands of Bo Gu and Otto Braun. In the Zunyi Conference, Zhu supported Mao Zedong's criticisms of Bo and Braun. After the conference, Zhu cooperated with Mao and Zhou on military affairs. In July 1935, Zhu and Liu Bocheng were members of the Fourth Red Army, while Mao Zedong and Zhou Enlai were members of the First Red Army. When separation between the two divisions occurred, Zhu was forced by Zhang Guotao, the leader of Fourth Red Army, to go south. The Fourth Red Army barely survived the retreat through Sichuan province. Arriving in Yan'an, Zhu directed the reconstruction of the Red Army under the political guidance of Mao.

During the Second Sino-Japanese War and the Chinese Civil War, he held the position of Commander-in-Chief of the Red Army and, in 1940, Zhu, alongside Peng Dehuai, devised and organized the Hundred Regiments Offensive. Initially, Mao supported this offensive. While a successful campaign, Mao later attributed it as the main provocation for the devastating Japanese Three Alls policy later and used it to criticize Peng at the Lushan Conference.

In 1944, United States Marine Corps colonel Evans Carlson praised Zhu as "a master of guerilla warfare."

=== Later life ===
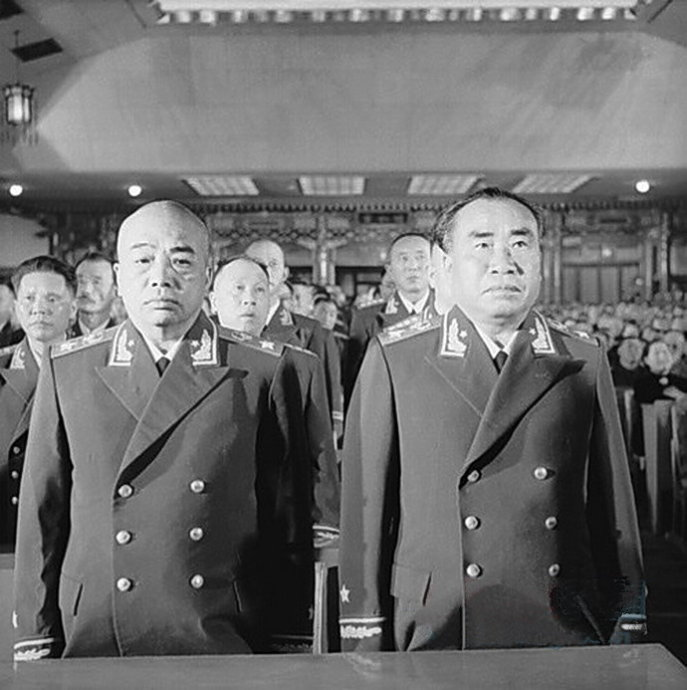
Zhu and Peng Dehuai (left) at the Marshal of the People's Republic of China rank awarding ceremony

In 1949, Zhu was named Commander-in-Chief of the People's Liberation Army (PLA). From November 1949 to May 1955, he served as the first secretary of the Central Commission for Discipline Inspection. Zhu also served as the vice-chairman of the Chinese Communist Party (1956–1966) and vice-chairman of the People's Republic of China (1954–1959). Zhu oversaw the PLA during the Korean War within his authority as Commander-in-Chief. In 1955, he was conferred the rank of marshal. At the Lushan Conference, he tried to protect Peng Dehuai, by giving some mild criticisms of Peng; rather than denouncing him, he merely gently reproved his targeted comrade, who was a target of Mao Zedong. Mao was not satisfied with Zhu De's behavior. After the conference, Zhu was dismissed from vice chairmen of Central Military Commission, not in least part due to his loyalty for the fallen Peng.

In April 1969, during the summit of the Cultural Revolution, Zhu was dismissed from his position on the Politburo Standing Committee of the Chinese Communist Party, and the activity of the National People's Congress was halted. In October 1969, Lin Biao issued a command named "Order Number One", which evacuated important martial figures to distant areas due to the tension between China and Soviet Union, and Zhu De was taken to Guangdong. In 1973 Zhu was reinstated in the Politburo Standing Committee. In 1974, when the imprisoned Peng Dehuai was on his death bed, it was reported that his last wish was to see Zhu, which was ultimately denied by his guards. When Zhu learnt of his wish, he reportedly burst into tears.

He continued to work as a statesman until his death on 6 July 1976. His passing came six months after the death of Zhou Enlai, and just two months before the death of Mao Zedong. Zhu was cremated three days later, and received a funeral several days afterwards.

== Personal life ==
=== Marriage ===
Zhu De married four times, according to the unfinished biography written by Agnes Smedley. However, there is no evidence of his marrying the mother of his only daughter. His known relationships were with:

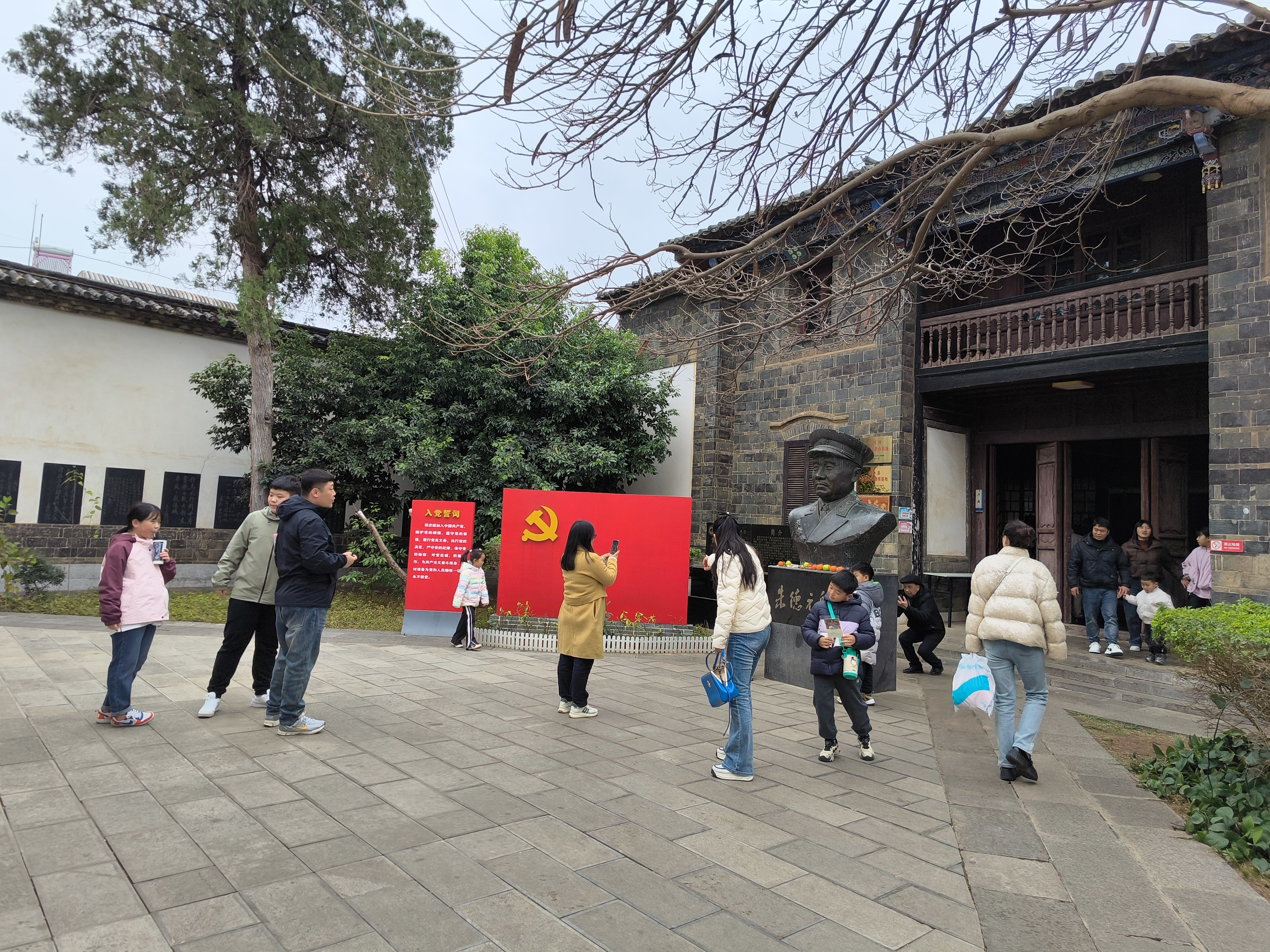
Former residence of Zhu De in Jianshui (2025)

- Xiao Jufang (Chinese: 萧菊芳 or Hsiao Chu-fen). Xiao was a fellow student of Zhu's at Kunming Normal Institute (昆明师范学院). The pair married in 1912. Xiao died of a fever in 1916 after giving birth to Zhu's only son, Baozhu.
- Chen Yuzhen (陈玉珍). After the death of Xiao Jufang, Zhu was advised to find a mother for his infant son. He was introduced to Chen by friends in the military. Chen had participated in revolutionary activities in 1911, as well as in 1916. Chen reportedly set the condition that she would not marry unless her future husband proposed to her in person, which Zhu did. The two married in 1916. Chen looked after the home, even building a study for Zhu and his scholarly friends to meet, which she furnished with pamphlets, books, and manifestos on the Russian October Revolution. In the spring of 1922, Zhu left his home to visit the Sichuanese warlord Yang Sen. According to Agnes Smedley's biography, Zhu considered himself separated from Chen after leaving her and felt free to marry again, though there had been no formal divorce. Chen was killed by the Kuomintang in 1935.
- He Zhihua (贺治华). She met Zhu in Shanghai and followed him to Germany in late 1922.When Zhu was deported from Germany in 1925, she was already pregnant and later gave birth in a village on the outskirts of Moscow. Zhu named the daughter Sixun (四旬), but relations between the two had diminished, and He Zhihua rejected his choice, naming the baby Feifei (菲菲) instead. He Zhihua sent her daughter to live with her sister in Chengdu shortly after the birth. She then married Huo Jiaxin (霍家新) in the same year. He returned to Shanghai in 1928. She reportedly betrayed wanted communists to the Kuomintang, before being blinded in a gun attack by Red Army soldiers that killed her husband. After this, she returned to Sichuan, dying of illness before 1949.
- Wu Ruolan (伍若兰 or Wu Yu-lan). Wu was the daughter of an intellectual from Jiuyantang (九眼塘) in Hunan. Zhu met Wu after attacking Leiyang with the Peasant's and Workers Army. They married in 1928. In January 1929, Zhu and Wu were encircled by Kuomintang troops at a temple in the Jinggang Mountains. Zhu escaped, but Wu was captured. She was executed by decapitation and her head was allegedly sent to Changsha for display.
- Kang Keqing (K'ang K'e-ching or Kang Keh-chin). Zhu married Kang in 1929 when he was 43. She was a member of the Red Army and also a peasant leader. Kang was highly studious and Zhu taught her to read and write before they married. Kang outlived him. Unlike most women who joined the Long March, she did not become part of the propaganda unit marching at the rear. Kang fought by the side of her husband, distinguishing herself as a combat soldier, a markswoman, and a troop leader.

=== Children ===
- Zhu Baozhu (朱保柱) was born in 1916 and later changed his name to Zhu Qi (朱琦). He died in 1974 from illness.
- Zhu Min (朱敏) was born in Moscow in April 1926 to He Zhihua (贺治华). Zhu De named her Sixun (四旬), but she rejected this and choose Feifei (菲菲). He Zhihua sent her daughter to her sister in Chengdu shortly after her birth, where she went by the name He Feifei (贺飞飞). She pursued higher education in Moscow from 1949 to 1953 before teaching at Beijing Normal University. She died of illness in 2009.

== Awards ==
Cambodia
Royal Order of Cambodia (Grand Cross Medal) (1964)

Indonesia
Star of the Republic of Indonesia (2nd Class Medal) (1961)

== Works ==
- Zhu De (1986). Selected Works of Zhu De (1st ed.). Beijing: Foreign Languages Press. ISBN 0-8351-1573-9. Archived from the original on 25 February 2020.

== See also ==
- History of the People's Republic of China (1949–1976)
- List of generals of China
- Outline of the military history of the People's Republic of China

== Notes ==
Political offices
New title	Vice President of the People's Republic of China; 1954–1959	Succeeded by Dong Biwu and Soong Ching-ling
Military offices
New title	Commander-in-Chief of the People's Liberation Army; 1949–1954	Succeeded by Mao Zedong as Chairman of the Central Military Commission
