= Kang Keqing =

Chinese politician and sixth wife of Zhu De (1911–1992)

- 康克清
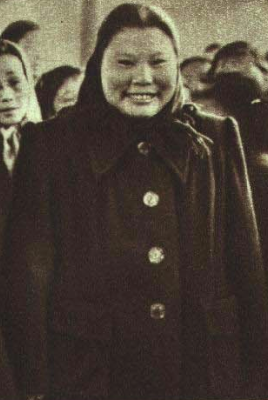
- Kang Keqing in 1952 at the International Convention for the Protection of Children

Spouse of the Head of State of China (de facto) (Note: The position of Chairman of the PRC was officially abolished in 1975 and the functions of head of State were formally transmitted to the chairman of the Standing Committee of the National People's Congress until Song Qingling became Honorary President in 1981.)
- In office 17 January 1975 (Note: Zhu De was re-elected as Chairman of the NPCSC.) – 6 July 1976

Chairperson of the All-China Women's Federation
- In office 1978–1988
- Preceded by: Cai Chang
- Succeeded by: Chen Muhua

Personal details
- Born: Kang Guixiu (Chinese: 康桂秀); 7 September 1911 Wan'an, Jiangxi, Qing China
- Died: 22 April 1992 (aged 80) Beijing, China
- Party: Chinese Communist Party
- Spouse: Zhu De
- Parent: Kang Niangou (Chinese: 康年苟)

Kang Keqing (K'ang K'e-ching; Chinese: 康克清; pinyin: Kāng Kèqīng; September 7, 1911 – April 22, 1992) was a Chinese revolutionary and politician. As a teenager, she joined the Chinese Red Army, fighting with the Chinese Communist Party during the Chinese Civil War and participating in the Long March. She later served as chair of the All-China Women's Federation and served on the Central Committee of the Chinese Communist Party during the 1980s. She was also the wife of general Zhu De until his death in 1976.

== Early life ==
Kang was born to a Hakka fishing family in the township of Luotangwan (Chinese: 罗塘湾乡), Wan'an County, Jiangxi Province. In order to make ends meet, her parents sold five daughters in succession to other families as brides. Kang was given away when she was 40 days old to a tenant farmer called Luo Qigui (Chinese: 罗奇圭). Her future husband had not yet been born at this point and, when the Luo family finally had their child, it was a girl. This child died and Kang was cared for by the Luo family as a daughter; living in a peasant family, Kang was the main source of labour for her adopted parents.

== Revolution ==
In 1924, the Wan'an County Chinese Communist Party member arrived in Kang's village as part of the Northern Expedition and set up various activities to promote revolution, including plays and a night school. The member also promulgated concepts of gender equality and freedom in marriage. At approximately age 14, Kang became a member of the Red Army. She would later promulgate the idea that feudalism, imperialism, and bureaucratic capitalism were the main enemies of the female labourer.

She was elected permanent secretary of the Luotangwan Village Women's Association (Chinese: 罗塘湾乡妇女协会) and was the first local woman to cut her hair short. From this point onwards, Kang took every opportunity to pursue studies that her background had denied her as a child. In 1927, Chiang Kai-shek opposed the Communists and there was violent conflict. Nearly 200 people in Wan'an were killed and, to temper Kang's revolutionary tendencies, her adoptive parents attempted to arrange a marriage for her. Kang left home in September 1928 and joined a guerilla band seeking shelter with the Chinese Red Army.

Agnes Smedley's biography of Zhu describes her as follows:

″Up from the Wanan district to the west came a delegation of Peasant Partisans, and among them was the woman leader Kang. She carried a rifle as if it were a part of her and, like the men, she walked with lithe decision and certainty. A woman in her middle twenties, of medium height and shingled hair, she wore the usual clean blue jacket and long loose trousers of the peasant woman. Her face was pock-marked and men said that because of this she was not beautiful. But they admitted that her large black eyes were beautiful and shone with the fire of conviction, and when she smiled, two rows of white teeth gleamed between beautiful red lips. Illiterate she was indeed, for she had been the slave of a rich landlord who had bought her in childhood and used her a field laborer. Though she could recognise but a few written characters, still she was very intelligent so that men said of her: ″'Her thoughts are as clear and direct as bullets fired from a machine-gun.'″

Kang married Zhu De on 30 December 1930. In 1932, she was made leader of a newly created branch of women volunteers, who were trained in the Red Army School.

=== Long March ===
She became a women's leader in the Red Army and was one of a small number of women who were on the Long March. In the division of the Fourth Red Army, Kang was sent with Zhu De and Zhang Guotao.

In October 1935, Kang fell ill after Zhang Guotao's disastrous attempt to establish a communist base in Sichuan. Zhang reportedly kept Kang separated from her husband and attempted to leave her behind when the Fourth Red army moved to Shaanxi, but Zhu managed to bring a doctor and ensured Kang was carried on a stretcher through the Gold Mountains.

=== Yan'an ===
Kang was interviewed by the American journalist Helen Foster Snow during her stay in Yan'an. She commented on the military situation, telling Foster Snow that the army's numbers were a problem, but the issue of weaponry was urgent. Kang maintained contact with Foster Snow after this, even giving a speech at a 1991 conference congratulating her on being made Friendship Ambassador to China.

== People's Republic of China ==
Kang served as vice chairman of the Chinese People's Political Consultative Conference (CPPCC), chairman of the All-China Women's Federation, and president of Soong Ching-ling Foundation.

== Cultural Revolution ==
During the Cultural Revolution, Kang was under house arrest. She was later rehabilitated.

== Rehabilitation ==
After the fall of the Gang of Four, Kang was instated as the head of the All-China Women's Federation and is credited with centralising the organisation's bureaucracy. She was a member of the 11th and 12th Central Committees of the Chinese Communist Party (1977-1987).

== Women's Rights ==
Kang's ideology in the fight for women's liberation is embodied in the slogan 'Seek liberation in war, seek equality in production' (Chinese: 在斗争中求解放、在生产中求平等). 'Liberation in war' referred to women joining the revolutionary struggle to attain equality, while 'equality in production' meant that women should attain powers equal to those granted to men. This included the right to labour, which Kang considered fundamental to improving women's economic position. Kang argued 'equality' should also be expanded to politics, culture, science, and technology.

At the first meeting of the China Women's Committee in 1949, Kang made a speech advocating the liberation of women's labour and economic development.
