= Wushu Township =

Wushu Township 武术乡
- Township
- Location in Jiangxi Wushu Township (China)
- Coordinates: 26°20′2″N 114°57′50″E
- Country: People's Republic of China
- Province: Jiangxi
- Prefecture-level city: Ji'an
- County: Wan'an County
- Time zone: UTC+8 (China Standard)

Wushu Township (simplified Chinese: 武术乡; traditional Chinese: 武術鄉; pinyin: Wǔshù Xiāng) is a township in Wan'an County, Jiangxi, China. As of 2020, it administers Xuzhen (圩镇) Residential Neighborhood and the following six villages:

- Longwei Village (龙尾村)
- Daling Village (大岭村)
- Shetian Village (社田村)
- Shaokeng Village (稍坑村)
- Xinliao Village (新蓼村)
- Daliao Village (大蓼村)

== See also ==
- List of township-level divisions of Jiangxi
