= Les Milles (film) =

- Directed by: Sébastien Grall
- Screenplay by: Sébastien Grall; Jean-Claude Grumberg
- Story by: Sébastien Grall
- Produced by: Raymond Blumenthal
- Starring: Jean-Pierre Marielle; Philippe Noiret
- Cinematography: Andrzej J. Jaroszewicz
- Edited by: Joële Van Effenterre
- Music by: Alexandre Desplat
- Release date: 23 August 1995
- Running time: 103 minutes
- Country: France
- Language: French
- Budget: $7.5 million
- Box office: $1.4 million

Les Milles is a 1995 French drama film directed by Sébastien Grall.

== Cast ==
- Jean-Pierre Marielle – Commandant Perrochon
- Philippe Noiret – Général
- Kristin Scott Thomas – Mary–Jane Cooper
- Rüdiger Vogler – Feuchtwanger
- Ticky Holgado – Capitaine Moinard
- François Berléand – Lieutenant Boisset
- François Perrot – Colonel Maurice Charvet
- Jean-Marie Winling – Médecin-chef Garraud
