= Zhu Chenghu =

Chinese general

Zhu Chenghu (朱成虎, born 1952, in Dangtu, Anhui, China) was the dean of the National Defense University of the People's Liberation Army. He held the rank of Major General.

== Notable comments ==
At an event organized by the Better Hong Kong Foundation in July 2005, Zhu told Wall Street Journal reporter Danny Gittings, in the context of a Sino-U.S. military conflict over Taiwan, "if the Americans draw their missiles and position-guided ammunition on to the target zone on China's territory, I think we will have to respond with nuclear weapons," and that "we [...] will prepare ourselves for the destruction of all of the cities east of Xi'an. Of course the Americans will have to be prepared that hundreds ... of cities will be destroyed by the Chinese."

Gittings later wrote, "Almost too stunned to respond, I offered Gen. Zhu a chance to back down—or at least qualify the circumstances under which China would unleash its nuclear missiles against 'hundreds of, or two hundreds' of American cities. Presumably, I suggested, he was only talking about the unlikely scenario of a U.S. attack on mainland Chinese soil. No, the general replied, a nuclear response would be justified even if it was just a conventional attack on a Chinese aircraft or warship—something very likely if Washington honored its commitment to help defend Taiwan against an invasion by Beijing. A fellow correspondent offered Gen. Zhu another escape route, reminding him that China had a longstanding policy of no first use of nuclear weapons. But the general brushed that aside as well, saying the policy could be changed and was only really intended to apply to conflicts with nonnuclear states in any case."

The United States Congress called for Zhu to be fired from the National Defense University. A spokesperson from the Ministry of Foreign Affairs stated that the remarks were Zhu's personal opinion.

== Background ==
Beijing has had atomic bombs since 1964 and has often stated ‘‘no first use’’ policy on nuclear weapons. Zhu is the first Chinese high-ranking military official in the past ten years to have said that China is likely to use nuclear weapons against the United States if the need arises. The explicitness of his remarks has gone beyond that of similar remarks made by Xiong Guangkai during the Taiwan Strait crisis of 1996.

Zhu is one of China's better-known military analysts. During the war in Kosovo in Yugoslavia in the 1990s and the more recent wars in Afghanistan and Iraq, Zhang Zhaozhong, Peng Guangqian, Luo Yuan, and Zhu often publicly discussed and analyzed the war situation at China's two major military staff colleges – the NDU and the Academy of Military Sciences. The four men were also regarded in the Western world as Chinese high-ranking military officials who had taken on a hawkish shade.

== See also ==
- China and weapons of mass destruction
