= Wan'an County =

Wan'an County 万安县 Wanan
- County
- Location of Wan'an County (red) within Ji'an City (gold) and Jiangxi
- Coordinates: 26°29′N 114°49′E
- Country: People's Republic of China
- Province: Jiangxi
- Prefecture-level city: Ji'an

Area
  - Total: 2,051 km^{2} (792 sq mi)

Population
  - Total: 318,500
  - Density: 155.3/km^{2} (402.2/sq mi)
- Time zone: UTC+8 (China Standard)
- Postal code: 343800
- Website: www.wanan.gov.cn

Wan'an County (simplified Chinese: 万安县; traditional Chinese: 萬安縣; pinyin: Wàn'ān Xiàn) is a county in the southwest of Jiangxi province, People's Republic of China. It is under the jurisdiction of the prefecture-level city of Ji'an.

== Administrative divisions ==
Wan'an County has 9 towns and 7 townships.

9 towns

- Furong (芙蓉镇)
- Wufeng (五丰镇)
- Jiantou (枧头镇)
- Yaotou (窑头镇)
- Baijia (百嘉镇)
- Gaobei (高陂镇)
- Lutian (潞田镇)
- Shaping (沙坪镇)
- Xiazao (夏造镇)

7 townships

- Luotang (罗塘乡)
- Tanqian (弹前乡)
- Wushu (武术乡)
- Baoshan (宝山乡)
- Jiantian (涧田乡)
- Shunfeng (顺峰乡)
- Shaokou (韶口乡)

== Demographics ==
The population of the district was 281,079 in 1999.

== Climate ==
Climate data for Wan'an, elevation 102 m (335 ft), (1991–2020 normals, extremes 1981–present)
Month	Jan	Feb	Mar	Apr	May	Jun	Jul	Aug	Sep	Oct	Nov	Dec	Year
Record high °C (°F)	26.0 (78.8)	30.5 (86.9)	33.1 (91.6)	36.4 (97.5)	37.2 (99.0)	38.4 (101.1)	40.8 (105.4)	41.0 (105.8)	38.6 (101.5)	37.1 (98.8)	33.0 (91.4)	27.0 (80.6)	41.0 (105.8)
Mean daily maximum °C (°F)	11.1 (52.0)	14.1 (57.4)	17.6 (63.7)	24.1 (75.4)	28.2 (82.8)	31.0 (87.8)	34.4 (93.9)	33.7 (92.7)	29.9 (85.8)	25.2 (77.4)	19.5 (67.1)	13.6 (56.5)	23.5 (74.4)
Daily mean °C (°F)	7.0 (44.6)	9.7 (49.5)	13.3 (55.9)	19.3 (66.7)	23.5 (74.3)	26.6 (79.9)	29.3 (84.7)	28.4 (83.1)	25.0 (77.0)	19.9 (67.8)	14.3 (57.7)	8.7 (47.7)	18.8 (65.7)
Mean daily minimum °C (°F)	4.3 (39.7)	6.7 (44.1)	10.3 (50.5)	15.9 (60.6)	20.2 (68.4)	23.6 (74.5)	25.7 (78.3)	25.0 (77.0)	21.6 (70.9)	16.2 (61.2)	10.8 (51.4)	5.3 (41.5)	15.5 (59.8)
Record low °C (°F)	−6.0 (21.2)	−3.2 (26.2)	−2.2 (28.0)	2.9 (37.2)	9.4 (48.9)	13.9 (57.0)	19.0 (66.2)	19.5 (67.1)	13.6 (56.5)	4.4 (39.9)	−0.6 (30.9)	−6.9 (19.6)	−6.9 (19.6)
Average precipitation mm (inches)	71.5 (2.81)	90.4 (3.56)	158.8 (6.25)	162.2 (6.39)	203.7 (8.02)	224.8 (8.85)	125.9 (4.96)	159.4 (6.28)	89.2 (3.51)	67.3 (2.65)	79.4 (3.13)	57.5 (2.26)	1,490.1 (58.67)
Average precipitation days (≥ 0.1 mm)	13.7	13.6	18.3	17.1	17.8	16.2	11.4	14.0	10.4	8.4	10.4	10.4	161.7
Average snowy days	1.9	1.3	0.2	0	0	0	0	0	0	0	0	0.6	4
Average relative humidity (%)	82	82	83	81	82	81	73	77	81	79	81	80	80
Mean monthly sunshine hours	71.1	73.3	75.4	113.4	133.7	143.4	240.0	204.9	153.6	146.0	120.0	108.4	1,583.2
Percentage possible sunshine	21	23	20	29	32	35	57	51	42	41	37	33	35
Source: China Meteorological Administration
