= List of French films of 2008 =

A list of films produced in France in 2008.

| Title | Director | Cast | Genre | Notes |
|---|---|---|---|---|
| 8th Wonderland | Nicolas Alberny and Jean Mach | Matthew Géczy, Alain Azerot, Eloïssa Florez | Science fiction | |
| À l'aventure | Jean-Claude Brisseau | Carole Brana, Jocelyn Quivrin | Drama | |
| Asterix at the Olympic Games | Frédéric Forestier; Thomas Langmann | Clovis Cornillac; Gérard Depardieu | Comedy | |
| La Belle Personne | Christophe Honoré | Louis Garrel, Grégoire Leprince-Ringuet; Léa Seydoux | Drama | |
| Bienvenue chez les Ch'tis | Dany Boon | Kad Merad, Dany Boon, Zoé Félix | Comedy | Box office record in France |
| Black | Pierre Laffargue | MC Jean Gab'1 | Blaxploitation | |
| Un conte de Noël | Arnaud Desplechin | Catherine Deneuve, Jean-Paul Roussillon; Mathieu Amalric, Anne Consigny, Melvil Poupaud, Emmanuelle Devos, Chiara Mastroianni | Comedy / Drama | César Award for Best Supporting Actor for Jean-Paul Roussillon |
| The Class (Entre les murs) | Laurent Cantet | François Bégaudeau | Drama / Semi-Biographical | |
| Le crime est notre affaire | Pascal Thomas | Catherine Frot, André Dussollier | Comedy/Mystery | |
| Dragon Hunters | Arthur Qwak | Vincent Lindon, Patrick Timsit and Marie Drion | Animated fantasy | |
| The First Day of the Rest of Your Life | Rémi Bezançon | Jacques Gamblin, Zabou Breitman; Déborah François, Marc-André Grondin | Comedy | Best Editing (Sophie Reine), Most Promising Actor (Marc-André Grondin) and Most Promising Actress (Déborah François) at the César Awards |
| Le Voyage du Ballon Rouge | Hou Hsiao-hsien | Juliette Binoche, Simon Iteanu | Drama | FIPRESCI Prize at the 2007 Valladolid International Film Festival |
| Female Agents (Les Femmes de l'Ombre) | Jean-Paul Salomé | Sophie Marceau; Julie Depardieu | War film | About female resistance agents in WWII |
| Le Grand alibi | Pascal Bonitzer | Caterina Murino, Valeria Bruni Tedeschi, Lambert Wilson, Miou-Miou, Nicole Garcia | Crime film | |
| Les liens du sang | Jacques Maillot | Marie Denarnaud, Helene Foubert | Crime, Action | Set in 1979 |
| I've Loved You So Long | Philippe Claudel | Kristin Scott Thomas | Drama | BAFTA Award for Best Film Not in the English Language |
| Johnny Mad Dog | Jean-Stéphane Sauvaire | | | Based on a novel by Emmanuel Dongala about child soldiers |
| Julia | Erick Zonca | Tilda Swinton | Crime drama film | |
| Kabuli Kid | Barmak Akram | Haji Gul Aser, Valéry Schatz, Amélie Glenn | Drama | With Afghanistan. Screened at the 65th Venice International Film Festival |
| LOL (Laughing Out Loud) | Lisa Azuelos | Sophie Marceau, Christa Théret, Jérémy Kapone | Comedy | |
| Martyrs | Pascal Laugier | Morjana Alaoui; Mylène Jampanoï | Horror | |
| Nos 18 ans | Frédéric Berthe | Pierre Boulanger; Michel Blanc | Comedy | Remake of "Notte prima degli esami" (2006, Italy) |
| Parc | Arnaud des Pallières | Sergi López, Jean-Marc Barr, Geraldine Chaplin, Nathalie Richard | Drama | |
| Paris | Cédric Klapisch | Juliette Binoche, Romain Duris, Fabrice Luchini, François Cluzet, Mélanie Laurent, Maurice Bénichou, Karin Viard | | |
| Paris 36 | Christophe Barratier | Gérard Jugnot, Clovis Cornillac, Kad Merad, Nora Arnezeder | Musical dramedy | |
| Passe-passe | Tonie Marshall | Nathalie Baye, Édouard Baer | Crime film | |
| Sagan | Diane Kurys | Sylvie Testud | Biographical | |
| Séraphine | Martin Provost | Yolande Moreau; Ulrich Tukur | Drama | |
| A Simple Heart | Marion Laine | Sandrine Bonnaire | Drama | Entered into the 30th Moscow International Film Festival |
| Stella | Sylvie Verheyde | Léora Barbara, Benjamin Biolay, Guillaume Depardieu | Comedy / Drama | |
| Summer Hours | Olivier Assayas | Juliette Binoche, Charles Berling, Jérémie Renier, Kyle Eastwood | Drama | |
| Taken | Pierre Morel | Liam Neeson, Famke Janssen, Maggie Grace | Thriller | 20th Century Fox |
