= 34th César Awards =

Awarding of the cinematographic prize

- Date: 27 February 2009
- Site: Théâtre du Châtelet, Paris, France
- Hosted by: Antoine de Caunes

Highlights
- Best Film: Séraphine
- Best Actor: Vincent Cassel; Mesrine
- Best Actress: Yolande Moreau; Séraphine
- Most awards: Séraphine
- Most nominations: Mesrine

Television coverage
- Network: Canal+

The 34th César Awards ceremony was presented by the Académie des Arts et Techniques du Cinéma to honour its selection of the best films of 2008 on 27 February 2009. Canal+ broadcast the event, which took place again at Théâtre du Châtelet in Paris, France. The nominations for the Awards were announced on 23 January. The ceremony was chaired by Charlotte Gainsbourg and hosted by Antoine de Caunes. Séraphine won the award for Best Film.

== Winners and nominees ==
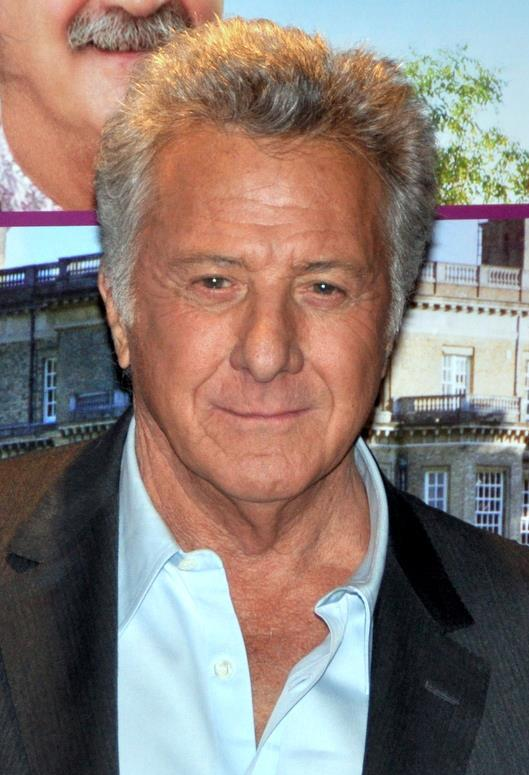
Dustin Hoffman, Honorary César recipient

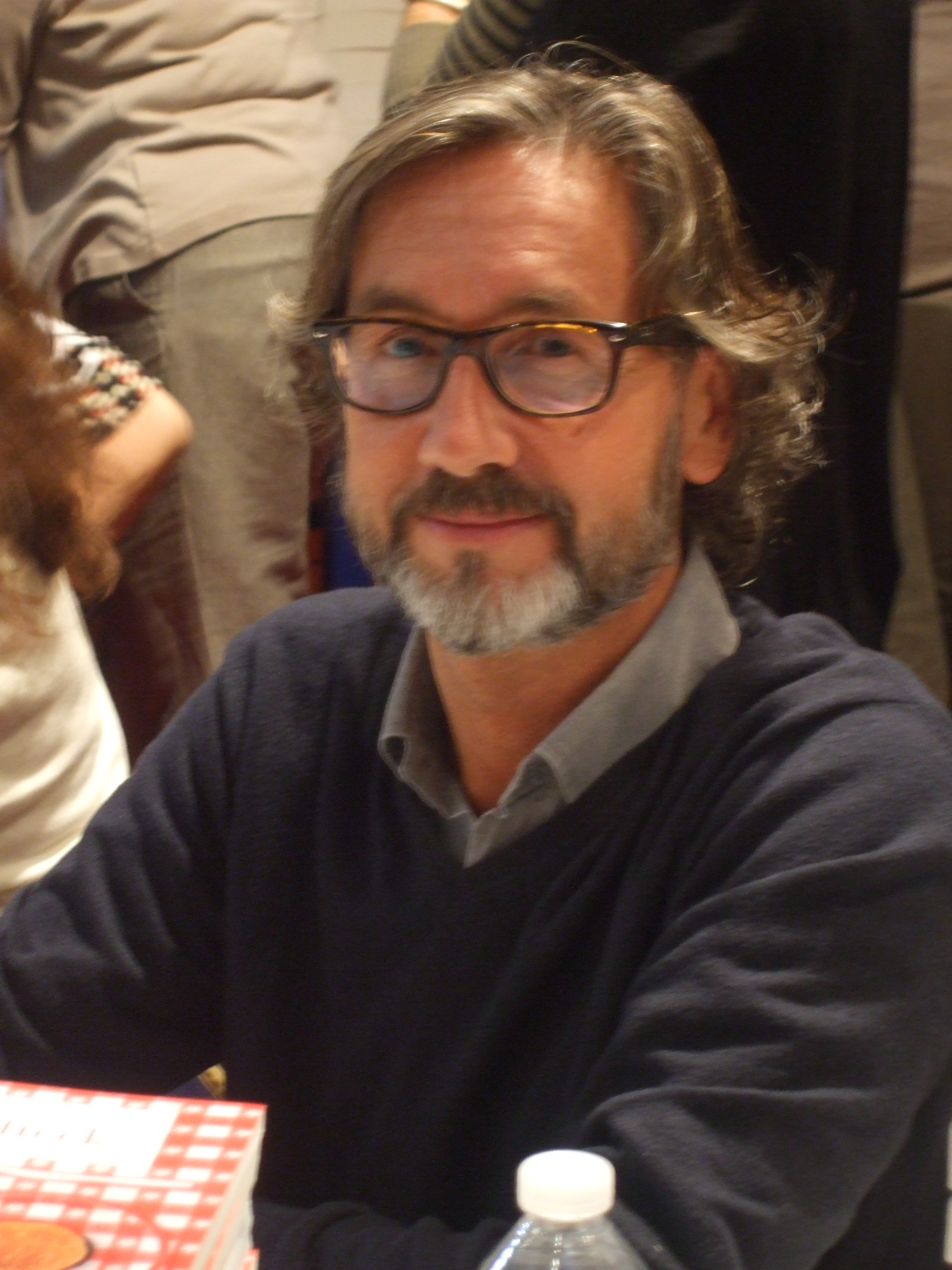
Martin Provost, Best Film and Best Original Screenplay winner

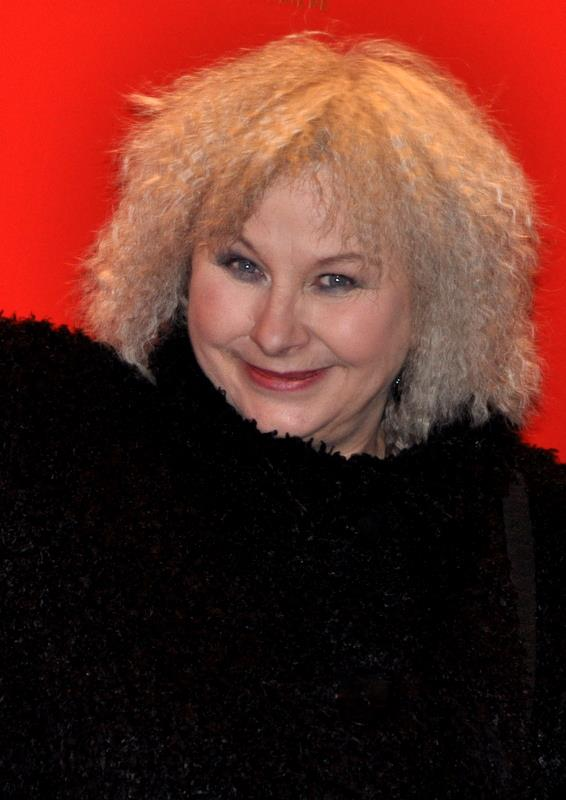
Yolande Moreau, Best Actress winner

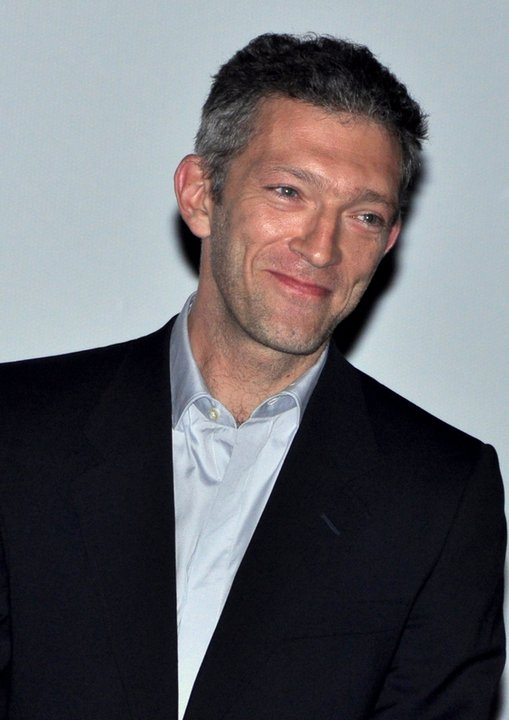
Vincent Cassel, Best Actor winner

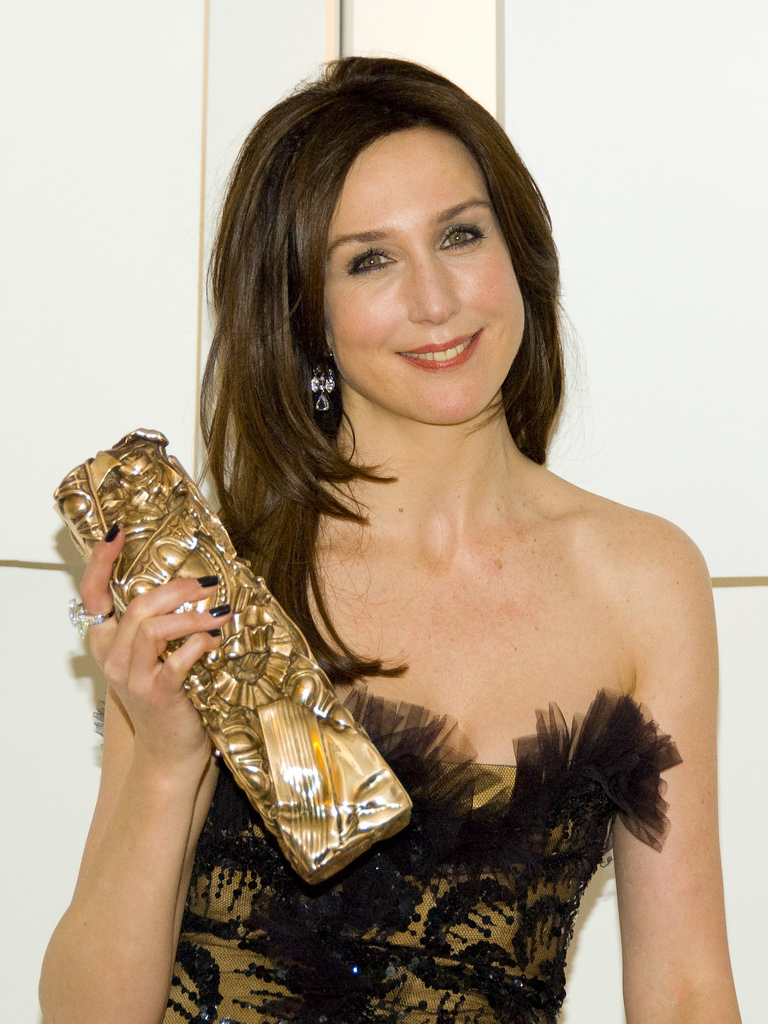
Elsa Zylberstein, Best Supporting Actress winner

Best Film (presented by Sean Penn and Charlotte Gainsbourg) Séraphine: The Class; I've Loved You So Long; Mesrine; Paris; The First Day of the Rest of Your Life; A Christmas Tale	Best Director (presented by Carole Bouquet) Jean-François Richet – Mesrine: Laurent Cantet – The Class; Rémi Bezançon – The First Day of the Rest of Your Life; Martin Provost – Séraphine; Arnaud Desplechin – A Christmas Tale
Best Actor (presented by Diane Kruger) Vincent Cassel – Mesrine: François-Xavier Demaison – Coluche, l'histoire d'un mec; Guillaume Depardieu – Versailles; Albert Dupontel – Love Me No More; Jacques Gamblin – The First Day of the Rest of Your Life	Best Actress (presented by Lambert Wilson) Yolande Moreau – Séraphine: Catherine Frot – Crime Is Our Business; Kristin Scott Thomas – I've Loved You So Long; Tilda Swinton – Julia; Sylvie Testud – Sagan
Best Supporting Actor (presented by Julie Depardieu) Jean-Paul Roussillon – A Christmas Tale: Benjamin Biolay – Stella; Claude Rich – With a Little Help from Myself; Pierre Vaneck – Love Me No More; Roschdy Zem – The Girl from Monaco	Best Supporting Actress (presented by Tomer Sisley) Elsa Zylberstein – I've Loved You So Long: Jeanne Balibar – Sagan; Anne Consigny – A Christmas Tale; Édith Scob – Summer Hours; Karin Viard – Paris
Most Promising Actor (presented by Cécile Cassel) Marc-André Grondin – The First Day of the Rest of Your Life: Ralph Amoussou – With a Little Help from Myself; Laurent Capelluto – A Christmas Tale; Grégoire Leprince-Ringuet – The Beautiful Person; Pio Marmaï – The First Day of the Rest of Your Life	Most Promising Actress (presented by Gaspard Ulliel) Déborah François – The First Day of the Rest of Your Life: Marilou Berry – Vilaine; Louise Bourgoin – The Girl from Monaco; Anaïs Demoustier – Les Grandes Personnes; Léa Seydoux – The Beautiful Person
Best Original Screenplay (presented by Florence Foresti) Séraphine – Marc Abdelnour and Martin Provost: Bienvenue chez les Ch'tis – Dany Boon, Alexandre Charlot and Franck Magnier; I've Loved You So Long – Philippe Claudel; The First Day of the Rest of Your Life – Rémi Bezançon; A Christmas Tale – Emmanuel Bourdieu and Arnaud Desplechin	Best Adaptation (presented by Tilda Swinton) The Class – François Bégaudeau, Robin Campillo and Laurent Cantet: The Beautiful Person – Christophe Honoré and Gilles Taurand; Crime Is Our Business – François Caviglioli, Nathalie Lafaurie and Clémence de Biéville; Love Me No More – Éric Assous, François d'Epenoux and Jean Becker; Mesrine – Abdel Raouf Dafri and Jean-François Richet
Best First Feature Film (presented by Dany Boon) I've Loved You So Long: Home; Masquerades; Anything for Her; Versailles	Best Cinematography (presented by Mylène Jampanoï) Laurent Brunet – Séraphine: Tom Stern – Paris 36; Agnès Godard – Home; Robert Gantz – Mesrine; Eric Gautier – A Christmas Tale
Best Editing (presented by Laurent Stocker and Léa Drucker) Sophie Reine – The First Day of the Rest of Your Life: Stéphanie Léger and Robin Campillo – The Class; Hervé Schneid and Bill Pankow – Mesrine; Francine Sandberg – Paris 36; Laurence Briaud – A Christmas Tale	Best Sound (presented by Amira Casar and Guillaume Gallienne) Jean Minondo, Gérard Hardy, Alexandre Widmer, Loïc Prian, François Groult and Hervé Buirette – Mesrine: Olivier Mauvezin, Agnès Ravez and Jean-Pierre Laforce – The Class; Daniel Sobrino, Roman Dymny and Vincent Goujon – Paris 36; Philippe Vandendriessche, Emmanuel Croset and Ingrid Ralet – Séraphine; Jean-Pierre Laforce, Nicolas Cantin and Sylvain Malbrant – A Christmas Tale
Best Original Music (presented by Aïssa Maïga) Michael Galasso – Séraphine: Reinhardt Wagner – Paris 36; Jean-Louis Aubert – I've Loved You So Long; Marco Beltrami and Marcus Trumpp – Mesrine; Sinclair – The First Day of the Rest of Your Life	Best Costume Design (presented by Amira Casar and Guillaume Gallienne) Madeline Fontaine – Séraphine: Carine Sarfati – Paris 36; Pierre-Jean Larroque – Female Agents; Virginie Montel – Mesrine; Nathalie du Roscoat – Sagan
Best Production Design (presented by cast of The Class) Thierry François – Séraphine: Olivier Raoux – Trouble at Timpetill; Jean Rabasse – Paris 36; Ivan Niclass – Home; Emile Ghigo – Mesrine	Best Short Film (presented by Julie Ferrier) Les Miettes: Les Paradis perdus; Skhizein; Taxi Wala; Une leçon particulière
Best Documentary Film (presented by Élie Semoun) The Beaches of Agnès: Elle s'appelle Sabine; J'irai dormir à Hollywood; Tabarly; La Vie moderne	Best Foreign Film (presented by Monica Bellucci) Waltz with Bashir: Eldorado; Gomorrah; Into the Wild; Lorna's Silence; There Will Be Blood; Two Lovers
Honorary César (presented by Emma Thompson) Dustin Hoffman

== Viewers ==
The show was followed by 2.1 millions of viewers. This corresponds to 11.4% of the audience.

== See also ==
- 81st Academy Awards
- 62nd British Academy Film Awards
- 21st European Film Awards
- 14th Lumière Awards
- 54th David di Donatello
- 24th Goya Awards
