= 14th Lumière Awards =

2009 French film awards ceremony

- Date: 19 January 2009
- Site: Hôtel de Ville, Paris, France

Highlights
- Best Film: The Class
- Best Director: François Dupeyron
- Best Actor: Vincent Cassel
- Best Actress: Yolande Moreau

The 14th Lumière Awards ceremony, presented by the Académie des Lumières to honour the best in France's French-speaking cinema, was held on 19 January 2009. The ceremony was presided by Jeanne Balibar. The Class won the award for Best Film.

== Winners and nominees ==
Winners are listed first and highlighted in bold.

Best Film	Best Director
**The Class**: Mesrine: Killer Instinct & Mesrine: Public Enemy Number One; A Christmas Tale; Séraphine; With a Little Help from Myself	**François Dupeyron — With a Little Help from Myself**: Arnaud Desplechin — A Christmas Tale; Laurent Cantet — The Class; Jean-François Richet — Mesrine: Killer Instinct & Mesrine: Public Enemy Number One; Martin Provost — Séraphine
Best Actor	Best Actress
**Vincent Cassel** — **Mesrine: Killer Instinct** & **Mesrine: Public Enemy Number One**: André Dussollier — Cortex; Claude Rich — With a Little Help from Myself; Albert Dupontel — Love Me No More; Kad Merad — Bienvenue chez les Ch'tis; Guillaume Depardieu — Versailles	**Yolande Moreau** — **Séraphine**: Catherine Frot — Mark of an Angel; Felicite Wouassi — With a Little Help from Myself; Kristin Scott Thomas — I've Loved You So Long; Sylvie Testud — Sagan
Most Promising Actor	Most Promising Actress
**Mohamed Bouchaïb** — **Masquerades**: Emile Berling — Behind the Walls; François Civil — Dying or Feeling Better; Anton Balekdjian — Un monde à nous; Marco Cortes — Khamsa	**Nora Arnezeder** — **Paris 36**: Bertille Noël-Bruneau — The Fox and the Child; Karina Testa — Dolls and Angels; Leïla Bekhti — Dolls and Angels; Léa Seydoux — The Beautiful Person; Sara Reguigue — Masquerades
Best Screenplay	Best French-Language Film
**I Always Wanted to Be a Gangster** — **Samuel Benchetrit**: The Class — François Bégaudeau, Robin Campillo and Laurent Cantet; Séraphine — Marc Abdelnour and Martin Provost; Bienvenue chez les Ch'tis — Dany Boon, Alexandre Charlot and Franck Magnier; Louise Hires a Contract Killer — Benoît Delépine and Gustave Kervern	**Lorna's Silence**: Johnny Mad Dog; Home; Rumba; Faro: Goddess of the Waters
Best Cinematography	World Audience Award (presented by TV5Monde)
**Agnès Godard** — **Home**	**The Class** — **Laurent Cantet**

== See also ==
- 34th César Awards
