= 21st European Film Awards =

2008 film awards ceremony in Denmark

The 21st European Film Awards
- Date: 6 December 2008
- Location: Copenhagen, Denmark
- Presented by: European Film Academy

The 21st Annual European Film Awards took place on 6 December 2008 in Copenhagen, Denmark.

== Winners and nominees ==
=== Best European Actor ===
(Italy) Toni Servillo – Gomorrah (Gomorra) and Il Divo

- (Germany) Michael Fassbender – Hunger
- (Denmark) Thure Lindhardt and Mads Mikkelsen – Flame & Citron (Flammen & Citronen)
- (United Kingdom) James McAvoy – Atonement
- (Germany) Jürgen Vogel – The Wave (Die Welle)
- (Germany) Elmar Wepper – Cherry Blossoms (Kirschblüten – Hanami)

=== Best European Actress ===
(United Kingdom) Kristin Scott Thomas – I've Loved You So Long (Il y a longtemps que je t'aime)

- (Israel) Hiam Abbass – Lemon Tree
- (Kosovo) Arta Dobroshi – The Silence of Lorna (Le silence de Lorna)
- (United Kingdom) Sally Hawkins – Happy-Go-Lucky
- (Spain) Belen Rueda – The Orphanage (El orfanato)
- (Germany) Ursula Werner – Cloud 9 (Wolke Neun)

=== Best European Composer ===
(Germany) Max Richter – Waltz with Bashir (Vals im Bashir)

- Tuur Florizoone – Moscow, Belgium (Aanrijding in Moscou)
- (Italy) Dario Marianelli – Atonement
- (Spain) Fernando Velázquez – The Orphanage (El orfanato)

=== Best European Director ===
(Italy) Matteo Garrone – Gomorrah (Gomorra)

- (France) Laurent Cantet – The Class (Entre les murs)
- (Germany) Andreas Dresen – Cloud 9 (Wolke Neun)
- (Israel) Ari Folman – Waltz with Bashir (Vals im Bashir)
- (United Kingdom) Steve McQueen – Hunger
- (Italy) Paolo Sorrentino – Il Divo

=== Best European Film ===
English title	Original title	Director(s)	Country
Gomorrah	Gomorra	Matteo Garrone	Italy
Il Divo		Paolo Sorrentino	Italy
The Class	Entre les murs	Laurent Cantet	France
Happy-Go-Lucky		Mike Leigh	United Kingdom
The Orphanage	El orfanato	Juan Antonio Bayona	Spain
Waltz with Bashir	ואלס עם באשיר	Ari Folman	Israel, France, Germany

=== Best European Screenwriter ===
Maurizio Braucci, Ugo Chiti, Gianni di Gregorio, Matteo Garrone, Massimo Gaudioso and Roberto Saviano – Gomorrah (Gomorra)

- Suha Arraf and Eran Riklis – Lemon Tree
- Ari Folman – Waltz with Bashir
- Paolo Sorrentino – Il Divo
