= Manili =

Manili may refers to:

- Corrado Manili (died 1522), Italian Roman Catholic bishop
- Liza Manili (born 1986), French actress
- Manili massacre, the mass murder of 70 Moro Muslims in North Cotabato, Philippines
