= Versailles (film) =

- Film poster
- Directed by: Pierre Schoeller
- Written by: Pierre Schoeller
- Produced by: Philippe Martin
- Starring: Guillaume Depardieu
- Cinematography: Julien Hirsch
- Edited by: Mathilde Muyard
- Music by: Philippe Schoeller
- Production companies: Les Films Pelléas; Canal+
- Distributed by: Les Films du Losange
- Release date: 19 May 2008 (Cannes Film Festival)
- Running time: 102 minutes
- Country: France
- Language: French
- Budget: $2.4 million
- Box office: $890,248

Versailles is a 2008 French film written and directed by Pierre Schoeller. It had its world premiere at the 2008 Cannes Film Festival on 19 May 2008.

== Cast ==
- Guillaume Depardieu as Damien
- Max Baissette de Malglaive as Enzo
- Judith Chemla as Nina
- Aure Atika as Nadine
- Patrick Descamps as Jean-Jacques
- Brigitte Sy as Madame Herchel

== Accolades ==
Year	Award	Category	Recipient	Result
2008	Bratislava International Film Festival	Grand Prix	Pierre Schoeller	Nominated
2008	Cannes Film Festival	Caméra d'Or	Pierre Schoeller	Nominated
2008	Cannes Film Festival	Un Certain Regard Award	Pierre Schoeller	Nominated
2008	Cinemania	Audience Award	Pierre Schoeller	Won
2008	Hamburg Film Festival	Critics Award	Pierre Schoeller	Nominated
2009	César Awards	Best Actor	Guillaume Depardieu	Nominated
2009	César Awards	Best First Film	Pierre Schoeller, Géraldine Michelot & Philippe Martin	Nominated
2009	Lumière Awards	Best Actor	Guillaume Depardieu	Nominated
