= Here After (2021 film) =

- Directed by: Harry Greenberger
- Written by: Harry Greenberger
- Produced by: Harry Greenberger; Carmine Famiglietti
- Starring: Nora Arnezeder; Andy Karl; Christina Ricci
- Release date: March 7, 2020 (Cinequest Film Festival): July 23, 2021; (United States)
- Running time: 121 minutes
- Country: United States
- Language: English

Here After is a 2021 American fantasy romantic comedy film written and directed by Harry Greenberger and starring Nora Arnezeder, Andy Karl and Christina Ricci.

== Cast ==
- Andy Karl as Michael
- Nora Arnezeder as Honey Bee
- Jeannie Berlin as Goldie
- Nikki M. James as Faith
- Jackie Cruz as Susan
- Alex Hurt as Patrick
- Michael Rispoli as Angelo
- Christina Ricci as Scarlett

== Release ==
The film was released on demand on July 23, 2021.

== Reception ==
The film has a 30% rating on Rotten Tomatoes based on 10 reviews. Andrea Beach of Common Sense Media awarded the film two stars out of five. Joshua Axelrod of the Pittsburgh Post-Gazette awarded the film two and a half stars out of four.
