= A Christmas Tale =

2008 film by Arnaud Desplechin

- Theatrical release poster
- French: Un conte de Noël
- Directed by: Arnaud Desplechin
- Screenplay by: Arnaud Desplechin; Emmanuel Bourdieu
- Produced by: Pascal Caucheteux
- Starring: Catherine Deneuve; Jean-Paul Roussillon; Mathieu Amalric; Anne Consigny; Melvil Poupaud; Emmanuelle Devos; Chiara Mastroianni
- Cinematography: Éric Gautier
- Edited by: Laurence Briaud
- Music by: Grégoire Hetzel
- Production companies: Why Not Productions; France 2 Cinéma; Wild Bunch
- Distributed by: BAC Films
- Release dates: 16 May 2008 (Cannes); 21 May 2008 (France)
- Running time: 150 minutes
- Country: France
- Language: French
- Budget: €6.36 million
- Box office: $7.36 million

A Christmas Tale (French: Un conte de Noël) is a 2008 French Christmas comedy-drama film directed by Arnaud Desplechin, who co-wrote the screenplay with Emmanuel Bourdieu. Produced by Pascal Caucheteux for Why Not Productions, the film features an ensemble cast including Catherine Deneuve, Jean-Paul Roussillon, Mathieu Amalric, Anne Consigny, Melvil Poupaud, Emmanuelle Devos, Chiara Mastroianni, and Hippolyte Girardot.

Set in Roubaix, the film follows the estranged members of the Vuillard family, who reunite for Christmas after their matriarch, Junon (Deneuve), is diagnosed with leukemia and requires a bone marrow transplant. The gathering revives longstanding resentments, particularly between Junon's daughter Elizabeth (Consigny) and her estranged son Henri (Amalric), while the family confronts the consequences of an earlier tragedy involving the death of Junon's eldest child. The narrative explores familial relationships, illness, grief, and reconciliation through a combination of comedy and drama.

A Christmas Tale premiered on 16 May 2008 at the 2008 Cannes Film Festival, where it competed for the Palme d'Or. It was released theatrically in France on 21 May 2008 and in the United States on 14 November 2008 by IFC Films. The film received generally positive reviews, particularly for its ensemble performances and portrayal of family relationships. At Cannes, Deneuve received a special jury award recognizing her contribution to cinema. At the 34th César Awards in 2009, the film received nine nominations, including Best Film, Best Director, and Best Original Screenplay, winning the Best Supporting Actor award for Roussillon. The film has since been recognized in retrospective rankings of Christmas and French cinema, placing fifth on Metacritic's list of the best 21st-century holiday films, 26th on Rotten Tomatoes' list of the 100 best Christmas films of all time, and 71st on Time Out's list of the 100 best French films of all time.

== Plot ==
Abel and Junon Vuillard have four children. Their eldest son, Joseph, develops a rare genetic disorder for which a bone marrow transplant is the only possible treatment. Neither his parents nor his younger sister, Elizabeth, are compatible donors. Hoping to save him, Abel and Junon conceive a third child, Henri, but he also proves incompatible, and Joseph dies at the age of seven. The couple subsequently have another son, Ivan.

Decades later, Elizabeth is a successful playwright living in Paris with her husband, Claude, and their teenage son, Paul, who has been receiving psychiatric treatment. Henri has experienced financial difficulties and developed a contentious relationship with his family. Several years earlier, Elizabeth paid his debts on the condition that she never see him again, effectively excluding him from family gatherings. Ivan, meanwhile, is married to Sylvia, with whom he has two sons, Basile and Baptiste. The siblings remain close to their cousin Simon, who was raised by Abel and Junon following his parents' deaths.

Shortly before Christmas, Junon is diagnosed with leukemia. Chemotherapy is ineffective, and a bone marrow transplant offers her the possibility of survival, although the procedure carries a considerable risk of rejection. Her children and grandchildren undergo compatibility testing, and Paul is identified as a potential donor. His psychological difficulties and Claude's reservations complicate the decision. The family gathers at Abel and Junon's home in Roubaix for Christmas, where Paul invites Henri despite Elizabeth's opposition. Henri arrives with his girlfriend, Faunia, while Claude joins the reunion later.

Henri's return revives his longstanding conflict with Elizabeth, while his relationship with Junon remains strained. Although initially unwilling to undergo testing, he eventually discovers that he is also a compatible donor and agrees to provide his bone marrow. Junon openly acknowledges that she has never loved him, but accepts his offer. Henri also develops a closer relationship with Paul, who fears that the medical tests might reveal Claude is not his biological father. Henri reassures his nephew, and their growing friendship helps alleviate some of Paul's anxieties.

During the reunion, Rosaimée, an elderly friend of Abel's late mother, tells Sylvia that Simon had been in love with her before her marriage to Ivan. Simon had concealed his feelings and withdrawn because he believed she would be happier with Ivan. Feeling deprived of the opportunity to make her own choice, Sylvia confronts Simon. On Christmas Eve, after he disappears from the family gathering, she finds him drinking in a bar. They return to the house and spend the night together. Ivan discovers their affair on Christmas morning but does not openly confront them.

Meanwhile, Elizabeth confides in Abel about her persistent unhappiness. He reads to her from Friedrich Nietzsche's On the Genealogy of Morality, encouraging her to consider the origins of her distress. Despite moments of intimacy among the relatives, Elizabeth's estrangement from Henri remains unresolved. As the Christmas gathering concludes, most of the family depart, while Paul stays with Henri.

Henri subsequently undergoes the bone marrow donation procedure, and Junon receives the transplant. Despite his assistance, she remains convinced that her body will reject his marrow. At the hospital, Henri tosses a coin in front of Junon but refuses to reveal the result. In the closing narration, Elizabeth expresses confidence that Junon will survive, although the outcome of the transplant remains unknown.

== Cast ==
The film's cast includes:

- Catherine Deneuve as Junon Vuillard
- Jean-Paul Roussillon as Abel Vuillard
- Anne Consigny as Elizabeth Dédalus
- Mathieu Amalric as Henri Vuillard
- Melvil Poupaud as Ivan Vuillard
- Chiara Mastroianni as Sylvia Vuillard
- Hippolyte Girardot as Claude Dédalus
- Emmanuelle Devos as Faunia
- Laurent Capelluto as Simon
- Émile Berling as Paul Dédalus
- Françoise Bertin as Rosaimée
- Samir Guesmi as Spatafora
- Thomas Obled as Basile Vuillard
- Clément Obled as Baptiste Vuillard
- Azize Kabouche as Dr. Zraïdi

== Production ==
=== Development and writing ===
A Christmas Tale was written by Arnaud Desplechin and Emmanuel Bourdieu, who had previously collaborated on My Sex Life... or How I Got into an Argument (1996) and Esther Kahn (2000). Desplechin spent at least a year developing the screenplay, drawing upon literary and philosophical works as well as medical research. He explained that the writing process began with passages from Ralph Waldo Emerson's reflections on the death of his son, particularly the philosopher's unusual response to bereavement. Intrigued by the possibility of translating these ideas into a dramatic performance, Desplechin developed the character of Abel and the film's opening sequence around a father reflecting on the death of his child.

Desplechin initially conceived the project as a French variation on the American Thanksgiving family-reunion film, constructing the narrative around relatives gathering in a single house. He compared the screenplay's structure to an Advent calendar, with successive scenes introducing different family members and revealing aspects of their relationships. He also sought to combine tragic circumstances with comedy, using the conventions of family melodrama while avoiding a straightforward narrative of reconciliation.

Another influence was La Greffe: entre biologie et psychanalyse, a study of organ transplantation by Jacques Ascher and Jean-Pierre Jouet. The book examines the psychological and ethical consequences of transplantation, including its effects on relationships between donors, recipients, and their families. Desplechin encountered the study while developing the conflict between Junon and Henri and incorporated bone marrow transplantation into the narrative as a means of reuniting the estranged family. He subsequently visited several hospitals and interviewed the book's authors to verify the medical details of the screenplay. He described his approach as first imagining the dramatic circumstances and then checking their scientific plausibility.

The screenplay also required mathematical consultation for a scene in which Abel and Claude calculate the probabilities associated with Junon's medical treatment. Mathematicians Wendelin Werner and Cédric Villani assisted with the scientific preparation of the sequence, which moves from a discrete probability model to a continuous one. Their involvement was subsequently documented by mathematics educator Alban Regnauld in a 2019 analysis published in Repères IREM.

The film was produced by Pascal Caucheteux through Why Not Productions, in coproduction with France 2 Cinéma. Wild Bunch handled international sales, and BAC Films handled French distribution. Its budget was €6.36 million, with financial support including an advance on receipts from the Centre national du cinéma et de l'image animée (CNC) and pre-sales to Canal+ and CinéCinéma. The production also received support from the regional audiovisual organization CRRAV and the Nord-Pas-de-Calais regional government.

=== Casting ===
Desplechin assembled an ensemble cast combining actors with whom he had previously worked and performers appearing in his films for the first time. His frequent collaborators Mathieu Amalric and Emmanuelle Devos were cast as Henri and Faunia, respectively, while Catherine Deneuve and Jean-Paul Roussillon portrayed Junon and Abel. Desplechin explained that he generally avoided writing characters for particular actors, preferring to complete the screenplay before considering performers who might bring unexpected qualities to their roles.

Deneuve was not originally envisaged for the role of Junon. In an interview with Cineuropa, Desplechin explained that he offered her the part after completing the screenplay and that she was attracted to the relationship between Junon and Abel, particularly the opportunity to portray a woman with a satisfying marriage. Desplechin also discussed his longstanding professional relationship with Amalric, whom he had previously directed in My Sex Life... or How I Got into an Argument and Kings and Queen (2004).

Chiara Mastroianni, Deneuve's daughter, was cast as Sylvia, Junon's daughter-in-law. Desplechin recalled hesitating for nearly two weeks before approaching Mastroianni, concerned that the characters' antagonistic relationship might create difficulties between the two actresses. Both subsequently described their work together as professional. At the 2008 Cannes Film Festival, Deneuve compared the atmosphere among the actors to that of a theatrical company, noting that the cast's shared accommodation during filming encouraged a sense of familiarity.

Desplechin favoured individual preparation over extensive ensemble rehearsals. He discussed the screenplay separately with each performer, asking them not to disclose their conversations to the other actors. He believed that keeping aspects of the characters' motivations private could produce more spontaneous interactions during filming. He also encouraged performers to explore different interpretations of their dialogue rather than adhere rigidly to the emotional directions indicated in the screenplay.

=== Filming and post-production ===
A townhouse on Boulevard du Général-de-Gaulle in Roubaix, the film's principal setting.

Principal photography took place in northern France, particularly in Roubaix, Desplechin's birthplace and the setting of much of the narrative. Filming locations included Roubaix station and La Piscine Museum, with additional scenes shot in Paris, including locations in the 14th arrondissement. The production used existing locations rather than relying exclusively on studio sets. Deneuve recalled that shooting in a provincial city allowed the actors to spend considerable time together outside working hours, contributing to the ensemble's familiarity.

Éric Gautier served as cinematographer, with Dan Bevan responsible for production design and Nathalie Raoul for costume design. The film was photographed on 35 mm film in a widescreen format. In a 2008 interview with Critikat, Gautier explained that the production used conventional cameras, film stock, and laboratory processing rather than specialized equipment or experimental development methods. He attributed the film's visual character principally to Desplechin's direction and the lighting. Gautier also recalled that he and Desplechin opposed a request from France 2, one of the coproducers, to reframe the widescreen image for television.

The film incorporates several narrative devices, including direct address, shadow puppetry, photographs, and changes in visual presentation. Desplechin explained that the characters' direct addresses to the camera were developed during the later stages of screenwriting as a means of allowing each family member to assert their own perspective. The shadow-puppet sequence introducing the Vuillards' history was intended to communicate the family's shared mythology. Desplechin regarded these techniques as ways of presenting a complex ensemble narrative without relying entirely on conventional exposition.

Laurence Briaud edited the film. Desplechin described editing as a collaborative process in which individual sequences could be reshaped to emphasize the actors' performances. He sometimes removed dialogue temporarily to examine the emotional effect of a scene without spoken words, subsequently experimenting with music to establish its rhythm and tone. He considered this process particularly useful when the original dialogue or dramatic construction did not adequately convey the intended emotion.

=== Music ===
The original score was composed by Grégoire Hetzel, who had previously collaborated with Desplechin on Kings and Queen. The soundtrack combines Hetzel's compositions with existing classical, jazz, and popular recordings. These include music by Felix Mendelssohn, George Gershwin, Antonio Vivaldi, and Domenico Scarlatti, alongside recordings associated with Otis Redding and other popular musicians. Mendelssohn's incidental music for A Midsummer Night's Dream also reflects the film's references to William Shakespeare's comedy.

Desplechin explained that the musical selections were generally not determined before filming. Instead, he experimented with different recordings during editing, sometimes temporarily removing the dialogue to concentrate on the emotional qualities of the performances. He described music as a means of discovering the expressive possibilities of a sequence rather than simply accompanying its action. In discussing this approach, he acknowledged the influence of Martin Scorsese's use of existing recordings in film editing.

A soundtrack album, also titled Un conte de Noël, was released by Naïve on 2 June 2008. The album comprises 24 tracks with a total running time of approximately 65 minutes, combining Hetzel's original pieces, including "Henri's March", "La Ponction", and "La Démonstration", with licensed recordings featured in the film.

== Themes and analysis ==
=== Family relationships, grief and self-knowledge ===
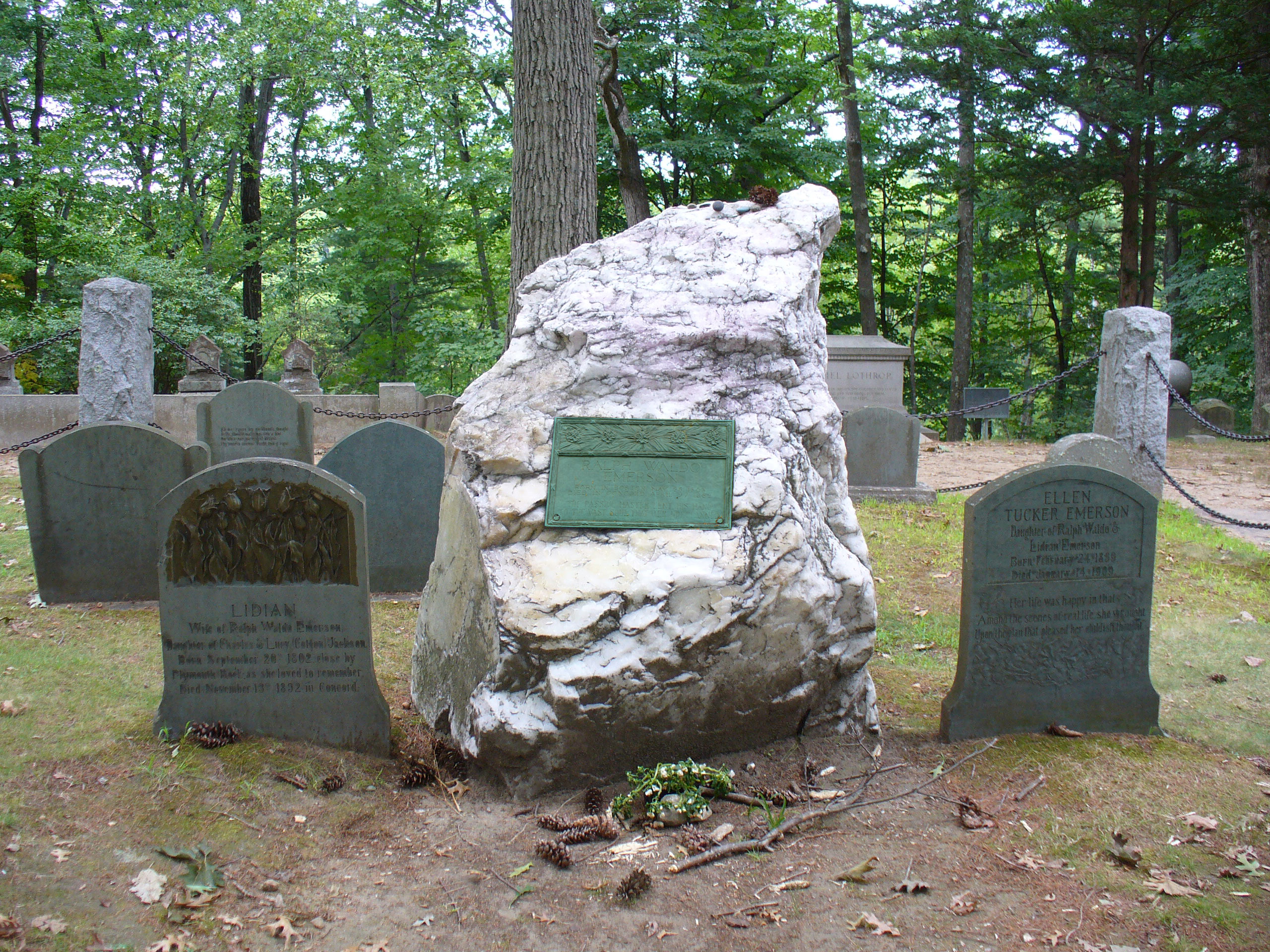
The grave of Ralph Waldo Emerson at Sleepy Hollow Cemetery in Concord, Massachusetts. His epitaph features two lines from his poem The Problem. Emerson's writings on the death of his son inspired the opening speech by Abel Vuillard in A Christmas Tale (2008).

Writing for The Criterion Collection, critic Phillip Lopate identified family relationships as a recurring concern in Arnaud Desplechin's work, contrasting his approach with the individualism of the French New Wave. He interpreted Joseph's childhood death as the source of the Vuillards' enduring resentments, particularly Elizabeth's unhappiness and hostility towards Henri. Historian François Rouquet likewise described a family shaped by mourning, rivalry, and the passage of time. He argued that the Christmas gathering permits grievances to surface and that the relatives' willingness to express hostility helps preserve their attachments without necessarily resolving their disagreements. At the 2008 Cannes Film Festival, Desplechin suggested that a new crisis could relieve existing tensions and rejected the notion that the Vuillards' strained relationships constituted a collective psychological disorder.

Desplechin traced Abel's opening reflections on bereavement to Ralph Waldo Emerson's account of his son's death in an interview with Reverse Shot. Writing in Esprit, philosopher Élise Domenach examined the sequence through Emerson's essay Experience and Stanley Cavell's interpretation of Emersonian moral perfectionism, emphasizing self-reliance and renewal after loss. She also drew parallels with William Shakespeare's The Winter's Tale, particularly the way a child's death transforms his father. Domenach further interpreted Abel's reading from Friedrich Nietzsche's On the Genealogy of Morality to Elizabeth—after ambiguously referring to her lost brother—as an exploration of grief, self-knowledge, and the characters' difficulty understanding their own motivations.

=== Parenthood and maternal love ===
The strained relationship between Junon and Henri challenges assumptions about unconditional maternal love. Desplechin told ScreenAnarchy that their mutual hostility rejects the expectation that a mother must love her children, contrasting it with the possessive father–daughter relationship in Kings and Queen (2004). He also described reversing conventional parental roles by making Abel nurturing and Junon authoritative, associating the latter with Juno and Catherine Deneuve's screen persona. At Cannes, Deneuve questioned the idea that maternal affection is instinctive, suggesting that Junon's devotion to her husband complicates her relationships with their children. Lopate contrasted Junon's emotional reserve with Abel's more forgiving disposition and Henri's provocative behaviour. He argued that the characters' frank admission of their dislike allows Junon and Henri a form of understanding without reconciliation or displays of affection.

=== Christmas traditions and reconciliation ===
Desplechin adapted the conventions of the Christmas family-reunion film from an initial idea for a French counterpart to an American Thanksgiving film. He rejected sentimental redemption and concealed family secrets in favour of conflicts made explicit early in the narrative. Lopate compared the film with The Family Stone (2005), whose family reunion also follows a matriarch's serious illness, and Ingmar Bergman's Fanny and Alexander (1982), noting Desplechin's more contentious treatment of holiday gatherings.

Desplechin cited A Midsummer Night's Dream as an influence on the film's romantic confusion, shifting relationships, and uncertain boundaries between dreams and waking life. He resisted an ending in which Henri's donation would automatically reconcile him with Junon. Rouquet compared the film's playful disruptions to those of Puck, whose epilogue is alluded to in its conclusion. The credits also acknowledge Sweeney Astray, Seamus Heaney's adaptation of Buile Shuibhne. Donald Clarke of The Irish Times noted the juxtaposition of Heaney's poetry with excerpts from The Ten Commandments (1956). Lopate observed that chapter headings, direct address, iris shots, split screens, and shadow puppetry distinguish the film from conventional family dramas. He argued that these devices sustain shifts between comedy and tragedy while drawing attention to the film's construction as fiction.

=== Chance, choice and mortality ===
Literary scholar Laurent Susini interpreted the film through Blaise Pascal's Pensées and Pascal's wager. In a scene examining Junon's prospects of survival, Claude uses mathematical probabilities, while the camera shows Laurent Thirouin's Le Hasard et les Règles, a study of chance in Pascal's thought. Susini argued that accepting or refusing treatment constitutes a wager, since neither choice escapes uncertainty. He extended this reading to Sylvia's resentment of Simon for surrendering their possible relationship without consulting her: both situations involve decisions whose consequences cannot be avoided. The contrast between attempts to calculate Junon's survival and the uncertainty of the transplant's outcome also informs this interpretation. Susini linked these dilemmas to the film's wider questions of mortality, self-knowledge, and the limits of individual control.

== Release and reception ==
A Christmas Tale premiered in competition for the Palme d'Or at the 2008 Cannes Film Festival on 16 May 2008. Two days before its premiere, IFC Films acquired United States distribution rights from Wild Bunch, marking the first sale of a film in that year's Cannes competition to a United States distributor. BAC Films released the film theatrically in France on 21 May 2008.

The film was subsequently screened at international festivals, including the 2008 Toronto International Film Festival and the BFI London Film Festival. IFC Films gave it a limited theatrical release in the United States on 14 November 2008; it was released in the United Kingdom on 16 January 2009.

In September 2009, IFC Films and The Criterion Collection announced a partnership to distribute selected IFC titles on home video in the United States, with A Christmas Tale among the first titles selected. Criterion released the film on DVD and Blu-ray on 1 December 2009.

The director-approved edition includes a restored high-definition transfer supervised by Desplechin, his 2007 documentary L'Aimée, and Arnaud's Tale, a 35-minute documentary featuring interviews with Desplechin and actors Mathieu Amalric and Catherine Deneuve. Additional features include theatrical trailers, revised English subtitles, and an essay by critic Phillip Lopate.

=== Box office ===
According to Box Office Mojo, A Christmas Tale grossed $5.22 million in France and $7.36 million worldwide. In the United States and Canada, it opened in seven theaters and earned $63,837 during its first weekend, eventually grossing $1.06 million.

=== Critical response ===
A Christmas Tale received generally positive reviews from critics, who particularly praised its ensemble performances, intricate narrative, and unconventional treatment of family relationships. On the review aggregator website Rotten Tomatoes, 86% of 131 critics' reviews are positive, with an average rating of 7.8 out of 10. The website's consensus highlights the film's dark humour and the strength of its ensemble cast. Metacritic, which uses a weighted average, assigned the film a score of 84 out of 100 based on 32 critics, indicating "universal acclaim". In France, AlloCiné reported an average rating of 4.4 out of 5 across 23 press reviews.

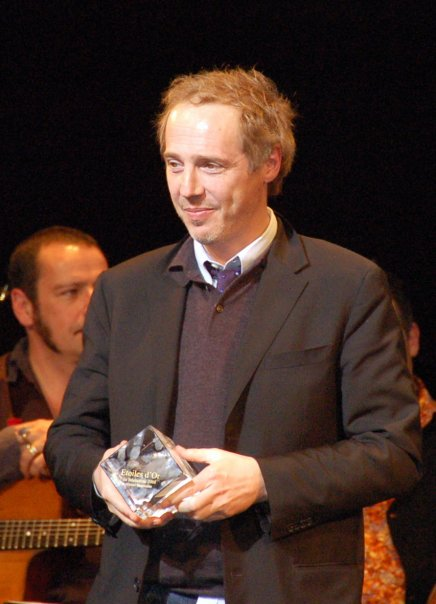
Arnaud Desplechin in 2009, the year he received the Étoile d'Or for Best Director for A Christmas Tale.

French critics were largely enthusiastic about the film. Jean-Luc Douin of Le Monde praised its uncompromising portrayal of family resentments, while Serge Kaganski of Les Inrockuptibles commended the richness of its emotional and intellectual content. Writing for Télérama, Pierre Murat praised the film's fluid ensemble storytelling and its combination of ferocity and tenderness, as well as the performances of the cast. In Screen International, Lisa Nesselson described the film as an accomplished tragicomedy, praising its casting and its intricate depiction of familial behaviour. She considered the lengthy narrative engaging even for viewers unfamiliar with Arnaud Desplechin's approach to interpersonal relationships.

American critics similarly praised the film's treatment of familiar dramatic material. Kenneth Turan of the Los Angeles Times regarded the narrative's reinvention of the conventional family-reunion drama as one of its principal achievements, commending Desplechin's ability to make an apparently familiar premise emotionally compelling. Roger Ebert praised the performers' ability to establish convincing familial relationships and observed that the film's seemingly disparate incidents gradually acquired greater significance. He also commended its shifts between comedy and serious drama, finding that Junon's composure prevented the story from becoming excessively sentimental.

Anthony Lane, writing in The New Yorker, emphasized the film's unconventional construction, particularly its incorporation of literary quotations, excerpts from other films, direct address, and visual devices associated with the French New Wave. He compared the viewing experience to discovering the history of an unfamiliar family through fragments of personal memories, noting that the Vuillards' relationships remain difficult to understand even as the film develops an affectionate portrayal of their lives. Fernando F. Croce of Slant Magazine similarly praised Desplechin's energetic direction and eclectic filmmaking techniques, although he considered the narrative more effective in its individual episodes than as a unified whole.

Other reviewers expressed reservations about the film's length and narrative complexity. Peter Bradshaw of The Guardian described its mixture of emotional conflict, theatricality, and stylized performances as difficult to interpret. Nevertheless, he found the film consistently engaging and regarded its unusual approach as worthy of further consideration. In The Observer, Philip French was less enthusiastic, describing the film as rambling and criticizing its numerous storylines for remaining insufficiently developed or connected. Scott Tobias of The A.V. Club likewise considered the film more intellectually impressive than emotionally engaging, although he praised its characterization, wit, and stylistic experimentation.

=== Critical rankings ===
A Christmas Tale appeared prominently in several critics' year-end rankings of the best films of 2008. In France, the film placed fourth in Critikat's editorial poll, with three critics naming it their favourite film of the year. In the United Kingdom, Sight and Sound ranked it joint fifth with The Class in its annual critics' poll. In the United States, it finished third in Film Comment's annual critics' poll and second in the IndieWire critics' poll, receiving 454 points from 38 voters.

The film has also appeared in retrospective rankings of Christmas cinema. In December 2023, Ryan Gilbey of The Guardian placed it 21st on his list of the 25 best Christmas films, highlighting the antagonistic relationship between Junon and Henri as a departure from conventional depictions of festive family gatherings. In a ranking updated in November 2025, Metacritic placed A Christmas Tale fifth among 38 holiday-themed films released since 2000, based on their aggregated critical scores. In January 2026, Rotten Tomatoes ranked the film 26th on its list of the 100 best Christmas films of all time, which prioritizes positive critical reception and its "Certified Fresh" designation.

The film's recognition extends beyond Christmas-themed cinema. In August 2025, Time Out ranked it 71st on its critics' list of the 100 best French films of all time.

A Christmas Tale appeared on numerous critics' year-end lists of the best films of 2008. The following rankings were compiled by Metacritic:

- 1st – Andrew O'Hehir, Salon
- 1st – Dana Stevens, Slate
- 1st – Josh Rosenblatt, The Austin Chronicle
- 1st – Rick Groen, The Globe and Mail
- 1st – Sean Axmaker, Seattle Post-Intelligencer
- 1st – Shawn Levy, The Oregonian
- 2nd – Kenneth Turan, Los Angeles Times (tied with The Class)
- 2nd – Kimberly Jones, The Austin Chronicle
- 2nd – Stephanie Zacharek, Salon
- 3rd – Michael Phillips, Chicago Tribune
- 5th – Ella Taylor, LA Weekly (tied with The Class)
- 6th – Dennis Harvey, Variety
- 7th – Scott Foundas, LA Weekly (tied with The Secret of the Grain)
- 7th – Stephen Holden, The New York Times
- 8th – Liam Lacey, The Globe and Mail
- 10th – Robert Mondello, NPR

The film also placed third in Film Comment's annual critics' poll and second in the IndieWire critics' poll, where it received 454 points from 38 mentions. The New York Film Critics Online included it among their ten best films of 2008.

=== Accolades ===
A Christmas Tale received numerous awards and nominations for its direction, screenplay, and performances. At the 34th César Awards, it earned nine nominations, including Best Film, Best Director, and Best Original Screenplay, winning Best Supporting Actor for Jean-Paul Roussillon. Arnaud Desplechin also received the Étoile d'Or for Best Director, while the film won the audience prize for Best French Film from Le Masque et la Plume.

Year	Award	Category	Recipient(s)	Result
2008	Alliance of Women Film Journalists EDA Awards	Actress Defying Age and Ageism	Catherine Deneuve	Won
2008	Cannes Film Festival	Palme d'Or	Arnaud Desplechin	Nominated
2008	European Film Awards	Prix d'Excellence (Editing)	Laurence Briaud	Nominated
2009	Critics' Choice Movie Awards	Best Foreign Language Film	A Christmas Tale	Nominated
2009	César Awards	Best Film	Arnaud Desplechin and Pascal Caucheteux	Nominated
2009	César Awards	Best Director	Arnaud Desplechin	Nominated
2009	César Awards	Best Supporting Actor	Jean-Paul Roussillon	Won
2009	César Awards	Best Supporting Actress	Anne Consigny	Nominated
2009	César Awards	Best Original Screenplay	Arnaud Desplechin and Emmanuel Bourdieu	Nominated
2009	Étoiles d'or du cinéma français	Best Director	Arnaud Desplechin	Won
2009	International Cinephile Society Awards	Best Ensemble	Ensemble cast	Won
2009	Lumières Awards	Best Film	A Christmas Tale	Nominated
2009	Lumières Awards	Best Director	Arnaud Desplechin	Nominated
2009	Le Masque et la Plume	Audience Award for Best French Film	A Christmas Tale	Won

At the 2008 Cannes Film Festival, Deneuve also received a special jury prize, jointly with Clint Eastwood, recognizing her contribution to cinema. Although the award was not specific to A Christmas Tale, she acknowledged Desplechin and her fellow cast members during her acceptance speech.

== Stage adaptation ==
In January 2020, French theatre director Julie Deliquet adapted A Christmas Tale for the stage with her theatrical company, Collectif In Vitro. The production was presented at the Odéon-Théâtre de l'Europe's Ateliers Berthier in Paris from 8 January to 2 February 2020, in association with the Festival d'Automne à Paris. The two-hour adaptation featured an ensemble of twelve performers and was subsequently presented at other theatres in France.

Deliquet, assisted by dramaturge Agathe Peyrard and actress Julie André, substantially restructured the screenplay and reduced the number of characters to accommodate the theatrical format. She conceived the project after directing an adaptation of Ingmar Bergman's Fanny and Alexander at the Comédie-Française. Desplechin welcomed the adaptation, which emphasized the original film's mixture of comedy and tragedy and its portrayal of familial conflict.

== See also ==
- List of Christmas films
