= American Star (film) =

- Theatrical release poster
- Directed by: Gonzalo López-Gallego
- Written by: Nacho Faerna
- Produced by: Michael Elliott; Ian McShane
- Starring: Ian McShane; Nora Arnezeder; Adam Nagaitis; Andrés Gertrúdix; Oscar Coleman; Sabela Arán; Thomas Kretschmann; Fanny Ardant
- Cinematography: José David Montero
- Edited by: Gonzalo López-Gallego
- Music by: Remate
- Production companies: Tamariska; Emu Films
- Distributed by: Vertigo Releasing
- Release dates: January 26, 2024 (United States); February 23, 2024 (United Kingdom)
- Running time: 107 minutes
- Country: United Kingdom
- Language: English
- Box office: $15,849

American Star is a 2024 British thriller film directed by Gonzalo López-Gallego, written by Nacho Faerna, and produced by Ian McShane and Michael Elliott. The film stars McShane, Thomas Kretschmann, Nora Arnezeder, Adam Nagaitis, Fanny Ardant, and Oscar Coleman.

American Star was released in theatres and also digitally on 26 January 2024 in the United States by IFC Films, and in the United Kingdom on 23 February 2024 by Vertigo Releasing.

== Plot ==
Wilson, an aging hitman who grows tired of his violent life, heads to Fuerteventura for a job. His target's absence leads him to a tranquil vacation, where he befriends Gloria, a bartender, and forms unexpected connections with the island's residents. As Wilson lets his guard down, the inevitable return to his profession disrupts the peaceful interlude.

== Cast ==
- Ian McShane as Wilson
- Thomas Kretschmann as Thomas
- Nora Arnezeder as Gloria
- Adam Nagaitis as Ryan
- Fanny Ardant as Anne
- Andrés Gertrúdix as Cowboy
- Sabela Arán as Linda
- Oscar Coleman as Max

== Production ==
The film was produced by both Ian McShane and Michael Elliott. It is a production by UK outfits Tamariska and Emu Films in association with Madrid-based Aquí y Allí Films and Cayuga Ficción.

Principal photography took place on the Canary Islands.

On 12 December 2023, the trailer for American Star was released by IFC Films.

== Release ==
American Star was screened in New York City on 18 January 2024. It was released in the United States on 26 January 2024 and in the United Kingdom on 23 February 2024, and was broadcast on free-to-air channel Film4 in the UK in July 2026.

== Reception ==
On the review aggregator website Rotten Tomatoes, 78% of 32 critics' reviews are positive, with an average rating of 6.6/10. The website's consensus reads: "Thanks in large part to the ever-watchable Ian McShane, American Star entertains as a slow-burning albeit somewhat standard thriller." Metacritic, which uses a weighted average, assigned the film a score of 66 out of 100, based on 10 critics, indicating "generally favorable" reviews.

Matt Zoller Seitz of RogerEbert.com rated the film 3 out of 4 stars, deeming it to be an "unusually intelligent and purposeful movie that doesn't say much, but is full of feeling".

Leslie Felperin, for the The Guardian film review, rated it 3 out of 5 stars, praising McShane's "fantastic chemistry" with his co-stars.
