= Nos 18 ans =

- Directed by: Frédéric Berthe
- Screenplay by: Éric Assous
- Based on: Notte prima degli esami by Fausto Brizzi; Massimiliano Bruno; Marco Martani
- Produced by: Marie-Jeanne Pascal
- Starring: Théo Frilet; Valentine Catzéflis
- Cinematography: Pavans de Ceccatty Philippe
- Edited by: Célia Lafitedupont
- Music by: Arnaud Matteï
- Distributed by: TFM Distribution
- Release date: 16 July 2008 (France)
- Running time: 93 minutes
- Country: France
- Language: French
- Budget: $6.8 million
- Box office: $4 million

Nos 18 ans is a French comedy teen film directed by Frédéric Berthe and released in 2008. It is a remake of the 2006 Italian film Notte prima degli esami ("Night Before the Exams") written and directed by Fausto Brizzi. Alternative titles for the film include School's Out.

== Plot ==
The depicts the lives of two groups of French teenagers in 1989 during their preparation for Baccalauréat, and features a number of homages to the 1980s.

== Cast ==
- Théo Frilet as Lucas
- Valentine Catzéflis as Clémence
- Michel Blanc as the teacher Martineau
- Arthur Dupont as Maxime
- Julia Piaton as Sarah
- Liza Manili as Alice
- Pierre Boulanger as Richard
- Bernadette Lafont as Adèle
- Venantino Venantini as Marcello
- Maruschka Detmers as Clémence's mother
- Iris Besse as Valentine
- Annabel Rohmer as Clarisse
- Bartholomew Bouteillis as Yvan
- Pierre Niney as Loïc
- Lucy Ferry as Laura
- Aurélie Cabrero as Princess Leia
- Sylvain Levitte as Edgar Le Prince
- Sébastien Houbani as "Michael Jackson"
- Eric Naggar as the principal
- Xavier Gallais as the gynaecologist
- Roger Contebardo as Werner

== Soundtrack ==
The soundtrack includes many hits evoking the 1980s:

- Yelle: "Nos 18 ans"
- The Cure: "Close to me"
- Telephone: "Ca c'est vraiment toi"
- S'express: "Theme from s'express"
- Simply Red: "If you don't know me by now"
- 10cc: "I'm not in love"
- The Buggles: "Video Killed the Radio Star"
- Marino Marini: "Come Prima"
- Metiswing: "De cuba trango este son"
- Dexys Midnight Runners: "Come on Eileen"
- Mano Negra: "Mala Vida"
- Wham!: "Wake Me Up Before You Go-Go"
- David Bowie: "Modern love"
- Rickie Lee Jones: "On Saturday Afternoon in 1963"
- The Beautiful South: "Song for whoever"
- The Jam: "Town called Malice"
- Les Rita Mitsouko: "Andy"

== See also ==
- List of French films of 2008
