= Ursula Werner =

German actress (born 1943)

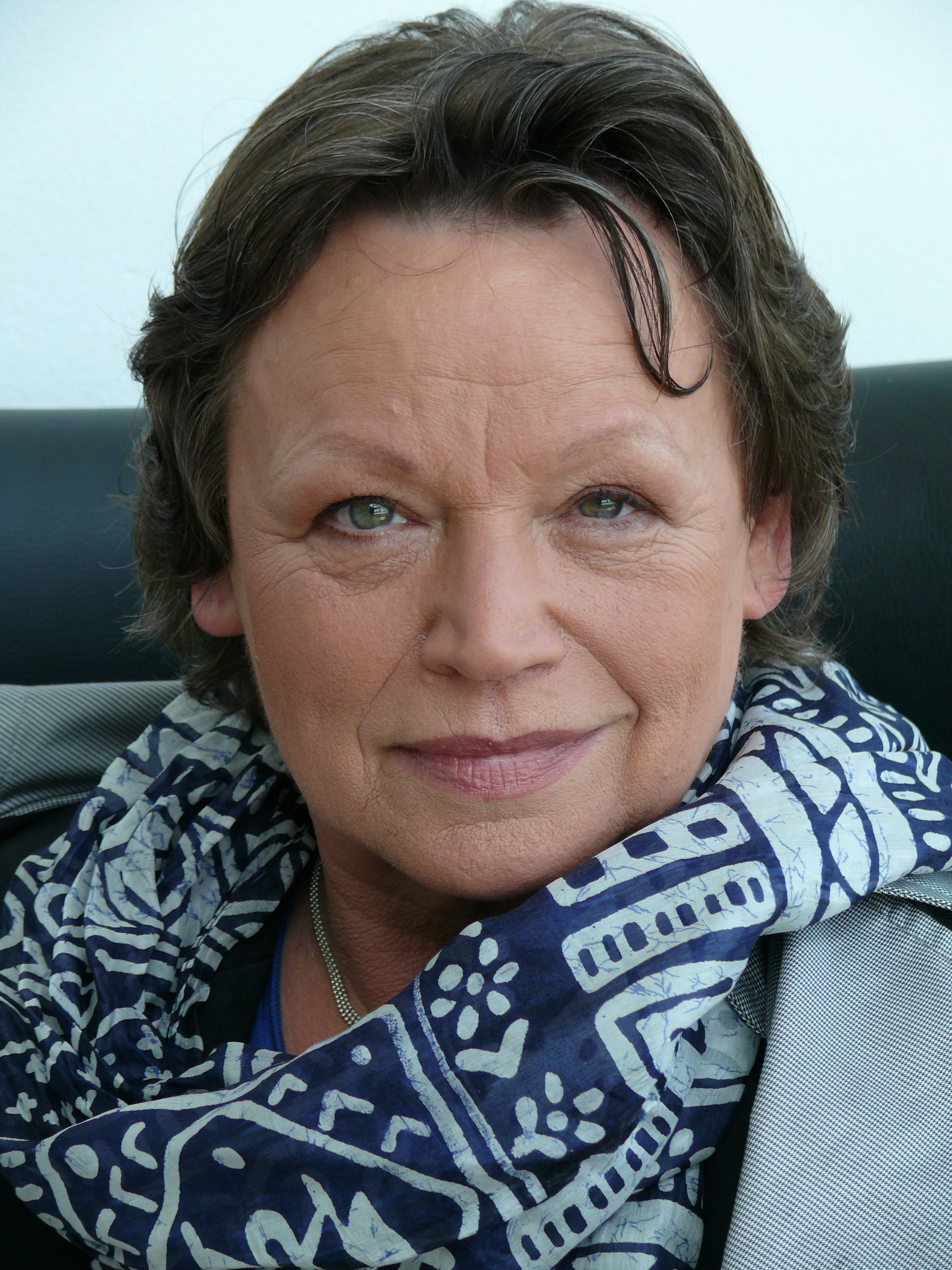
- Werner in 2008
- Born: 28 September 1943 (age 81); Eberswalde, Germany
- Occupation: Actress
- Website: ursula-werner.de

Ursula Werner (German pronunciation: [ˈʊʁzula ˈvɛʁnɐ]; born 28 September 1943) is a German actress.

== Biography ==
Born in Eberswalde, Werner grew up in the Prenzlauer Berg district of Berlin. After studying at the Staatliche Schauspielschule Berlin (Berlin State Drama College), she obtained her first roles in the Halle Opera House, and in the Berlin cabaret "Die Distel".

From 1974 to 2009, Werner was a permanent member of the Maxim-Gorki-Theater in Berlin. She also made guest appearances on the Gorki stage. She is particularly remembered for her role of Dr. Unglaube in the 1977 film Ein irrer Duft von frischem Heu ("A Terrific Scent of Fresh Hay"). From 2001 to 2007, she played a permanent secondary character in the Schloss Einstein series.

Following several minor roles in film and on TV, she took the leading role for Andreas Dresen's 2008 film Wolke 9 ("Cloud 9") where she played the part of a woman in her late sixties who leaves her older husband for an even older man. For this unusual role, Werner received the 2009 German Film Award (Lola) for the best female leading role.

Werner lives in Berlin. Her next film, Wintervater, where she plays the role of Lene, is in post-production and will be released in 2011.

== Filmography ==
=== Films ===
Her film credits most notably include Cloud 9, Am anderen Ende, Willenbrock, Policewoman and Insel der Schwäne.

- 1962: Wind von vorn
- 1967: Frau Venus und ihr Teufel
- 1969: Seine Hoheit: Genosse Prinz
- 1970: Netzwerk
- 1970: Fiete Stein
- 1970: Weil ich dich liebe
- 1973: Zement
- 1974: Der nackte Mann auf dem Sportplatz
- 1976: Die Trauerrede und andere heitere Begebenheiten
- 1976: Ein altes Modell
- 1977: Ein irrer Duft von frischem Heu
- 1977: Unterwegs nach Atlantis
- 1978: Ein Kolumbus auf der Havel
- 1980: Glück im Hinterhaus
- 1981: Bürgschaft für ein Jahr
- 1983: Insel der Schwäne
- 1984: Ich liebe Victor
- 1984: Drei Schwestern
- 1985: Meine Frau Inge und meine Frau Schmidt
- 1985: Der verzauberte Weihnachtsmann
- 1986: Die Herausforderung
- 1987: Vater gesucht
- 1987: Jan Oppen
- 1987: Märchenzirkus
- 1988: Stunde der Wahrheit
- 1989: Grüne Hochzeit
- 1990: König Phantasios
- 1991: Scheusal
- 1991: Lord Hansi
- 2000: Policewoman
- 2002: Hundsköpfe
- 2004: Saniyes Lust
- 2004: Oegeln
- 2004: Land's End
- 2005: Willenbrock
- 2008: Narrenspiel
- 2008: Cloud 9
- 2008: Über Wasser gehen
- 2009: Am anderen Ende
- 2012: Two Lives
- 2013: Sisters
- 2018: All About Me

=== Television ===
Her television credits include Schloss Einstein and Einzug ins Paradies.

- 1975: Broddi
- 1975–1989: Polizeiruf 110: Ein Fall ohne Zeugen
- 1978: Polizeiruf 110: Schuldig
- 1987: Einzug ins Paradies
- 1989: Polizeiruf 110: Drei Flaschen Tokajer
- 2001: Liebesau: Die andere Heimat
- 2001–2007: Schloss Einstein
- 2019: Hanna

== Awards ==
- 1989 Goethepreis der Stadt Berlin
  (Goethe Prize of the City-State of Berlin)
- 2008 Nominierungen für den Bambi 2008 als beste Schauspielerin International und Europäischen Filmpreis 2008 als Beste Darstellerin für Wolke Neun
  (Nominated for the Bambi Award as Best Female Performer-International and Best Actress at the European Film Awards for Cloud 9)
- 2008 Prix Tudor Best Female Performance in Geneva Cinéma Tout Ecran
  (Prix Tudor for Best Female Performance at the Geneva Cinéma Tout Ecran)
- 2008 "Coup de Coeur" at the Internationalen Filmfestspielen von Cannes.
  (Coup de Coeur at the Cannes Film Festival)
- 2008 Bayerischer Filmpreis as Beste Darstellerin für Wolke Neun
  (Best Actress at the Bavarian Film Festival for Cloud 9)
- 2009: Deutscher Filmpreis 2009 as Beste Hauptdarstellerin für Wolke Neun.
  (Best Actress in a starring role for Cloud 9-German Film Awards 2009)
