= Love Me No More (film) =

2008 French drama film

- Film poster
- Directed by: Jean Becker
- Screenplay by: Éric Assous; François d'Épenoux; Jean Becker; Jérôme Beaujour
- Based on: Deux jours à tuer by François d'Épenoux
- Produced by: Louis Becker
- Starring: Albert Dupontel; Marie-Josée Croze; Pierre Vaneck
- Cinematography: Arthur Cloquet
- Edited by: Jacques Witta
- Music by: Alain Goraguer
- Production companies: ICE3; StudioCanal; France 2 Cinéma
- Distributed by: StudioCanal
- Release date: 30 April 2008
- Running time: 85 minutes
- Country: France
- Language: French
- Budget: $8.8 million
- Box office: $10.9 million

Love Me No More (French: Deux jours à tuer) is a 2008 French drama film directed by Jean Becker.

== Plot ==
Antoine Méliot is an advertising executive who lives with his wife and their two children. Following an accusation of infidelity, he abruptly changes his behavior and begins distancing himself from his family and friends. Over the following two days, he disrupts a meeting with a client, behaves antagonistically toward his family, and withdraws from his friends. He then leaves the region and travels to Ireland to stay with his father, whom he has not seen for some time. It is revealed that Méliot has terminal cancer and has deliberately disrupted his relationships and personal life in an attempt to spare his family the grief of his impending death. Before his death, he asks his father to visit his wife and explain the reasons for his actions.

== Cast ==
- Albert Dupontel - Antoine Méliot
- Marie-Josée Croze - Cécile Méliot
- Pierre Vaneck - Antoines Vater
- Cristiana Reali - Virginie
- Mathias Mlekuz - Éric
- Claire Nebout - Clara
- François Marthouret - Paul
- Anne Loiret - Anne-Laure
- Daphné Bürki - Bérengère
- Samuel Labarthe - Étienne
- Jean Dell - Mortez
- Guillaume de Tonquédec - Sébastien
- Marie-Christine Adam - Cécile's mother
- Alessandra Martines - Marion

== Accolades ==
Award / Film Festival	Category	Recipients and nominees	Result
César Awards	Best Actor	Albert Dupontel	Nominated
César Awards	Best Supporting Actor	Pierre Vaneck	Nominated
César Awards	Best Adaptation	Éric Assous, Jérôme Beaujour, Jean Becker and François d'Épenoux	Nominated
Globes de Cristal Award	Best Film		Nominated
Globes de Cristal Award	Best Actor	Albert Dupontel	Nominated
Lumière Awards	Best Actor	Albert Dupontel	Nominated
Prix Jacques Prévert du Scénario	Best Adaptation	Éric Assous, Jérôme Beaujour, Jean Becker and François d'Épenoux	Nominated
