= Tin Soldier (film) =

2025 film by Brad Furman

- Release poster
- Directed by: Brad Furman
- Screenplay by: Brad Furman; Jess Fuerst; Pablo Fenjves
- Story by: Brad Furman; Jess Fuerst
- Produced by: Steven Chasman; Keith Kjarval; Brad Furman; Jess Fuerst; Jim Seibel; Christopher Milburn; Brad Feinstein
- Starring: Scott Eastwood; John Leguizamo; Nora Arnezeder; Jamie Foxx; Robert De Niro
- Cinematography: Tim Maurice-Jones
- Edited by: Jarrett Fijal
- Music by: Chris Hajian
- Production companies: Samuel Goldwyn Films; Unified Pictures; Current Entertainment; Road Less Traveled
- Distributed by: Amazon MGM Studios
- Release dates: May 29, 2025 (Russia); September 12, 2025 (United States)
- Running time: 86 minutes
- Country: United States
- Language: English

Tin Soldier (titled onscreen as The Tin Soldier) is a 2025 American action thriller film directed by Brad Furman, written by Furman, Jess Fuerst, and Pablo Fenjves. It stars Scott Eastwood, John Leguizamo, Nora Arnezeder, Jamie Foxx, and Robert De Niro. Filmed in 2022, it was released in 2025, and was overwhelmingly disliked by critics.

== Plot ==
Tin Soldier is an action-thriller film about a former soldier who infiltrates a dangerous cult led by a charismatic leader (Foxx) to rescue his wife and confront his past. The film follows Eastwood’s character, Nash Cavanaugh, as he teams up with military operative (De Niro) to take down the cult known as “The Bokushi”, which preys on army veterans.

== Cast ==
- Scott Eastwood as Nash Cavanaugh
- John Leguizamo as Luke Dunn
- Nora Arnezeder as Evoli Carmichael
- Jamie Foxx as The Bokushi aka Leon K. Prudhomme
- Robert De Niro as Emmanuel Ashburn
- Shamier Anderson as Kivon Jackson
- Yul Vazquez as Lawrence Kollock
- Rita Ora as Mama Suki
- Saïd Taghmaoui as Atlas
- Alexa Feinstein as Callie
- Eire Farrell as Colleen
- Xen Sams as Talia Fields
- Laurence Mason as Shinja John

== Production ==
In May 2022, it was announced that Jamie Foxx, Robert De Niro, Scott Eastwood, John Leguizamo, and Shamier Anderson were cast in the film. The following month, it was reported that Rita Ora, Nora Arnezeder, Saïd Taghmaoui and Joey Bicicchi were added to the cast. On November 2, 2022, it was revealed that Chris Hajian would compose the score for the film.

The production was filmed in Greece, beginning in Thessaloniki in May 2022 and continuing in Drama in June 2022, with Tim Maurice-Jones serving as the cinematographer.

== Release ==
In May 2025, Samuel Goldwyn Films acquired North American distribution rights to the film. It was released as a limited release in Russia on May 29, 2025. The film was released in the UK through Amazon MGM Studios on July 23, 2025, and in the United States on September 12, 2025. A digital release followed on September 30.

== Reception ==
On the review aggregator website Rotten Tomatoes, 8% of 12 critics' reviews are positive. Jeffrey M. Anderson of Common Sense Media awarded the film one star out of five. Leslie Felperin of The Guardian gave the film a score of two out of five, writing "this action thriller is a mangled, dreary, unlovely mess and so much less than the sum of its parts". The review at FandomWire gave it a 'Horrible' rating, stating that it "wastes an A-list cast on one of the most incoherent and flawed action films in recent memory."
