= Entre les murs (novel) =

Novel by François Bégaudeau

Entre les Murs (English: Between the walls) is a work of contemporary fiction by French writer François Bégaudeau. It is a semi-autobiographical account of Bégaudeau's experiences as a literature teacher in an inner city middle school in Paris.

Published in 2006, it won the Prix France Culture/Télérama. In 2008, it was adapted to film by Laurent Cantet, also called Entre les murs; this film received the Palme d'Or at the 2008 Cannes Film Festival. The English-language version of Entre les murs was published in April 2009 by Seven Stories Press under the title The Class.

== Bibliographical information ==
- Entre les murs , Éditions Verticales, 2006, ISBN 2-07-077691-3.
