= Pierre Boulanger =

French actor (born 1987)

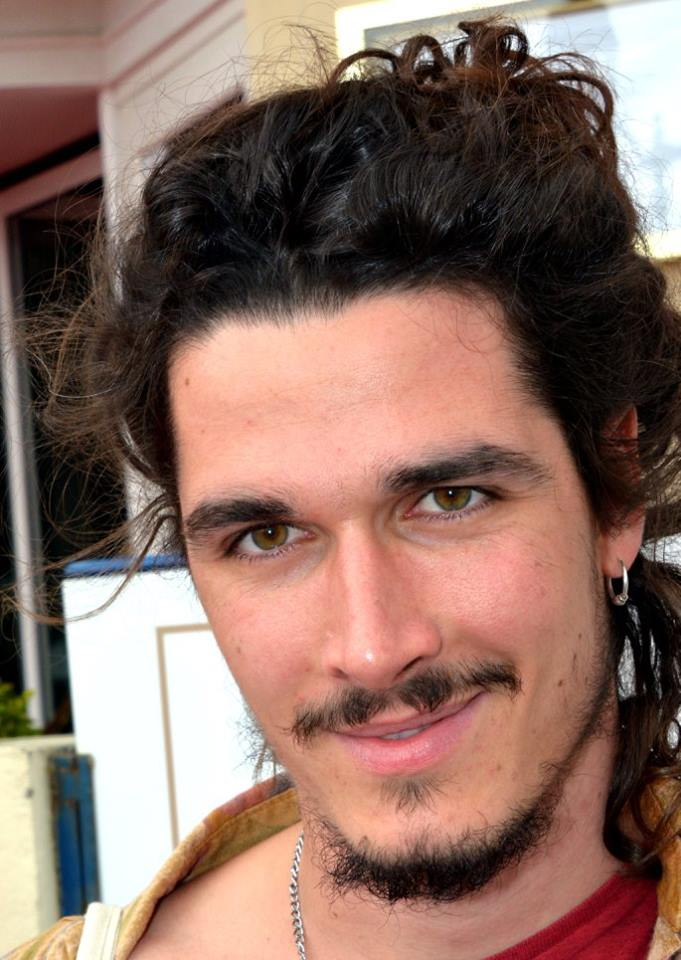
- Born: 8 August 1987 (age 38); Paris, France
- Years active: 2003—present

Pierre Boulanger (born 8 August 1987) is a French actor. He is known for the 2003 film Monsieur Ibrahim, where he played a young Jewish boy, Moises "Momo" Schmidt and for 2008 film Nos 18 ans where he played Richard. The young actor was then reported to be concentrating on his studies, and thus was not able to do movies. After two years, he did TV appearances and minor roles in movies. He is best known for his first major English film in 2011, Monte Carlo with Selena Gomez.

== Filmography ==
- Paye ta robe (2019, short) as Pierre- also director and writer
- Entebbe (2018) as Maurice Elbaz
- Bye Bye les puceaux (2018, short) Director and writer
- White Spirit (2017, short) as La Noir
- Nuit froide (2017, short) Director and writer
- Road Games (2015) as Thierry
- Rendez-Vous (English language title - Obsession) (2015) as Michel
- Service de nettoyage (2015, short) as Louis
- Les révoltés (2014) as Antione
- Richelieu: La pourpre et le sang (2014, TV film) as Marquis de Cinq Mars
- God Help the Girl (2014) as Anton
- La Source (TV series) as Simon Dubois (2013, 5 episodes)
- Trap for Cinderella (2013) as Jean Claude
- Fais pas ci, fais pas ça (TV series) as Orson (2011, 1 episode)
- The Unlikely Girl (2012) as Luc
- Arrête de pleurer Pénélope (2012) as Justin
- Le sang de la vigne (TV Series) as Jonas (2011, 1 episode)
- Brassens, la mauvaise réputation (2011, TV film) as Loulou Bestiou
- Monte Carlo (2011) as Theo Marchand
- Chez Maupassant (TV series) as Le soldat blessé (2011, 1 episode)
- Nos 18 ans (2008) as Richard
- Camarades (2007)
- Camping paradis (2006) as David
- Commissaire Cordier (2006) as Maxime
- Grain de sel (2006) as Maxime
- Poids plume (2005)
- Sauveur Giordano (2005) as Maxime Levain
- L'envers du décor (2005) as Maxime Levain
- Le Proc (2005) as Damien Flamand
- Danger Public (2005) as Damien Flamand
- Les visages d'Alice (2005) as Pierre
- Le Grand vent (2004) as Antoine
- Dans la tête du tueur (2004) as Kevin
- Louis Page (2004) as François
- Un vieil ami (2004) as François
- Monsieur Ibrahim as Momo (2003) - featuring Omar Sharif
