= Liza Manili =

French actress and singer (born 1986)

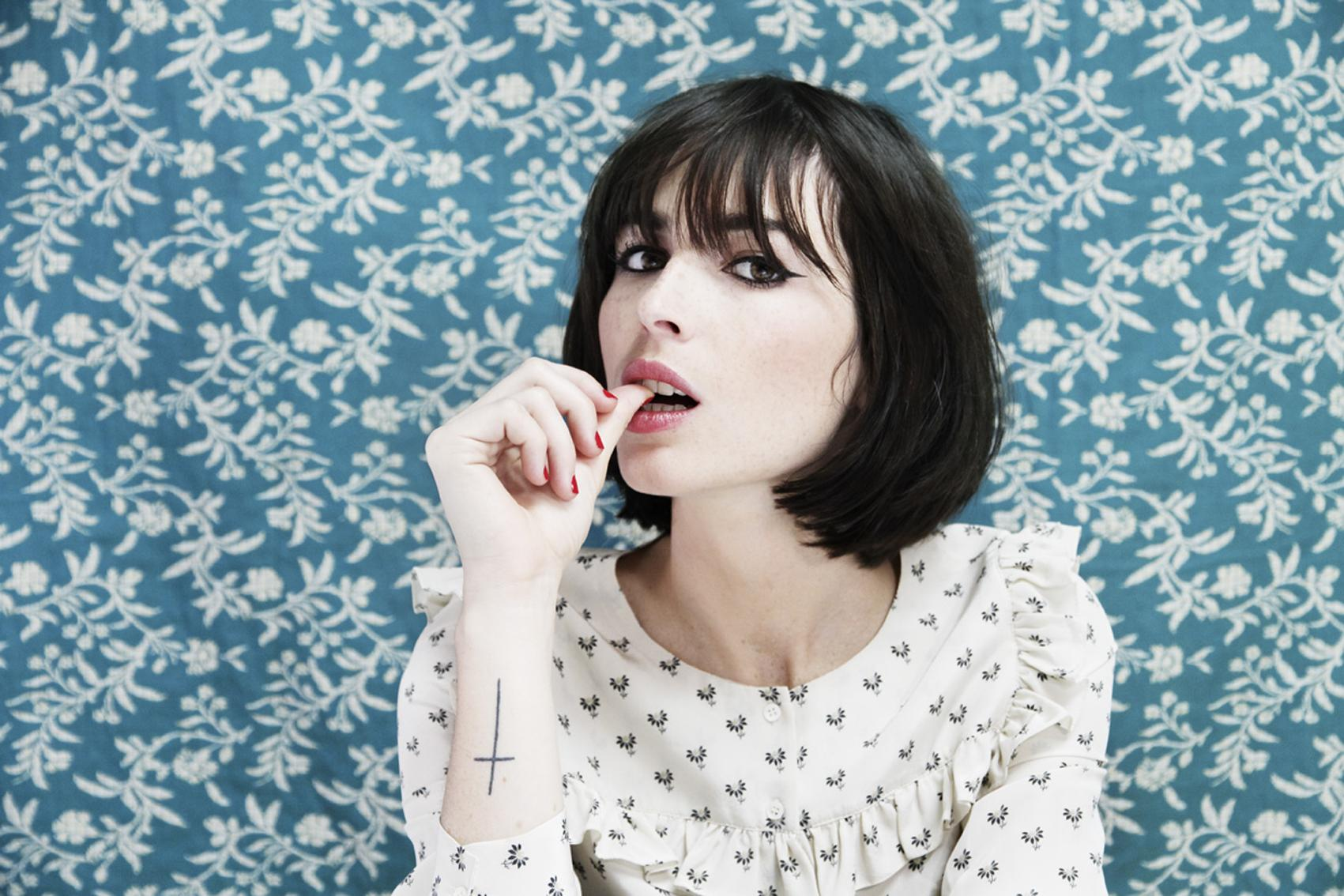
- Liza Manili in 2012
- Born: 17 July 1986 (age 40); Strasbourg, France
- Occupations: Actress, singer

Liza Manili is a French actress and singer, born in 1986 in Strasbourg. At 16 she began modeling before turning to films. She signed with EMI's record label in 2011. Her first album, produced by Séverin and Julien Delfaud, was released on 4 June 2012. The album was recorded in Paris at Studio Gang, the legendary studio of Michel Berger.

== Filmography ==
Year	Film	Director
2004	Sad Day	Marc Maggiori
2006	Petits meurtres en famille	Edwin Baily
2007	Madame Hollywood	
2008	Nos 18 ans	Frédéric Berthe
2009	Le Bon Numéro	Julien Weil
2010	Docteur Tom	Tristan Carné

== Discography ==
- 2009: Appeared on Séverin's album Cheesecake, song Les restes
- 2010: Docteur Tom (musical), song Le Verdict
- 2011: Christopher Williams / Non Non / Le Petit Train (EP)
- 2012: L'Eclipse (single)
- 2012: Liza Manili (début album)
