= Einzug ins Paradies =

- Country of origin: East Germany

Einzug ins Paradies was a six-part East German television series, which dealt with the lives of five families who moved into a newly constructed apartment building.

== See also ==
- List of German television series
