= Direct address =

Direct address may refer to:

- Noun of address, a term or phrase used to directly address an individual
- The direct addressing mode in computer programming
- Breaking the fourth wall in theatre
- An epistolary essay in literature
