= Nora Arnezeder =

French actress (born 1989)

- Arnezeder in 2026
- Born: 8 May 1989 (age 37); Paris, France
- Education: Cours Florent
- Occupation: Actress
- Years active: 2006–present

Nora Arnezeder (born 8 May 1989) is a French actress. She is known for her roles in the science fiction thriller film Tides (2021), the zombie heist film Army of the Dead (2021) and IFC's assassin thriller American Star (2024).

== Early life ==
Nora Arnezeder was born on 8 May 1989 in Paris, France. Her father Wolfgang Arnezeder is Austrian and Catholic, her mother, Piera Schinasi, is a Jewish Egyptian of Sephardic Jewish descent. While she was in high school, Arnezeder studied acting, dancing and singing at the drama school of Cours Florent.

== Career ==
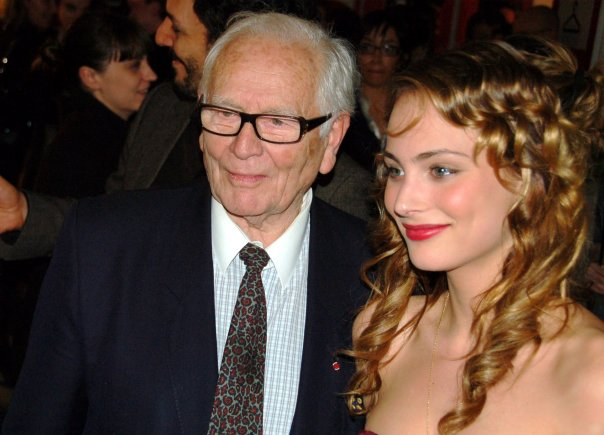
Pierre Cardin and Nora Arnezeder at the 2009 Golden Stars of French Cinema (Étoile d'Or Awards)

Arnezeder's first major role was in 2008 in Paris 36 (French: Faubourg 36) directed by Christophe Barratier; for which she won the 2009 Lumière Award for Most Promising Actress, as well as an Étoile d'Or Award (Golden Stars of French Cinema). In the film Arnezeder performed the song "Loin de Paname", that was nominated for the Best Original Song at the 82nd Academy Awards.

In 2009, Arnezeder was the face of Guerlain's fragrance L'Idylle.

In 2012, Arnezeder appeared in the American action thriller film Safe House, portraying the girlfriend of Ryan Reynolds' character. In the same year she appeared in the role of Celia in the American mystery drama film The Words, which was presented at the Sundance Film Festival. In the same year, Arnezeder starred in the horror slasher film Maniac.

In 2013, she was the leading actress in the period drama adventure film Angélique directed by Ariel Zeitoun. She appeared as Chloe Tousignant, a French intelligence investigator, in the main cast of the first two seasons (2015–17) of the CBS series Zoo.

Arnezeder appeared in 6 episodes, between 2014 and 2018, of the series Mozart in the Jungle, playing Anna Maria.

She played the main role of Evelyn Rey in the single season of the YouTube Premium (formerly YouTube Red) science fiction series Origin (2018).

In 2021, Arnezeder played Lilly "The Coyote" in Zack Snyder's Netflix film Army of the Dead. She was also cast as Françoise Glazer in the Paramount+ miniseries The Offer.

She starred in the 2021 English-language German-Swiss science fiction thriller film Tides (The Colony), playing the lead role of Blake.

== Filmography ==
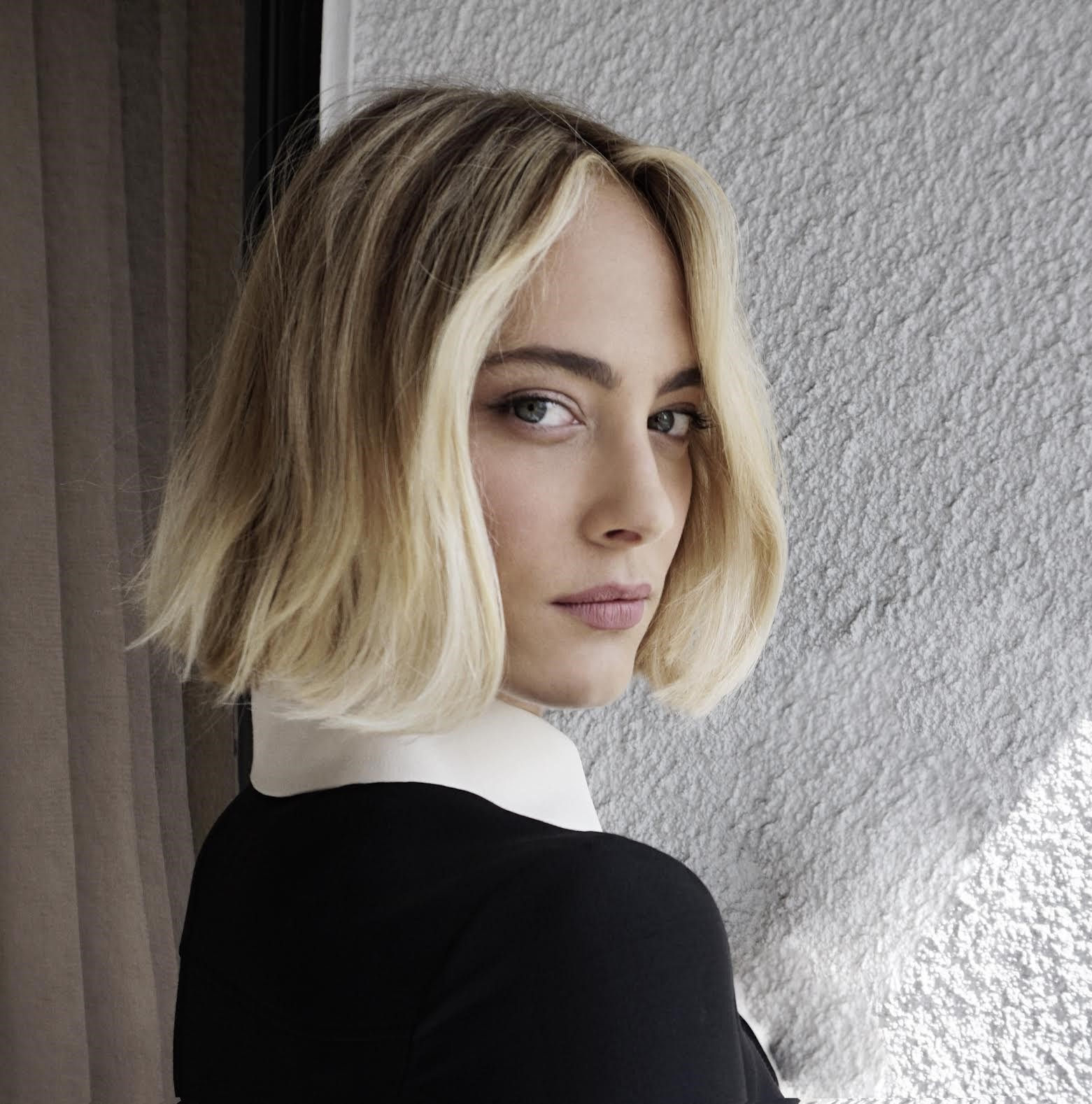
Arnezeder in 2021

Year	Title	Role	Notes
2006	Commissaire Valence	Chloé	
2007	Les deux mondes	Lyri	
2008	Faubourg 36	Douce	First major role
2011	Louis la Chance	Katia (voice)	
2011	La croisière	Chloé	
2012	What the Day Owes the Night	Émilie	Major role
2012	The Words	Celia	
2012	Maniac	Anna	
2012	Safe House	Ana Moreau	
2013	Angélique	Angélique	First lead role
2014	Fiston	Sandra	
2014	Mozart in the Jungle	Anna Maria	TV series; seasons 1–2, 4, recurring
2014	Inside Me	Madeleine	Short film
2015–2016	Zoo	Chloe Tousignant	TV series, seasons 1–2
2017	Riviera	Nadia	TV series
2018	In the Cloud	Z	
2018	Origin	Evelyn Rey	TV series, Main role
2020	Here After	Honey Bee	Lead role
2021	Army of the Dead	Lilly "The Coyote"	
2021	Blast	Sonia	Lead role
2021	Tides (The Colony)	Louise Blake	Lead role
2022	The Offer	Francoise Glazer	Mini-series
2022	Le Musk	Juliet	Lead role
2022	Leopard Skin	Sierra Loba	TV series, Main role
2024	American Star	Gloria	
2025	Tin Soldier	Evoli Carmichael	

== See also ==
- List of French Jews
- List of French Academy Award winners and nominees
- List of Jewish Academy Award winners and nominees
