= Cloud 9 (2008 film) =

- Film poster
- German: Wolke Neun
- Directed by: Andreas Dresen
- Produced by: Peter Rommel
- Starring: Ursula Werner; Horst Rehberg; Horst Westphal
- Cinematography: Michael Hammon
- Edited by: Jörg Hauschild
- Release date: 17 May 2008 (CFF)
- Running time: 98 minutes
- Country: Germany
- Language: German

Cloud 9 (German: Wolke Neun) is a 2008 German drama film directed by Andreas Dresen and starring Ursula Werner, Horst Rehberg, and Horst Westphal. The story focuses on love and sex in old age and had its world premiere at the 2008 Cannes Film Festival, where it won the Heart Throb Jury Prize from the Un Certain Regard jury. The title is an Anglicism of the phrase "cloud nine".

== Cast ==
- Ursula Werner - Inge
- Horst Rehberg - Werner
- Horst Westphal - Karl
- Steffi Kühnert - Petra

== Reception ==
On the review aggregator website Rotten Tomatoes, 89% of 44 critics' reviews are positive, with an average rating of 6.9/10. The website's consensus reads: "A raw, intimate and emotional insight into romance for the superannuated featuring taboo-breaking insight into the sex-lives of the over 60s."
