= With a Little Help from Myself =

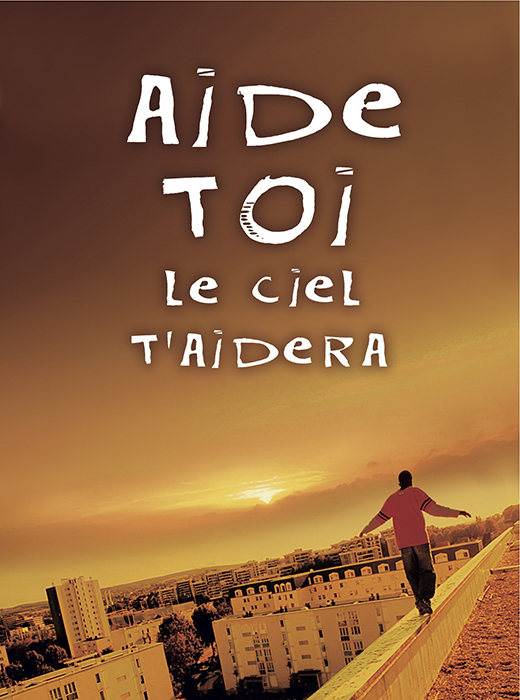
- Film poster
- Directed by: François Dupeyron
- Written by: François Dupeyron
- Produced by: Laurent Pétin; Michèle Pétin
- Starring: Félicité Wouassi; Claude Rich
- Cinematography: Yves Angelo
- Edited by: Dominique Faysse
- Production company: ARP Sélection
- Distributed by: ARP Sélection
- Release date: 26 November 2008
- Running time: 94 minutes
- Country: France
- Language: French
- Budget: $3.6 million
- Box office: $820.000

With a Little Help from Myself (French: Aide-toi, le ciel t'aidera) is a 2008 French comedy-drama film written and directed by François Dupeyron. The film received four nominations at the 14th Lumière Awards and won Best Director for Dupeyron.

== Cast ==
- Félicité Wouassi as Sonia
- Claude Rich as Robert
- Ralph Amoussou as Victor
- Charles-Etienne N'Diaye as Léo
- Mata Gabin as Marijo
- Jacky Ido as Fer
- Carole Franck as The Inspector
