= Mesrine (2008 film) =

2008 French biographical crime film

- Theatrical poster
- Directed by: Jean-François Richet
- Written by: Abdel Raouf Dafri; Jean-François Richet
- Produced by: Thomas Langmann; André Rouleau; Maxime Rémillard
- Starring: Vincent Cassel
- Cinematography: Robert Gantz
- Edited by: Part One: Stéphane Garnier; Hervé Schneid; Part Two: Bill Pankow; Hervé Schneid
- Music by: Marco Beltrami; Marcus Trumpp
- Distributed by: Pathé (France and Switzerland); Alliance Films (Canada and United Kingdom)
- Release dates: 22 October 2008 (Part One); 19 November 2008 (Part Two)
- Running time: 246 minutes Part One: 113 minutes Part Two: 133 minutes
- Countries: France; Canada
- Languages: French; Spanish; English
- Budget: $50 million
- Box office: $46.3 million

Mesrine is a two-part 2008 French biographical crime film on the life of French gangster Jacques Mesrine, directed by Jean-François Richet and written by Abdel Raouf Dafri and Richet. The first part, L'instinct de mort, was based on Mesrine's autobiographical book L'instinct de mort, while the second part, L'ennemi public No 1, detailed Mesrine's criminal career. The film has earned comparisons to the American film Scarface, and Vincent Cassel earned rave reviews for his portrayal of Mesrine.

The film is divided into two parts, with various titles:

1. Mesrine: L'instinct de mort (French for "Mesrine: Instinct for Death"); known in English as Public Enemy Number One (Part One), Mesrine: Part 1 - Death Instinct and Mesrine: Killer Instinct
2. Mesrine: L'ennemi public No 1 (French for "Mesrine: Public Enemy No. 1"); known in English as Public Enemy Number One (Part Two), Mesrine: Part 2 - Public Enemy #1 and Mesrine: Public Enemy Number One

== Plot ==
=== Part 1 ===
Part 1 depicts Mesrine's life from 1959 to 1972, beginning with his time as a member of the French Army during the Algerian War, where he was forced to shoot and kill prisoners and bomb-makers. On his return to France, he moves into his parents' home, where he reunites with his mother and his father. After an argument about getting an honest job, he meets with his old childhood friend, Paul, who is wealthy now and drives a sports car. They soon get into robbery business with Paul's boss, Guido, and from him, he obtains a Citroën DS as a loan. Later, Guido and Mesrine kill Ahmed, an Arab pimp who beat up Sarah (one of his girls and Mesrine's girlfriend), and bury him in the countryside and drive off.

Using Guido's status as a local crime boss as protection from their enemies, after committing some robberies, Paul and Mesrine briefly leave France for the Canary Islands, where Mesrine meets and falls in love with Sofia, who moves to France with him, and they marry. However, although they have a daughter, and later two sons, Mesrine continues to be in the robbery business, causing him to get arrested and sent to prison in late 1960. He is released in 1962, and although tries to keep a steady job and be honest, he is fired during an economic downturn, and dreams of easy money get him back into 'the business'. One night, Guido and Paul arrive and Mesrine prepares to leave with them, but Sofia yells at him and tells him that she will call the police, on which Mesrine snaps, slaps her, drags her across the stairs, and shoves a gun into her mouth and threatens her in front of Guido and Paul before departing. Later they divorce, leaving him custody of the children.

In 1966, Mesrine, now a gangster, goes into a bar. A woman named Jeanne Schneider comes on to him and the pair quickly fall in love. Jeanne is cut from the same cloth as Mesrine and the pair begin to commit robberies together. After stealing from a mob operated casino, the pair attract the attention of local mob bosses. In 1968, while walking with his young daughter, several men pull a 'drive-by' on Mesrine, wounding him. Guido treats him for his injuries, and suggests that he should leave the country until the things cool down, to which Mesrine agrees. He packs, leaves his kids in custody of his parents, and departs from France, traveling to Canada with Jeanne.

Later, in Montreal, he works as a construction worker on the Champlain Bridge, where he meets a Quebec resident, Jean-Paul Mercier, and they become friends. Mesrine is denied residency in Canada due to his criminal past but he remains there illegally. He and Jeanne hatch a plan to kidnap and hold a French-Canadian billionaire, a decrepit man paralyzed from the waist down. They gain access to his home by taking the jobs of a maid and a chauffeur. After several months, they put their plan into practice, kidnapping the man and spiriting him away to a flat in the city. While Jeanne and Mesrine are away to try and collect the ransom money, the man manages to crawl to the balcony, break the glass, and call for help. The billionaire is taken away by paramedics just as Mesrine and Jeanne arrive back at their apartment. They flee, escaping across the border to the United States. They are subsequently captured in the Arizona desert, while at about the same time, Guido and Paul are murdered back in France by an unknown assailant.

Mesrine and Jeanne are sent back to Canada, where Jeanne is sentenced to five years, and Mesrine is sentenced to 10 years. He is sent to the Saint-Vincent-de-Paul prison, where he is exposed to extreme torture and pain. Nevertheless, he still plans to break out of prison. After reuniting with Jean-Paul, also held in the same prison, he meets Roger André, another prisoner, who helps him and Jean-Paul escape through the fence on a Monday, when the guards in the watch towers are hung over from the weekend. Soon after, they arrive near the border, where Jean-Paul meets Sylvie Jeanjacqout, and he falls in love with her. They hatch a plan to break Roger and friends out of prison, which does not go as intended. While Mesrine and Mercier are mounting the assault on the prison, they are both wounded. Roger is shot and killed.

Later Mesrine manages to call Jeanne, to tell her he plans to break her out of prison, but, fearful for them both and wanting to abandon her old life of crime, with the prison weakening her, she severs her ties to him. Mesrine and Jean-Paul continue on with the robberies, and while having target practice in the woods one day, they are caught by two forest rangers, and forced to kill them and leave them. Mesrine says to Jean-Paul, "If they catch us now, we'll hang."

The end credits roll. Notation concludes that Jeanne was released after serving her sentence, and went back to France to live freely, while Jean-Paul split with Mesrine and was shot dead a year later while robbing a bank. Mesrine's story is 'to be continued' (in part two).

=== Part 2 ===
The second film is about Mesrine's life from 1972 until 2 November 1979, the day of his death. The story starts back in 1972, with Mesrine returning to France after departing from Canada. He is now with Sylvie, who becomes his new girlfriend. He returns to Paris and commits more robberies. However, in March 1973, he is arrested after a successful heist, but as he is transferred to the courtroom, he requests to use the bathroom, and retrieves a pistol hidden in the toilet tank. He brandishes the gun in the court, forces the guards to uncuff him, and takes a judge hostage temporarily, while his apprentice, Michel, awaits, and the duo escapes. He returns to robberies with Michel, but his reckless behaviour (including robbing two banks at the same time) causes Michel to abandon Mesrine. After two months, French intelligence locates Mesrine's apartment, and Commissioner Broussard negotiates with Mesrine, who surrenders. He is brought to court and sentenced to 20 years in La Santé Prison.

During his time in prison, he reunites with his daughter, after 12 years of absence, and she is also present when he pleads his case in court. He then writes a book about his life, which angers his lawyer, who states that his biography places him in a difficult position, since he confesses to everything in public, but he rebuffs it. He also meets François Besse, another convict and his solitary confinement neighbour, and hatches an escape plan; Besse smuggles pepper spray through a cookie box in prison (which can pass through the detectors since it is covered in aluminum foil), while Mesrine meets with his lawyer, who smuggles dual handguns in her briefcase. Mesrine informs the guard to bring his case file from Besse's cell and Besse attacks and subdues the guards with the spray, Mesrine then attacking them as well. They take their uniforms, take another prisoner as a cover and head over the wall, where the prisoner is shot while trying to escape with them. They manage to get away.

After several other robberies, Mesrine fools the media, calling himself "a revolutionary", and professing to bring Palestinian armed forces to slay the French government. This angers Besse, and he leaves him. A year later, in 1979, Mesrine is living a wealthy life and buys himself a 1974 BMW 528i, and contacts his old friend from prison, Charlie Bauer, and they also start a series of robberies. Mesrine becomes more and more dillusioned with the media, secretly meeting with reporters and giving controversial interviews. He also kidnaps a local billionaire, Henri Lelièvre, and holds him for ransom, and then sets him free after being paid. Sylvie is more and more worried about Mesrine, and convinces him to leave the country. Meanwhile, Mesrine kidnaps Jacques Tillier (whose name is changed to Dallier in the movie), who wrote an article about him that he doesn't like, and makes him strip naked, then beats him and shoots him, presuming him dead. Mesrine finds out the next day that Tillier survived the ordeal.

On 2 November 1979, Mesrine and Sylvie leave their apartment disguised, with Sylvie taking her poodle, but Broussard's men are after them. After checking the area, Mesrine and Sylvie arrive at their car and drive off. Broussard is stuck in traffic and runs after them. At an intersection, a truck blocks Mesrine's way, and the back tarp is thrown open, revealing armed police gunmen, who immediately open fire and shoot him dead. Broussard arrives, and orders a hysterical and injured Sylvie and her dog to be taken away, and grimly looks at Mesrine's dead body.

== Cast ==
=== Part 1 and 2 ===
- Vincent Cassel as Jacques Mesrine
- Ludivine Sagnier as Sylvie Jeanjacquot
- Michel Duchaussoy as Pierre André Mesrine (Mesrine's father)
- Myriam Boyer as Mesrine's mother
- Gérard Depardieu as Guido

=== Part 1 ===
- Cécile De France as Jeanne Schneider
- Gilles Lellouche as Paul
- Roy Dupuis as Jean-Paul Mercier
- Elena Anaya as Sofia (Maria De La Soledad)
- Florence Thomassin as Sarah
- Abdelhafid Metalsi as Ahmed
- Pascal Elso as Commissioner SRPJ
- Deano Clavet as Roger André
- Gilbert Sicotte as the billionaire

=== Part 2 ===
- Mathieu Amalric as François Besse
- Gérard Lanvin as Charlie Bauer
- Samuel Le Bihan as Michel Ardouin
- Olivier Gourmet as Commissioner Broussard
- Anne Consigny as Mesrine's advocate
- Georges Wilson as Henri Lelièvre
- Fanny Sidney as Sabrina
- Joseph Malerba as Robert

== Awards and nominations ==
=== Part 1 and 2 ===
- César Awards (France)
  - Won: Best Actor – Leading Role (Vincent Cassel)
  - Won: Best Director (Jean-François Richet)
  - Won: Best Sound (Hervé Buirette, François Groult, Gérard Hardy, Jean Minondo, Loïc Prian and Alexandre Widmer)
  - Nominated: Best Cinematography (Robert Gantz)
  - Nominated: Best Costume Design (Virginie Montel)
  - Nominated: Best Editing (Bill Pankow and Hervé Schneid)
  - Nominated: Best Film
  - Nominated: Best Music Written for a Film (Marco Beltrami and Marcus Trumpp)
  - Nominated: Best Production Design (Emile Ghigo)
  - Nominated: Best Adaptation (Abdel Raouf Dafri and Jean-François Richet)
- Tokyo International Film Festival (Japan)
  - Won: Best Actor (Vincent Cassel)

== Reception ==
=== Box Office ===
Mesrine Public Enemy Number One neared 2 million in admissions after four weeks of release.

=== Critical response ===
Mesrine: Part 1 - Death Instinct has an approval rating of 82% on review aggregator website Rotten Tomatoes, based on 72 reviews, and an average rating of 7.3/10. The website's critical consensus states:"It's undeniably uneven, but Vincent Cassel's electrifying performance makes Mesrine: Killer Instinct a gangster biopic worth seeking out". Metacritic assigned the film a weighted average score of 71 out of 100, based on 23 critics, indicating "generally favourable reviews". Mesrine: Part II - Public Enemy 1 has an approval rating of 81% on review aggregator website Rotten Tomatoes, based on 90 reviews, and an average rating of 7.2/10. The website's critical consensus states: "Vincent Cassel is mesmerizing in the lead role. Even if it's less focused than its predecessor, it's more fun" Metacritic assigned the film a weighted average score of 72 out of 100, based on 18 critics, indicating "generally favourable reviews"

In his review for The New York Times, Stephen Holden wrote that Mesrine "makes for continuously riveting, visceral entertainment that evokes a Gallic Scarface without the drugs. ... Mr. Cassel's monumental performance fuses the cobralike menace of the young Robert Mitchum with the whipsaw, shape-shifting (from wiry to bulbous) volatility of classic Robert De Niro, and lightens it with a cat burglar's grace and agility."
