= Paris 36 =

- Film poster
- Directed by: Christophe Barratier
- Written by: Christophe Barratier
- Story by: Christophe Barratier; Julien Rappeneau (Adaptation); Christophe Barratier; Julien Rappeneau; Pierre Philippe (Dialogue)
- Based on: An original idea by Jean-Michel Derenne; Frank Thomas; Reinhardt Wagner
- Produced by: Jacques Perrin; Nicolas Mauvernay
- Starring: Gérard Jugnot; Clovis Cornillac; Kad Merad; Nora Arnezeder
- Cinematography: Tom Stern
- Edited by: Yves Deschamps
- Music by: Reinhardt Wagner
- Production companies: France 3 Cinéma; Constantin Film; Canal+ TPS Star
- Distributed by: Pathé (France)
- Release date: 6 September 2008
- Running time: 120 minutes
- Countries: France; Germany; Czech Republic
- Language: French
- Budget: $31 million
- Box office: $12.9 million

Paris 36 (French: Faubourg 36) is a 2008 French romantic drama film directed by Christophe Barratier. This film is set in 1930s Paris.

The song "Loin de Paname" (lyrics by Frank Thomas, music by Reinhardt Wagner), sung by Nora Arnezeder, was nominated for an Oscar for Best Original Song. The film is a co-production of France, Germany, and the Czech Republic.

== Plot ==
The stage manager of a popular music hall is charged with murder. During his confession, we see the story of the music hall and its entertainers in flashback. When the music hall closes down, a trio of unemployed friends vow to bring the business back from the dead by staging a musical they hope will be a hit. If their gamble pays off, they'll have the money to buy the theater for themselves and the power to control their own destinies.

== Cast ==
- Gérard Jugnot as Pigoil
- Clovis Cornillac as Milou
- Kad Merad as Jacky
- Nora Arnezeder as Douce
- Pierre Richard as Monsieur TSF
- Bernard-Pierre Donnadieu as Galapiat
- Maxence Perrin as Jojo
- François Morel as Célestin
- Élisabeth Vitali as Viviane
- Christophe Kourotchkine as Lebeaupin
- Eric Naggar as Grevoul
- Eric Prat as Commissaire Tortil
- Julien Courbey as Mondain
- Philippe du Janerand as Triquet
- Stéphane Debac as The Social Services Inspector
- Marc Citti as L'inspecteur du Quai des Orfèvres

== Reception ==
Paris 36 received mixed to positive reviews. It holds a 64% approval rating on Rotten Tomatoes based on 83 reviews, with an average score of 5.93/10. The site's consensus states: "Sweet and light, this homage to French vaudeville – and Francophilia in general – is pretty, but its air of nostalgia occasionally borders on the saccharine." On Metacritic, based on 19 critics, the film has a 40/100 rating, indicating "mixed or average" reviews.

== Accolades ==
Award / Film Festival	Category	Recipients and nominees	Result
Academy Awards	Best Original Song	"Loin de Paname" – Reinhardt Wagner and Frank Thomas	Nominated
César Awards	Best Cinematography	Tom Stern	Nominated
César Awards	Best Original Music	Reinhardt Wagner	Nominated
César Awards	Best Production Design	Jean Rabasse	Nominated
César Awards	Best Costume Design	Carine Sarfati	Nominated
César Awards	Best Sound	Daniel Sobrino, Roman Dymny and Vincent Goujon	Nominated
Lumière Awards	Most Promising Actress	Nora Arnezeder	Won
