= The Class (2008 film) =

2008 film directed by Laurent Cantet

- Theatrical release poster
- French: Entre les murs
- Literally: Between the walls
- Directed by: Laurent Cantet
- Screenplay by: Laurent Cantet; François Bégaudeau; Robin Campillo
- Based on: Entre les murs by François Bégaudeau
- Produced by: Simon Arnal; Caroline Benjo; Barbra Letellier; Carole Scotta
- Starring: François Bégaudeau
- Cinematography: Pierre Milon; Catherine Pujol
- Edited by: Robin Campillo; Stephanie Leger
- Distributed by: Haut et Court
- Release dates: 24 May 2008 (Cannes); 24 September 2008 (France)
- Running time: 128 minutes
- Country: France
- Language: French
- Budget: €2.5 million
- Box office: $29.3 million

The Class (French: Entre les murs, lit. 'Between the walls') is a 2008 French drama film directed by Laurent Cantet, based on the 2006 novel of the same name by François Bégaudeau. The novel is a semi-autobiographical account of Bégaudeau's experiences as a French language and literature teacher in a middle school in the 20th arrondissement of Paris, particularly illuminating his struggles with "problem children": Esmerelda (Esmeralda Ouertani), Khoumba (Rachel Regulier), and Souleymane (Franck Keïta). The film stars Bégaudeau himself in the role of the teacher.

The film received a unanimous Palme d'Or at the 2008 Cannes Film Festival, making it the first French film to do so since 1987, when Maurice Pialat won the award for Under the Sun of Satan. The Class was also nominated for an Academy Award for Best Foreign Language Film, but lost to Departures.

== Plot ==
Set entirely in a secondary school in a working-class district of Paris, where most residents are first-generation immigrants to France born overseas, the film follows the year of a young teacher, François Marin, and the 25 pupils aged 14-15 years whom he takes for an hour each day for French lessons. A loner, he walks the narrow line between maintaining discipline and gaining co-operation.

From the start, wide differences are apparent in the class over standards of dress, deportment, knowledge, and application. A dispute arises over using the imperfect and pluperfect subjunctive, which he admits may be a bit of an affectation and a student questions whether François is gay. When pupils have to read aloud from The Diary of Anne Frank, a girl called Khoumba refuses because she does not consider it relevant to her life. In private, François forces her to apologise.

Success comes when he asks the pupils to write a self-portrait. An assertive girl called Esmeralda reveals that she would like to be a policewoman or failing that, a rapper. A difficult boy called Souleymane, weak in written French, submits his story in an interesting series of photographs (at a parents' evening, his mother cannot speak French at all). However, after an argument over football teams with Will, another boy who is problematic, Souleymane insults François and is sent to the head teacher's office.

At a teachers' conference to decide final placings, François defends Souleymane but his efforts are undermined by the two student representatives at the meeting, Esmeralda and Louise, who behave in a childish manner. During the next class, despite the confidential nature of the teachers' conference, the two girls tell the others that François had it in for Souleymane. A furious François rebukes the pair, saying they behaved like "skanks" (French: pétasses). Uproar follows, in which Souleymane, after accidentally hitting Khoumba with his backpack, storms out and is suspended. Later, Khoumba pulls aside François, telling him that if Souleymane is expelled, his father may send him back to his native country, Mali, as punishment. After a disciplinary hearing at which Souleymane is supported by his mother, for whom he has to translate, he is expelled.

In the last lesson of the year, François asks each pupil what they have learned over the year. Carl has been inspired by science experiments in his chemistry class, Khoumba has warmed to music and enjoyed learning Spanish, Esmerelda professes to have learned nothing in school but then admits that she has read Plato's Republic in her free time. After they have all left the room, a quiet girl called Henriette comes back and claims that she really has not learned anything at all. Outside, an impromptu football match has begun between the pupils and teachers.

== Cast ==
- François Bégaudeau : François Marin, the French language teacher.
- Jean-Michel Simonet : the school principal.
- Burak Ozyilmaz : Burak, top boy of the class.
- Boubacar Touré : Boubacar, who asks Marin if he is gay.
- Carl Nanor : Carl, who has been expelled from his previous school.
- Louise Grinberg : Louise, top girl of the class and a student delegate.
- Esmeralda Ouertani : Esmeralda, vocal student delegate.
- Franck Keïta : Souleymane, who experiences constant discipline.
- Henriette Kasaruhanda : Henriette, the silent girl who says she has learned nothing.
- Rachel Régulier : Khoumba, the girl who refuses to read and writes a letter to Mr. Marin about respect.

== Reception ==
=== Critical response ===
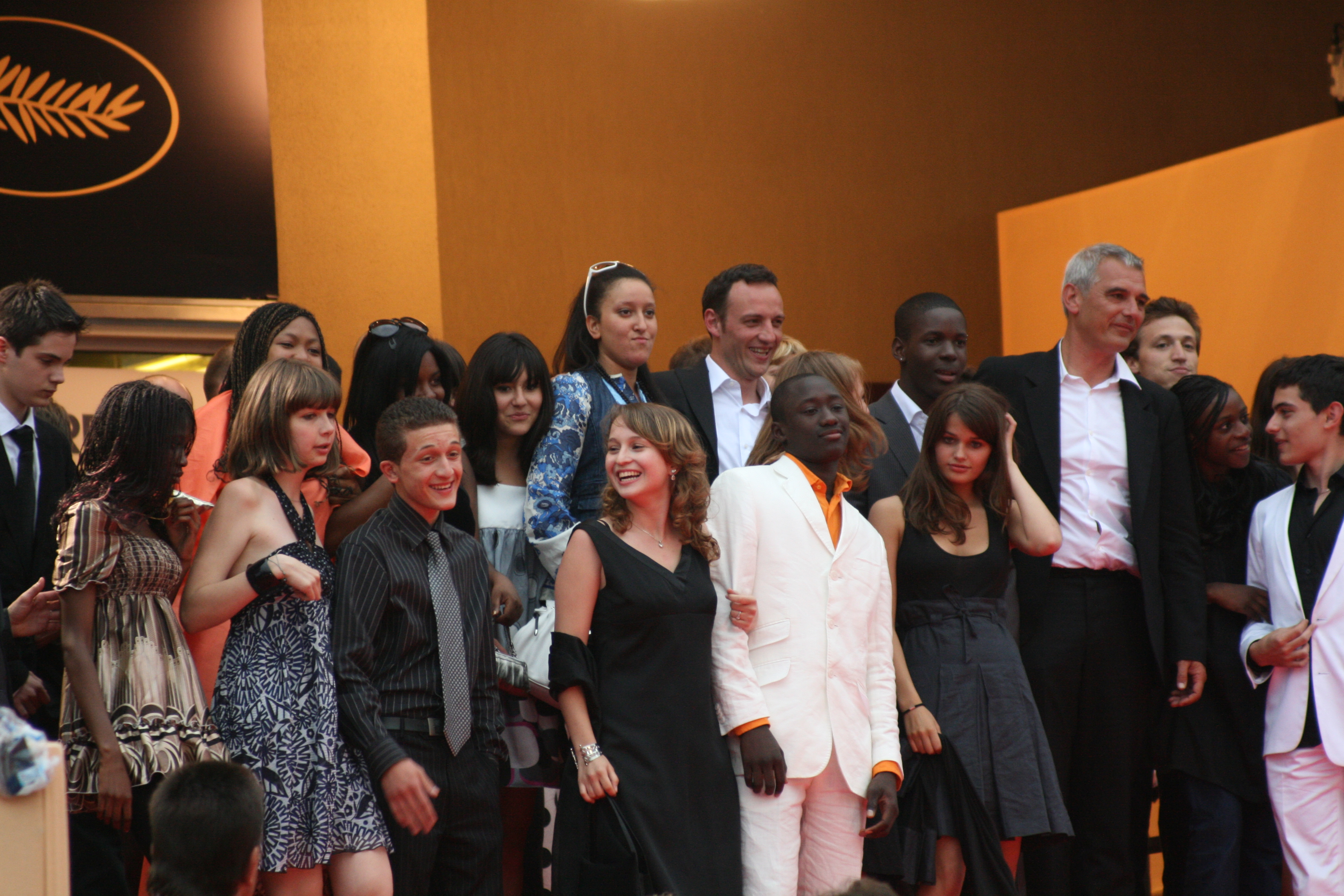
The cast at Cannes Film Festival 2008

The film was the featured opening night selection at the 46th New York Film Festival in 2008.

The film has received critical acclaim, achieving a 95% rating at Rotten Tomatoes out of 161 reviews counted, and an average rating of 8.1/10. The site's consensus reads, "Energetic and bright, this hybrid of documentary style and dramatic plotting looks at the present and future of France through the interactions of a teacher and his students in an inner-city high school." Metacritic lists Entre les murs with a rating of 92, based on 31 critics, making it one of the best reviewed films of the year according to the website.

The film was warmly reviewed by the critic Philip French who noted: "There is a remarkable French tradition of school films, extending from Jean Vigo's Zéro de Conduite, to Nicolas Philibert's Être et avoir. Laurent Cantet, whose parents were both teachers, carries it on and he elicits marvellous performances... As the teacher at a tough, racially mixed, inner-city school in Paris, Marin (François Bégaudeau), neither weary cynic nor wide-eyed idealist, is a decent, determined realist... not a saint, though by the end of the school year he has exhibited some of the necessary qualities."

The film appeared on many critics' top ten lists of the best films of 2008.

French researcher and education writer Philippe Meirieu observed that the film shows a teacher full of leftist good intentions, who nonetheless neglects any form of mediation and who does not use any pedagogy beyond a kind of dialogical lecture, without any structured learning situation. The teacher comes to rely on charm, pressure and sanction, while failing to avoid personal confrontation with some of his students. Meirieu is concerned about the reading that can be made of the film, which, by showing classroom difficulties and the explosive situation that emerges, risks suggesting that there is no alternative to an authoritarian approach.

In 2024, Looper ranked it number 14 on its list of the "50 Best PG-13 Movies of All Time," writing "What could have been one-note schmaltz ended up being one of the best-reviewed foreign-language titles of 2008, thanks to the film's dedication to rendering its lead character as a complicated and flawed human while also delivering optimally-conceived feel-good moments."

== Accolades ==
Award	Date of ceremony	Category	Recipient(s)	Result	Ref(s)
Academy Awards	22 February 2009	Best Foreign Language Film	Laurent Cantet	Nominated	
Cannes Film Festival	14 – 25 May 2008	Palme d'Or	Laurent Cantet	Won	
César Awards	27 February 2009	Best Film	Carole Scotta, Caroline Benjo, Laurent Cantet	Nominated	
César Awards	27 February 2009	Best Director	Laurent Cantet	Nominated	
César Awards	27 February 2009	Best Adaptation	François Bégaudeau, Robin Campillo and Laurent Cantet	Won	
César Awards	27 February 2009	Best Editing	Robin Campillo, Stephanie Leger	Nominated	
César Awards	27 February 2009	Best Sound	Olivier Mauvezin, Agnes Ravez, Jean-Pierre Laforce	Nominated	
European Film Awards	27 February 2009	Best Film	Simon Arnal, Carole Scotta, Barbara Letellier, Caroline Benjo	Nominated	
European Film Awards	27 February 2009	Best Director	Laurent Cantet	Nominated	
Image Awards	12 February 2009	Best Foreign Language Film	Laurent Cantet	Won	
Independent Spirit Awards	21 February 2009	Best International Film	Laurent Cantet	Won	
Los Angeles Film Critics Association	9 December 2008	Best Foreign Language Film	Laurent Cantet	Runner-up	
Lumière Awards	19 January 2009	Best Film	Laurent Cantet	Won	
Lumière Awards	19 January 2009	Public Prize	Laurent Cantet	Won	
Satellite Awards	14 December 2008	Best Foreign Language Film	Laurent Cantet	Nominated	
Toronto Film Critics Association	17 December 2008	Best Foreign Language Film	Laurent Cantet	Runner-up	

== See also ==
- List of submissions to the 81st Academy Awards for Best Foreign Language Film
- List of French submissions for the Academy Award for Best Foreign Language Film
