= I've Loved You So Long =

2008 film by Philippe Claudel

- Film poster
- French: Il y a longtemps que je t'aime
- Directed by: Philippe Claudel
- Written by: Philippe Claudel
- Produced by: Yves Marmion
- Starring: Kristin Scott Thomas
- Cinematography: Jérôme Alméras
- Edited by: Virginie Bruant
- Music by: Jean-Louis Aubert
- Production companies: UGC YM; UGC Images; France 3 Cinéma; Integral Film; Sofica UGC 1; Sofica Soficinéma 4; Canal+; TPS Star
- Distributed by: UGC Distribution (France)
- Release dates: 14 February 2008 (Berlinale); 19 March 2008 (France)
- Running time: 117 minutes
- Countries: France; Germany
- Language: French
- Budget: $2.5 million
- Box office: $23.4 million

I've Loved You So Long (French: Il y a longtemps que je t'aime) is a 2008 drama film written and directed by Philippe Claudel in his directorial debut. It stars Kristin Scott Thomas as a woman who struggles to interact with her family and find her place in society after spending fifteen years in prison. Elsa Zylberstein, Serge Hazanavicius, Laurent Grévill, and Frédéric Pierrot appear in supporting roles.

The film had its world premiere at the 58th Berlin International Film Festival on 14 February 2008, and was theatrically released in France on 19 March 2008, by UGC Distribution. It grossed over $23.4 million worldwide and received positive reviews from critics, who particularly praised Scott Thomas' performance and Claudel's screenplay. At the 62nd British Academy Film Awards, it won Best Film Not in the English Language and was nominated for Best Actress in a Leading Role (for Scott Thomas) and Best Original Screenplay (for Claudel). It garnered six nominations, including Best Film, at the 34th César Awards and won two: Best First Feature Film and Best Supporting Actress (for Zylberstein). The film was also nominated for Best Actress – Drama (for Scott Thomas) and Best Foreign Language Film at the 66th Golden Globe Awards.

== Plot ==
When Juliette Fontaine, formerly a doctor, is released from prison, her younger sister Léa invites her to stay with her family – including her husband, his mute father, and their two adopted Vietnamese daughters – in their home in the university town of Nancy in Lorraine. Why Juliette was in prison is revealed slowly throughout the film: first, that she was in prison for 15 years, then that her crime was murder, then that the victim was her 6-year-old son Pierre, and finally the reason why she killed him.

Léa, a college professor of literature, is considerably younger than Juliette. Because of the nature of Juliette's crime, their parents denied Juliette's existence and refused to allow Léa to visit her. In addition, Juliette had refused to speak throughout her trial. As a result, Léa knows nothing about the circumstances surrounding the crime and, when pressed for details, Juliette refuses to discuss what happened until the end of the film.

While struggling to find employment, Juliette enjoys platonic companionship with two men, a probation officer who understands how prison can damage the human spirit, and Michel, one of Léa's colleagues, who is sympathetic to her ordeal of having been imprisoned.

Gradually, Juliette begins to fit in with Léa and her family, makes friends, and finds a permanent job as a secretary at a hospital. She also develops a close relationship with her young nieces, much to the distress of their father, who is concerned about their safety while in their aunt's presence. Slowly, after seeing how she interacts with the family, he begins to accept her.

Juliette agrees to accompany Léa on a visit to their mother, who is confined to a nursing home with Alzheimer's disease. For a brief moment the woman recognizes and embraces her, remembering her as a little girl rather than the estranged daughter who murdered her grandson.

Léa accidentally discovers a clue to why Juliette killed Pierre. Juliette diagnosed her son as suffering from a fatal and painful disease. Léa confronts Juliette with what she learned, and Juliette explains that, when Pierre's condition progressed so that he could barely move, Juliette killed him with an injection, knowing that otherwise he would suffer unbearable pain. At the trial she spoke no word of defense or explanation, feeling that she deserved punishment for bringing her son into the world, condemned to die. After a cathartic, emotional scene between the two sisters, Léa looks at a window and comments on how beautiful the rain is. Juliette agrees, and the film ends with Juliette saying, "I am here."

== Cast ==
- Kristin Scott Thomas as Juliette Fontaine
- Elsa Zylberstein as Léa
- Serge Hazanavicius as Luc
- Laurent Grévill as Michel
- Frédéric Pierrot as Capitaine Fauré
- Lise Ségur as P'tit Lys
- Jean-Claude Arnaud as Papy Paul
- Mouss Zouheyri as Samir
- Souad Mouchrik as Kaïsha
- Catherine Hosmalin as Insertion Advisor
- Claire Johnston as Juliette and Léa's Mother
- Olivier Cruveiller as Gérard
- Lily-Rose as Emélia

== Production ==
Filming took place in Nancy.

== Release ==
=== Theatrical ===
I've Loved You So Long was screened in the main competition section of the 58th Berlin International Film Festival on 14 February 2008. It brought success at the European Film Market for its seller UGC International and was released in France on 19 March 2008.

The film was also screened at the 35th Telluride Film Festival on 29 August, the 33rd Toronto International Film Festival on 10 September, the 28th Cambridge Film Festival on 21 September, the 27th Vancouver International Film Festival on 29 September, and the 44th Chicago International Film Festival on 21 October. It was released in the United States on 24 October 2008, by Sony Pictures Classics.

=== Home media ===
The film was released on DVD in France on 24 September 2008, in the United Kingdom on 9 February 2009, and in Canada on 10 February. Sony issued it on DVD in anamorphic widescreen format in the United States on 3 March. It has an audio track in French with English subtitles and an English audio track with Kristin Scott Thomas dubbing her own dialogue. Bonus features include deleted scenes with optional commentary by Philippe Claudel.

== Reception ==
=== Box office ===
I've Loved You So Long grossed $3,169,305 in the United States and Canada, and $20,287,323 in other territories, for a worldwide total of $23,456,628.

=== Critical response ===
On the review aggregator website Rotten Tomatoes, 88% of 128 critics' reviews are positive, with an average rating of 7.4/10. The website's consensus reads: "I've Loved You So Long is a sublimely acted family drama as well as a noteworthy directorial debut from Phillipe Claudel." Metacritic, which uses a weighted average, assigned the film a score of 79 out of 100, based on 28 critics, indicating "generally favorable" reviews.

==== Tone ====
Critics noted the film's potentially problematic mixture of tones, as it veers between foreboding and sentimentality. A. O. Scott of The New York Times said, "Mr. Claudel's practice of fading slowly to black between scenes, and the spidery tones of Jean-Louis Aubert's score, create an atmosphere of mystery and dread that is both appropriate to the story and a little misleading. If I've Loved You So Long is not exactly a horror movie, it is nonetheless filled with fear and foreboding. […] This kind of narrative is familiar enough, and so are the risks of sentimental talk-show piety associated with it." He concluded, however, that the film has a "tough-minded resistance to the temptations of melodrama." Scott was not entirely convinced by the film's ending. He wrote, "A revelation comes near the end that is both tremendously moving and a bit disappointing, in the way that the solutions to great mysteries frequently are. This turn does not diminish the accomplishment of Ms. Scott Thomas's deep, subtle and altogether stunning performance, but it does alter the scale of the movie, turning it into a more manageable, less existentially unsettling drama. Which is a relief, I suppose, but also a bit of a letdown."

Derek Elley of Variety called the film "utterly engrossing despite being, on the surface, about very little" and added, "Claudel's script is built out of everyday, unmelodramatic events, succinctly dialogued and not nearly as downbeat as the movie sounds on paper." Kenneth Turan was even more positive, describing the film as "An example of the French tradition of high-quality adult melodrama, conventional in technique but not story, this thoughtful, provocative film is slow developing because it's all about character".

==== Acting and direction ====
Critics praised the acting, especially that of Kristin Scott Thomas. A. O. Scott felt she mitigated the film's tonal problems: "Luckily, Ms. Scott Thomas's furious honesty rules out easy, unearned redemption". Turan wrote, "When you're doing a film like this, you want the best acting you can get, and writer and first-time director Philippe Claudel chose brilliantly when he picked Kristin Scott Thomas to star as the shattered Juliette . . . I've Loved You is not without weaknesses . . . but performances this strong and direction this sensitive make us simply grateful to have an emotional story we can sink our teeth into and enjoy."

Mick LaSalle of the San Francisco Chronicle commented:

Kristin Scott Thomas' performance . . . is one of a small handful of highlights by which people will remember this year in movies. This is acting at its most exalted. This is film being used for its supreme purpose and function, to show us, moment by moment, the grand movements of a soul. If we're lucky, we get one or two gifts like this a year . . . I've Loved You So Long is worth seeing more than once, just to watch how Thomas scores the performance from beginning to end . . . [She] plays Juliette as someone with no energy left for pretense . . . At all times, she has about her an aura of sadness and defensiveness . . . None of this is actually spoken in writer-director Philippe Claudel's screenplay.

Elley too found Scott Thomas to be "aces in the lead role, with flashes of mordant wit that prevent it from becoming a dreary study in self-pity." However, he felt that "Zylberstein, a variable actress who's very dependent on her directors, is good here, but lacks Scott Thomas' quiet heft and can't quite handle Lea's occasional emotional outbursts. Still, the sisters' dramatic final talk works just fine."

The critics also praised Claudel's direction. Scott wrote, "Claudel is gratifyingly absorbed in details of setting and character. And even though the unfathomable horror in Juliette's past dominates everything else, the small felicities and absurdities of real life manage to peek through the gloom." LaSalle praised his work with the actors:

It's the beauty of Claudel's design that he is able to suggest the specific nature of Juliette's conflict through pictures, by setting up moments of tension and then generously showing us the face of his lead actress . . . They say a director has to make three great films before he can be called a great. For his debut film, Claudel can check off the first box. He proves himself as adept at controlling a story as he is at directing actors, and his intuitive leap - casting Thomas - was inspired and transformative. He has made Thomas sexy and volatile and has turned her into an actress whose future movies absolutely must be seen.

=== Top ten lists ===
The film was cited as one of the year's ten best by many critics, including Joe Neumaier of the New York Daily News, Mick LaSalle of the San Francisco Chronicle, Rick Groen of The Globe and Mail, Josh Rosenblatt of The Austin Chronicle, Steve Rea of The Philadelphia Inquirer, Ray Bennett of The Hollywood Reporter, Anthony Lane of The New Yorker, Ann Hornaday of The Washington Post, and David Denby of The New Yorker.

=== Accolades ===
- BAFTA Award for Best Film Not in the English Language (winner)
- BAFTA Award for Best Actress in a Leading Role (Kristin Scott Thomas, nominee)
- BAFTA Award for Best Original Screenplay (nominee)
- British Independent Film Award for Best Foreign Film (nominee)
- Chicago Film Critics Association Award for Best Foreign Language Film (nominee)
- César Award for Best First Feature Film (Philippe Claudel, winner)
- César Award for Best Actress in a Supporting Role (Elsa Zylberstein, winner)
- César Award for Best Film (nominee)
- César Award for Best Actress (Scott Thomas, nominee)
- César Award for Best Original Screenplay (nominee)
- César Award for Best Music Written for a Film (Jean-Louis Aubert, nominee)
- Critic Award of Zygmunt Kałużyński, International Film Festival TOFIFEST 2009 (winner)
- European Film Award for Best European Actress (Scott Thomas, winner)
- Golden Globe Award for Best Foreign Language Film (nominee)
- Golden Globe Award for Best Actress – Motion Picture Drama (Scott Thomas, nominee)
- London Film Critics' Circle Award for Best British Actress of the Year (Scott Thomas, winner)
- Satellite Award for Best Actress – Motion Picture Drama (Scott Thomas, nominee)
- London's Favourite French Film 2009 (winner)

== See also ==
- Juliet of the Spirits — Juliette is compared to the Fellini film (as Juliette des esprits)
