= Abdel Raouf Dafri =

French film and television scriptwriter (born 1964)

- Dafri in 2026
- Born: 13 August 1964 (age 62); Marseille, France

Abdel Raouf Dafri (born 13 August 1964 in Marseille and raised near Lille) is a French film and television scriptwriter. Born in a family of Algerian Arabic descent, he became interested in television and film writing.

His first television series was La Commune, which was aired in 2007 on French television. He has collaborated on films with such directors as Julien Leclerq, Jean-François Richet, and writer/ director Jacques Audiard. With the latter, he co-created Un prophète (A Prophet) (2009), which was nominated for a 2010 Academy Award as Best Foreign Film and received awards in Europe.

== Filmography ==
Television

- Wrote a brief summary of the major points of Commissaire Moulin
- 1995 : Habeas Corpus (court métrage) (Screenplay)
- 2007 : La Commune (Creator) TV Series
- 2011 : Braquo, Season 2
- 2013 : Gibraltar (Dir: Julien Leclerq)

Film

- 2008 : Mesrine : L'Instinct De Mort (Screenwriter, Dialogue Writer) directed by Jean-François Richet
- 2008 : Mesrine : L'Ennemi Public N°1 (Screenplay, Adaptation) directed by Jean-François Richet
- 2009 : Un prophète (Story and Screenplay), directed by Jacques Audiard
- 2010 : L'Aviseur (Screenplay), directed by Julien Leclercq
- Director
- 2020 : 'Qu'un sang impur... (May impure blood)
