= François Bégaudeau =

French writer, journalist, and actor

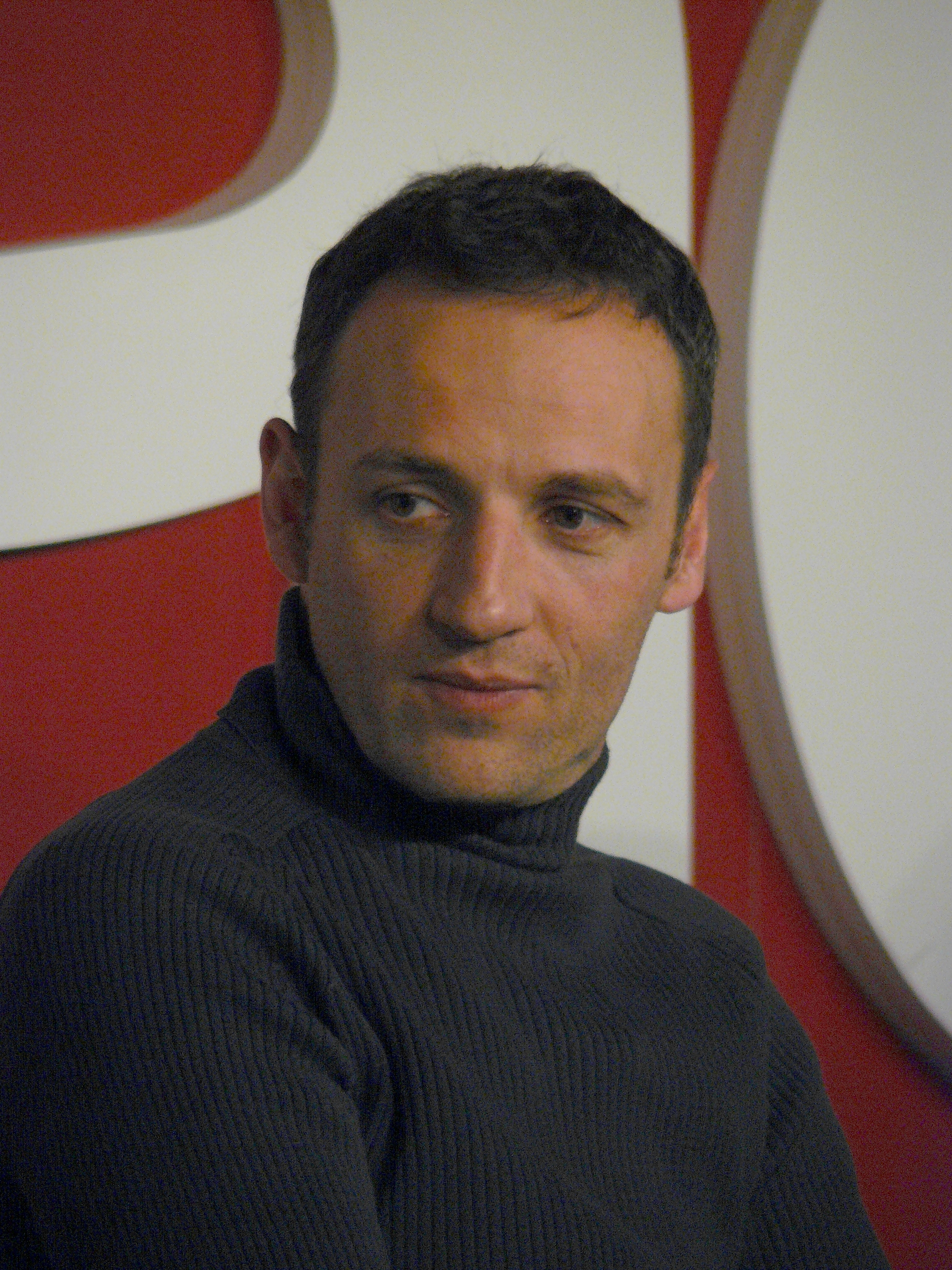
- François Bégaudeau, March 2009
- Born: 27 April 1971 (age 55); Luçon, Vendée, France
- Occupations: Writer, journalist, actor
- Years active: 2003–present

François Bégaudeau (French: [fʁɑ̃swa beɡodo]; born 27 April 1971) is a French novelist and essayist. He is best known for co-writing and starring in The Class (2008), a film based on his 2006 semi-autobiographical novel Entre les murs. The film won the Palme d'Or at the 2008 Cannes Film Festival and received an Academy Award nomination for Best Foreign Language Film in 2009.

== Early life ==
He was born in Luçon, Vendée, France and was a member of the 1990s punk rock group Zabriskie Point. After receiving his degree in Literature, he taught high school in Dreux and in an inner city middle school in Paris.

== Career ==
Bégaudeau published his first novel, Jouer juste in 2003. In 2005, he published Dans la diagonale and Un démocrate, Mick Jagger 1960-1969, a fictionalized account of the life of Mick Jagger. In 2006, his third novel entitled Entre les murs earned him the Prix France Culture/Télérama.

Bégaudeau works as a movie critic for the Cahiers du cinéma. He was also a regular contributor for several French magazines, including Inculte, Transfuge and So Foot. Since 2006, he has been a columnist for La Matinale and Le Cercle on Canal+ television.

He worked on the screenplay for Entre les murs (2008), a film based on his 2006 novel of the same name, in collaboration with the film's director Laurent Cantet. Bégaudeau also starred as the lead in the film, which went on to win the Palme d'Or at the 2008 Cannes Film Festival. The film also earned an Academy Award nomination for Best Foreign Language Film in 2009, though it ultimately lost to Japan's Departures. The English-language version of Entre les murs was published in April 2009 by Seven Stories Press under the title The Class.

== Works ==
- Jouer juste, Éditions Verticales, 2003
- Dans la diagonale, Éditions Verticales, 2005
- Un démocrate : Mick Jagger 1960-1969, Naïve Records, 2005
- Entre les murs, Éditions Verticales, 2006
- Collaboration for Débuter dans l'enseignement : Témoignages d'enseignants, conseils d'experts, ESF, 2006
- Collaboration for Devenirs du roman, Naïve Records, 2007
- Collaboration for Une année en France : Réferendum/banlieues/CPE, Gallimard, 2007
- Fin de l'histoire, Éditions Verticales, 2007
- Vers la Douceur, Éditions Verticales, 2009
- Histoire de ta bêtise, Éditions Fayard/Pauvert, 2019
- Notre Joie, Éditions Fayard/Pauvert, 2021
- L'Amour, Éditions Verticales, 2023
