= Seidi Haarla =

Finnish actress (born 1984)

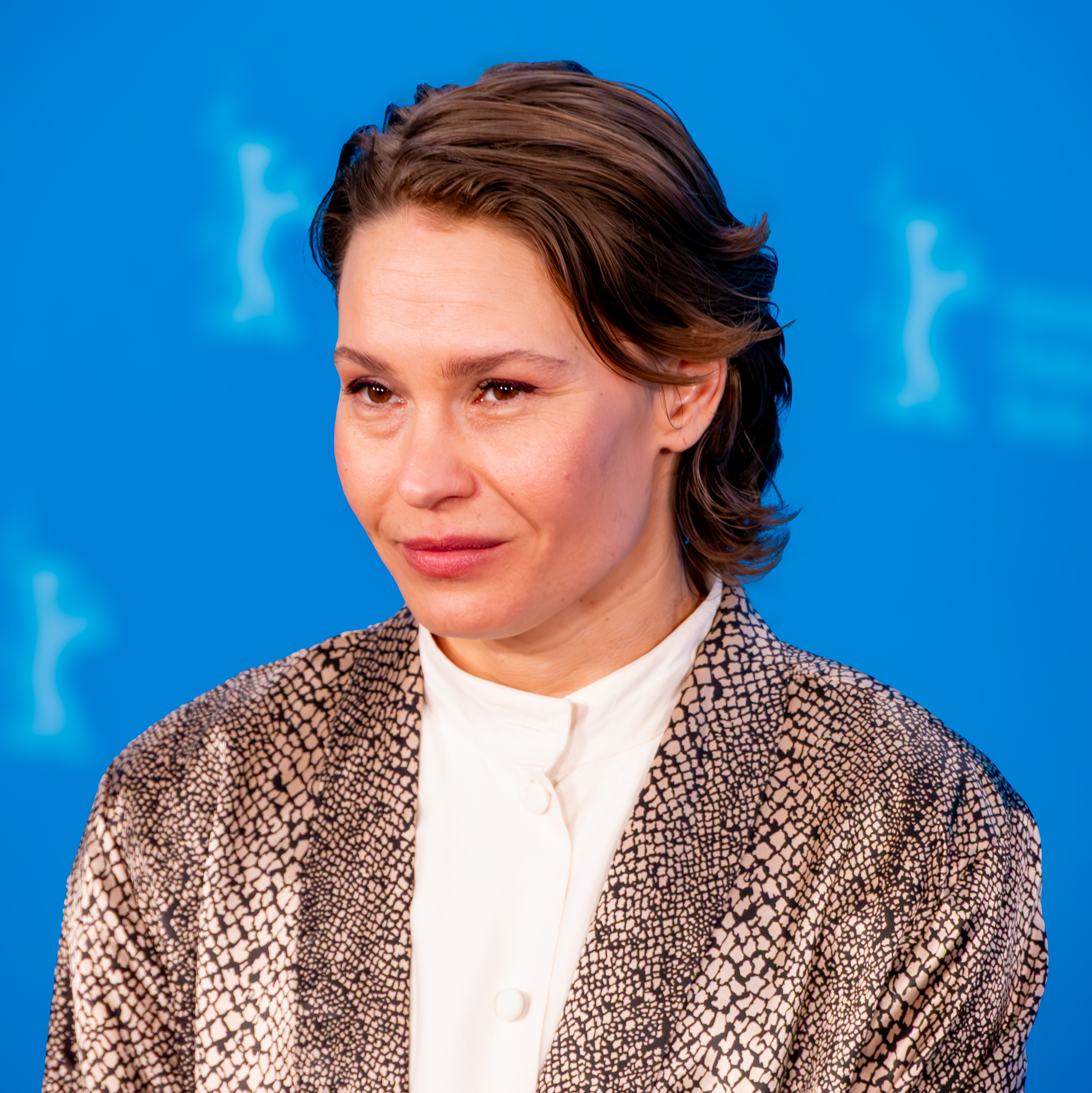
- Haarla in 2026
- Born: 1 January 1984 (age 42); Kirkkonummi, Finland
- Spouse: Married
- Children: 3

Seidi Haarla (born 1 January 1984) is a Finnish actress. She played the female lead in Juho Kuosmanen's film Compartment No. 6 (2021). She won the European Film Promotion (EFP) Shooting Stars Award for her role as one of the most promising film actors of the year.

== Early life ==
Haarla was born in 1984 in Kirkkonummi in southern Finland. She comes from a family of actors and artists. Her father is artist Teuri Haarla (born 1955). Her younger sister Ruusu Haarla (born 1989) is a playwright and director. Her grandparents were actor Saulo Haarla (1930–1971) and soprano and actress Helena Salonius (1930–2012); her great-grandparents include stage actress Tyyne Haarla (1892–1968) and writer Lauri Haarla (1890–1944).

== Career ==
In 2004, Haarla appeared in a student theater group in Helsinki. In 2005, she studied acting at the Russian State Institute of Performing Arts in Saint Petersburg. She graduated from University of the Arts Helsinki in 2015 with a Master of Arts in Theater and Drama.

Together with her sister Ruusu, Haarla wrote the plays The Trauma Body (2014) and New Childhood (2020) which were inspired by her own childhood experiences. She appeared on stage in their productions.

Haarla has appeared in Finnish film and television productions since 2015. In 2021, she took on the female leading role of Laura in Juho Kuosmanen's film drama Compartment No. 6, which is based on Rosa Liksom's novel of the same name. Her performance earned her critical acclaim and an award as one of the European Shooting Stars 2021. Haarla was nominated for Best Actress at the European Film Awards 2021.

== Personal life ==
Haarla is married with three children and lives in Turku.
