= BAFTA Award for Best Film Not in the English Language =

British film industry award

- Awarded for: Excellence in world cinema
- Location: London
- Country: United Kingdom
- Presented by: British Academy of Film and Television Arts
- First award: 1983
- Currently held by: Sentimental Value (2025)
- Website: http://www.bafta.org/

The BAFTA Award for Best Film Not in the English Language is a film award given annually by the British Academy of Film and Television Arts and presented at the British Academy Film Awards. The award was first given at the 36th British Academy Film Awards, recognising the films of 1982, and until 1990 was known as the Best Foreign Language Film. Prior to this, films recorded in a language other than English were often recognised in the category BAFTA Award for Best Film, known between 1949 and 1969 as Best Film from any Source.

In the following lists, the titles and names in bold with a gold background are the winners and recipients respectively; those not in bold are the nominees. The years given are those in which the films under consideration were released, not the year of the ceremony, which always takes place the following year.

== Winners and nominees ==
indicates the winner

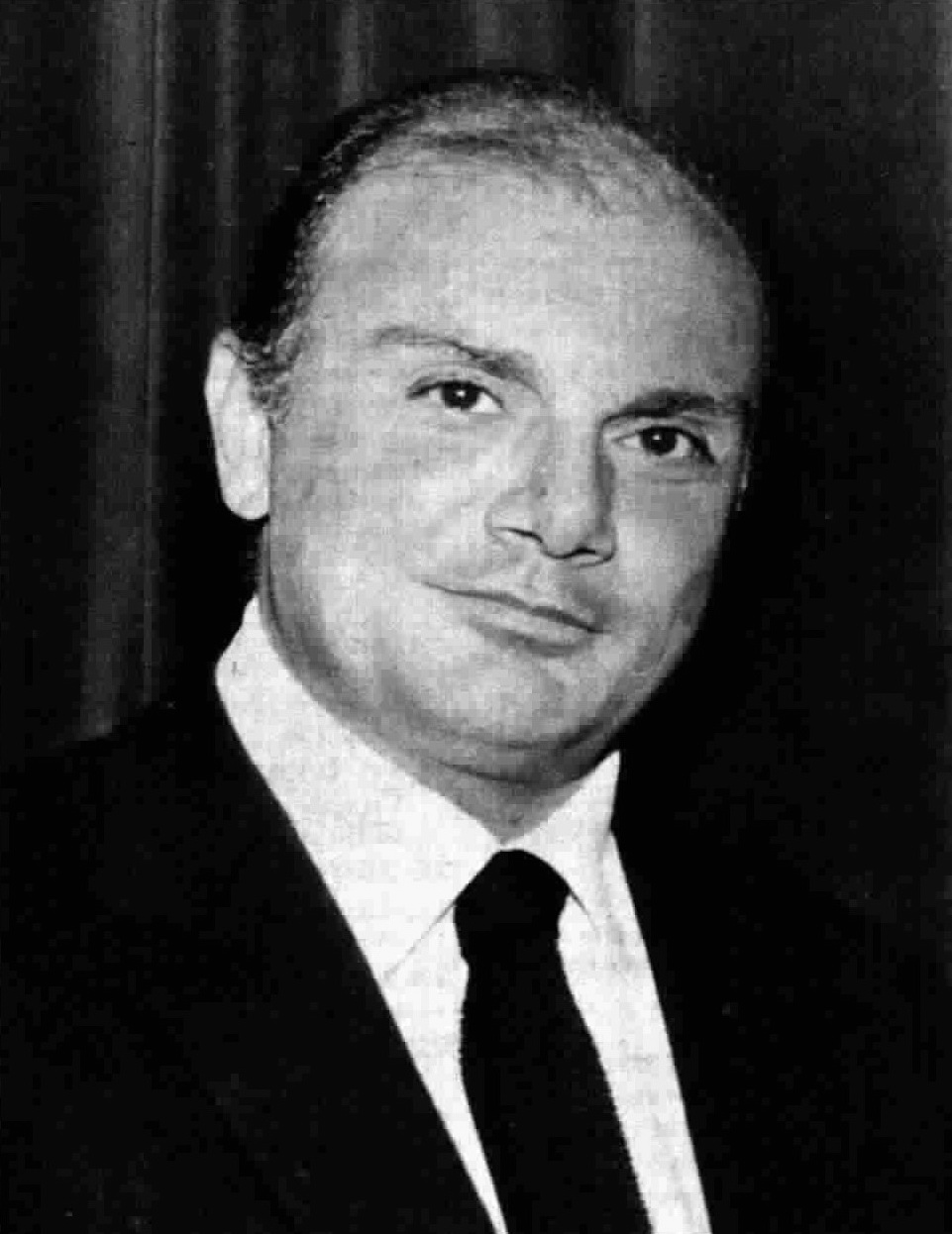
Francesco Rosi was the first winner of this category in 1982 winning for Christ Stopped at Eboli.

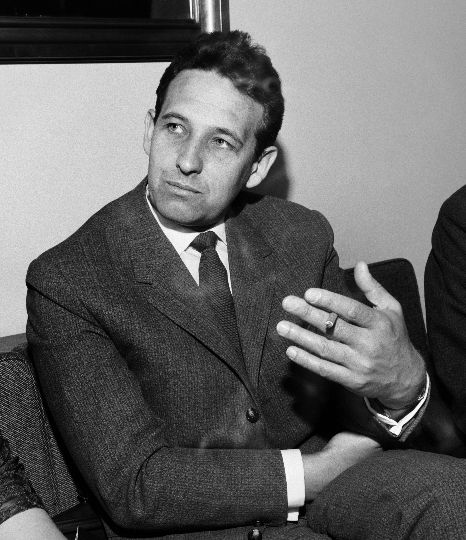
Andrzej Wajda won for Danton (1983)

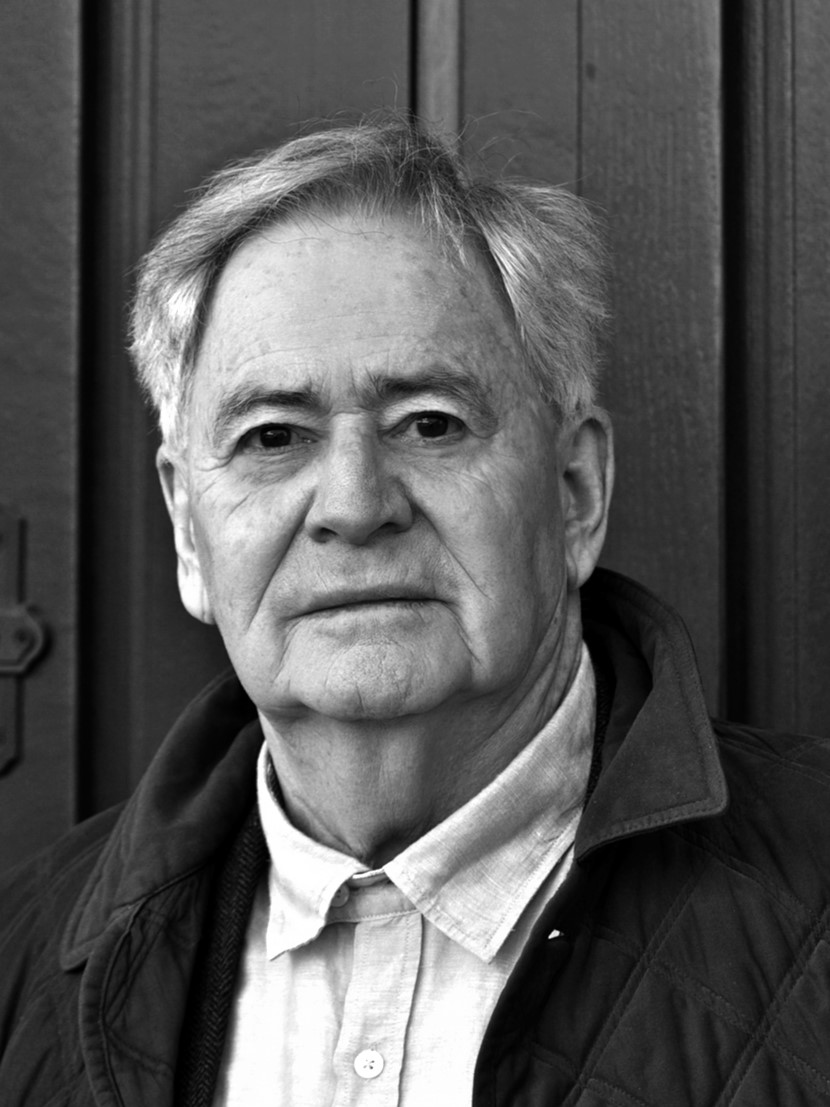
István Szabó won for Colonel Redl (1985)

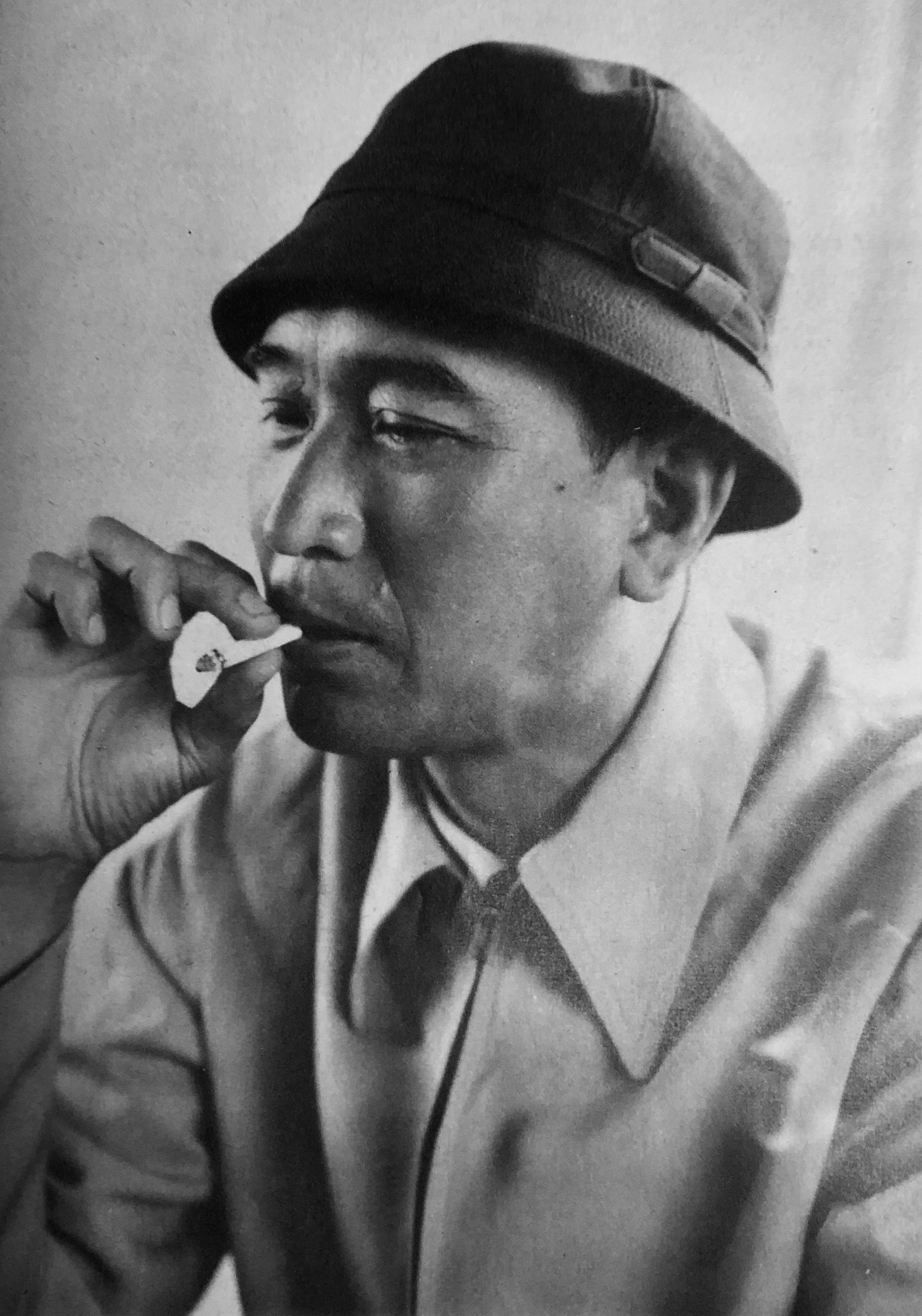
Akira Kurosawa won for Ran (1986)

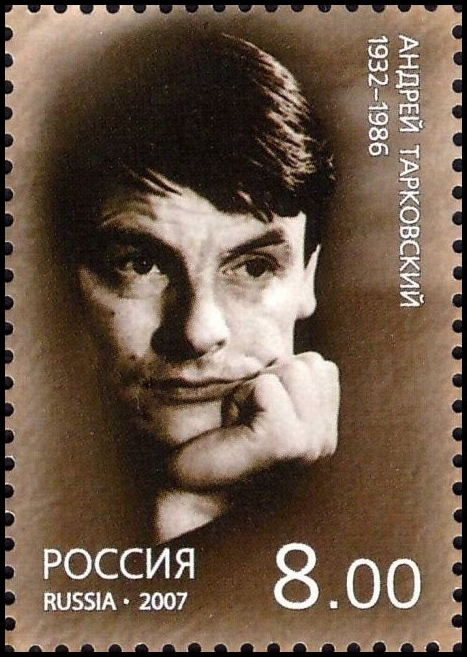
Andrei Tarkovsky won for The Sacrifice (1987)

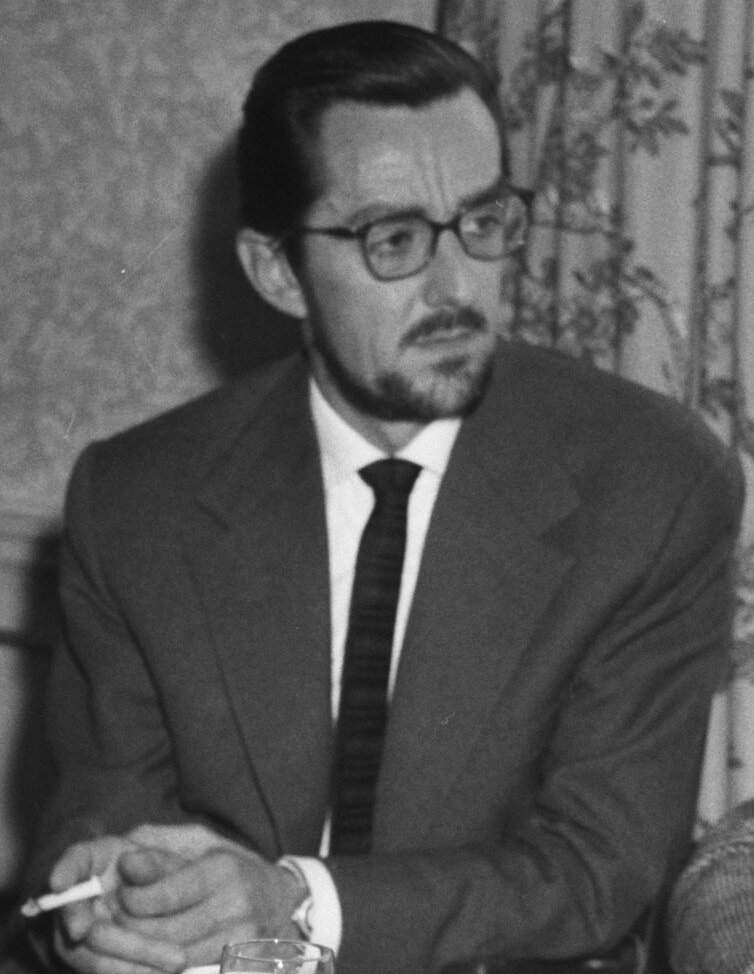
Gabriel Axel won for Babette's Feast (1988)

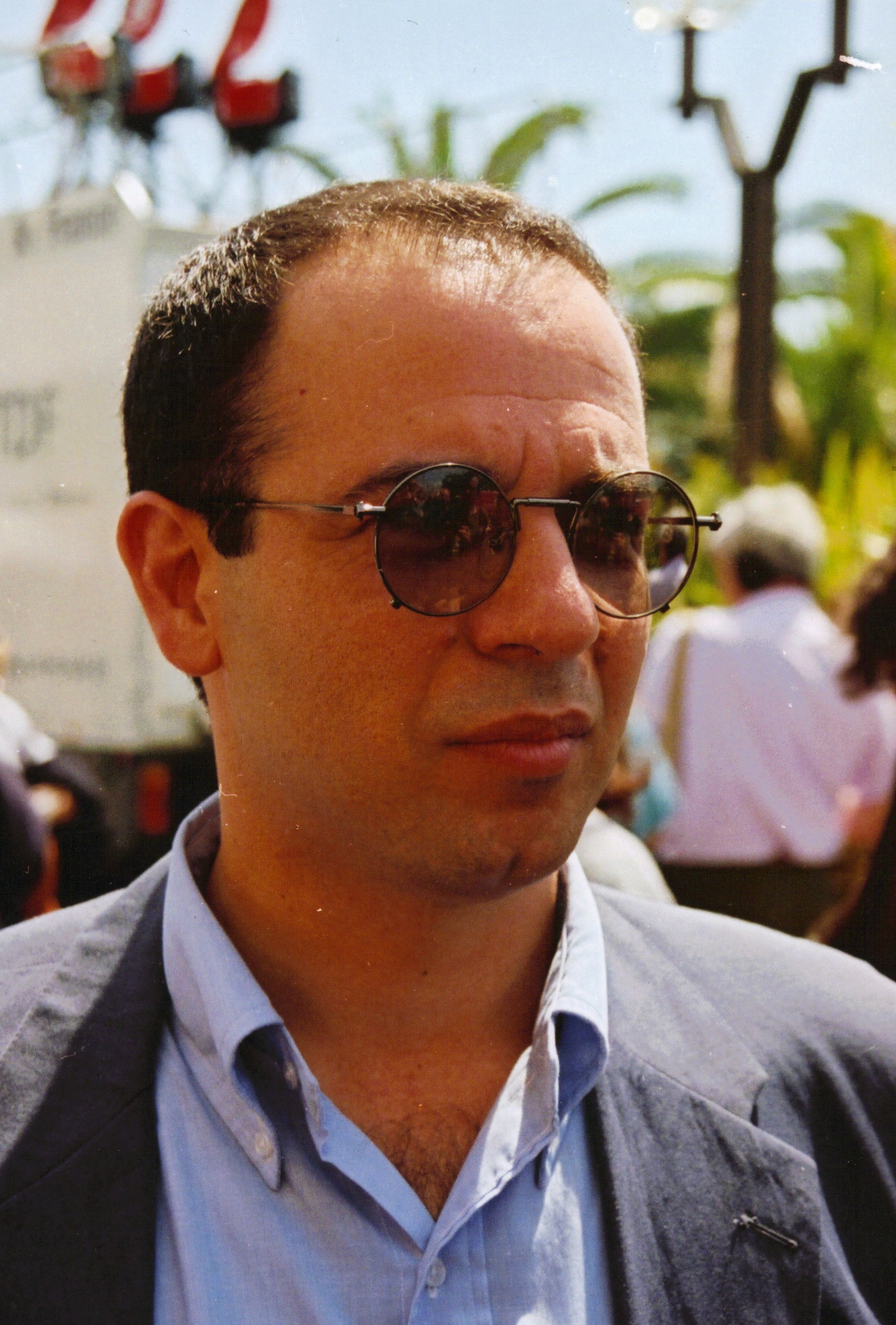
Giuseppe Tornatore won for Cinema Paradiso (1990)

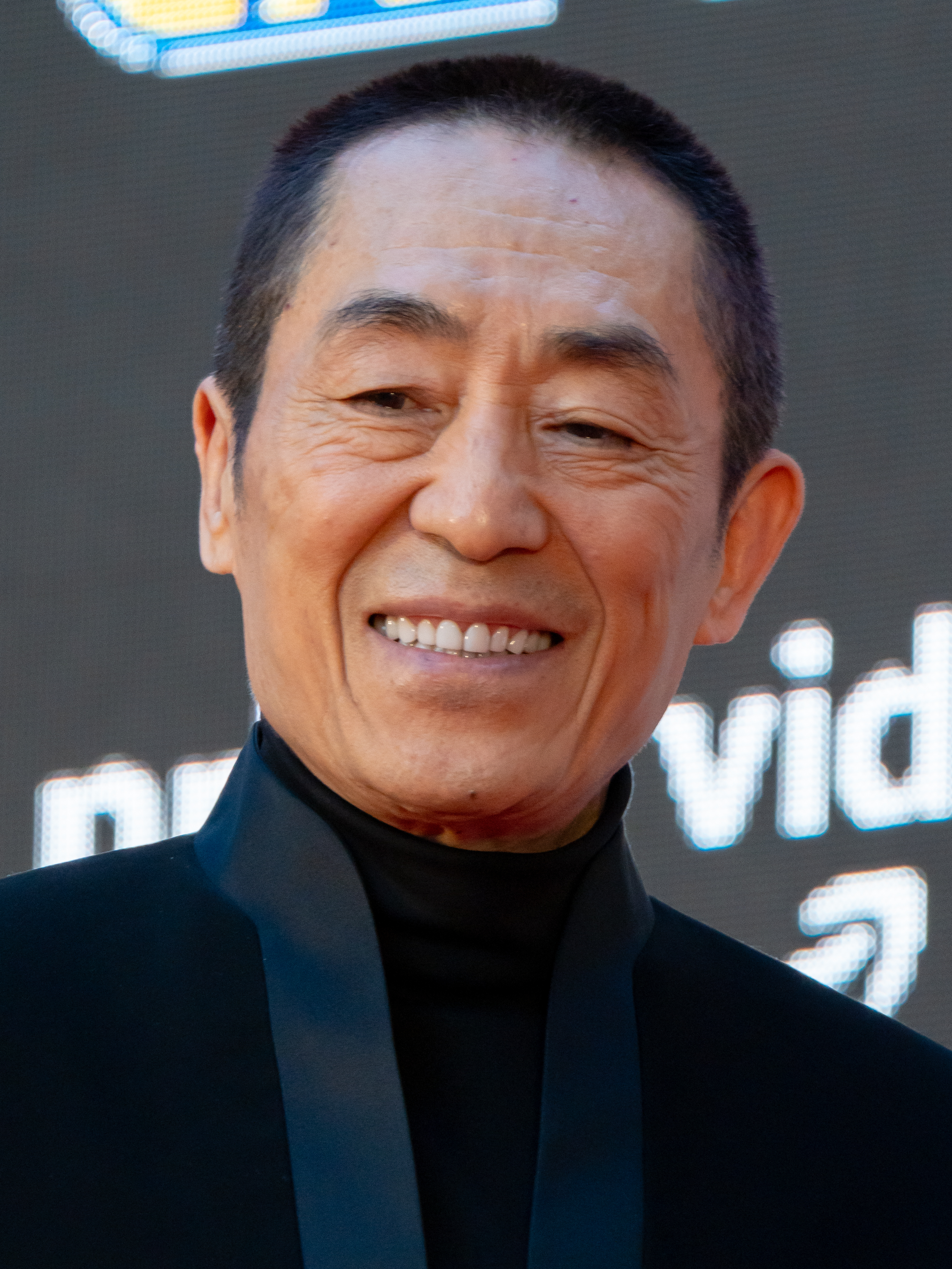
Zhang Yimou won twice for Raise the Red Lantern (1992) and To Live (1994).

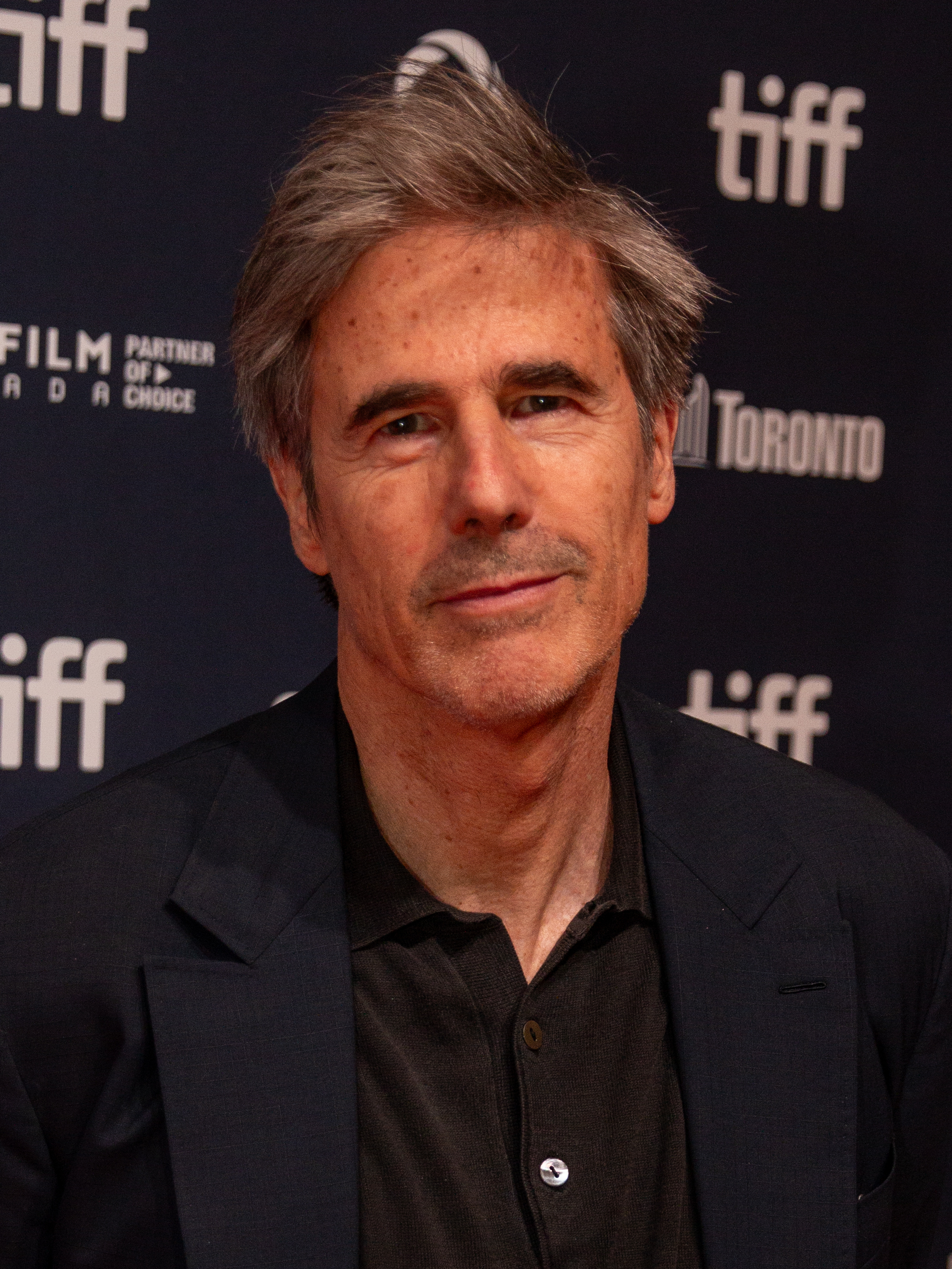
Walter Salles won twice for Central Station (1998) and The Motorcycle Diaries (2004).

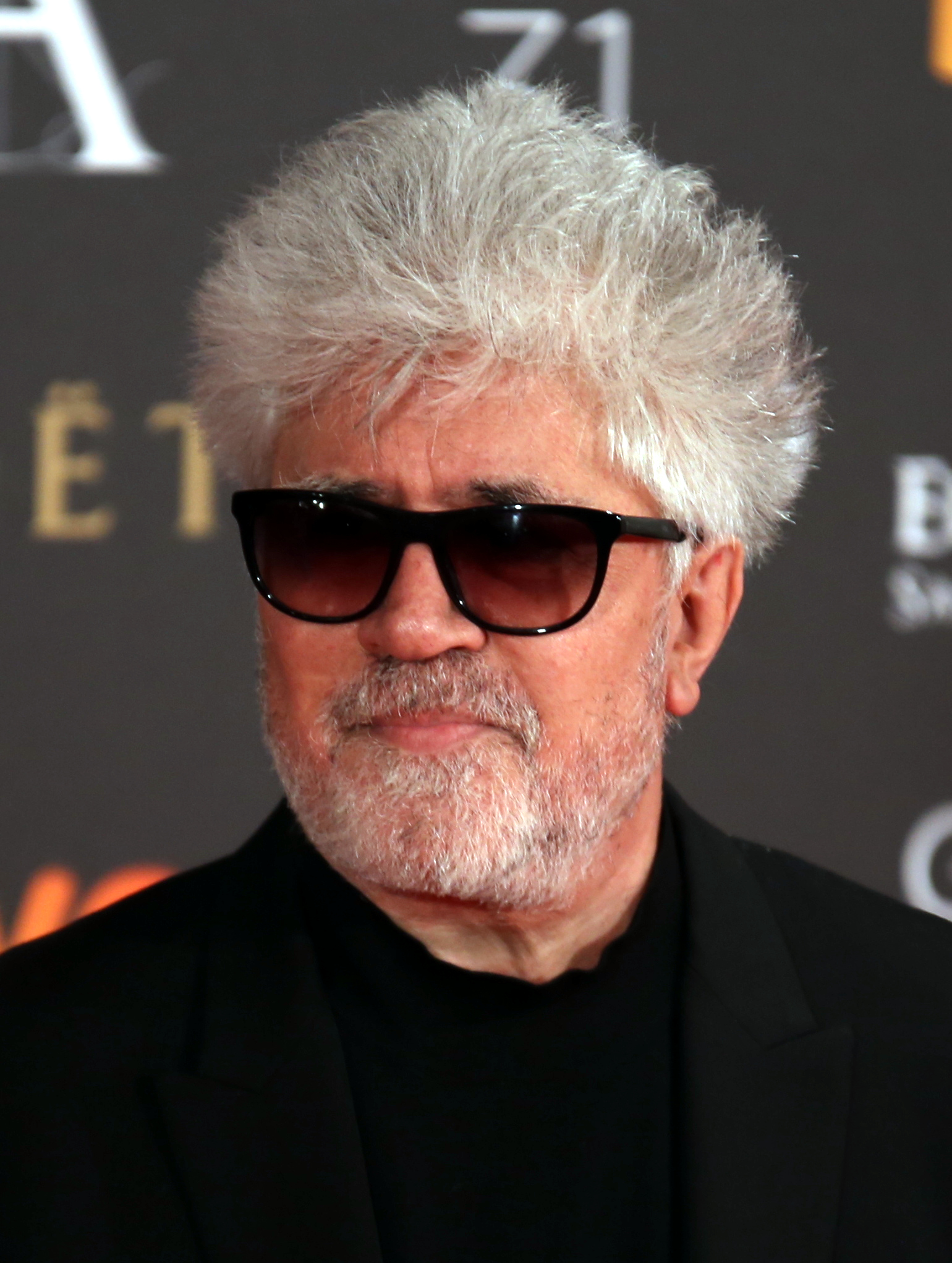
Pedro Almodóvar won thrice for All About My Mother (1999), Talk to Her (2002), and The Skin I Live In (2011).

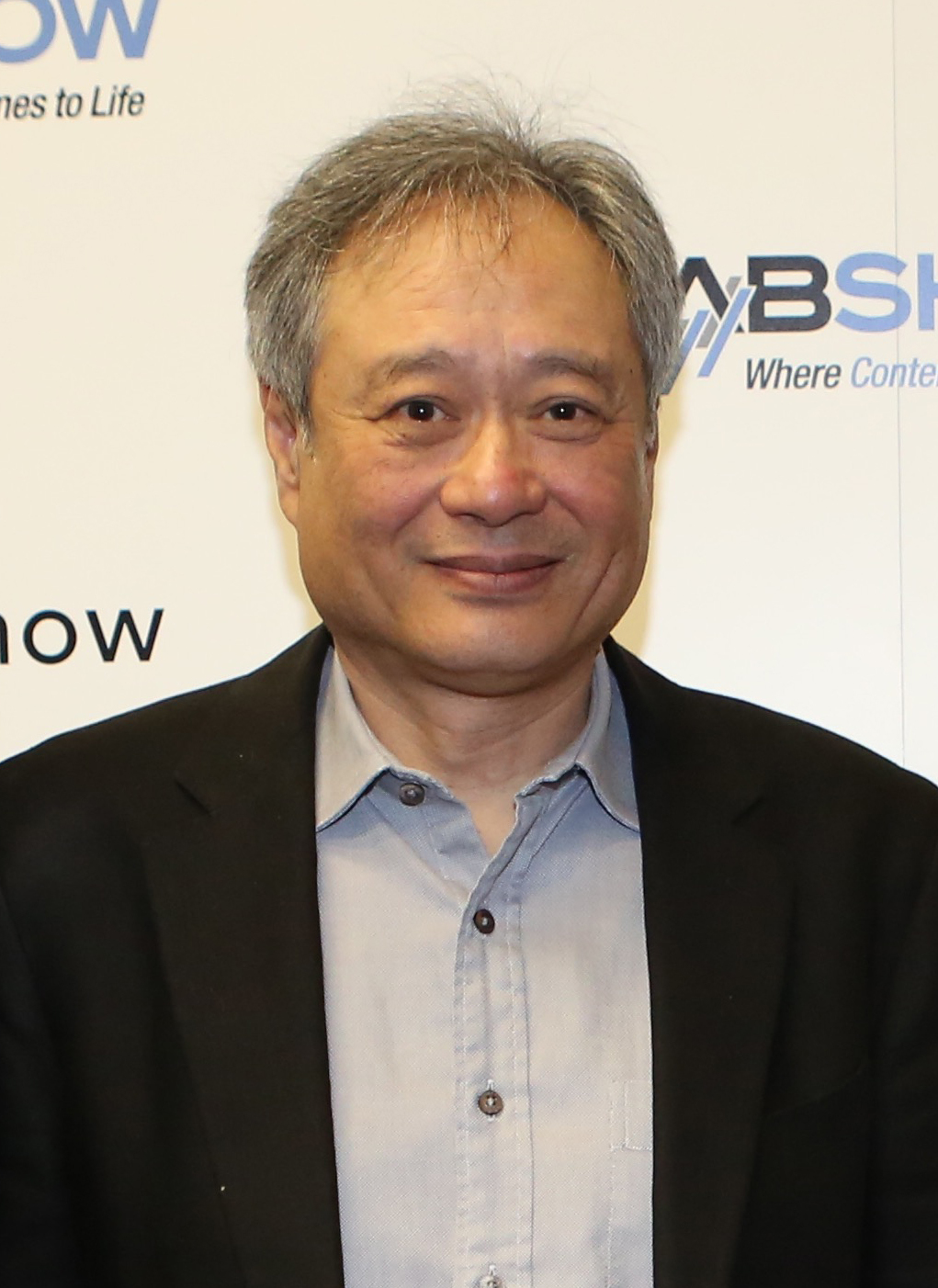
Ang Lee won for Crouching Tiger, Hidden Dragon (2000).

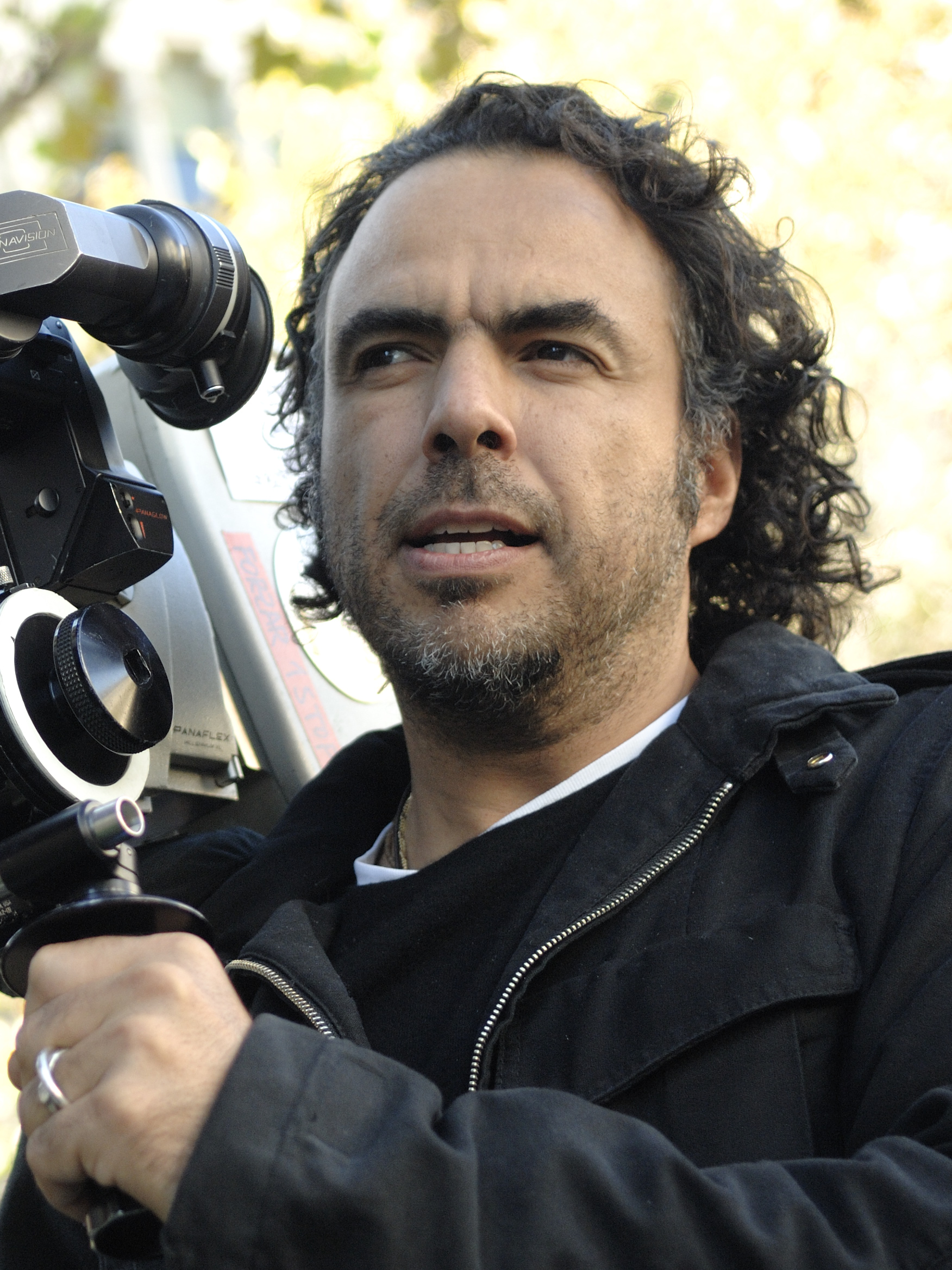
Alejandro González Iñárritu won for Amores perros (2001).

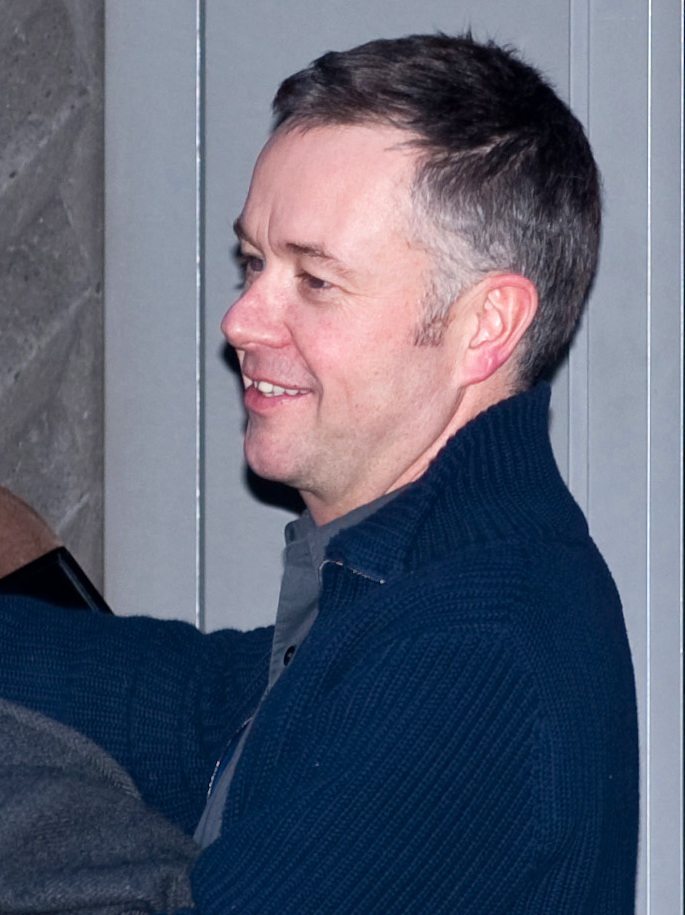
Michael Winterbottom won for In This World (2003).

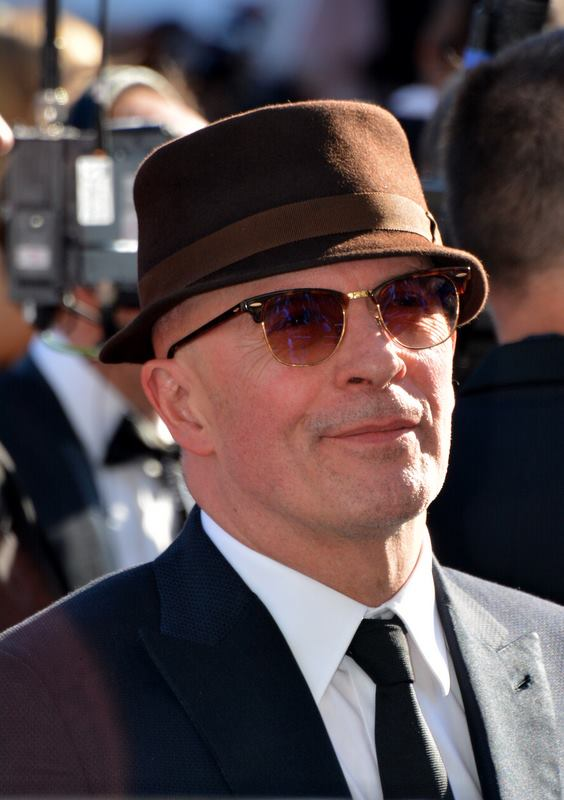
Jacques Audiard won thrice for The Beat That My Heart Skipped (2005), A Prophet (2009), and Emilia Perez (2025).

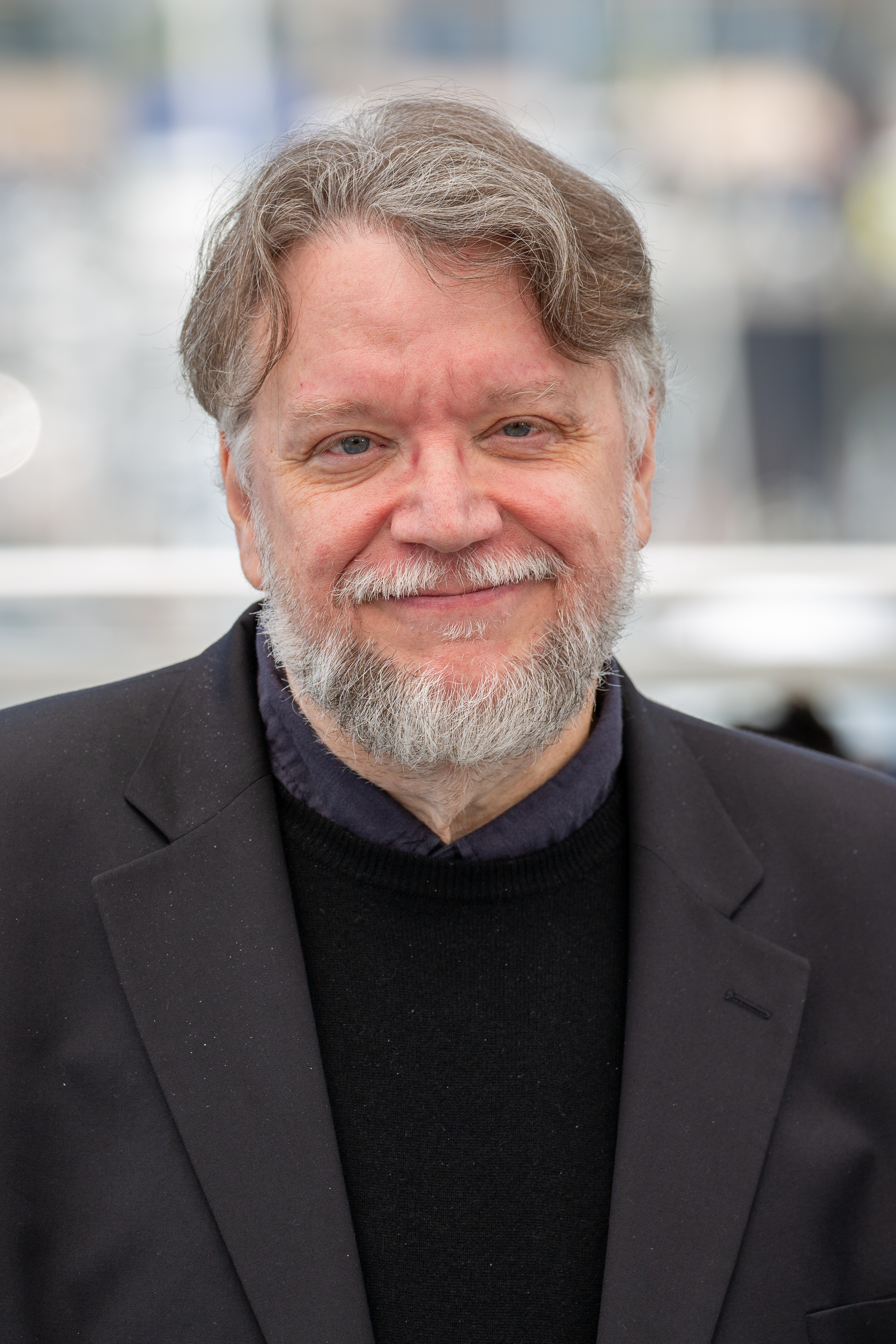
Guillermo del Toro won for Pan's Labyrinth (2006).

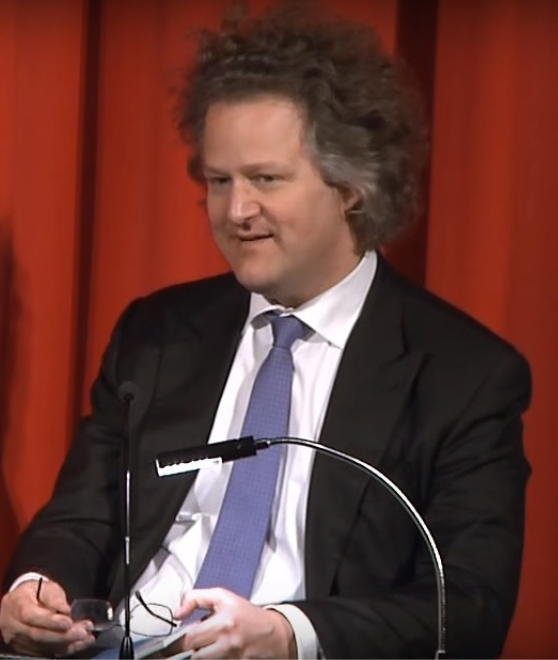
Florian Henckel von Donnersmarck won for The Lives of Others (2007).

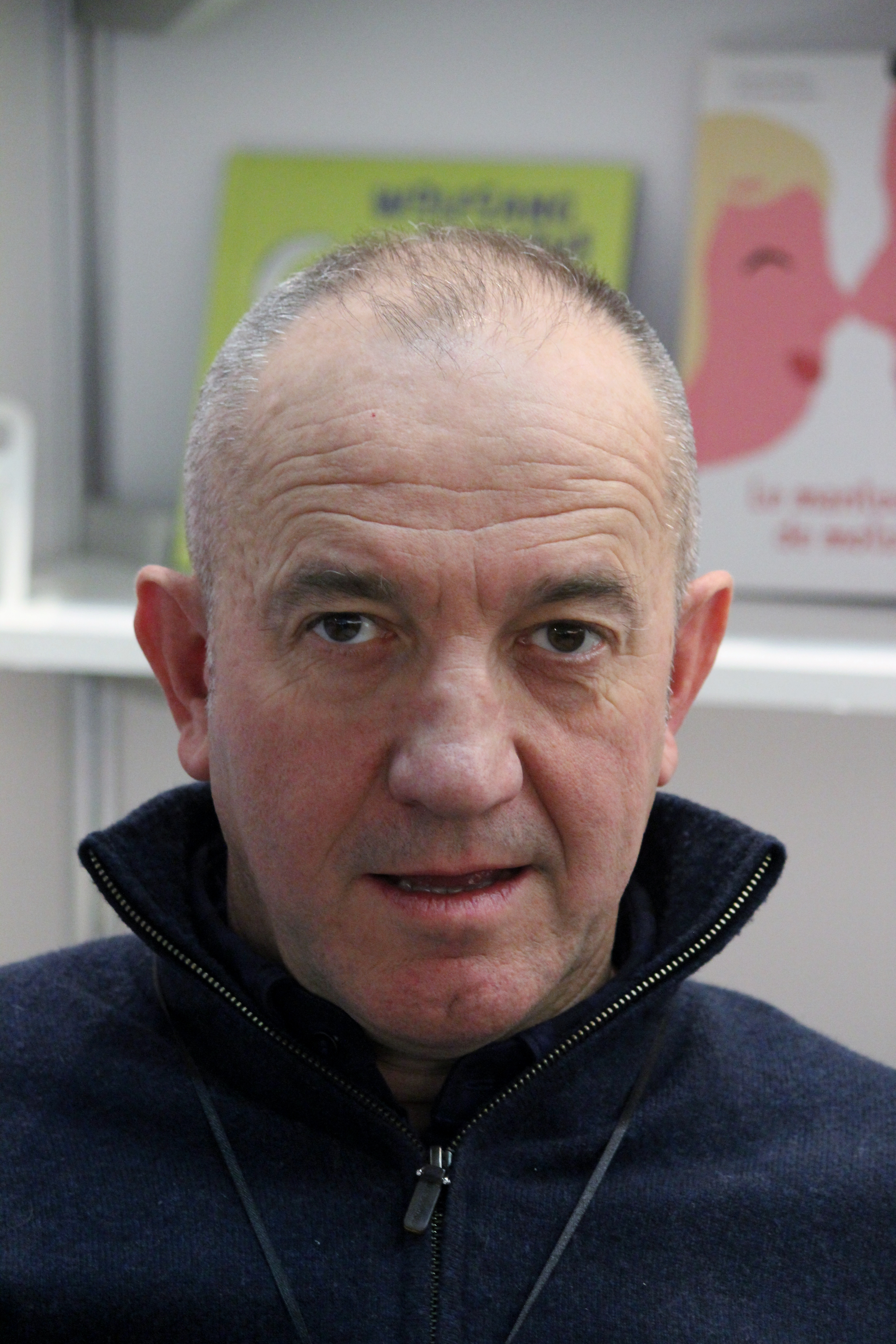
Philippe Claudel won for I've Loved You So Long (2008).

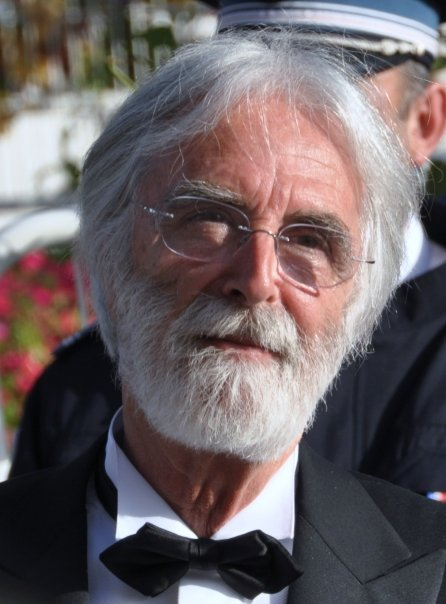
Michael Haneke won for Amour (2012).

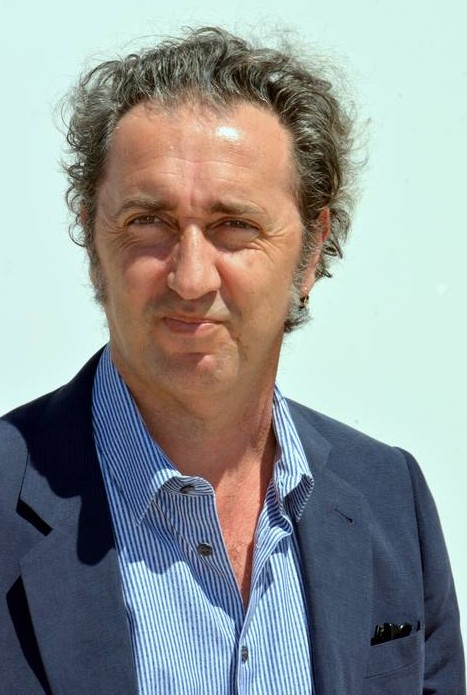
Paolo Sorrentino won for The Great Beauty (2013).

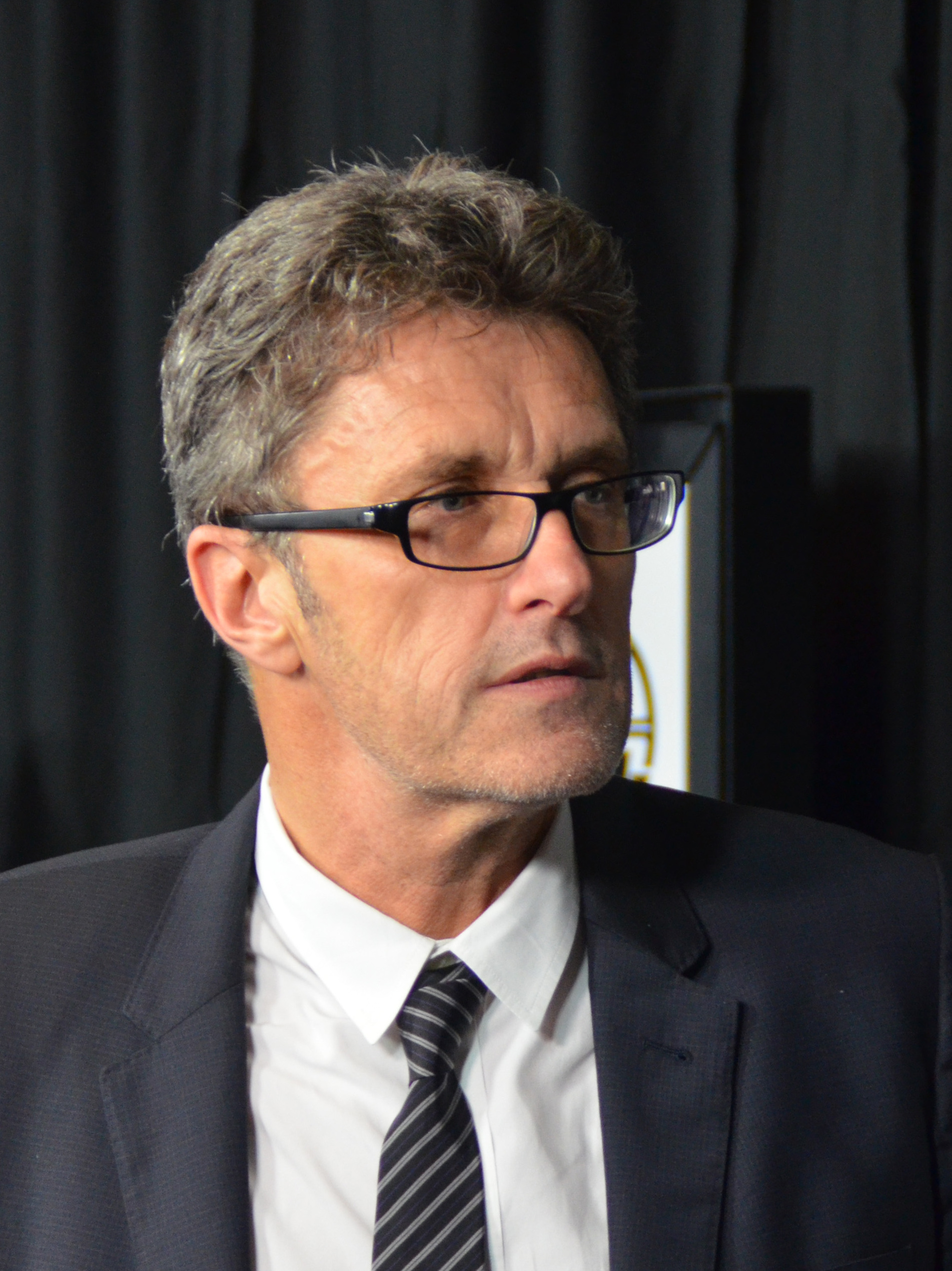
Pawel Pawlikowski won for Ida (2014).

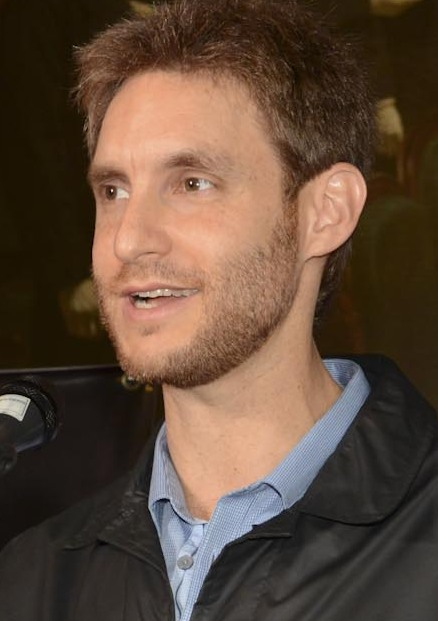
Damian Szifron won for Wild Tales (2015).

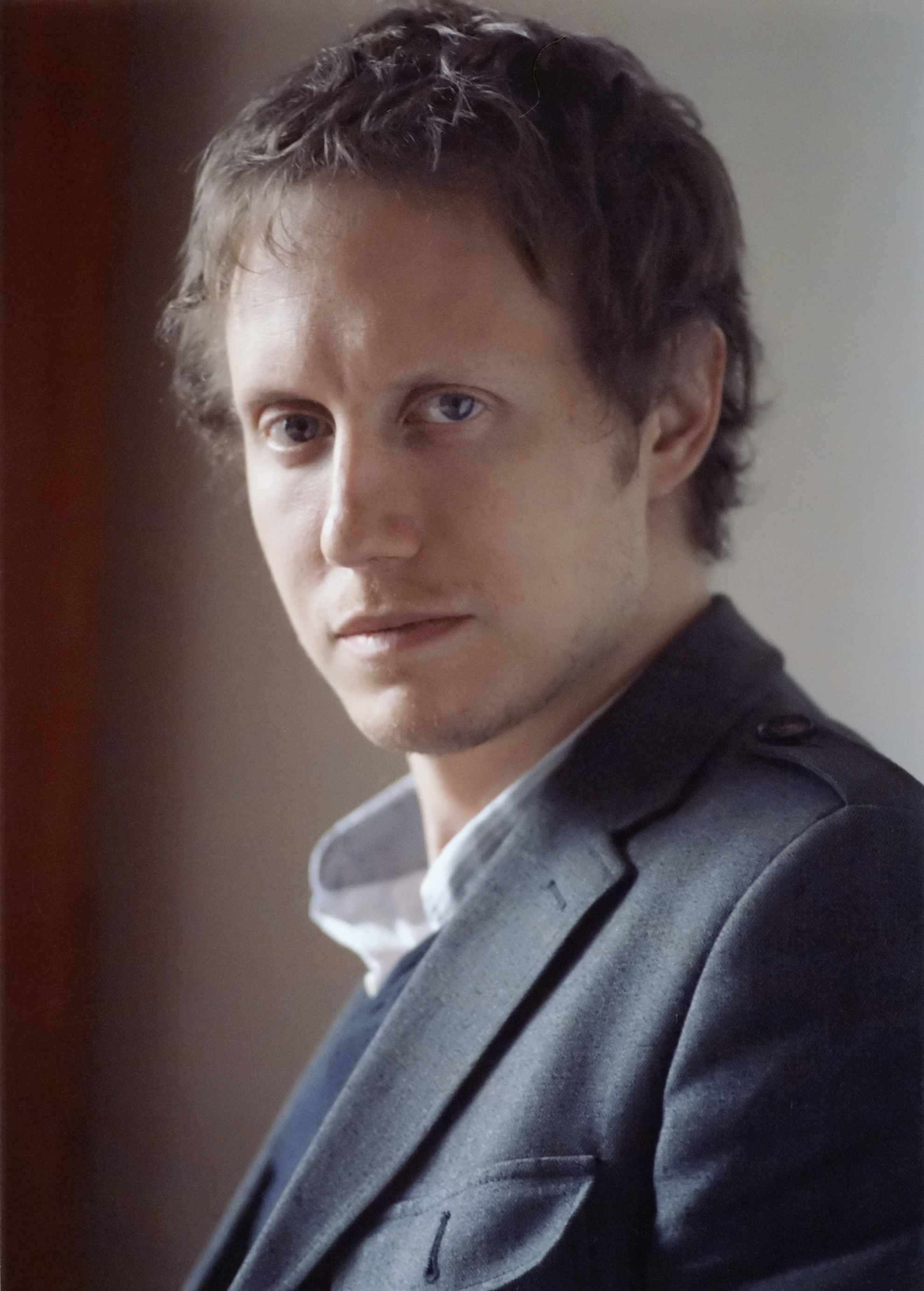
László Nemes won for Son of Saul (2016).

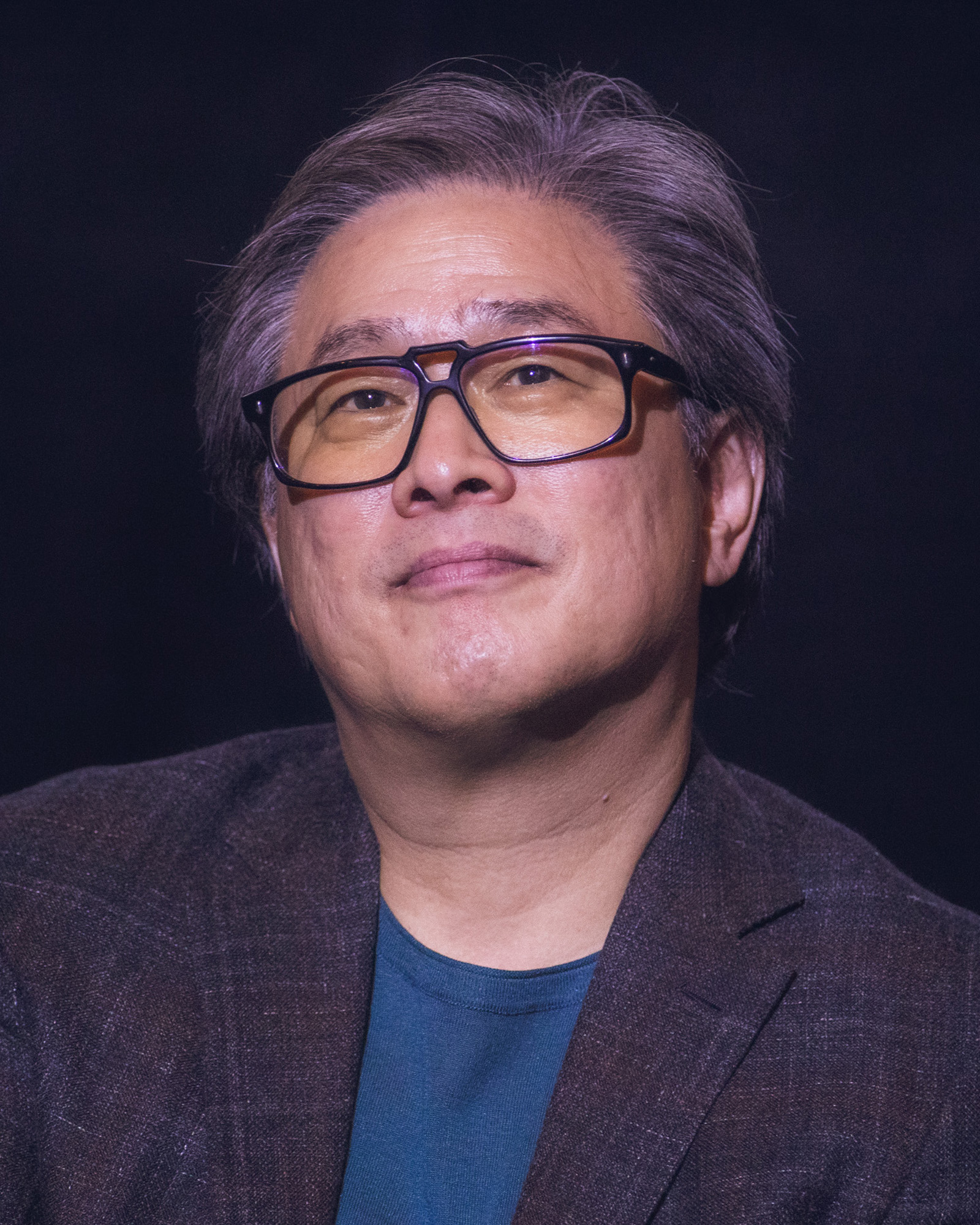
Park Chan-wook won for The Handmaiden (2017).

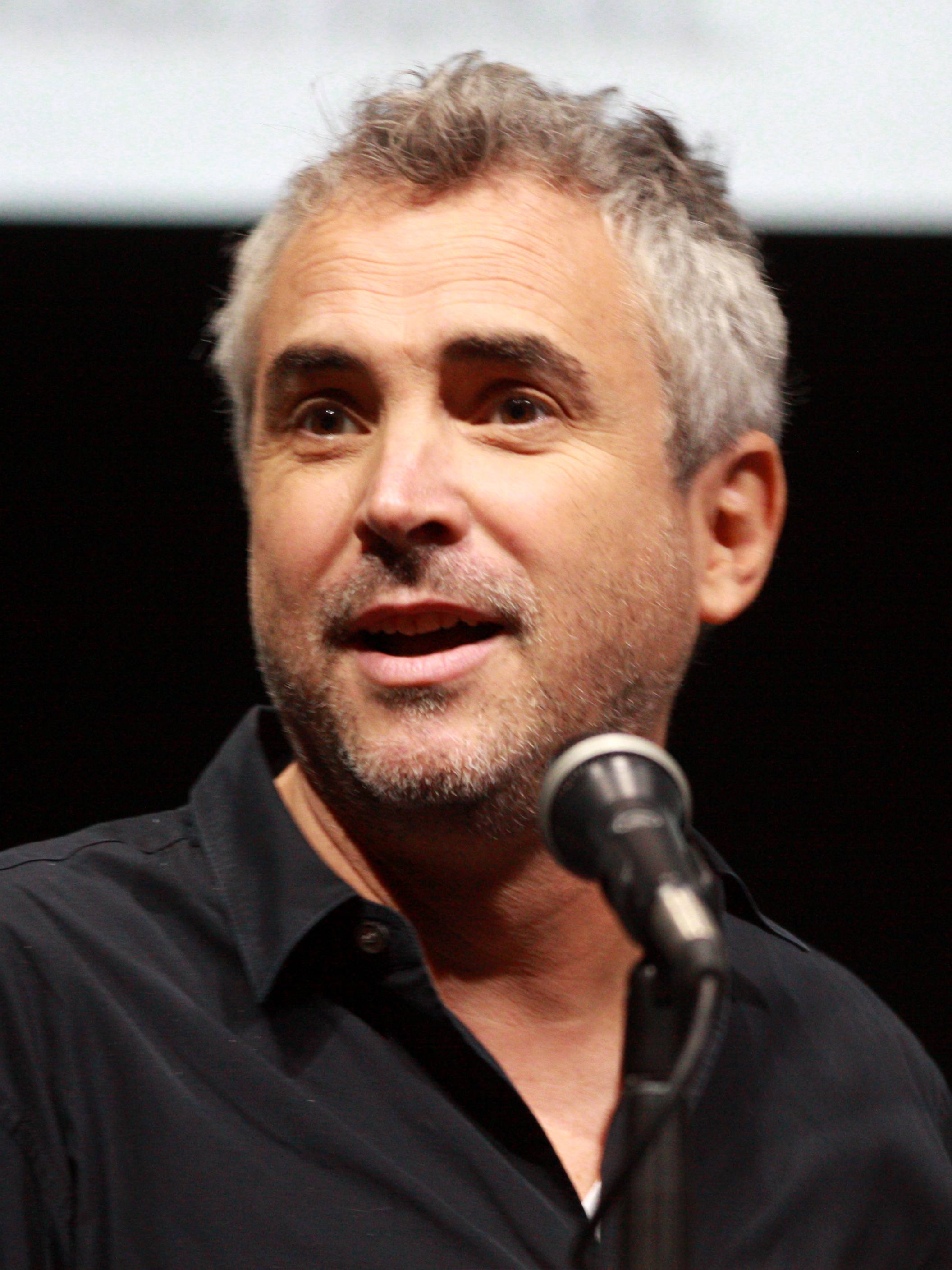
Alfonso Cuarón won for Roma (2018).

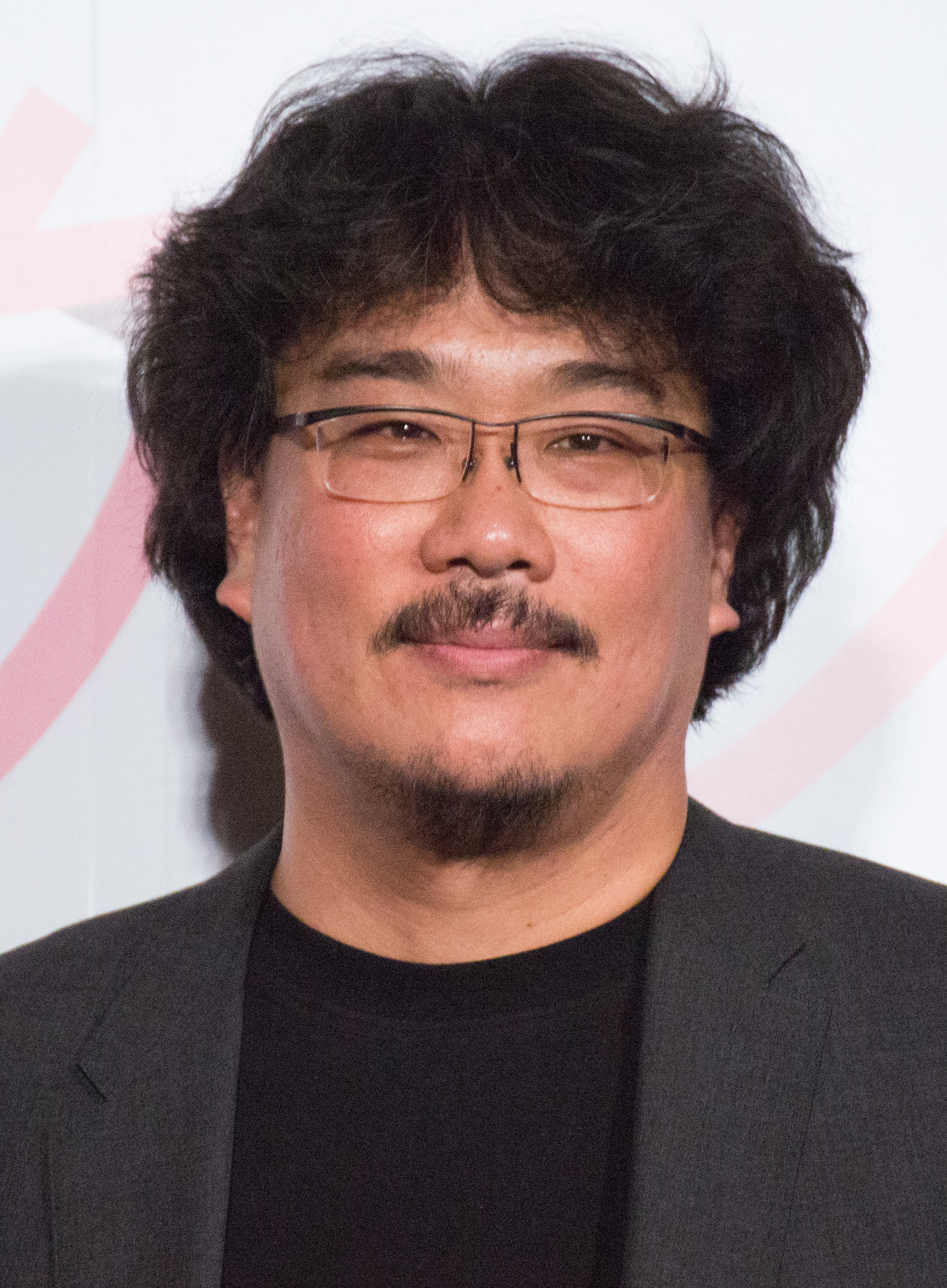
Bong Joon-ho won for Parasite (2019).

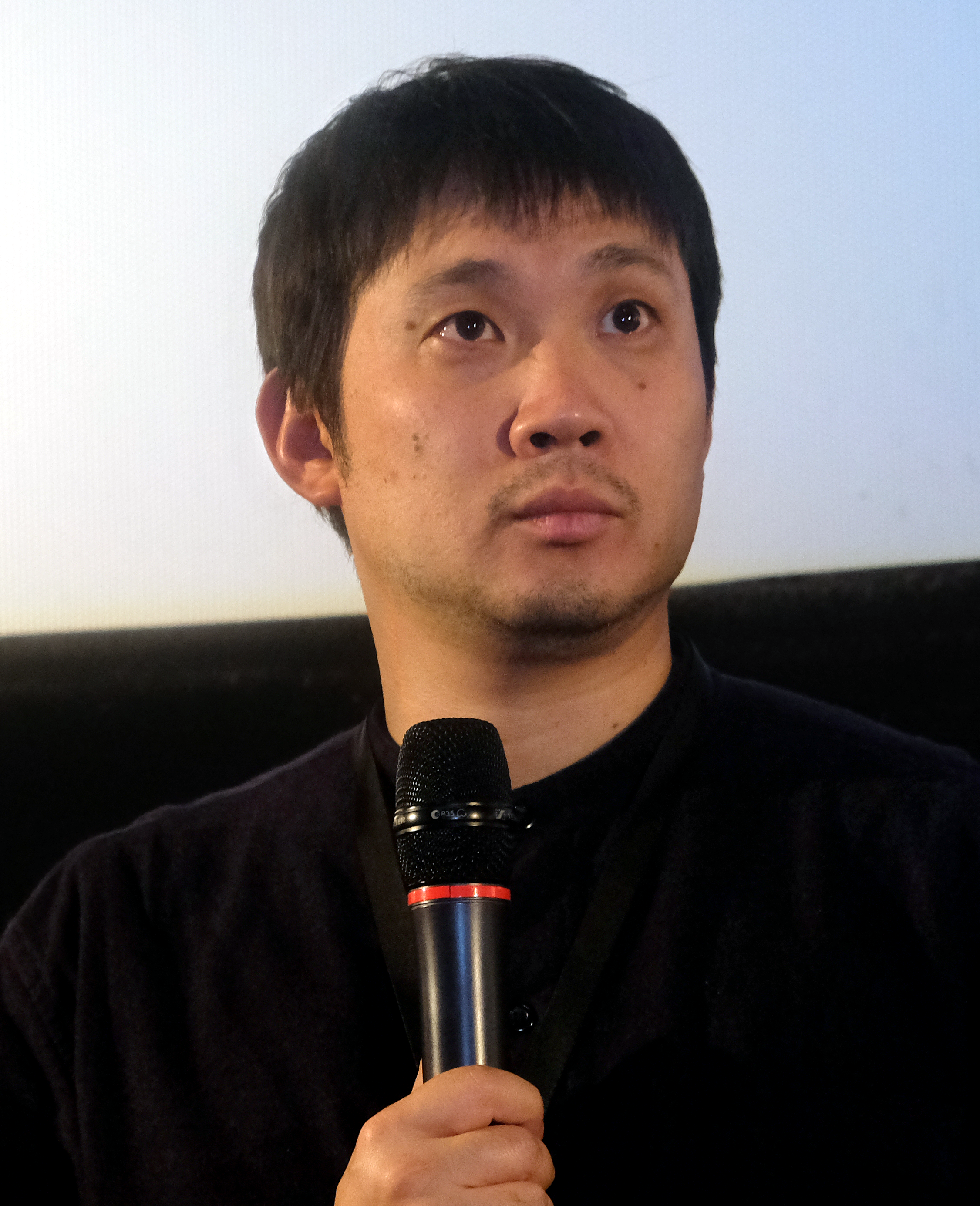
Ryusuke Hamaguchi won for Drive My Car (2021).

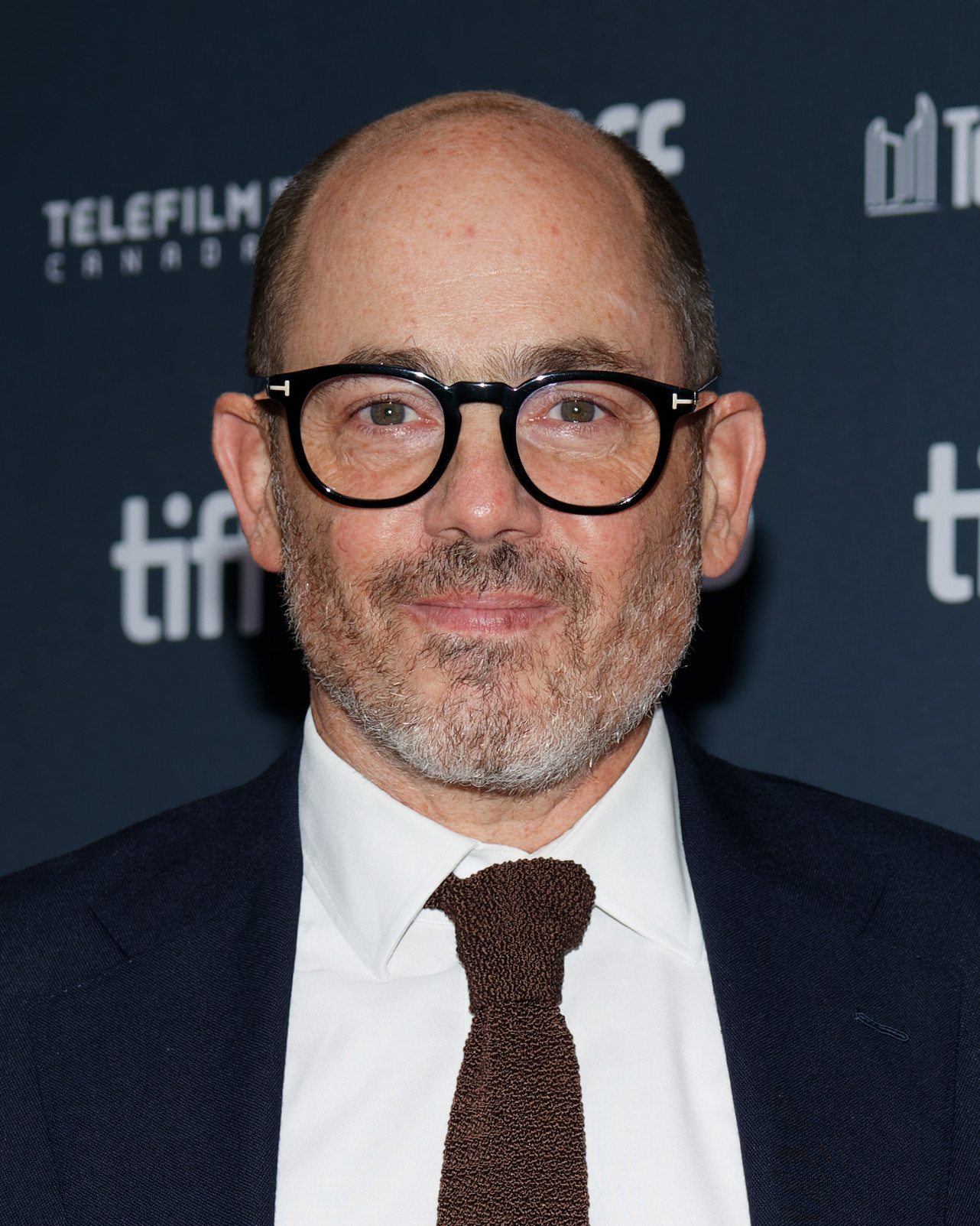
Edward Berger won for All Quiet on the Western Front (2022).

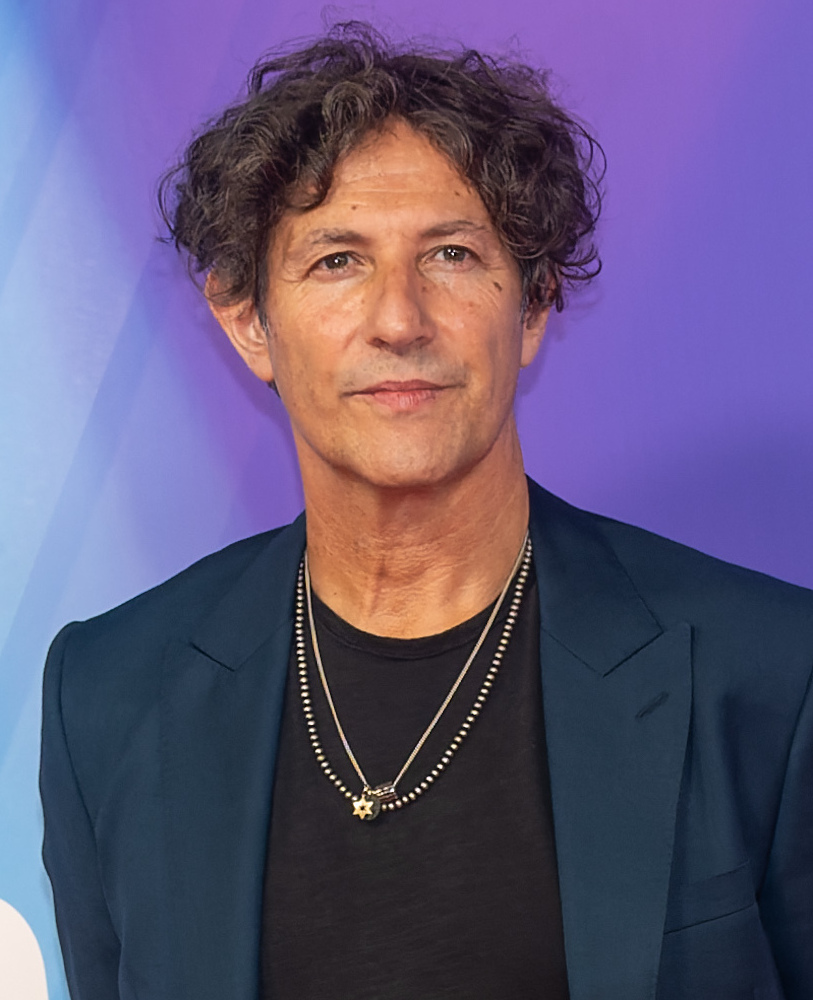
Jonathan Glazer won for The Zone of Interest (2023).

=== 1980s ===
Year	Film	Winner(s) / Nominee(s)	Country
**1982** (36th)	**Christ Stopped at Eboli**	**Francesco Rosi**	**Italy, France**
**1982** (36th)	Das Boot	Wolfgang Petersen	West Germany
**1982** (36th)	Diva	Jean-Jacques Beineix	France
**1982** (36th)	Fitzcarraldo	Werner Herzog	West Germany, Peru
**1983** (37th)	**Danton**	**Andrzej Wajda, Margaret Ménégoz, Barbara Pec-Ślesicka**	**France, Poland**
**1983** (37th)	Confidentially Yours	Armand Barbault, François Truffaut	France
**1983** (37th)	Fanny and Alexander	Ingmar Bergman, Jörn Donner	Sweden
**1983** (37th)	La Traviata	Franco Zeffirelli, Tarak Ben Ammar	Italy
**1984** (38th)	**Carmen**	**Carlos Saura, Emiliano Piedra**	**Spain**
**1984** (38th)	The Return of Martin Guerre	Daniel Vigne	France
**1984** (38th)	Swann in Love	Volker Schlöndorff, Margaret Ménégoz	France, West Germany
**1984** (38th)	A Sunday in the Country	Bertrand Tavernier, Alain Sarde	France
**1985** (39th)	**Colonel Redl**	**István Szabó, Manfred Durniok**	**West Germany, Hungary, Austria**
**1985** (39th)	Carmen	Francesco Rosi, Patrice Ledoux	France, Italy
**1985** (39th)	Dim Sum: A Little Bit of Heart	Tom Sternberg, Wayne Wang, Danny Yung	United States
**1985** (39th)	Subway	Luc Besson, François Ruggieri	France
**1986** (40th)	**Ran**	**Akira Kurosawa, Serge Silberman, Masato Hara**	**Japan**
**1986** (40th)	Betty Blue	Jean-Jacques Beineix	France
**1986** (40th)	Ginger and Fred	Federico Fellini, Alberto Grimaldi	Italy, France, West Germany
**1986** (40th)	Otello	Franco Zeffirelli, Yoram Globus, Menahem Golan	Italy
**1987** (41st)	**The Sacrifice**	**Andrei Tarkovsky, Anna-Lena Wibom**	**Sweden, France**
**1987** (41st)	Jean de Florette	Claude Berri	France
**1987** (41st)	My Life as a Dog	Lasse Hallström, Waldemar Bergendahl	Sweden
**1987** (41st)	Manon des Sources	Claude Berri	France
**1988** (42nd)	**Babette's Feast**	**Gabriel Axel, Just Betzer, Bo Christensen**	**Denmark**
**1988** (42nd)	Au revoir les enfants	Louis Malle	France, West Germany
**1988** (42nd)	Dark Eyes	Nikita Mikhalkov, Carlo Cucchi, Silvia D'Amico Bendico	Italy, Soviet Union
**1988** (42nd)	Wings of Desire	Wim Wenders, Anatole Dauman	West Germany
**1989** (43rd)	**Life and Nothing But**	**Bertrand Tavernier, René Cleitman**	**France**
**1989** (43rd)	Pelle the Conqueror	Bille August, Per Holst	Denmark, Sweden
**1989** (43rd)	Salaam Bombay!	Mira Nair	India
**1989** (43rd)	Women on the Verge of a Nervous Breakdown	Pedro Almodóvar, Agustín Almodóvar	Spain

=== 1990s ===
Year	Film	Winner(s) / Nominee(s)	Country
**1990** (44th)	**Cinema Paradiso**	**Giuseppe Tornatore, Franco Cristaldi**	**Italy**
**1990** (44th)	Jesus of Montreal	Denys Arcand, Roger Frappier, Pierre Gendron	Canada, France
**1990** (44th)	Milou in May	Louis Malle	France
**1990** (44th)	Mama, There's a Man in Your Bed	Coline Serreau, Jean-Louis Piel, Philippe Carcassonne	France
**1991** (45th)	**The Nasty Girl**	**Michael Verhoeven**	**West Germany**
**1991** (45th)	Cyrano de Bergerac	Jean-Paul Rappeneau, René Cleitman, Michel Seydoux	France
**1991** (45th)	The Hairdresser's Husband	Patrice Leconte, Thierry de Ganay	France
**1991** (45th)	Toto the Hero	Jaco Van Dormael, Pierre Drouot, Dany Geys	Belgium, France, Germany
**1992** (46th)	**Raise the Red Lantern**	**Zhang Yimou, Chiu Fu-sheng**	**China, Hong Kong, Taiwan**
**1992** (46th)	Les Amants du Pont-Neuf	Leos Carax, Christian Fechner	France
**1992** (46th)	Delicatessen	Jean-Pierre Jeunet, Marc Caro, Claudie Ossard	France
**1992** (46th)	Europa Europa	Agnieszka Holland, Artur Brauner, Margaret Ménégoz	Germany, France, Poland
**1993** (47th)	**Farewell My Concubine**	**Chen Kaige, Hsu Feng**	**China, Hong Kong**
**1993** (47th)	A Heart in Winter	Claude Sautet, Jean-Louis Livi, Philippe Carcassonne	France
**1993** (47th)	Like Water for Chocolate	Alfonso Arau	Mexico
**1993** (47th)	Indochine	Régis Wargnier, Eric Heumann	France
**1994** (48th)	**To Live**	**Zhang Yimou, Chiu Fu-sheng**	**China**
**1994** (48th)	Three Colours: Red	Krzysztof Kieślowski, Martin Karmitz	France, Poland
**1994** (48th)	Eat Drink Man Woman	Ang Lee, Hsu Li-kong	Taiwan, United States
**1994** (48th)	Belle Époque	Fernando Trueba	Spain
**1995** (49th)	**Il Postino**	**Michael Radford, Mario Cecchi Gori, Vittorio Cecchi Gori, Gaetano Daniele**	**Italy**
**1995** (49th)	Les Misérables	Claude Lelouch	France
**1995** (49th)	Burnt by the Sun	Nikita Mikhalkov, Michel Seydoux	Russia
**1995** (49th)	La Reine Margot	Patrice Chéreau, Pierre Grunstein	France, Italy, Germany
**1996** (50th)	**Ridicule**	**Patrice Leconte, Frédéric Brillion, Philippe Carcassonne, Gilles Legrand**	**France**
**1996** (50th)	Antonia's Line	Marleen Gorris, Hans de Weers	Netherlands
**1996** (50th)	Kolya	Jan Svěrák, Eric Abraham	Czech Republic
**1996** (50th)	Nelly and Mr. Arnaud	Claude Sautet, Alain Sarde	France
**1997** (51st)	**The Apartment**	**Gilles Mimouni, Georges Benayoun**	**France**
**1997** (51st)	Lucie Aubrac	Claude Berri	France
**1997** (51st)	Ma vie en rose	Alain Berliner, Carole Scotta	France, Belgium
**1997** (51st)	The Tango Lesson	Sally Potter, Christopher Sheppard	Argentina, United Kingdom, France
**1998** (52nd)	**Central Station**	**Walter Salles, Arthur Cohn, Martine de Clermont-Tonnerre**	**Brazil**
**1998** (52nd)	Live Flesh	Pedro Almodóvar, Agustín Almodóvar	Spain
**1998** (52nd)	Life Is Beautiful	Roberto Benigni, Elda Ferri, Gianluigi Braschi	Italy
**1998** (52nd)	On Guard	Philippe de Broca, Patrick Godeau	France
**1999** (53rd)	**All About My Mother**	**Pedro Almodóvar, Agustín Almodóvar**	**Spain**
**1999** (53rd)	Buena Vista Social Club	Wim Wenders, Ulrich Felsberg, Deepak Nayar	Germany, Cuba, United States
**1999** (53rd)	The Celebration	Thomas Vinterberg, Birgitte Hald	Denmark
**1999** (53rd)	Run Lola Run	Tom Tykwer, Stefan Arndt	Germany

=== 2000s ===
Year	Film	Winner(s) / Nominee(s)	Country
**2000** (54th)	**Crouching Tiger, Hidden Dragon**	**Hsu Li-kong, Bill Kong, Ang Lee**	**Taiwan, China, Hong Kong**
**2000** (54th)	Girl on the Bridge	Patrice Leconte, Christian Fechner	France
**2000** (54th)	In the Mood for Love	Wong Kar-wai	Hong Kong
**2000** (54th)	Harry, He's Here to Help	Dominik Moll, Michel Saint-Jean	France
**2000** (54th)	Malèna	Giuseppe Tornatore, Harvey Weinstein, Carlo Bernasconi	Italy
**2001** (55th)	**Amores perros**	**Alejandro González Iñárritu**	**Mexico**
**2001** (55th)	Amélie	Jean-Pierre Jeunet, Claudie Ossard	France
**2001** (55th)	Behind the Sun	Walter Salles, Arthur Cohn	Brazil
**2001** (55th)	Monsoon Wedding	Mira Nair, Caroline Baron	India
**2001** (55th)	The Piano Teacher	Michael Haneke, Veit Heiduschka	France, Austria, Germany
**2002** (56th)	**Talk to Her**	**Pedro Almodóvar, Agustín Almodóvar**	**Spain**
**2002** (56th)	City of God	Fernando Meirelles, Andrea Barata Ribeiro, Mauricio Andrade Ramos	Brazil
**2002** (56th)	Devdas	Sanjay Leela Bhansali, Bharat Shah	India
**2002** (56th)	The Warrior	Asif Kapadia, Bertrand Faivre	United Kingdom, India
**2002** (56th)	Y tu mamá también	Alfonso Cuarón, Jorge Vergara	Mexico
**2003** (57th)	**In This World**	**Michael Winterbottom, Andrew Eaton, Anita Overland**	**United Kingdom**
**2003** (57th)	The Barbarian Invasions	Denys Arcand, Daniel Louis, Denise Robert	Canada
**2003** (57th)	Good Bye, Lenin!	Wolfgang Becker, Stefan Arndt	Germany
**2003** (57th)	Spirited Away	Hayao Miyazaki, Toshio Suzuki	Japan
**2003** (57th)	To Be and to Have	Nicolas Philibert, Gilles Sandoz	France
**2003** (57th)	Belleville Rendez-vous	Sylvain Chomet, Didier Brunner	France, Canada
**2004** (58th)	**The Motorcycle Diaries**	**Walter Salles, Michael Nozik, Edgard Tenenbaum, Karen Tenkhoff**	**Argentina, Brazil**
**2004** (58th)	Bad Education	Pedro Almodóvar, Agustín Almodóvar	Spain
**2004** (58th)	The Chorus	Christophe Barratier, Arthur Cohn, Nicolas Mauvernay, Jacques Perrin	France
**2004** (58th)	House of Flying Daggers	Zhang Yimou, Bill Kong	China, Hong Kong
**2004** (58th)	A Very Long Engagement	Jean-Pierre Jeunet, Francis Boespflug	France
**2005** (59th)	**The Beat That My Heart Skipped**	**Jacques Audiard, Pascal Caucheteux**	**France**
**2005** (59th)	Joyeux Noël	Christian Carion, Christophe Rossignon	France, Germany, Belgium
**2005** (59th)	Kung Fu Hustle	Stephen Chow, Po Chu Chui, Jeff Lau	Hong Kong, China
**2005** (59th)	Le Grand Voyage	Ismaël Ferrouhki, Humbert Balsan	France, Morocco
**2005** (59th)	Tsotsi	Gavin Hood, Peter Fudakowski	South Africa
**2006** (60th)	**Pan's Labyrinth**	**Guillermo del Toro, Alfonso Cuarón, Álvaro Augustin**	**Spain, Mexico**
**2006** (60th)	Apocalypto	Mel Gibson, Bruce Davey	United States
**2006** (60th)	Black Book	Paul Verhoeven, San Fu Maltha, Teun Hilte, Jens Meurer	Netherlands, Germany, Belgium
**2006** (60th)	Rang De Basanti	Rakeysh Omprakash Mehra, Ronnie Screwvala	India
**2006** (60th)	Volver	Pedro Almodóvar, Agustín Almodóvar,	Spain
**2007** (61st)	**The Lives of Others**	**Florian Henckel von Donnersmarck, Quirin Berg, Max Wiedemann**	**Germany**
**2007** (61st)	The Diving Bell and the Butterfly	Julian Schnabel, Kathleen Kennedy, Jon Kilik	France
**2007** (61st)	The Kite Runner	Marc Forster, William Horberg, Walter F. Parkes, Rebecca Yeldham	United States
**2007** (61st)	La Vie en Rose	Olivier Dahan, Alain Goldman	France
**2007** (61st)	Lust, Caution	Ang Lee, Bill Kong, James Schamus	Taiwan
**2008** (62nd)	**I've Loved You So Long**	**Philippe Claudel, Yves Marmion**	**France**
**2008** (62nd)	The Baader Meinhof Complex	Uli Edel, Bernd Eichinger	Germany
**2008** (62nd)	Gomorrah	Matteo Garrone, Domenico Procacci	Italy
**2008** (62nd)	Persepolis	Marjane Satrapi, Vincent Paronnaud, Xavier Rigault, Marc-Antoine Robert	France
**2008** (62nd)	Waltz with Bashir	Ari Folman, Serge Lalou, Gerhard Meixner, Yael Nahlieli	Israel
**2009** (63rd)	**A Prophet**	**Jacques Audiard, Pascal Caucheteux, Marco Cherqui, Alix Raynaud**	**France**
**2009** (63rd)	Broken Embraces	Pedro Almodóvar, Agustín Almodóvar	Spain
**2009** (63rd)	Coco Before Chanel	Anne Fontaine, Caroline Benjo, Philippe Carcassonne, Carole Scotta	France, Belgium
**2009** (63rd)	Let the Right One In	Tomas Alfredson, Carl Molinder, John Nordling	Sweden
**2009** (63rd)	The White Ribbon	Michael Haneke, Stefan Arndt, Michael Katz, Veit Heiduschka, Margaret Ménégoz	Germany, Austria

=== 2010s ===
Year	Film	Winner(s) / Nominee(s)	Country
**2010** (64th)	**The Girl with the Dragon Tattoo**	**Niels Arden Oplev, Søren Stærmose**	**Sweden**
**2010** (64th)	I Am Love	Luca Guadagnino, Francesco Melzi d'Eril, Marco Morabito, Massimiliano Violante	**Italy**
**2010** (64th)	Biutiful	Alejandro González Iñárritu, Jon Kilik, Fernando Bovaira	Mexico, Spain
**2010** (64th)	Of Gods and Men	Xavier Beauvois, Pascal Caucheteux, Étienne Comar	France
**2010** (64th)	The Secret in Their Eyes	Juan José Campanella, Mariela Besuievski	Argentina
**2011** (65th)	**The Skin I Live In**	**Pedro Almodóvar, Agustín Almodóvar**	**Spain**
**2011** (65th)	Incendies	Denis Villeneuve, Luc Déry, Kim McCraw	Canada
**2011** (65th)	Pina	Wim Wenders, Gian-Piero Ringel	Germany
**2011** (65th)	Potiche	François Ozon, Eric Altmeyer, Nicolas Altmeyer	France
**2011** (65th)	A Separation	Asghar Farhadi	Iran
**2012** (66th)	**Amour**	**Michael Haneke, Margaret Ménégoz**	**France, Austria**
**2012** (66th)	Headhunters	Morten Tyldum, Marianne Gray, Asle Vatn	Norway
**2012** (66th)	The Hunt	Thomas Vinterberg, Morten Kaufmann, Sisse Graum Jørgensen	Denmark
**2012** (66th)	Rust and Bone	Jacques Audiard, Pascal Caucheteux	France, Belgium
**2012** (66th)	The Intouchables	Éric Toledano and Olivier Nakache, Nicolas Duval Adassovsky, Yann Zenou, Laurent Zeitoun	France
**2013** (67th)	**The Great Beauty**	**Paolo Sorrentino, Nicola Giuliano, Francesca Cima**	**Italy**
**2013** (67th)	The Act of Killing	Joshua Oppenheimer, Signe Byrge Sørensen	Denmark
**2013** (67th)	Blue Is the Warmest Colour	Abdellatif Kechiche, Brahim Chioua, Vincent Maraval	France, Belgium
**2013** (67th)	Metro Manila	Mathilde Charpentier, Sean Ellis	United Kingdom, Philippines
**2013** (67th)	Wadjda	Haifaa Al-Mansour, Gerhard Meixner, Roman Paul	Saudi Arabia
**2014** (68th)	**Ida**	**Pawel Pawlikowski, Eric Abraham, Piotr Dzięcioł, Ewa Puszczyńska**	**Poland**
**2014** (68th)	Leviathan	Andrey Zvyagintsev, Alexander Rodnyansky, Sergey Melkumov	Russia
**2014** (68th)	The Lunchbox	Ritesh Batra, Anurag Kashyap, Guneet Monga, Arun Rangachari	India
**2014** (68th)	Trash	Stephen Daldry, Tim Bevan, Eric Fellner, Kris Thykier	United Kingdom, Brazil
**2014** (68th)	Two Days, One Night	Jean-Pierre Dardenne and Luc Dardenne, Denis Freyd	Belgium, France
**2015** (69th)	**Wild Tales**	**Damián Szifron**	**Argentina**
**2015** (69th)	The Assassin	Hou Hsiao-hsien	Taiwan
**2015** (69th)	Force Majeure	Ruben Östlund	Sweden
**2015** (69th)	Theeb	Naji Abu Nowar	Jordan
**2015** (69th)	Timbuktu	Abderrahmane Sissako	Mauritania
**2016** (70th)	**Son of Saul**	**László Nemes, Gábor Sipos**	**Hungary**
**2016** (70th)	Dheepan	Jacques Audiard, Pascal Caucheteux	France
**2016** (70th)	Julieta	Pedro Almodóvar, Agustín Almodóvar	Spain
**2016** (70th)	Mustang	Deniz Gamze Ergüven, Charles Gillibert	Turkey, France
**2016** (70th)	Toni Erdmann	Maren Ade, Janine Jackowski	Germany, Austria
**2017** (71st)	**The Handmaiden**	**Park Chan-wook, Syd Lim**	**South Korea**
**2017** (71st)	Elle	Paul Verhoeven, Saïd Ben Saïd	France
**2017** (71st)	First They Killed My Father	Angelina Jolie, Rithy Panh	Cambodia, United States
**2017** (71st)	Loveless	Andrey Zvyagintsev, Alexander Rodnyansky	Russia
**2017** (71st)	The Salesman	Alexandre Mallet-Guy, Asghar Farhadi	Iran, France
**2018** (72nd)	**Roma**	**Alfonso Cuarón, Gabriela Rodríguez**	**Mexico**
**2018** (72nd)	Capernaum	Nadine Labaki, Khaled Mouzanar	Lebanon
**2018** (72nd)	Cold War	Paweł Pawlikowski, Tanya Seghatchian, Ewa Puszczyńska	Poland, France
**2018** (72nd)	Dogman	Matteo Garrone	Italy
**2018** (72nd)	Shoplifters	Hirokazu Kore-eda, Kaoru Matsuzaki	Japan
**2019** (73rd)	**Parasite**	**Bong Joon-ho**	**South Korea**
**2019** (73rd)	The Farewell	Lulu Wang, Daniele Melia	United States
**2019** (73rd)	For Sama	Waad Al-Kateab, Edward Watts	Syria, United Kingdom
**2019** (73rd)	Pain and Glory	Pedro Almodóvar, Agustín Almodóvar	Spain
**2019** (73rd)	Portrait of a Lady on Fire	Céline Sciamma, Bénédicte Couvreur	France

=== 2020s ===
Year	Film	Winner(s) / Nominee(s)	Country
**2020** (74th)	**Another Round**	**Thomas Vinterberg, Kasper Dissing, Sisse Graum Jørgensen**	**Denmark**
**2020** (74th)	Dear Comrades!	Andrei Konchalovsky, Alisher Usmanov	Russia
**2020** (74th)	Les Misérables	Ladj Ly, Toufik Ayadi, Christophe Barral	France
**2020** (74th)	Minari	Lee Isaac Chung, Christina Oh	United States
**2020** (74th)	Quo Vadis, Aida?	Jasmila Žbanić, Damir Ibrahimović	Bosnia and Herzegovina
**2021** (75th)	**Drive My Car**	**Ryusuke Hamaguchi, Teruhisa Yamamoto**	**Japan**
**2021** (75th)	The Hand of God	Paolo Sorrentino, Lorenzo Mieli	Italy
**2021** (75th)	Parallel Mothers	Pedro Almodóvar, Agustín Almodóvar	Spain
**2021** (75th)	Petite Maman	Céline Sciamma, Bénédicte Couvreur	France
**2021** (75th)	The Worst Person in the World	Joachim Trier, Thomas Robsahm	Norway
**2022** (76th)
**2022** (76th)	**All Quiet on the Western Front**	**Edward Berger, Malte Grunert**	**Germany**
**2022** (76th)	Argentina, 1985	Santiago Mitre, Axel Kuschevatzky, Federico Posternak, Agustina Llambi-Campbell, Victoria Alonso	Argentina
**2022** (76th)	Corsage	Marie Kreutzer, Alexander Glehr	Austria, Germany, Luxembourg, France
**2022** (76th)	Decision to Leave	Park Chan-wook, Ko Dae-seok	South Korea
**2022** (76th)	The Quiet Girl	Colm Bairéad, Cleona Ní Chrualaoí	Ireland
**2023** (77th)
**2023** (77th)	**The Zone of Interest**	**Jonathan Glazer, James Wilson**	**United Kingdom**
**2023** (77th)	20 Days in Mariupol	Mstyslav Chernov, Raney Aronson-Rath, Michelle Mizner	Ukraine
**2023** (77th)	Anatomy of a Fall	Justine Triet, Marie-Ange Luciani, David Thion	France
**2023** (77th)	Past Lives	Celine Song, David Hinojosa, Christine Vachon, Pamela Koffler	United States
**2023** (77th)	Society of the Snow	J.A. Bayona, Belén Atienza, Sandra Hermida	Spain
**2024** (78th)
**2024** (78th)	**Emilia Pérez**	**Jacques Audiard, Pascal Caucheteux**	**France**
**2024** (78th)	All We Imagine as Light	Payal Kapadia, Thomas Hakim	India
**2024** (78th)	I'm Still Here	Walter Salles, Maria Carlota Bruno, Rodrigo Teixeira	Brazil, France
**2024** (78th)	Kneecap	Rich Peppiatt, Jack Tarling, Trevor Birney	Ireland, United Kingdom
**2024** (78th)	The Seed of the Sacred Fig	Mohammad Rasoulof, Amin Sadraei	Iran, Germany
**2025** (79th)
**2025** (79th)	**Sentimental Value**	**Joachim Trier, Maria Ekerhovd, Andrea Berentsen Ottmar**	**Norway**
**2025** (79th)	It Was Just an Accident	Jafar Panahi, Philippe Martin	France
**2025** (79th)	The Secret Agent	Kleber Mendonça Filho, Emilie Lesclaux	Brazil
**2025** (79th)	Sirāt	Oliver Laxe, Domingo Corral	Spain
**2025** (79th)	The Voice of Hind Rajab	Kaouther Ben Hania, Nadim Cheikhrouha	Tunisia

== Longlist finalists ==
These are the additional films that appeared in the longlists.

Year	Finalists	Ref.
2011	Abel; As If I Am Not There; The Boy Mir – Ten Years in Afghanistan; Calvet; Dhobi Ghat (Mumbai Diaries); Little White Lies; Post Mortem; Le quattro volte; Tomboy; The Troll Hunter	
2020	Bacurau; Collective; I'm No Longer Here; The Life Ahead; The Mole Agent; New Order; The Painter and the Thief; System Crasher; The Traitor; The Truffle Hunters	
2021	A Hero; Bad Luck Banging or Loony Porn; Compartment No. 6; Flee; I'm Your Man; Lamb; The Most Beautiful Boy in the World; Paris, 13th District; Riders of Justice; Titane	
2022	Bardo, False Chronicle of a Handful of Truths; Close; EO; Holy Spider; RRR	
2023	The Boy and the Heron; The Eight Mountains; Fallen Leaves; The Taste of Things; The Teachers' Lounge	
2024	Black Dog; The Count of Monte Cristo; Flow; The Girl with the Needle; La chimera	
2025	La grazia; Left-Handed Girl; No Other Choice; Nouvelle Vague; Rental Family	

== Multiple awards and nominations ==
9 individuals have won the award multiple times.

Awards	Nominations	Director
3	11	Pedro Almodóvar & Agustín Almodóvar
3	6	Pascal Caucheteux
3	5	Jacques Audiard
2	5	Margaret Ménégoz
2	4	Walter Salles
2	3	Alfonso Cuarón
2	3	Zhang Yimou
2	2	Chiu Fu-sheng
1	3	Philippe Carcassonne
1	3	Arthur Cohn
1	3	Michael Haneke
1	3	Bill Kong
1	3	Patrice Leconte
1	3	Ang Lee
1	3	Thomas Vinterberg
1	2	Eric Abraham
1	2	Hsu Li-kong
1	2	Alejandro González Iñárritu
1	2	Sisse Graum Jørgensen
1	2	Park Chan-wook
1	2	Paweł Pawlikowski & Ewa Puszczyńska
1	2	Francesco Rosi
1	2	Paolo Sorrentino
1	2	Bertrand Tavernier
1	2	Giuseppe Tornator
1	2	Joachim Trier
0	3	Stefan Arndt
0	3	Claude Berri
0	3	Jean-Pierre Jeunet
0	3	Wim Wenders
0	2	Denys Arcand
0	2	Veit Heiduschka
0	2	Asghar Farhadi
0	2	Matteo Garrone
0	2	Louis Malle
0	2	Nikita Mikhalkov
0	2	Mira Nair
0	2	Andrey Zvyagintsev & Alexander Rodnyansky
0	2	Claudie Ossard
0	2	Alain Sarde
0	2	Claude Sautet
0	2	Céline Sciamma & Bénédicte Couvreur
0	2	Michel Seydoux
0	2	Paul Verhoeven
0	2	Franco Zeffirelli

== Awards by nation ==
Country	Number of winning films	Number of nominated films
France	7	53
Spain	5	17
Italy	4	17
Germany (Note: Includes films of West Germany.)	4	11
Mexico	3	3
Sweden	2	4
Denmark	2	4
Japan	2	4
Argentina	2	3
South Korea	2	3
United Kingdom (Note: Films which contain primarily non-English dialogue.)	2	2
Brazil	1	5
Poland	1	5
China	4	5
Norway	1	3
Taiwan	2	5
Hungary	1	2
India (Note: Films which contain primarily Hindi dialogue.)	0	6
United States (Note: Films which contain primarily non-English dialogue with the exception of Dim Sum: A Little Bit of Heart (1985).)	0	7
Russia	0	4
Canada (Note: Films which contain primarily French dialogue.)	0	3
Belgium	0	2
Hong Kong (Note: Films which contain primarily Cantonese dialogue.)	3	5
Iran	0	2
Netherlands	0	2
Cambodia	0	1
Czech Republic	0	1
Israel	0	1
Jordan	0	1
Lebanon	0	1
Mauritania	0	1
Saudi Arabia	0	1
South Africa (Note: Films which contain primarily non-English dialogue.)	0	1
Syria	0	1
Tunisia	0	1
Turkey	0	1
Bosnia and Herzegovina	0	1
Austria	0	1
Ireland (Note: Films which contain primarily non-English dialogue.)	0	1
Ukraine	0	1

== See also ==
- Academy Award for Best International Feature Film
- César Award for Best Foreign Film
