= Cinereach =

U.S. nonprofit organization

- Formation: 2006; 20 years ago
- Type: Nonprofit
- Legal status: Foundation
- Purpose: Film funding
- Headquarters: New York, NY
- Founder & Executive Director: Philipp Engelhorn
- Co-Founder: Michael Raisler
- Website: cinereach.org

Cinereach is a nonprofit story incubator and media production company working at the intersection of impact storytelling and popular entertainment. Founded as a film foundation and production company in New York, NY in 2006, the organization provided grants, awards, and an annual fellowship, working closely with other film development organizations such as the Sundance Institute and other film funding organizations. In 2021, Cinereach expanded to incorporate a systems thinking approach to developing original content, and began working in additional media including television and video games.

== History ==
Films supported by Cinereach in the past include: Marcel the Shell with Shoes On, Beasts of the Southern Wild, The Florida Project, The Assistant, After Yang, I Am Not Your Negro, Return, Donor Unknown, The Forgiveness of Blood, Pariah, Entre nos, Bully, The Boy Mir, Kinyarwanda, Circumstance, Akicita: The Battle of Standing Rock, Black Mother, Chained for Life, Hale County This Morning, This Evening, Matangi/Maya/M.I.A., Monsters and Men, Night Comes On, Phantom Cowboys, Shirkers, Sorry to Bother You, This Is Congo, Wild Nights with Emily and Suburban Fury.

Collectively, films supported by Cinereach have received seven Academy Award nominations, over twenty Sundance wins, over twenty five Independent Spirit Award nominations, and over forty Gotham Award nominations.

Filmmakers that have been supported by Cinereach have included Sean Baker, Boots Riley, Damien Chazelle, Chloé Zhao, Ryan Coogler, Robert Eggers, Barry Jenkins, Kelly Reichardt, Dee Rees, Karin Chien, Julie Goldman, Lars Knudsen, Heather Rae, Joslyn Barnes, Shrihari Sathe and Jay van Hoy.

== Expansion ==
With a growing interest in narrative change and systems thinking, Cinereach developed a research and development process to further understand how to create stories that cut through silos and move audiences to greater curiosity, empathy, and agency. The insight garnered from this research enables Cinereach to strategically partner with storytellers and other organizations to create original content in film, television, video games, and other media.

The organization also continues to invest in film productions that align with their values, including Reality (2023), Tuesday (2023), Mustache (2023), and musical documentary New Wave (2024).
