= Iro Haarla =

Finnish jazz musician

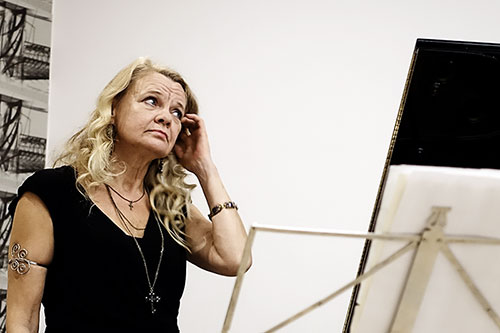
- Haarla in 2014

Background information
- Born: 7 November 1956 (age 69); Tampere, Finland
- Genres: Jazz
- Instruments: Piano, keyboards, harpsichord, accordion
- Labels: ECM Records; TUM Records
- Website: Official website

Iro Haarla (born 7 November 1956) is a Finnish jazz pianist and harpist, as well as composer and band leader.

== Career ==
At the Sibelius Academy, in Helsinki, Haarla studied classical piano under Izumi Tateno, musical composition under Einar Englund, and improvisation under Heikki Sarmanto. She was initially intending to become a concert pianist, but pivoted to jazz upon meeting the jazz drummer Edward Vesala in 1978.

She first became known as the arranger of the works of Vesala for his 'Sound & Fury' ensemble. They went on to collaborate extensively over two decades, and in a 2008 Washington Post interview, she stated that during that time she did not play her own music at all but was instead totally focused on supporting Vesala. As part of her support role she also broadened her instrument repertoire to keyboards, the accordion and especially the harp, in which she is entirely self-taught.

Vesala died in 1999, and afterwards Haarla launched her solo career, performing in and leading numerous ensembles. She also went on to record several albums, both as a leader and ensemble artist.

Haarla's music has been characterised as "sit[ting] at that mystical halfway point between improv and composition". Her piano-playing has been described as having a "weightless, displaced" quality, and her harp "delicate romanticism".

== Recognition ==
Haarla has received two Emma awards for the jazz record of the year, in 2005 (Penguin Beguine) and 2011 (Vespers).

In 2006, she was awarded the Yrjö prize by the Finnish Jazz Federation.

In 2018, Haarla received the Ted Curson award at the Pori Jazz Festival.

In 2020, she was recognised with the Suomen Jazzlegenda (lit. 'Jazz Legend of Finland') award.

== Personal life ==
Iro Haarla's parents were the actor Saulo Haarla and his first wife, opera singer Helena Salonius.

Haarla was married to Edward Vesala, until his death in 1999.

Later she married the bassist Ulf Krokfors, with whom both herself and Vesala had collaborated extensively.

== Discography ==
- Yarra Yarra (2001), with Pertti Päivinen
- Heart of a Bird (2003)
- Northbound (2005)
- Penguin Beguine (2005), with Haarla-Krokfors Loco Motife
- The Sky Is Ruby (2007)
- Vespers (2011), with Iro Haarla Quintet
- Kolibri (2013), with Iro Haarla Sextet
- Kirkastus (2015)
- Ante Lucem (2016), for Symphony Orchestra and Jazz Quintet
- Vodjanoi (2020)
