= Pascal Caucheteux =

French film producer

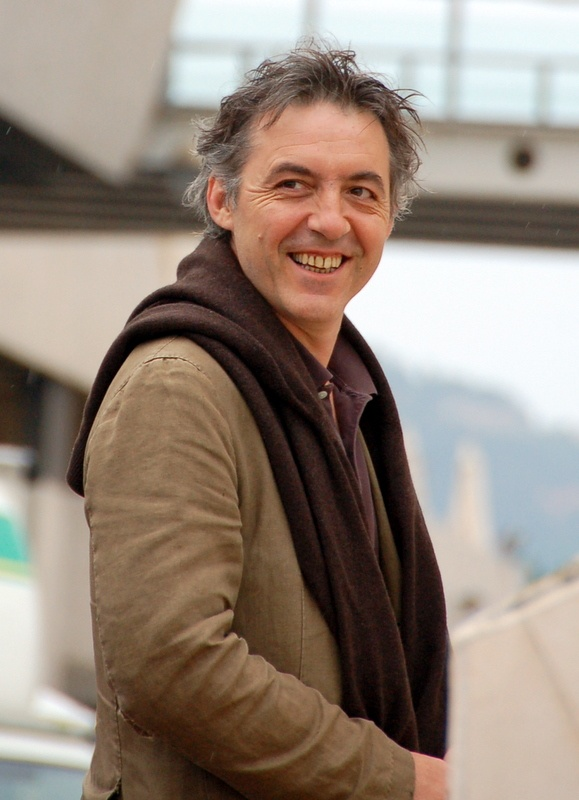
- Caucheteux in 2008
- Born: 27 March 1961 (age 64); Vincennes, France
- Occupation: Film producer
- Years active: 1991–present

Pascal Caucheteux (born 27 March 1961) is a French film producer. In 1990, together with Grégoire Sorlat, he founded the company Why Not Productions to finance French auteur cinema, in which he is considered a pivotal figure. He won three British Academy Film Awards and was nominated for five more in the categories Best Film, Outstanding British Film and Best Film Not in the English Language.

At the 97th Academy Awards, he was nominated for an Academy Award in the category Best Picture for the film Emilia Pérez. His nomination was shared with Jacques Audiard.

== Selected filmography ==
- The Beat That My Heart Skipped (2005)
- A Prophet (2009)
- Of Gods and Men (2010)
- Rust and Bone (2012)
- Dheepan (2015)
- You Were Never Really Here (2017)
- Emilia Pérez (2024)
