= Saulo Haarla =

Finnish actor and theatre manager

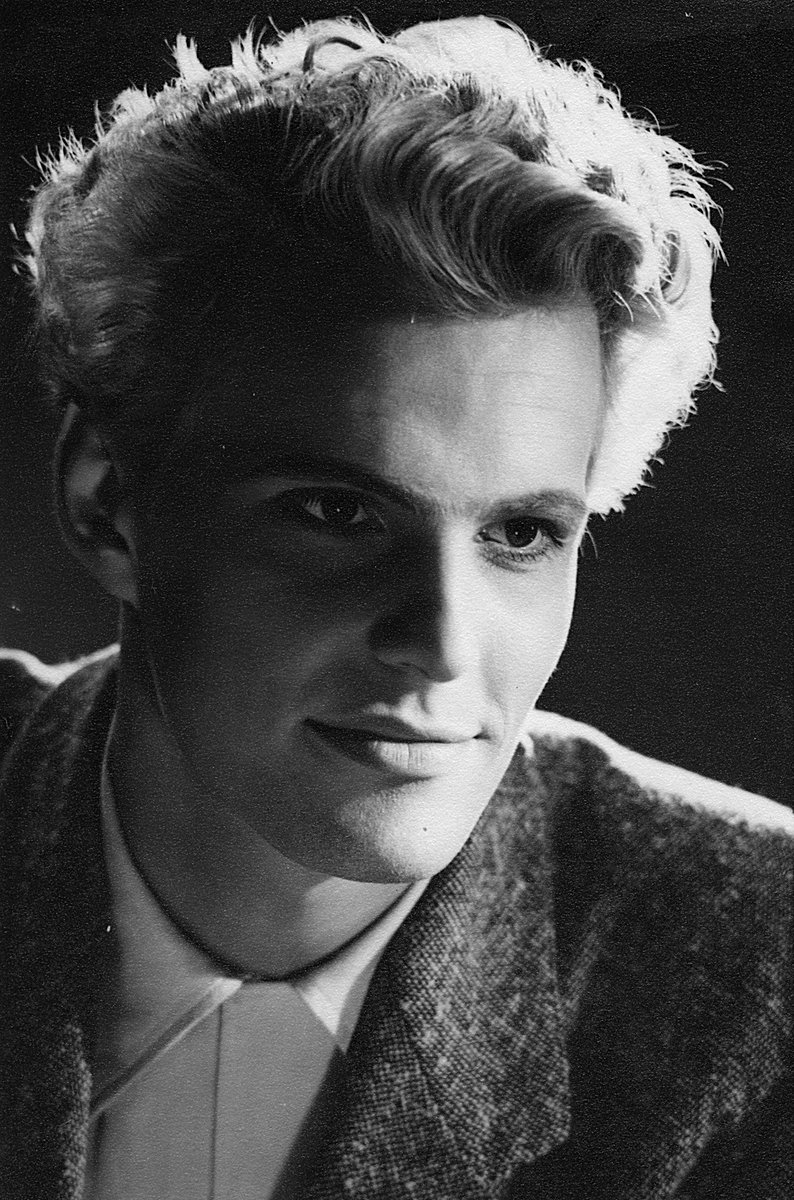
Saulo Ismaro Haarla

Saulo Ismaro Haarla (21 November 1930, Helsinki – 4 October 1971) was a Finnish actor and theatre manager. He appeared in seven films between 1951–1961 and worked as a theatre manager in the Oulu City Theatre 1970–1971. Having been a heavy drinker, Haarla died in 1971 at the age of 40. His wife was the opera singer Helena Salonius, and they had two children, including the jazz musician Iro Haarla.

== Filmography ==
- Tukkijoella (1951)
- Yö on pitkä (1952)
- The Milkmaid (1953)
- Rantasalmen sulttaani (1953)
- Oi, muistatkos... (1954)
- The Unknown Soldier (1955)
- Pekka ja Pätkä sammakkomiehinä (1957)
- Kaasua, komisario Palmu! (1961)
