= Rosa Liksom =

Finnish writer and artist

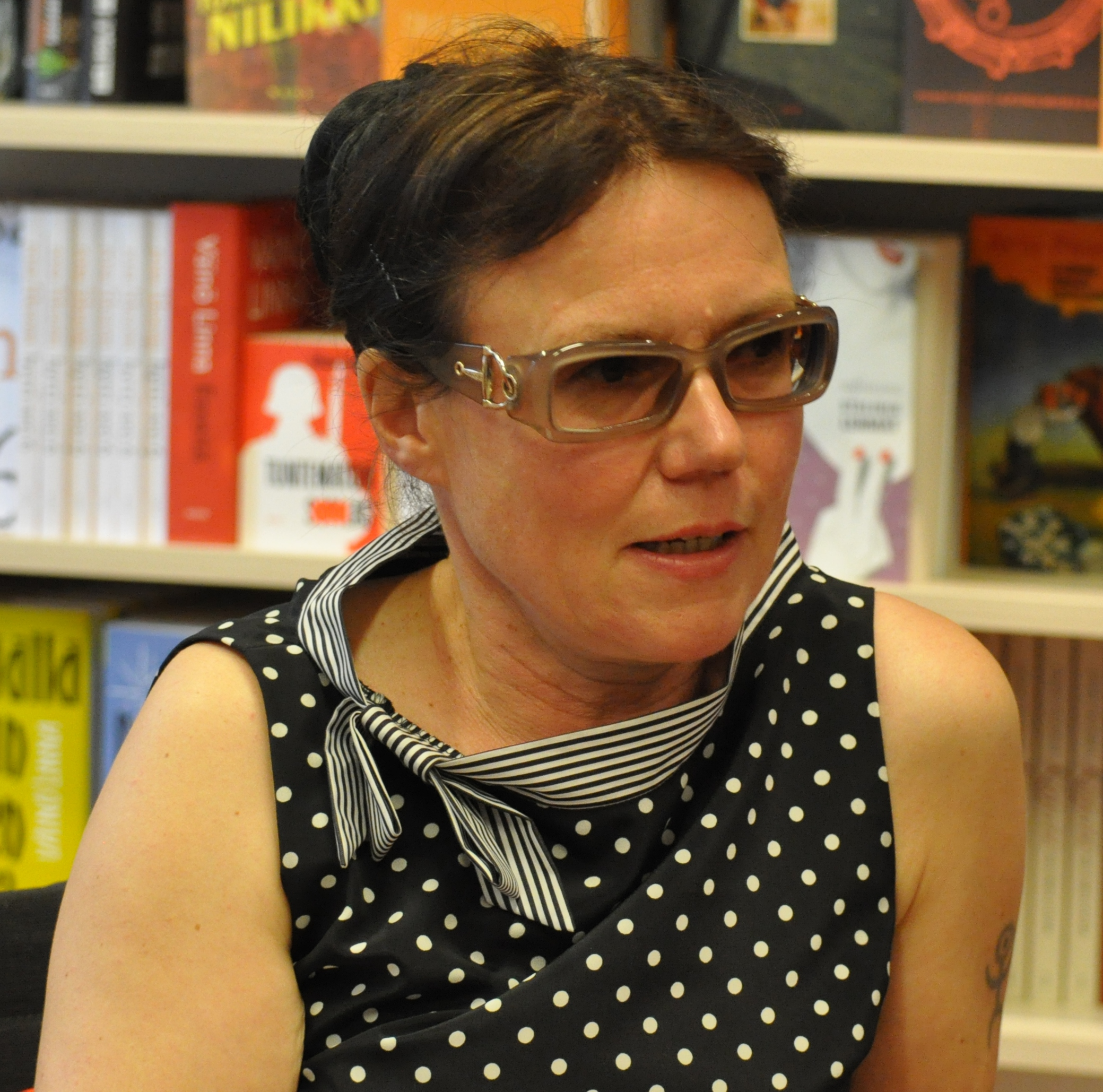
- Born: Anni Ylävaara; 7 January 1958 (age 68); Ylitornio, Lapland, Finland
- Education: University of Helsinki; University of Copenhagen; University of Moscow
- Writing career
- Pen name: Rosa Liksom
- Period: 1985 - present
- Notable works: Yhden yön pysäkki; Hytti nro 6
- Website: www.rosaliksom.com/home

Liksom presenting herself in Finnish at the Gothenburg bookfair in 2012.

Rosa Liksom (born Anni Ylävaara, Ylitornio, 7 January 1958) is a Finnish writer and artist.

== Biography ==
Rosa Liksom was born and raised in the Meänkieli-speaking town of Ylitornio in Finnish Lapland. As a teenager she moved to Rovaniemi and then to Helsinki. She studied in the fields of anthropology and social sciences at the universities of Helsinki, Copenhagen and Moscow. She won the J. H. Erkko Award in 1985 for her debut novel Yhden yön pysäkki and the Finlandia Prize in 2011 for Hytti nro 6. Of these, the 2021 film version based on Hytti nro 6 was selected to compete for the Palme d'Or at the 2021 Cannes Film Festival, and it won the Grand Prix. In 2016, the French government appointed Liksom a Chevalier (Knight) of the Ordre des Arts et des Lettres.

== Works ==
=== Short stories ===
- Yhden yön pysäkki (One Night Stands), 1985
- Unohdettu vartti (The Forgotten Quarter-Hour), 1986
- Väliasema Gagarin, 1987
- Go Moskova go, 1988
- Tyhjän tien paratiisit, 1989
- Bamalama, 1993
- Perhe, 2000
- Maa, 2006

=== Novels ===
- Kreisland, Helsinki 1996
- Reitari, Helsinki 2002
- Hytti nro 6, Helsinki 2011
- Väliaikainen, Helsinki: Like, 2014. ISBN 978-952-01-1096-3.
- Burka, Helsinki: Like, 2014. ISBN 978-952-01-1127-4.
- Everstinna, Helsinki: Like, 2017. ISBN 978-952-01-1656-9.
- Väylä, Helsinki: Like, 2021. ISBN 978-951-1-39955-1.

=== Children's books ===
- Jepata Nastan lentomatka, 2002
- Tivoli Tähtisade 2004
