= Compartment No. 6 =

2021 Finnish-Russian road drama

- International promotional poster
- Finnish: Hytti nro 6
- Directed by: Juho Kuosmanen
- Screenplay by: Andris Feldmanis; Livia Ulman; Juho Kuosmanen
- Based on: Compartment No. 6 by Rosa Liksom
- Produced by: Emilia Haukka; Jussi Rantamäki
- Starring: Seidi Haarla; Yura Borisov
- Cinematography: Jani-Petteri Passi
- Edited by: Jussi Rautaniemi
- Production companies: Aamu Film Company; Amrion; Achtung Panda! Media; CTB Film Company
- Distributed by: B-Plan Distribution (Finland); Sony Pictures Releasing (Russia); BestFilm.eu (Estonia); eksystent distribution (Germany)
- Release dates: 10 July 2021 (Cannes); 29 October 2021 (Finland); 25 November 2021 (Russia); 3 December 2021 (Estonia); 31 March 2022 (Germany)
- Running time: 108 minutes
- Countries: Finland; Estonia; Germany; Russia
- Languages: Finnish; Russian
- Budget: €2.2 million
- Box office: $3.2 million

Compartment No. 6 (Finnish: Hytti nro 6; Russian: Купе номер шесть, romanized: Kupe nomer shest) is a 2021 drama road movie directed by Juho Kuosmanen, co-written with Andris Feldmanis and Livia Ulman. It is based on the 2011 novel of the same name by Rosa Liksom. It follows Laura (Seidi Haarla), a lesbian Finnish student traveling by train from Moscow to Murmansk to study the Kanozero Petroglyphs, in a shared compartment with a gruff Russian miner (Yura Borisov).

The film had its world premiere at the main competition of the 2021 Cannes Film Festival on 10 July, where it won the Grand Prix. It was theatrically released in Finland on 29 October by B-Plan Distribution.

It was selected as the Finnish submission for the Best International Feature Film at the 94th Academy Awards. It was one of the 15 shortlisted films, but was not nominated for the Oscar.

== Plot ==
In Moscow, Laura, a Finnish student, and her Russian girlfriend Irina have planned a trip to Murmansk to see ancient petroglyphs, but Irina cancels due to a scheduling conflict. Laura decides to make the trip alone. She shares her sleeping compartment with a Russian miner, Lyoha. He is drunk and brash, asking her to translate phrases into Finnish and then mocking the translation. When he asks how to say “I love you”, she tells him it is “haista vittu”, which means “fuck you”. He then asks her if she is going to Murmansk to work as a prostitute, and she angrily leaves the compartment. She asks to be moved to a different cabin, but the guard refuses. Unable to find anywhere else on the train to sleep, she returns to the compartment, where Lyoha is asleep. She sketches a picture of his sleeping face.

Laura gets off the train at the next stop, intending to travel back to Moscow. She calls Irina, but finds she is too busy to talk and spontaneously gets back on the train, where Lyoha has held her place in the compartment for her. He asks her if she took her bag because she thinks he is a thief, and she tells him she had planned to get off the train. They have a brief conversation in the dining carriage, and Laura tells him of her plan to visit the petroglyphs. She tells him she is in a relationship, but lies about having a boyfriend.

The train stops overnight in Petrozavodsk. Lyoha invites Laura to visit friends with him, but she declines. After getting off the train, she is accosted by a Russian man while using a payphone, but Lyokha intervenes. She goes with him to visit an elderly woman, where they drink moonshine. She wakes up the next morning badly hungover to find Lyoha chopping wood for their host. The woman tells Laura she “has found a good man”.

Laura encounters another tourist, Sasha, on the train and invites him to share their compartment. He plays the guitar, and Lyoha becomes angry and withdrawn, leaving the train at a stop to play with snow on the tracks. Laura watches him fall over, which he later denies. He also rudely declines a drink from her. After Sasha leaves, Laura finds that he has stolen her video camera and Lyoha commiserates. Laura tells him that she is in a same-sex relationship and confesses that she misses Irina less than she thought. As the train approaches Murmansk, they attempt to celebrate in the dining car but find they are out of everything except sandwiches and alcohol. Laura shows Lyoha her drawing of him, but when she asks him to reciprocate, he becomes frustrated and storms off. On their return to the carriage, they embrace and kiss. Lyoha behaves as if he does not want to continue the interaction.

After arriving in Murmansk, Laura finds there is no way to get to the petroglyphs by car in winter. Disappointed, she visits the open-cast mine where Lyoha works, and he comes to her hotel, offering to take her to the petroglyphs. The only way to reach the petroglyphs is by boat, and Lyokha persuades some local sailors to take them despite a gale warning. They reach the site of the petroglyphs but find nothing there. They play in the snow before returning to Murmansk, where Lyoha returns to work without saying goodbye. The taxi driver passes Laura a note from him, which is a crude drawing of her face with the words “Haista vittu” on the back.

== Cast ==
- Seidi Haarla as Laura
- Yura Borisov as Lyokha
- Dinara Drukarova as Irina
- Yuliya Aug as Natalia
- Lidia Kostina as elderly woman
- Tomi Alatalo as Sasha

== Release ==
During the 2021 Cannes Film Festival, Sony Pictures Classics bought the distribution rights to the film for North America, Latin America, Southeast Asia, the Middle East and Eastern Europe, excluding co-production country Russia, where the film was distributed by the local branch of the sister company, Sony Pictures Releasing, marking the company's second acquisition of a Finnish film following Aki Kaurismäki's The Man Without a Past in 2002.

== Reception ==
=== Critical response ===
On the review aggregator website Rotten Tomatoes, 93% of 120 critics' reviews are positive. The website's consensus reads: "Compartment No. 6 can get a little stuffy within its narrative confines, but this well-acted, subtly told love story rewards the viewer's patience." Metacritic, which uses a weighted average, assigned the film a score of 80 out of 100, based on 33 critics, indicating "generally favorable" reviews.

=== Accolades ===
Award	Date of ceremony	Category	Recipient(s)	Result	Ref.
Cannes Film Festival	17 July 2021	Palme d'Or	Juho Kuosmanen	Nominated	
Cannes Film Festival	17 July 2021	Grand Prix	Juho Kuosmanen	Won	
Cannes Film Festival	17 July 2021	Queer Palm	Juho Kuosmanen	Nominated	
Cannes Film Festival	17 July 2021	Prize of the Ecumenical Jury – Special Mention	Juho Kuosmanen	Won	
British Independent Film Awards	December 5, 2021	Best International Independent Film	Juho Kuosmanen, Livia Ulvan, Andris Feldmanis, Jussi Rantamäki, Emilia Hakka	Nominated	
European Film Awards	11 December 2021	Best Film	Compartment No. 6	Nominated	
European Film Awards	11 December 2021	Best Actor	Yura Borisov	Nominated	
European Film Awards	11 December 2021	Best Actress	Seidi Haarla	Nominated	
Satellite Awards	2 April 2022	Best Foreign Language Film	Compartment No. 6	Nominated	
Golden Globe Awards	9 January 2022	Best Foreign Language Film	Compartment No. 6	Nominated	
Independent Spirit Awards	6 March 2022	Best International Film	Compartment No. 6	Nominated	

== See also ==
- List of submissions to the 94th Academy Awards for Best International Feature Film
- List of Finnish submissions for the Academy Award for Best International Feature Film
