= Helena Salonius =

Finnish actress and opera singer

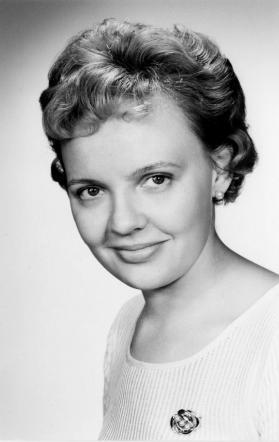
- Helena Salonius pictured in the 1950s
- Born: 17 March 1930; Helsinki, Finland
- Died: 24 September 2012 (aged 82); Helsinki, Finland
- Spouse: Saulo Haarla
- Family: Teuri Haarla (son); Iro Haarla (daughter)

Helena Salonius (17 March 1930 — 24 September 2012) was a Finnish operatic soprano and actress.

== Early life and education ==
Salonius was born into a musical family: her mother was the singer Helmi Frilander-Salonius, a close friend of the opera diva Aino Ackté, while her aunt was the opera singer Elsa Frilander. She never knew her father, who died only months after her birth.

She went to school at Helsingin Suomalainen Yhteiskoulu, which has a strong tradition of artistic and cultural education, and this is likely to have influenced her career choice. After graduation, she continued in 1950 to drama school (now part of Helsinki Theatre Academy).

Salonius married the actor Saulo Haarla, whom she had met at drama school, and together they had two children: their son Teuri Haarla (born 1955) became an artist, and their daughter, Iro Haarla (born 1956), a jazz musician.

== Career ==
After working for some years as a stage and film actor, appearing in three feature-length films in the 1950s, Salonius turned her hand in the early 1960s to singing, encouraged by the conductor Jorma Panula. She trained in Finland under Aulikki Rautawaara, as well as making study trips to Austria and Italy.

Salonius is notable for having performed over three decades from the early 1960s to the early 1990s, singing a remarkably wide variety of roles, both dramatic and comic. She was known for her meticulous research into and preparation of her roles.
