= Juho Kuosmanen =

Finnish film director and screenwriter (born 1979)

- Born: September 30, 1979 (age 47); Kokkola, Central Ostrobothnia, Finland
- Occupations: Filmmaker, actor

Juho Kuosmanen (born September 30, 1979) is a Finnish filmmaker. Most known for his films The Happiest Day in the Life of Olli Mäki (2016) and Compartment No. 6 (2021).

== Early life ==
He graduated from Aalto University School of Arts, Design and Architecture in 2014. Kuosmanen's graduation film called The Painting Sellers was nominated for five Finnish film Academy Awards. (set design, screenplay, best actress, best director, best film). The Painting Sellers won the first prize in Cinéfondation in the 2010 Cannes Film Festival.

Kuosmanen acted in Leea Klemola's arctic trilogy, performing in "Kokkola" and "New Karleby", both staged at Tampere Theatre in Tampere, Finland. He has also directed opera with conductors Sakari Oramo and Santtu-Matias Rouvali.

== Career ==
His debut feature The Happiest Day in the Life of Olli Mäki (2016) had its world premiere at the Un Certain Regard section of the 69th Cannes Film Festival, where it won the section's top prize. The project had been developed through the TorinoFilmLab Script&Pitch programme in 2014. The movie also won the Grand Prix of the Saint-Jean-de-Luz International Film Festival. It was selected as the Finnish entry for the Best Foreign Language Film at the 89th Academy Awards, but it was not nominated.

His second feature film Compartment No. 6 (2021), had its world premiere at the main competition of the 74th Cannes Film Festival, where it won the Grand Prix (the festival's second prize) alongside Asghar Farhadi's A Hero. It was selected as the Finnish submission for the Best International Feature Film at the 94th Academy Awards, it was one of the 15 shortlisted films in the category but was not nominated.

His upcoming series Yours, Margot won development prize at 2023 Series Mania Seriesmakers section.

Since 2025, Kuosmanen is also a part-time cinema professor at Aalto University School of Arts, Design and Architecture.

=== Upcoming projects ===
His third feature film A Real Dreamer (En Ægte Drømmer), and his Danish language debut was announced in June 2026. Starring Magnus Millang, Paprika Steen, Ellen Kihri, and Ragnhild Kaasgaard, shooting took place during the summer, with an expected 2027 release date in Denmark.

== Filmography ==
=== Feature films ===
Year	English Title	Original Title	Notes
2016	The Happiest Day in the Life of Olli Mäki	Hymyilevä mies	
2021	Compartment No. 6	Hytti nro 6	
TBA	A Real Dreamer	En Ægte Drømmer	Post-production

=== Television ===
- Alice & Jack (TV series, 2024)
- Yours, Margot (TV series, in production)
