= The Boy Mir =

The Boy Mir پسری به نام میر
- Directed by: Phil Grabsky
- Starring: Mir and his family
- Edited by: Phil Reynolds
- Release date: 2 February 2011 (Santa Barbara Film Festival)
- Running time: 90 minutes
- Countries: United Kingdom; Afghanistan
- Languages: Dari (Hazaragi dialect); English

The Boy Mir is documentary film about ten years life of a Hazara boy in Afghanistan. This film was made after an international hit film The Boy who Plays on the Buddhas of Bamiyan by a British film maker Phil Grabsky.

== Synopsis ==
The Boy Mir reveals this day-to-day life of Mir and his family from a very close-up perspective. The narrative is driven by Mir's journey into his early teens, when he will be expected to put his childish ways behind him and begin the difficult process of becoming a man. This is hard enough for any child, but Mir has to face this challenge in modern Afghanistan. In sum, this is a unique portrayal of life, full of humour, full of poignancy, in today's Afghanistan.

The film tracks the life ten years life of Mir, from a naive 9-year-old to fully grown adult in one of the toughest places on earth Afghanistan. The film begins in the year 2002, just after the fall of Taliban when Mir, at that time, was living in a cave by the recently destroyed Buddhas of Bamyan. After a year in Bamyan, Mir's family moves back to their home in a small and remote village up north. The film covers the day-to-day lives of Mir and his family.

As days pass, Mir changes, like any boy growing up. He starts understanding the world and thus a little less happy. He begins real life by working hard at the village school and intends to become a teacher. After school, he gives a hand to family members and grows wheat in the mountains. He and his father always talk about how good should he be doing in school and how much time should he spend working. As the only son of an ailing father, it becomes clear that there is increasing call for the young boy to help support what is an extremely poor family.

As the film progresses, Mir turns his attention, however, from horses and donkeys and helping the family to bikes, motorbikes and having fun. His ambition to one day be a teacher or indeed president of Afghanistan changes; now he simply hopes not be killed in the fighting.

The film also shows how is the new Afghanistan changes after the fall of Taliban.

It was pitched at the 2007 Sheffield Doc/Fest MeetMarket prior to completion.

== Cast ==
All appearing as themselves

- Mir
- Abdul (Mir's father)
- Fatima (Mir's mother)
- Khoshdel (Mir's brother)
- Gul Afrooz (Mir's sister)

== Awards ==
- Winner of Best Documentary Santa Barbara 2011
- Winner of Audience Award Washington, D.C. 2011
- Winner of Best Documentary (premio Grazia Deledda) Sardinia International Ethnographic Film Festival, Nuoro, 2012
