= 60th Maharashtra State Film Awards =

Award ceremony for Indian films of 2022

- Awarded for: Best of Marathi cinema in 2022
- Awarded by: Government of Maharashtra
- Announced on: 5 August 2025
- Site: NSCI Dome, Worli, Mumbai
- Hosted by: Prasad Oak and Amruta Subhash
- Official website: www.filmcitymumbai.org

Highlights
- Best Feature Film: Dharmaveer
- Most awards: Dharmaveer (6)
- Most nominations: Dharmaveer (8)

The 60th Maharashtra State Film Awards, presented by the Government of Maharashtra celebrated excellence in Marathi cinema by honoring the best films released in 2022.

The nominations for the awards were announced on 28 January 2025 by the Minister of Cultural Affairs, Ashish Shelar, along with winners in the technical and child artist categories The award ceremony took place on 5 August 2025.

The Maharashtra Film, Theatre and Cultural Development Corporation had invited submissions for the awards, with the original deadline set for 16 April 2024 but later extending it to 31 May 2024. In total, 50 entries certified by the Central Board of Film Certification (CBFC) released between 1 January and 31 December 2022, were submitted for the preliminary round of evaluation. Originally, the ceremony was scheduled to take place on 24 April 2025, but it was postponed due to the Pahalgam attack that occurred two days earlier.

Dharmaveer led the nominations with eight, followed by Sunny with 7. Ananya with 6 and 4 Blind Men received 5 nominations.

Dharmaveer won a 6 awards, including Best Film I, Best Director I (for Pravin Tarde) and Best Actor (for Prasad Oak), thus becoming the most-awarded film at the ceremony.

== Jury members ==
• Mugdha Godbole	• Vivek Lagoo
• Babasaheb Saudagar	• Vijay Bhope
• Shrirang Aras	• Raja Phadtare
• Sharad Sawant	• Megha Ghadge
• Chaitrali Dongre	• Vinod Ganatra
• Sharvani Pillai	• Zafar Sultan
• Prakash Jadhav	• Devdutt Raut
• Vidyasagar Adhyapak

== Awards and nominations ==
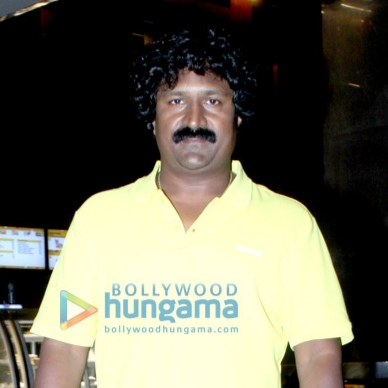
Pravin Tarde, Best Director I

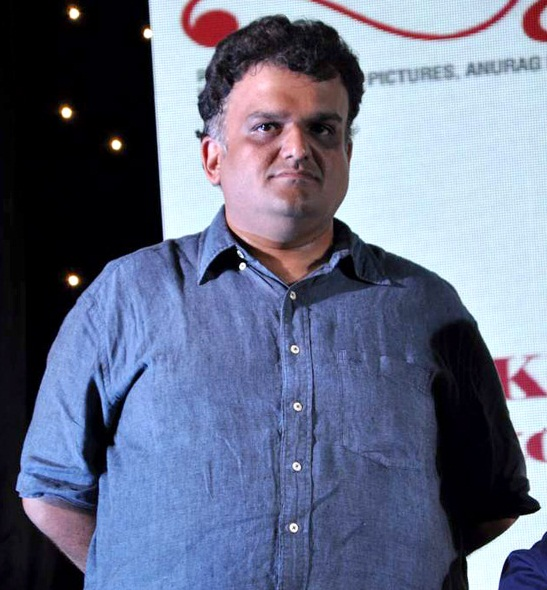
Sachin Kundalkar, Best Director II

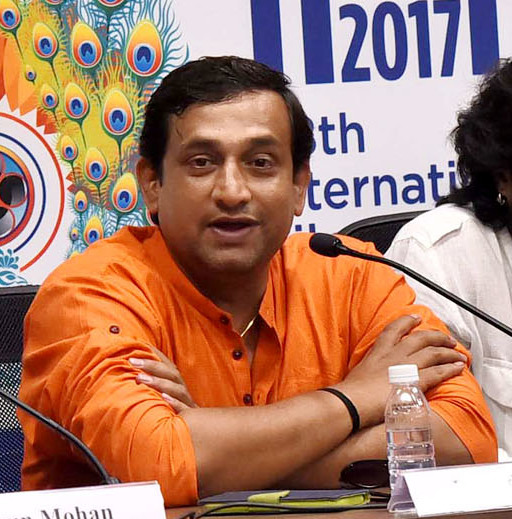
Prasad Oak, Best Actor

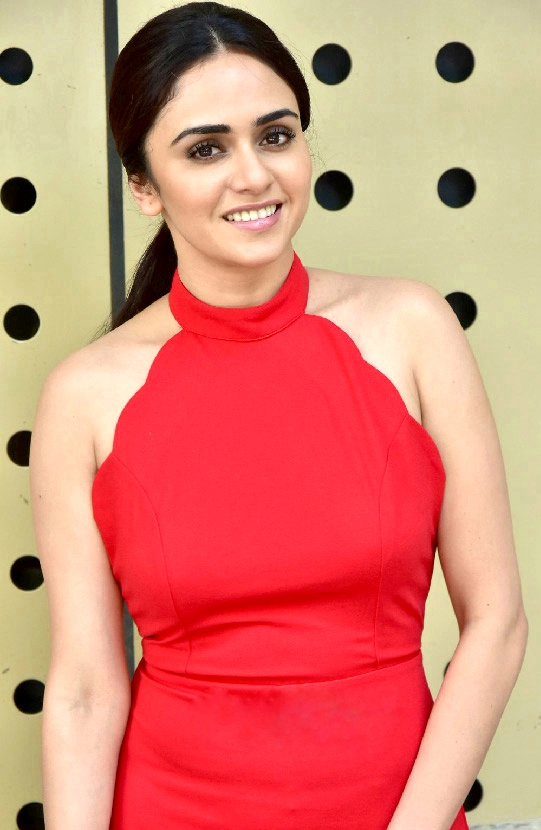
Amruta Khanvilkar, Best Actress

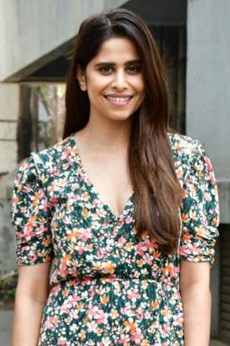
Sai Tamhankar, Best Actress

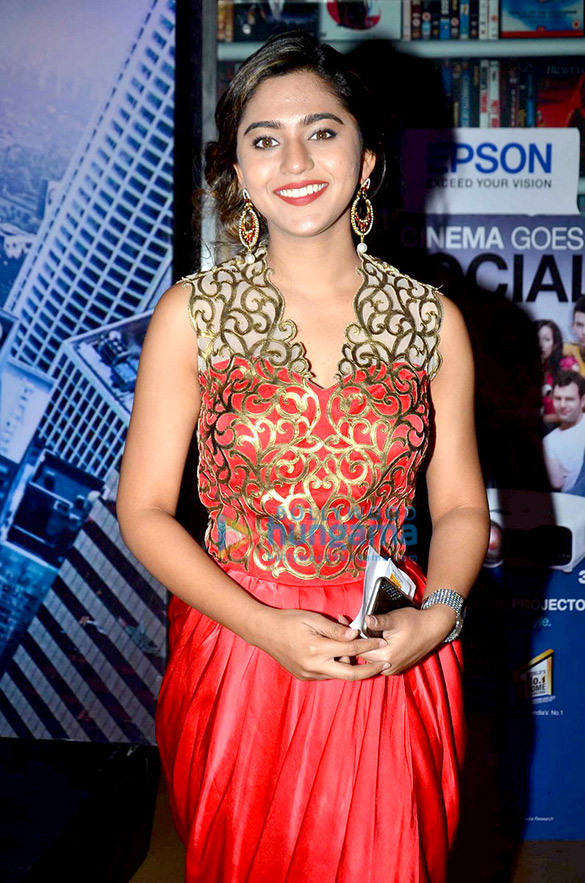
Mrunmayee Deshpande, Best Supporting Actress

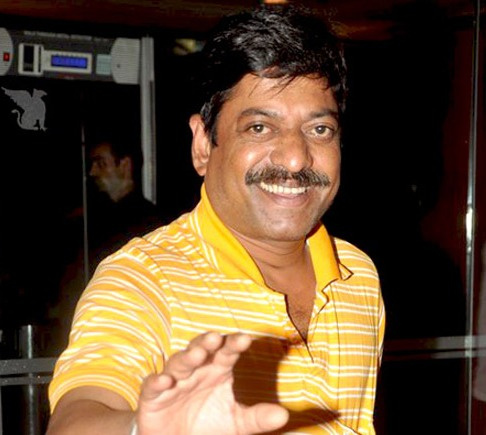
Sanjay Narvekar, Best Comedian Male

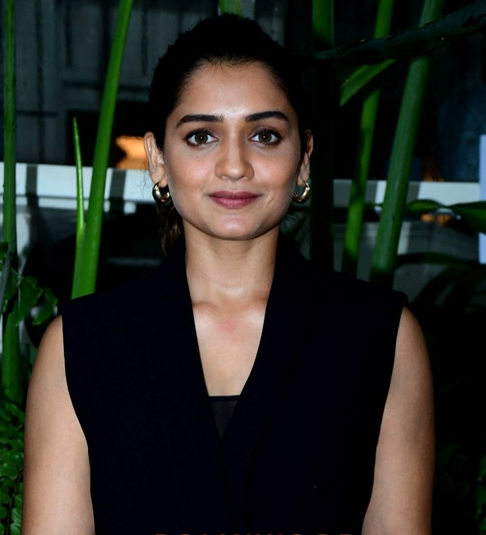
Hruta Durgule, Best Debut Actress

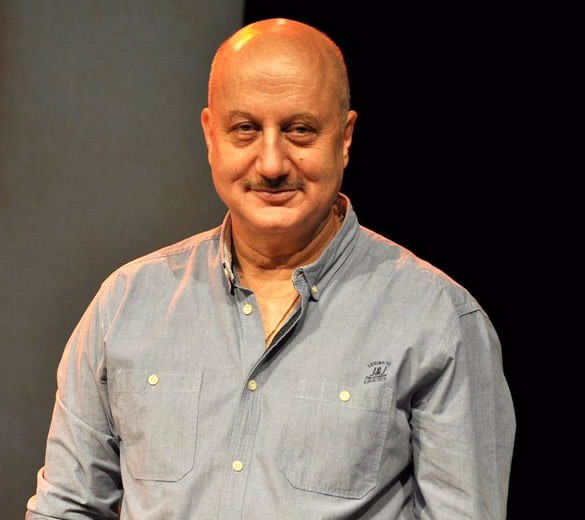
Anupam Kher, Raj Kapoor Award

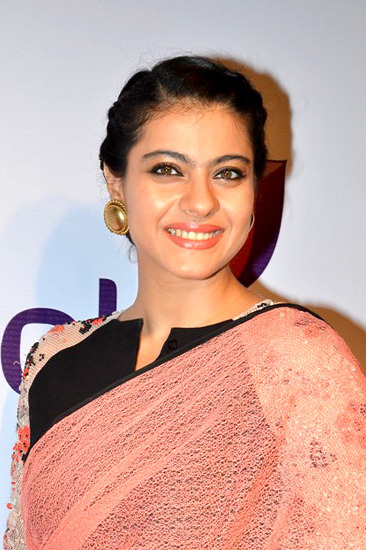
Kajol, Raj Kapoor Special Contribution Award

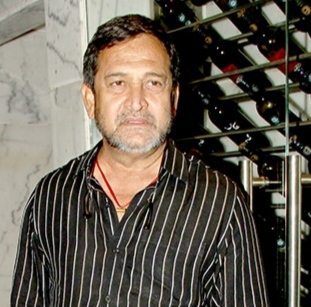
Mahesh Manjrekar, V. Shantaram Lifetime Achievement Award

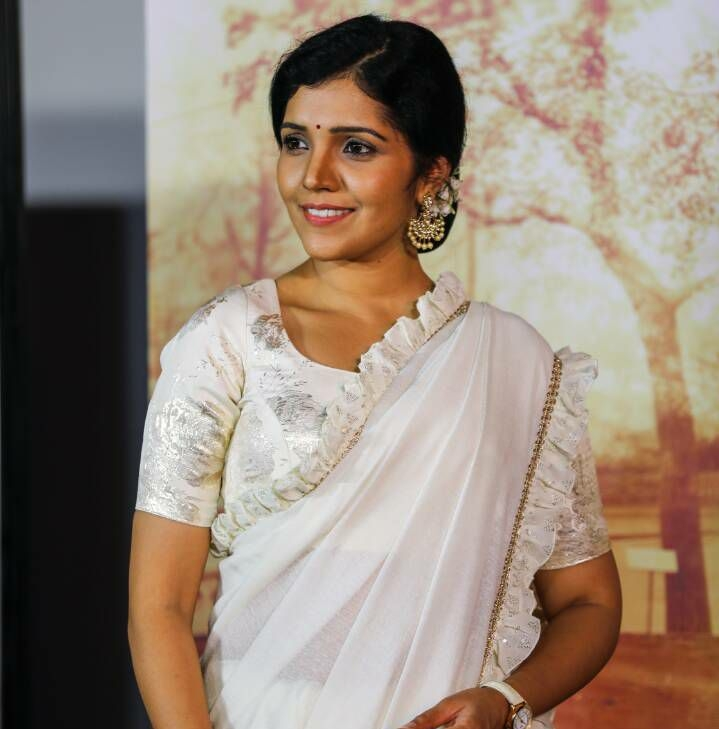
Mukta Barve, V. Shantaram Special Contribution Award

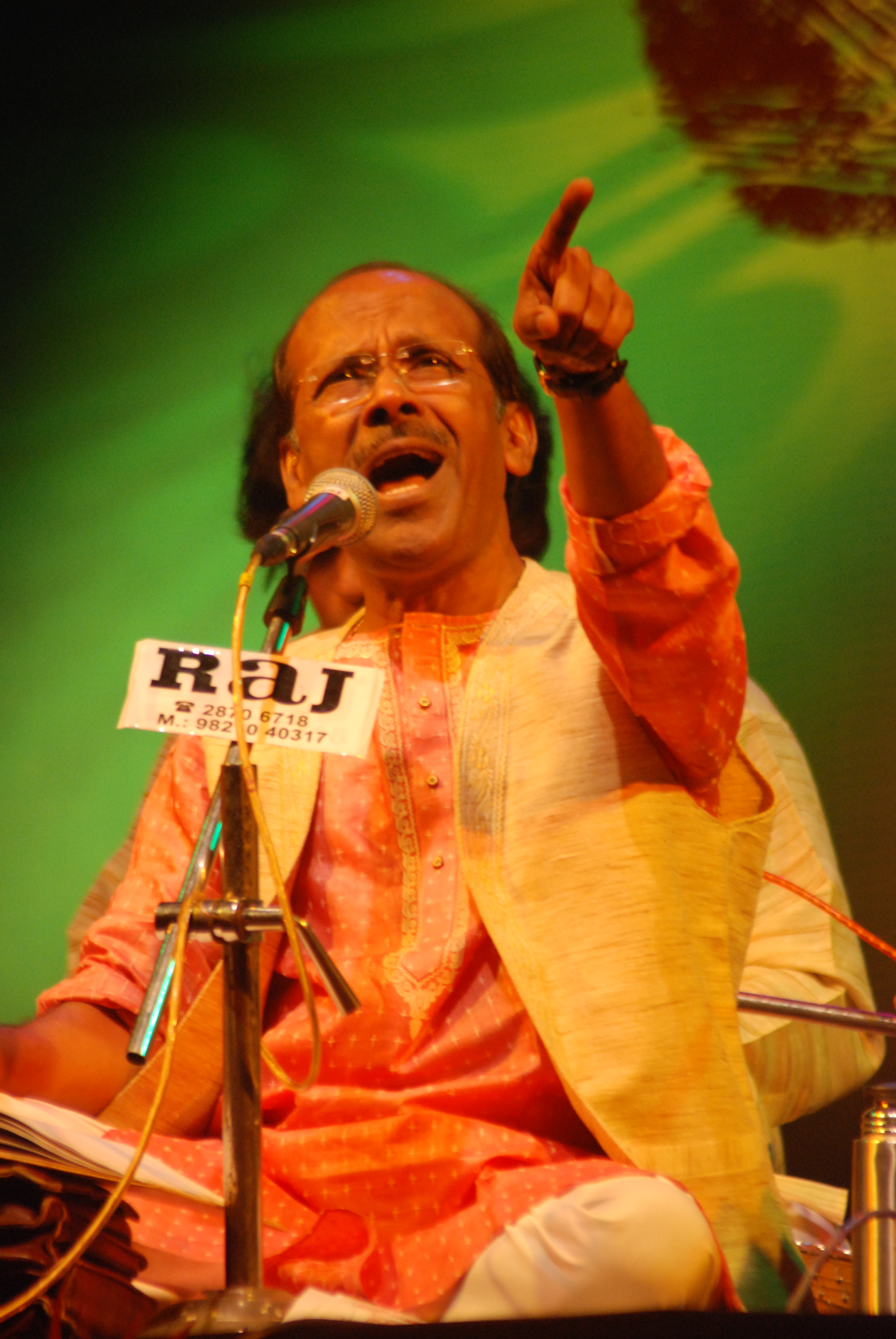
Bhimrao Panchale, Lata Mangeshkar Award

=== Film and director awards ===
Best Film I	Best Director I
Dharmaveer	Pravin Tarde – Dharmaveer
Best Film II	Best Director II
Pondicherry	Sachin Kundalkar – Pondicherry
Best Film III	Best Director III
Har Har Mahadev	Abhijeet Deshpande – Har Har Mahadev
Best Rural Film	Best Rural Film Director
Gaabh	Anup Jatratkar – Gaabh
Best Social Film	Best Social Film Director
Samaira; 4 Blind Men; Global Aadgaon; Har Har Mahadev; Dharmaveer; Hya Goshtila Navach Nahi; Pondicherry; Ananya; Sunny; Gaabh	Rishi Deshpande – Samaira; Pratap Phad – Ananya; Sachin Kundalkar – Pondicherry; Hemant Dhome – Sunny; Pravin Tarde – Dharmaveer; Abhishek Merurkar – 4 Blind Men; Anup Jatratkar – Gaabh; Sandeep Sawant – Hya Goshtila Navach Nahi; Anilkumar Salve – Global Aadgaon; Abhijeet Deshpande – Har Har Mahadev

=== Acting awards ===
Best Actor (Shahu Modak and Sivaji Ganesan Award)	Best Actress (Smita Patil Award)
Prasad Oak – Dharmaveer as Anand Dighe; Vaibhav Tatwawadi – Pondicherry as Rohan; Lalit Prabhakar – Sunny as Sunny	Amruta Khanvilkar – Chandramukhi as Chandramukhi (Chandra) Umajirao Junnarkar; Sai Tamhankar – Pondicherry as Nikita; Sonalee Kulkarni – Tamasha Live as Shefali
Best Supporting Actor (Chintamanrao Kolhatkar Award)	Best Supporting Actress (Shanta Hublikar and Hansa Wadkar Award)
Yogesh Soman – Ananya as Avinash Deshmukh; Kishor Kadam – Territory; Subodh Bhave – Har Har Mahadev as Chhatrapati Shivaji Maharaj	Mrunmayee Deshpande – Chandramukhi as Damayanti (Dolly) Daulatrao Deshmane; Snehal Tarde – Dharmaveer as Anita Birje; Kshitee Jog – Sunny as Vaidehi
Best Child Artist (Gajanan Jagirdar Award)	Best Comedian Male (Damuanna Malvankar Award)
Srinivas Pokale – Chhumantar; Arnav Deshpande – Aamhi Butterfly	Sanjay Narvekar – Timepass 3 as Dinkar Patil; Makarand Anaspure – Varhadi Vajantri; Bharat Ganeshpure – Pillu Bachelor

=== Debut awards ===
Best Debut Film Production	Best Debut Direction
Aatur; Gulhar; Hya Goshtila Navach Nahi	Pratap Phad – Ananya; Abhishek Merurkar – 4 Blind Men; Anup Jatratkar – Gaabh
Best Debut Actor (Kashinath Ghanekar Award)	Best Debut Actress (Ranjana Deshmukh Award)
Jaydeep Kodolikar – Hya Goshtila Navach Nahi; Akur Rathi – Samaira; Ronak Landge – Global Aadgaon	Hruta Durgule – Ananya as Ananya Deshmukh; Sayali Bandkar – Gaabh as Fulwa; Mansi Bhawalkar – Soyrik

=== Music awards ===
Best Playback Singer Male	Best Playback Singer Female
Manish Rajgire – Dharmaveer for "Bhetla Vitthal Majha"; Padmanabh Gaikwad – Gulhar for "Ka Re Jeev Jala"; Ajay Gogavale – Chandramukhi for "Ghe Tujhyat Saavalit Kanha"	Aarya Ambekar – Chandramukhi for "Bai Ga"; Amita Ghugari – Soyarik for "Tula Kay Sangu Kaina"; Juilee Jogalekar – Samaira for "Sundar Te Dhyan"
Best Song	Best Background Music
Abhishek Khankar – Ananya for "Dhaga Aad Ya"; Prashant Madpuwar – Global Aadgaon for "Yalgar Hovu De"; Prakash Chavan – Fatwa for "Alagad Maan He"	Honey Satmakar – Aatur; Avinash–Vishwajeet – Dharmaveer; Aditya Bedekar – Sunny
Best Music Director (Arun Paudwal Award)	Best Choreographer
Nihar Shembekar – Samaira; Hitesh Modak – Har Har Mahadev; Vijay Gawande – Songya	Umesh Jadhav – Dharmaveer for "Aai Jagdambe"; Rahul Thombre, Sanjeev Hovaladar – Timepass 3 for "Colddrink Watte Gaar", "Waghachi Darkaali"; Sujit Kumar – Sunny for "Mee Nachnar Bhai"

=== Writing awards ===
Best Story (Madhusudan Kalelkar Award)	Best Screenplay
Sumit Tambe – Samaira; Anil Salve – Global Aadgaon; Poorval Dhotre, Abhishek Merurkar – 4 Blind Men	Tejas Modak, Sachin Kundalkar – Pondicherry; Irawati Karnik – Sunny; Poorval Dhotre, Abhishek Merurkar – 4 Blind Men
Best Dialogue
Pravin Tarde – Dharmaveer; Makarand Mane – Soyrik; Sachin Mullemwar – Territory

=== Technical awards ===
Best Costume Design	Best Makeup
Saurabh Kapde, Sumedh Jadhav – Taathkana	Ujjwala Singh – Taathkana
Best Cinematography (Pandurang Naik Award)	Best Editing
Abhijeet Chaudhary, Omkar Barve – 4 Blind Men; Priyashanker Ghosh – Hya Goshtila Navach Nahi	Yash Surve – Kata Kirr
Best Sound Mixing	Best Sound Editing
Lochan Pratap Kanvinde – Har Har Mahadev	Suhas Rane – Hya Goshtila Navach Nahi
Best Art Direction (Saheb Mama aka Fateh Lal Award)
Mahesh Kundalkar – Unaad

=== Special awards ===
Raj Kapoor Award
- Anupam Kher
Raj Kapoor Special Contribution Award
- Kajol
V. Shantaram Lifetime Achievement Award
- Mahesh Manjrekar
V. Shantaram Special Contribution Award
- Mukta Barve
Lata Mangeshkar Award
- Bhimrao Panchale
Chhatrapati Shivaji Maharaj Mahavarsha Award
- Vishal Sharma

== Superlatives ==
Multiple wins
Awards	Film
6	Dharmaveer
4	Pondicherry
4	Samaira
4	Ananya
3	Har Har Mahadev
3	Chandramukhi
2	Gaabh
2	Aatur
2	Taathkana
2	Hya Goshtila Navach Nahi
1	Timepass 3
1	4 Blind Men
1	Kata Kirr
