= Ketaki Narayan =

Actress and model

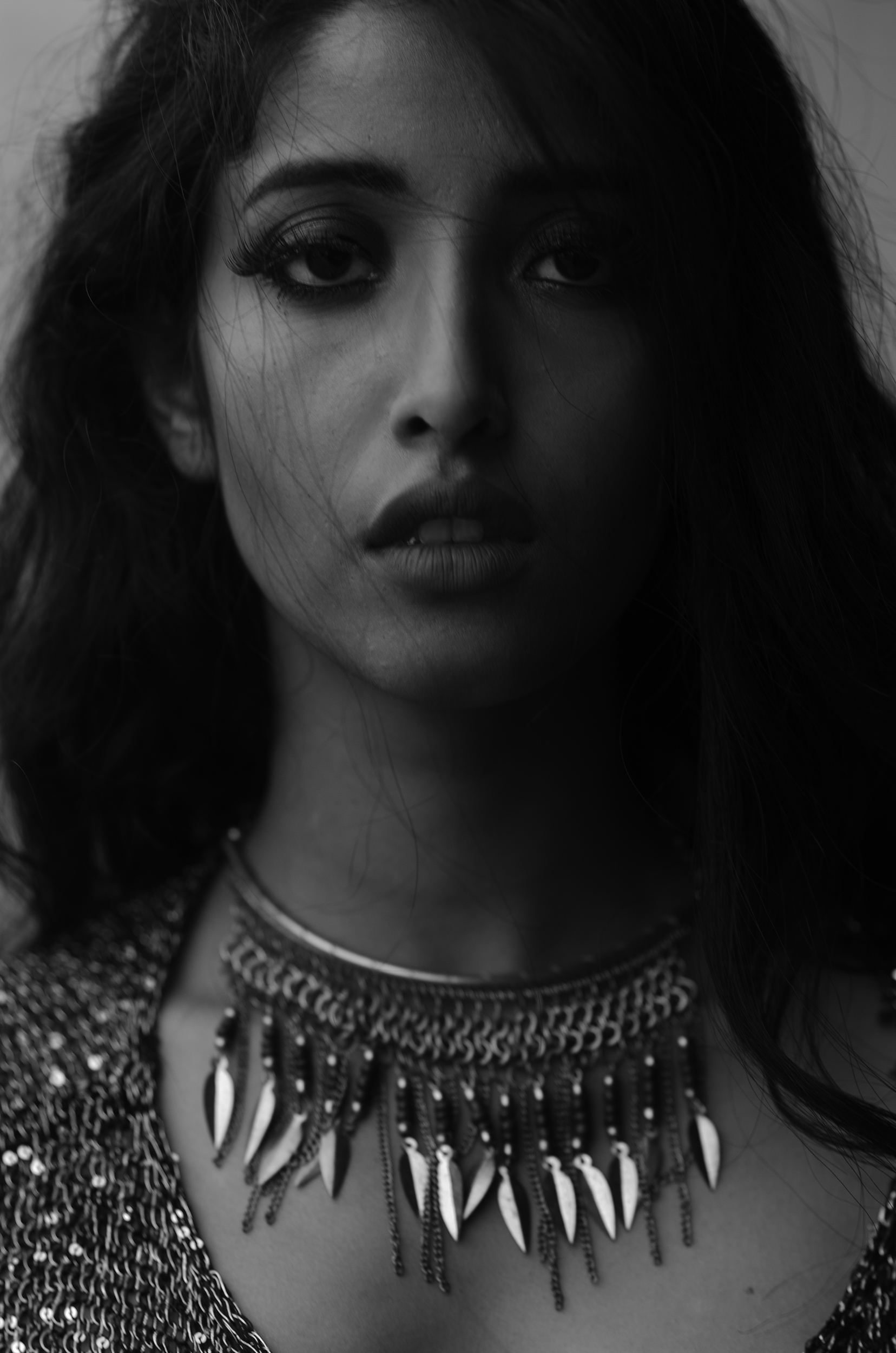
- Born: Akola, Maharashtra, India
- Occupations: Actress; Model
- Years active: 2014–present
- Family: Narayan Kulkarni (father); Udaya Kulkarni (mother)
- Website: Official website

Ketaki Narayan is an Indian actress and model. She appears in Marathi, Malayalam, Telugu and Hindi cinema. She debuted with the Marathi film Youth. She has appeared in several short films and musical albums.

== Early life ==
Ketaki Narayan hails from Akola, Maharashtra. She studied in Bharat Vidyalay, Akola. She completed her graduation in Computers from MIT, Pune. Ketaki worked as a Software Engineer in Cognizant before becoming full time model and actress, She won the Radio Mirchi Queen Bee Miss Talent - 2014. Ketaki appeared on the cover of various magazines including Femina, Vogue, FWD, Creme, Vanitha and New Woman.

== Acting career ==
Ketaki started her career in acting with the Marathi film Youth.

== Filmography ==
Key
†	Denotes films that have not yet been released

=== Feature films ===
Year	Film	Role	Language	Ref.
2016	Youth	Audy	Marathi	
2016	Udaharnarth Nemade	Muse	Marathi	
2017	Veeram	Kunjunooli	Malayalam; Hindi; English	
2018	Diwanjimoola Grand Prix	Peelimole	Malayalam	
2018	Page 4	Namrata	Marathi	
2019	Bodhi	Swati	Marathi	
2019	Under World	Chitra Iyyer	Malayalam	
2019	Jawani Zindabad	Nandini	Marathi	
2019	Nirmal Enroute	Samaira	Marathi	
2019	Respect	Eshawari	Marathi	
2019	Died	Manasi	Marathi	
2019	Girlz	Maggi	Marathi	
2021	FCUK: Father Chitti Umaa Kaarthik	Kalyani	Telugu	
2021	83	Pregnant woman	Hindi	
2022	Prappeda - Hawk's Muffin	Ruby	Malayalam	
2022	Aviyal	Vrinda	Malayalam	
2022	Vichithram	Sanghamithra	Malayalam	
2022	Samaira	Samaira	Marathi	
2023	Kadhikan		Malayalam	
2024	Yatra 2	Y. S. Bharathi	Telugu	
2025	Pune Highway	Mona	Hindi	

=== Music videos ===
Year	Song	Language	Ref.
2018	Kerala Tourism	Malayalam	
2018	Maravairi	Kannada	
2018	Mayathee	Tamil	
2017	Chetti Aa	Hindi	
2017	Thirayayi	Malayalam	
2017	Time in a Bottle - Charlse Bukowski Visual poetry	English	

=== Short films ===
Year	Movie	Role	Language	Ref.
2015	Antahkaran Gatha	Deblina	Hindi	
2017	Out Of Stock	Isha	Hindi	
2017	Burkha Se Bikini Tak	Main Character	Hindi	
2018	Burning	Pritha	Hindi	
2019	The Muse	Muse	Marathi	
2020	Budgie	House Wife	Hindi	

=== Web series ===
Year	Series	Role	Director	Ref.
2019	Laakhon Mein Ek - Season 2	Meera	Abhishek Banerjee	
2020	High Time	Shivani	Shubhendu Lalit	
2022	Pitchers	Rajlaxmi aka Raj	Arunabh Kumar	
2022	Athang	Subhadra	Jayaant Pawar	
