= Rangaa Patangaa =

2016 Marathi language film

Ranga Patanga
- Poster
- Directed by: Prasad Namjoshi
- Written by: Prasad Namjoshi, Chinmay Patankar
- Screenplay by: Prasad Namjoshi
- Story by: Chinmay Patankar
- Produced by: Amol Vasant Gole, Rajesh Dempo, Madhavi Sameer Shetty
- Starring: Makarand Anaspure; Sandeep Pathak; Nandita Patkar; Gauri Konge; Suhas Palshikar; Bharat Ganeshpure
- Cinematography: Amol Gole
- Edited by: Sagar Vanjari
- Music by: Kaushal Inamdar
- Production companies: Flying God Films, Vishwas Media and Entertainment
- Release date: 1 April 2016
- Running time: 121 minutes
- Country: India
- Language: Marathi

Rangaa Patangaa (Marathi: रंगा पतंगा) is an Indian Marathi-language film released in 2016. The film stars Makarand Anaspure and Sandeep Pathak in the lead role, while Nandita Patkar, Gauri Konge, Bharat Ganeshpure reprises the supporting cast.

== Plot ==
Jumman beloved oxen ranga is stolen from his home so he and his friend start searching him

== Cast ==
- Makarand Anaspure as Jumman
- Sandeep Pathak as Popat
- Hardeek Joshi as ACP Pathak
- Nandita Patkar as Noor
- Bharat Ganeshpure
- Suhas Palshikar
- Gauri Konge
- Abhay Mahajan
- Anand Kekan

== Soundtrack ==
The film features two songs, both composed by Kaushal Inamdar and sung by Adarsh Shinde. The lyrics of the songs have been written by Ilahi Jamdar.

No.	Title	Lyrics	Music	Singer(s)	Length
1.	"Aye Sanam (Qawali)"	Ilahi Jamadar	Kaushal Inamdar	Adarsha Shinde	4:08
2.	"Aye Sanam (Gazal)"	Ilahi Jamadar	Kaushal Inamdar	Adarsha Shinde	6:24
Total length:					10:32

== Awards ==
The film won several awards in many international film festivals, including Best Film and Best Director in the Pune International Films festival in 2016.
