= List of Indian films with the highest digital rights =

This page lists some of the Indian films with the highest digital rights value, focusing on films that have achieved notable success in theatres before making their debut on streaming platforms. The leading OTT services in India include Netflix, Amazon Prime Video, and Disney+ Hotstar.

== Overview ==
With the rapid growth of the digital content market, post-pandemic Indian films have secured substantial deals for their digital distribution, often surpassing traditional revenue streams. This trend highlights the increasing influence of streaming platforms in Indian cinema. The Indian streaming market has experienced remarkable expansion, with projections indicating it will reach $5 billion by the end of 2024. This growth is fueled by the rise of digital platforms and a surge in subscriptions. Currently, the OTT audience in India stands at 547 million users, reflecting a 14% increase from 2023’s 481 million, representing a 38% market penetration.

Only films released post-pandemic have been considered, as the surge in digital platforms began during the lockdown. Some films have been distributed to multiple platforms to appeal to wider audiences as per language aiming to diversify their audience reach. Currently, Kalki 2898 AD holds the highest sold digital rights, divided between two platforms Netflix and Amazon Prime Video at ₹375 crores.

== Highest digital deals ==
The following table lists the highest digital rights deals for Indian films value at ₹100 crore or more.

Rank	Title	OTT Platform	Digital Rights	Language	Year	Ref.
1	Kalki 2898 AD	Amazon Prime Video / Netflix	₹375 crore	Telugu	2024	
2	RRR	ZEE5 / Netflix / Disney+ Hotstar	₹325 crore (Note: RRR's digital and satellite rights combined is 325 crore.)	Telugu	2022	
3	KGF: Chapter 2	Amazon Prime Video	₹320 crore	Kannada	2022	
4	Pushpa 2: The Rule	Netflix	₹275 crore	Telugu	2024	
5	Adipurush	Netflix / Amazon Prime Video	₹200 crore	Hindi; Telugu	2023	
6	Salaar: Part 1 – Ceasefire	Netflix / Disney+ Hotstar	₹160–162 crore	Telugu	2023	
7	Devara: Part 1	Netflix	₹150–155 crore	Telugu	2024	
8	Dhurandhar: The Revenge	Jio Hotstar	₹150 crore	Hindi	2026	
9	Singham Again	Amazon Prime Video	₹130 crore	Hindi	2024	
10	Kantara: Chapter 1	Amazon Prime Video	₹125 crore	Kannada	2025	
12	Leo	Netflix	₹120 crore	Tamil	2023	
13	Coolie	Amazon Prime Video	₹120 crore	Tamil	2025	
14	Jawan	Netflix	₹120 crore	Hindi	2023	
15	Thug Life	Netflix	₹110 crore	Tamil	2025	
16	The Greatest of All Time	Netflix	₹110 crore	Tamil	2024	
17	Game Changer	Amazon Prime Video / ZEE5	₹105 crore	Telugu	2025	
18	Pathaan	Amazon Prime Video	₹100 crore	Hindi	2023	

== See also ==
- List of most expensive Indian films
- List of highest-grossing Indian films
