= Kadhikan =

2023 Indian Malayalam drama film

- Directed by: Jayaraj
- Produced by: Jayaraj; Manoj Govindan
- Starring: Mukesh; Ketaki Narayan; Gopu Krishna
- Cinematography: Shaji Kumar
- Edited by: Vipin Vishwakarma
- Music by: Sanjoy Chowdhury
- Production company: Wide Screen Media Production
- Release date: 8 December 2023
- Running time: 92 minutes
- Country: India
- Language: Malayalam

Kadhikan is a 2023 Indian Malayalam drama film directed by filmmaker Jayaraj. The film stars Mukesh in the lead role, with Ketaki Narayan and Gopu Krishna in supporting roles. Sanjoy Chowdhury composed the music for the film, which won the National Film Award – Special Mention.

== Plot ==
A renowned story teller during the 1980s currently earning a living at the sawmill, hiding the performer in him due to his dire circumstances. A 17-year-old boy living in a juvenile home wishes to learn story telling from him with the support of the superintendent. His desire to learn the art form reignites the story teller's faith in the same. Over a short span of time, the relationship between the Kadhikan and the young boy becomes a bond unlike any other, unfolding new dimensions in both their lives.

== Cast ==
- Mukesh as Chandrasenan / Kadhikan
- Unni Mukundan as the superintendent of the juvenile home (Cameo appearance)
- Ketaki Narayan
- Krishnanand
- Gopu Krishna
- Sabitha Jayaraj
- Manoj Govindan

== Production ==
In September 2022, Unni Mukundan reported that he was working on this film alongside two other unreleased Jayaraj films: Pramadhavanam and Mehfil.

== Soundtrack ==
The music was composed by Sanjoy Chowdhury.

Song	Singer	Lyrics	Notes
"Jeevathahu"	Anthara Salil Chowdhury	Tharun Kumar Sinha (Malayalam)	Contains Bengali lyrics
"Aadhyanuraagam Nee"	Vijay Yesudas	Vayalar Sarathchandra Varma	

== Reception ==
A critic from The Hindu wrote that "Despite noble intentions to shed light on a dying art form, the Jayaraj film misses the mark when it comes to having an intriguing plot".
