= Pune Highway =

2024 Indian Hindi-language thriller film

- Theatrical release poster
- Directed by: Bugs Bhargava Krishna; Rahul da Cunha
- Produced by: Rahul da Cunha; Seema Mohapatra; Jahanara Bhargava
- Starring: Amit Sadh; Jim Sarbh; Anuvab Pal; Manjari Fadnis; Ketaki Narayan; Sudeep Modak
- Cinematography: Deep Metkar
- Edited by: Abhishek Gupta
- Music by: Shor Police
- Production companies: Drop D Films; Ten Years Younger Productions
- Distributed by: Zee Studios; Cinépolis India
- Release dates: November 2024 (IFFI); 23 May 2025 (India)
- Running time: 126 minutes
- Country: India
- Language: Hindi

Pune Highway is a 2024 Indian Hindi-language thriller film directed by Bugs Bhargava Krishna and Rahul da Cunha, and produced by Rahul da Cunha and Seema Mohapatra. The film stars Amit Sadh, Jim Sarbh, Anuvab Pal, Manjari Fadnis, Ketaki Narayan,Kurangi Vijayshrie Nagraj and Sudeep Modak. It premiered at the 55th IFFI 2024, and was theatrically released in India on 23 May 2025. It began streaming on Amazon Prime Video from 4 July 2025.

== Plot ==
Pune Highway is described as a chilling tale of friendship and a mysterious murder. The story revolves around a dead body and the secrets that unravel, creating a suspenseful narrative. The trailer highlights themes of friendship gone wrong and a gripping murder mystery.

== Cast ==
- Amit Sadh as Pramod Khandelwal, Khandu, Mona Mansekar's guardian
- Manjari Fadnis as Natasha Khandelwal, Natsu, and Pramod's sister
- Jim Sarbh as Vishnu Shegal, a lawyer, Pramod and Natasha's childhood friend
- Anuvab Pal as Nicholas Thomas, Nicky, a painter and Pramod's childhood friend
- Shishir Sharma as Madhusudhan Mansekar, Mona Mansekar's father
- Ketaki Narayan as Mona Mansekar
- Rajit Kapoor as Dr. Mahesh
- Sudeep Modak as Inspector Prabhakar Pethe
- Delisha Chutani as Pethe's daughter
- Swapnil Ajagaonkar as Sub-Inspector Godbole
- Deepali Garg as Seema
- Dilshad Bhargava as Sister Mary Ann
- Trisha Bhisht as young Natasha
- Aarush Ganesh Bankhele as young Nicky
- Smita Dongre as Miss Saple
- Abhishek Krishnan as Arvind Saple Jr., Mona's fiancé
- Kalpana Ajaney as Vishnu's grandmother
- Himanshu Balpande as Babu Bhosle

== Production ==
The film is directed by Bugs Bhargava Krishna and Rahul da Cunha, with production handled by Rahul da Cunha and Seema Mohapatra under Drop D Films and Ten Years Younger Productions. Shooting began in November 2022, as announced by Amit Sadh, who described the project as a transition from an award-winning play to a drama-thriller screenplay. The filming was completed by January 2023, with Amit Sadh sharing a picture from the sets alongside co-star Jim Sarbh. Amit Sadh has compared the film to Kai Po Che!, expressing excitement about its potential impact.

== Release ==
Pune Highway was screened at the 55th International Film Festival of India (IFFI) in Goa in November 2024. The teaser for the film was released on 30 April 2025, followed by the official trailer on 2 May 2025. It was theatrically released in India on 23 May 2025, and began streaming on Amazon Prime Video from 4 July 2025.

== Reception ==
Nandini Ramnath of Scroll.in observe that "Pune Highway isn’t always alive to Nicholas’s troubling ways, or the depiction of Mona as a textbook hussy. The film does a competent job of maintaining suspense over the killer’s identity and motives, but doesn’t create compelling enough characters to make the journey entirely engaging." Devesh Sharma of Filmfare gave 3 stars out of 5 and said that "Ultimately, Pune Highway is a film of conflicting ambitions. It wants to be a nostalgic tale of friendship, a character-driven drama, and a suspenseful murder mystery all at once. While it succeeds in moments, it falters in integrating these elements into a cohesive whole. The result is a film that is compelling in parts but inconsistent in impact."

Dhaval Roy of The Times of India rated 2.5/5 stars and said that "Pune Highway holds tremendous potential in its story arc and character development, it falls short of delivering a truly compelling experience. What could have been a gripping thriller turns into a bumpy ride." Amit Bhatia of ABP News gave 3.5 stars out of 5 and said that "Pune Highway is the kind of thriller Indian cinema needs more of—smart, subtle, and soaked in suspense. It respects the intelligence of its audience and rewards their attention with a genuinely engrossing experience. Sadly, without a massive marketing push or studio backing, it risks becoming another great film that few people see."

Subhash K Jha writes for News 24 awarded 3 stars out of 5 and commented that "Pune Highway doesn’t offer neat closures to the quirky conundrum of boundary-less relationships among friends who don’t seem to believe in giving one another space. They discuss their scatological and sex lives in the same breath amidst wild cackles and hisses."
