= Sandeep Pathak (actor) =

Indian Marathi actor

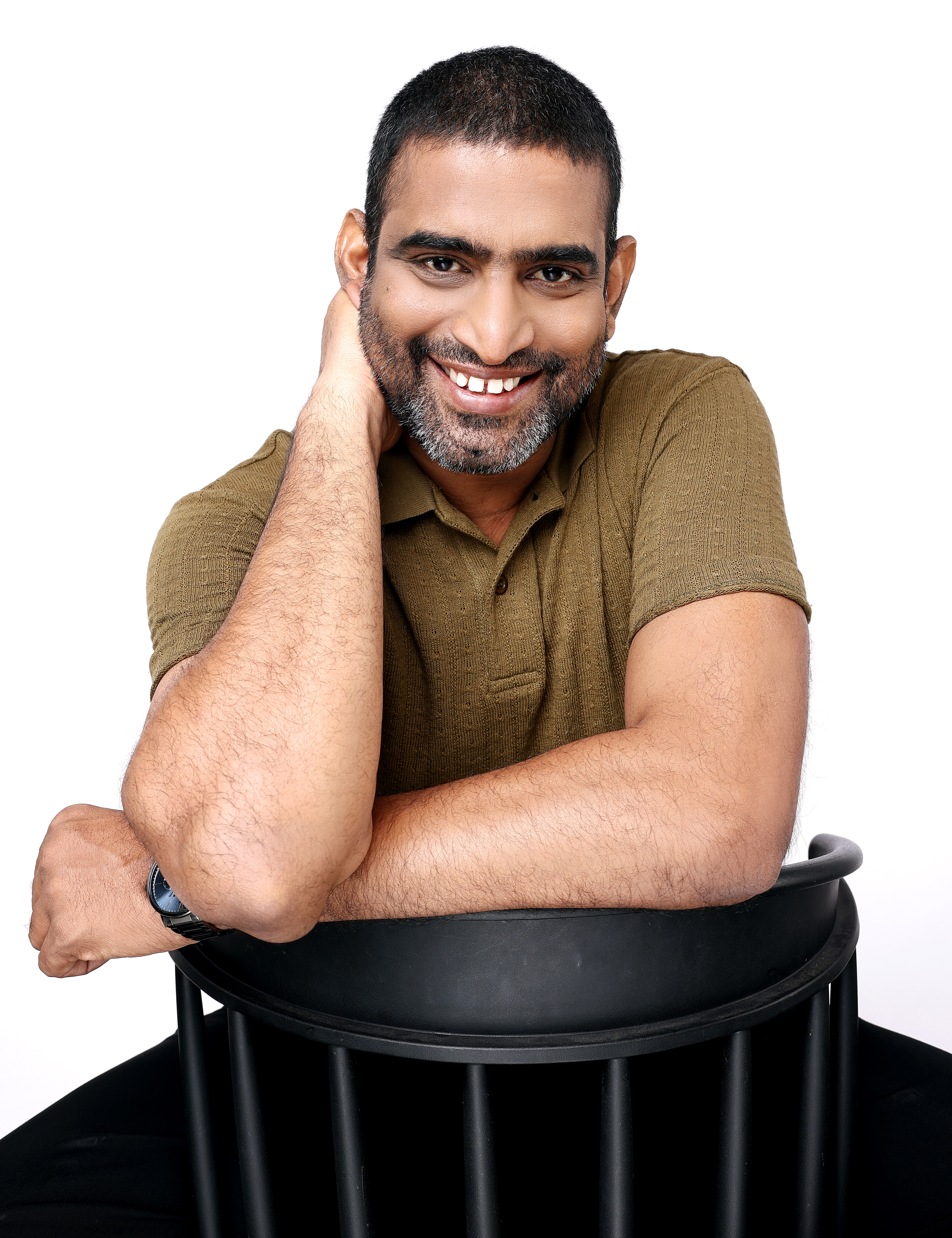
- Born: Sandeep Shyamrao Pathak; 14 May 1978 (age 48); Majalgaon, Maharashtra, India
- Occupation: Actor
- Years active: 2004–Present

Sandeep Pathak (born 14 May 1978) is an Indian film, television and theatre actor in Marathi and Hindi Language. He has featured in television shows such as Asambhav, Eka Lagnachi Dusri Goshta. His notable films are Poshter Girl, Harishchandrachi Factory, Ek Hazarachi Note, Rangaa Patangaa. He is also known for his work in theatre with plays such as Varhad Nighalay Londonla, Sakharam Binder, Asami Asa Mi, Vyakti Aani Valli. He has done many comedies shows like Hasa Chakat Fu, Fu Bai Fu and Comedy Express.

== Personal life ==
He was born in a Deshastha Brahmin family at Majalgaon in Beed district on 14 May 1978. He completed his graduation in Bachelor of Arts (Drama) from SB College, Aurangabad and attained Master of Arts (Drama) from Lalit Kala Kendra at University of Pune. Sandeep married in 2005 with Kalpana Pathak. The couple has two children.

== Career ==
Pathak started his career in Marathi theatre. The stage plays Varhad Nighalay Londonla had him in a lead role. His debut film was Shwaas. Some of his films are Rangaa Patangaa, Double Seat, and Poshter Girl. He Was Nominated at Maharashtra State Film Award for Best Actor for his Film Raakh

== Filmography ==
=== Films ===
Year	Film	Role	Ref(s)
2004	Shwaas		
2008	Ek Daav Dhobi Pachhad		
2009	Harishchandrachi Factory	Trymbak B. Telang	
2009	Gaiir		
2010	Shikshanachya Aaicha Gho		
2011	Shahanpan Dega Deva	Bum Chik Baba	
2011	One Room Kitchen		
2012	Yedyachi Jatra	Vastarya	
2013	Bhutacha Honymoon	Ghost	
2014	Ek Hazarachi Note	Sudama	
2015	Rangaa Patangaa	Popat	
2015	Timepass 2	Malaria	
2015	Deool Band	Vallabh	
2015	Double Seat	Amit's Friend (Traffic Cop)	
2016	Natsamrat		
2016	Poshter Girl	Suresh Patil	
2016	Chidiya	Tapan	
2017	Idak: The Goat	Namya	
2023	Dhishkyaoon		
2023	Vitthal Maza Sobati	Vitthal	
2023	Shyamchi Aai		
2024	Navardev Bsc. Agri		
2024	Terav		
2024	Hoy Maharaja	Rashid Bhai	
2024	Alyad Palyad	Dilya	
2024	Sangharsh Yoddha Manoj Jarange Patil	Janya	
2025	Ek Radha Ek Meera		
2026	Ghabadkund	Dilya	

=== Television ===
- Indrayani (2024)

== Awards ==
- Maharashtra State Award for Best Actor – Ek Hazarachi Note
- Maharashtra State Award for Best Actor – Rangaa Patangaa
- Maharashtra Times Sanman Award for Best Actor – Ek Hazarachi Note
- Baban Prabhu Award – Varhad Nighalay Londonla
