= List of most expensive Indian films =

This ranking lists the most expensive films in Indian cinema, based on conservative production budget estimates reported by organisations classified as green. (Note: See WP:RSP, WP:ICTFSOURCES) The figures are not adjusted for inflation and represent only the actual filming costs, including promotional expenses (such as advertisements, commercials, posters, etc.).

== Most expensive films ==
The following table lists the most expensive films produced in the Indian film industry, each with a budget of ₹300 crore or more.

Most expensive Indian films
Rank	Title	Budget	Language	Year	Ref.
1	Ramayana: Part 1	₹2,000 crore	Hindi	2026	
2	Varanasi	₹1,400 crore	Telugu	2027	
3	Kalki 2898 AD	₹600 crore	Telugu	2024	
4	Toxic	₹500–1000 crore	Hindi; English	2026	(Note: Adipurush's reported budget varies between ₹500 crore (Bollywood Hungama) – ₹700 crore (India Today, News18))
5	Adipurush	₹500–700 crore	Hindi Telugu	2023	
6	RRR	₹550 crore	Telugu	2022	
7	2.0	₹400–600 crore	Tamil	2018	(Note: 2.0's reported budget varies between ₹400 crore (Bollywood Hungama) – ₹500 crore (NDTV) – ₹570 crore (News18) – ₹543 crore (The News Minute, Filmfare, Zee News) – ₹550 crore (India Today, Business Today) – ₹570 crore (DNA India) – ₹600 crore (Cinema Express, The New Indian Express, The Hindu))
8	Pushpa 2: The Rule	₹400–500 crore	Telugu	2024	
9	The RajaSaab	₹400–450 crore	Telugu	2026	(Note: Attributed to multiple references)
10	The Greatest of All Time	₹380–400 crore	Tamil	2024	
11	Brahmāstra: Part One – Shiva	₹375–400 crore	Hindi	2022	
12	Game Changer	₹350–500 crore	Telugu	2025	
13	Coolie	₹350–400 crore	Tamil	2025	
14	Singham Again	₹350–375 crore	Hindi	2024	
15	Bade Miyan Chote Miyan	₹350 crore	Hindi	2024	
15	Saaho	₹350 crore	Telugu; Hindi	2019	
17	Jana Nayagan	₹300–500 crore	Tamil	2026	(Note: Jana Nayagan's reported budget varies between ₹300 crore (The Financial Express) -₹300-500 crore (Free Press Journal) - ₹380 crore (Deccan Chronicle) – ₹400 crore (Cinema Express) – ₹500 crore (India Today, Hindustan Times, Outlook India, and The Economic Times))
18	War 2	₹300–400 crore	Hindi	2025	(Note: War 2's reported budget varies between ₹300–400 crore)
19	Kanguva	₹300–350 crore	Tamil	2024	
19	Peddi	₹300–350 crore	Telugu	2026	(Note: Attributed to multiple sources)

== Most expensive films by language ==
=== Assamese ===
Assamese cinema is a part of Indian cinema, based in Assam, and is dedicated to the production of films in the Assamese language. The following table lists the top most expensive Assamese films produced in the Assamese film industry.

Rank	Title	Budget	Year	Ref
1	Bhaimon Da	₹6 crore	2025	
2	Roi Roi Binale	₹5 crore	2025	

=== Bengali ===
Cinema of West Bengal, also known as Tollywood or Bengali cinema, is a part of Indian cinema. It is based in the Tollygunge region of Kolkata, West Bengal, and is dedicated to the production of films in the Bengali-language. The following table lists the top four most expensive Indian Bengali films.

Rank	Title	Budget	Year	Ref.
1	Amazon Obhijaan	₹20 crore	2017	
2	Chander Pahar	₹15 crore	2013	
3	Professor Shonku O El Dorado	₹10 crore	2019	

=== Bhojpuri ===
Bhojpuri cinema is a part of Indian cinema, dedicated to the production of films in the Bhojpuri-language. Its major production centres are Lucknow and Patna. The following table lists the top most expensive Bhojpuri films produced in the Bhojpuri film industry.

Rank	Title	Budget	Year	Ref.
1	Sangharsh 2	₹6 crore	2023	
2	Nirahua Chalal London	₹4 crore	2019	

=== Gujarati ===
Gujarati cinema is a part of Indian cinema, dedicated to the production of films in the Gujarati-language. It is based in Ahmedabad and is sometimes referred to as Dhollywood. The following table lists the top most expensive Gujarati films produced in the Gujarati film industry.

Rank	Title	Budget	Year
1	Vash Level 2	₹8 crore	2025
2	Vash	₹3–3.5 crore	2023

=== Hindi ===
Hindi cinema is a part of Indian cinema based in Mumbai, Maharashtra. The films are made primarily in the Hindi-language. It is often known as Bollywood and is one of the largest film producers in India as well as a major centre of film production worldwide. The following table lists the top ten most expensive Hindi films produced in the Hindi film industry.

Rank	Title	Budget	Year	Ref.
1	Ramayana: Part 1	₹2,000 crore	2026	
2	Adipurush (Note: The film was produced in both the Hindi and Telugu languages, according to the filmmakers.)	₹500–700 crore	2023	
3	Brahmāstra: Part One – Shiva	₹375–400 crore	2022	
4	Singham Again	₹350–375 crore	2024	
5	Bade Miyan Chote Miyan	₹350 crore	2024	
5	Saaho	₹350 crore	2019	
6	War 2	₹300–400 crore	2025	
7	Jawan	₹300 crore	2023	
7	Tiger 3	₹300 crore	2023	
8	Border 2	₹275 crore	2026	
9	Pathaan	₹250 crore	2023	
9	Fighter	₹250 crore	2024	

=== Kannada ===
Kannada cinema is a part of Indian cinema based in Bengaluru. The films are made primarily in Kannada-language. The following table lists the top ten most expensive Kannada films produced in the Kannada film industry.

Rank	Title	Budget	Year	Ref.
1	Toxic (Note: The film was shot simultaneously in Kannada and English.)	₹500–1,000 crore	2026	
2	Kantara: Chapter 1	₹125 crore	2025	
3	Kabzaa	₹120 crore	2023	
4	KGF: Chapter 2	₹100 crore	2022	
4	KD: The Devil	₹100 crore	2026	
6	Vikrant Rona	₹95 crore	2023	
7	Martin	₹80–150 crore	2024	
8	KGF: Chapter 1	₹80 crore	2018	(Note: KGF: Chapter 1's reported budget varies between ₹50 crore (Hindustan Times) – ₹80 crore (Business Today))
9	Kurukshetra	₹75 crore	2019	
10	UI	₹60–100 crore	2024	

=== Malayalam ===
Malayalam cinema, also referred to as Mollywood by certain media outlets, is a part of Indian cinema, based in Kerala and dedicated to the production of films in the Malayalam-language. The following table lists the 10 most expensive Malayalam films produced in the Malayalam film industry.

Rank	Title	Budget	Year	Ref.
1	L2: Empuraan	₹150–175 crore	2025	
2	Patriot	₹140 crore	2026	
3	Marakkar: Lion of the Arabian Sea	₹100 crore	2021	
4	The Goat Life	₹82 crore	2024	
5	Barroz 3D	₹80–150 crore	2024	
6	I'm Game	₹80 crore	2026	
7	Turbo	₹70 crore	2024	
8	Malaikottai Vaaliban	₹60–65 crore	2024	
9	Aadu 3	₹50–60 crore	2026	
9	Khalifa: The Ruler	₹50–60 crore	2026	

=== Marathi ===
Marathi cinema is a part of Indian cinema, dedicated to the production of films in the Marathi-language and is based in Mumbai, Maharashtra. The following table lists the top ten most expensive Marathi films produced in the Marathi film industry.

Rank	Title	Budget	Year	Ref.
1	Raja Shivaji (Note: The film was shot simultaneously in Marathi and Hindi.)	₹75 crore	2026	
2	Ved	₹15 crore	2022	
3	Punha Shivajiraje Bhosale	₹13 crore	2025	
4	Dashavatar	₹12.50 crore	2025	
5	Har Har Mahadev	₹10–15 crore	2022	
6	Subhedar	₹10 crore	2023	
7	Deool Band 2	₹8–10 crore	2026	
7	Ghar Banduk Biryani	₹8–10 crore	2023	
7	Timepass 3	₹8–10 crore	2022	
10	Dharmaveer	₹8 crore	2022	
10	Dharmaveer 2	₹8 crore	2024	

=== Meitei ===
Meitei cinema is a part of Indian cinema, dedicated to the production of films in the Meitei-language (officially Manipuri-language) and is based in Manipur. The following table lists the top most expensive Meitei films produced in the Meitei film industry.

Rank	Title	Budget	Year	Ref.
1	My Japanese Niece	₹1 crore	2015	

=== Odia ===
Odia cinema, also known as Ollywood, is a part of Indian cinema, based in Cuttack, Odisha and dedicated to the production of films in the Odia-language. The following table lists the top most expensive Odia films produced in the Odia film industry.

Rank	Title	Budget	Year	Ref.
1	Shree Jagannath Nabakalebara	₹3 crore	2025	
1	Bou Buttu Bhuta	₹2.5 crore	2025	
3	Karma	₹2 crore	2024	

=== Punjabi ===
Punjabi cinema is a part of Indian cinema, dedicated to the production of films in the Punjabi-language films. It is based in Amritsar, Ludhiana and Mohali, Punjab. The following table lists the top most expensive Indian Punjabi films produced in the Punjabi film industry.

Rank	Title	Budget	Year	Ref.
1	Chaar Sahibzaade	₹20 crore	2014	

=== Tamil ===
Tamil cinema is a part of Indian cinema based in Chennai, Tamil Nadu. The films are made primarily in Tamil-language. The following table lists the top ten most expensive Tamil films produced in the Tamil film industry.

Rank	Title	Budget	Year	Ref.
1	2.0	₹400–600 crore	2018	
2	The Greatest of All Time	₹380–400 crore	2024	
3	Coolie	₹350–400 crore	2025	
4	Jana Nayagan	₹300–500 crore	2026	
5	Kanguva	₹300–350 crore	2024	
6	Vettaiyan	₹300 crore	2024	
7	Good Bad Ugly	₹270 crore	2025	
8	Leo	₹250–400 crore	2023	
9	Jailer 2	₹250–350 crore	2026	
10	Indian 2	₹250–300 crore	2024	(Note: Indian 2's reported budget varies between ₹250 crore (India Today) – ₹300 crore (News18))

=== Telugu ===
Telugu cinema is a part of Indian cinema producing films in the Telugu-language, in the states of Andhra Pradesh and Telangana and is centered in the Film Nagar neighbourhood of Hyderabad. The following table lists the top ten most expensive Telugu films.

Rank	Title	Budget	Year	Ref.
1	Varanasi	₹1,400 crore	2027	
2	Kalki 2898 AD	₹600 crore	2024	
3	RRR	₹550 crore	2022	
4	Adipurush	₹500–700 crore	2023	
5	Pushpa 2: The Rule	₹400–500 crore	2024	
6	The RajaSaab	₹400–450 crore	2026	
7	Game Changer	₹350–500 crore	2025	
8	Saaho	₹350 crore	2019	
9	Peddi	₹300–350 crore	2026	
10	Salaar: Part 1 – Ceasefire	₹270 crore	2023	

== Back-to-back films ==
This ranking features back-to-back Indian films—films in which two or more are shot as a single production, reducing both costs and time.

Most expensive back to back Indian films
Rank	Titles	Budget	Total budget	Language	Years	Ref.
1	Ponniyin Selvan: I	₹250 crore	₹500 crore	Tamil	2022	
1	Ponniyin Selvan: II	₹250 crore	₹500 crore	Tamil	2023	
2	Baahubali: The Beginning	₹180 crore	₹430 crore	Telugu	2015	(Note: Baahubali: The Beginning – ₹180 crore; Baahubali 2: The Conclusion – ₹250 crore)
2	Baahubali 2: The Conclusion	₹250 crore	₹430 crore	Telugu	2017	(Note: Baahubali: The Beginning – ₹180 crore; Baahubali 2: The Conclusion – ₹250 crore)
3	Dhurandhar	₹250–255 crore		Hindi	2025	
3	Dhurandhar: The Revenge	₹250–255 crore		Hindi	2026	
4	KGF: Chapter 1	₹80 crore	₹180 crore	Kannada	2018	
4	KGF: Chapter 2	₹100 crore	₹180 crore	Kannada	2022	

== Record-holders ==
The following table lists milestone Indian films by production budget, produced within the Indian film industry.

Timeline of the most expensive Indian filmsMost expensive Indian films by year
Year	Title	Budget	Language	Ref.
1913	Raja Harishchandra	₹15,000	Silent	(Note: As per the Samkhya hindu philosophy, Prakṛti is one of two eternal principles. It is composed of three gunas (prime qualities): sattva, rajas, and tamas.)
1931	Alam Ara	₹40,000	Hindustani	
1933	Sati Savitri	₹75,000	Telugu	
1943	Kismet	₹2 lakh	Hindustani	
1948	Chandralekha	₹30 lakh	Tamil	
1952	Aan	₹35 lakh	Hindi	
1953	Jhansi Ki Rani	₹60 lakh	Hindi	
1957	Mother India	₹60 lakh	Hindi	
1960	Mughal-e-Azam	₹1.5 crore	Hindi	
1975	Sholay	₹3 crore	Hindi	
1980	Shaan	₹6 crore	Hindi	
1983	Razia Sultan	₹7 crore	Hindi	
1991	Ajooba	₹8 crore	Hindi	
1993	Roop Ki Rani Choron Ka Raja	₹10 crore	Hindi	
1995	Trimurti	₹11 crore	Hindi	
1996	Indian	₹15 crore	Tamil	
1997	Ratchagan	₹18 crore	Tamil	
1998	Jeans	₹20 crore	Tamil	
2000	Raju Chacha	₹25 crore	Hindi	
2001	Lagaan	₹25 crore	Hindi	
2001	Kabhi Khushi Kabhie Gham	₹40 crore	Hindi	
2002	Devdas	₹50 crore	Hindi	
2005	Taj Mahal: An Eternal Love Story	₹50 crore	Hindi	
2007	Sivaji: The Boss	₹60 crore	Tamil	
2008	Dasavathaaram	₹60 crore	Tamil	
2008	Ghajini	₹65 crore	Hindi	
2009	Blue	₹75 crore	Hindi	
2010	My Name Is Khan	₹85 crore	Hindi	
2010	Enthiran	₹132–150 crore	Tamil	
2011	Ra.One	₹150 crore	Hindi	
2013	Dhoom 3	₹175 crore	Hindi	
2015	Baahubali: The Beginning	₹180 crore	Telugu	
2017	Baahubali 2: The Conclusion	₹250 crore	Telugu	
2018	2.0	₹400–600 crore	Tamil	
2022	RRR	₹550 crore	Telugu	
2024	Kalki 2898 AD	₹600 crore	Telugu	
2026	Ramayana: Part 1	₹2,000 crore	Hindi	
2027	Varanasi	₹1,400 crore	Telugu	

== See also ==
- List of most expensive films
- List of most expensive non-English-language films
- List of highest-grossing films
- List of highest-grossing Indian films
- List of Indian films with the highest digital rights
