= Trijya =

- Directed by: Akshay Sanjay Indikar
- Written by: Akshay Indikar, Kshama Padalkar
- Produced by: Arfi Lamba, Katharina Suckale, Arvind Pakhle
- Starring: Abhay Mahajan; Girish Kulkarni; Prashant Gite
- Cinematography: Swapnil Shete, Akshay Indikar
- Release dates: July 2019 (Shanghai International Film Festival); 22 December 2020
- Country: India
- Language: Marathi

Trijya (lit. 'Radius') is a 2019 Indian Marathi-language film, directed by Akshay Indikar and produced by Arfi Lamba, Katharina Suckale, Arvind Pakhle. It received Maharashtra State Film Award for Best Sound Design at 57th Maharashtra State Film Award.

== Cast ==
- Abhay Mahajan
- Prashant Gite
- Aarya Rothe
- Girish Kulkarni
- Shrikant Yadav
- Makrand Saptarshi
- Mahesh Bhosale
- Nandini Pakhre
- Hemant Adam
- Anjali Joglekar
- Shubhangi Shete
- Makarand Mukund
- Adwaita Jadhav
- Karishma Rathod
- Avinash Gaikwad
- Amar Gaikwad
- Varsha Malwadkar
- Gajanan Paranjpe
- Somnath Limbarkar
- Sagar Doltade
- Bhagwan Mhasge
- Chandu Dhumal
- Akshaya Upalanchi
- Akshara Upalanchi
