= Ek Hazarachi Note =

- Film poster
- Directed by: Shrihari Sathe
- Written by: Shrikant Bojewar
- Produced by: Shrihari Sathe
- Starring: Usha Naik; Sandeep Pathak; Shrikant Yadav; Ganesh Yadav; Pooja Nayak; Devendra Gaikwad
- Cinematography: Leung Ming Kai
- Edited by: Shrihari Sathe
- Music by: Shailendra Barve
- Production company: Infinitum Productions
- Release date: 9 May 2014
- Running time: 90 minutes
- Country: India
- Language: Marathi

Ek Hazarachi Note (English: 1000 Rupee Note) is a 2014 Indian film, directed and produced by Shrihari Sathe. It stars Usha Naik, Sandeep Pathak and Shrikant Yadav. The film was released on 9 May 2014 to positive reviews, and won the Silver Peacock - Best Feature Film at the 45th International Film Festival of India. It is spoken in the Varhadi and Marathi languages.

== Synopsis ==
During a political rally in a small village in Maharashtra, India, a poor old woman named Budhi receives a donation of several 1000 rupee notes from a politician. She goes shopping to the nearby market town with her neighbour, but fate has other plans for them.

== Cast ==
- Usha Naik as Budhi, the old lady
- Sandeep Pathak as Sudama, the goatherd
- Shrikant Yadav as Sub-inspector
- Ganesh Yadav as Uttamrao Jadhav, the politician running for re-election
- Pooja Nayak as Sudama's wife
- Devendra Gaikwad as Constable Shinde

== Production ==
Ek Hazarachi Note was directed by and produced by Shrihari Sathe.

Photography was by Hong Kong photographer Leung Ming Kai, and music by Shailendra Barve. Shrikant Bojewar wrote the script, and scenography was by Prashant Bidkar.

It is spoken in the Varhadi and Marathi languages.

== Release and critical reception ==
The film was released on 9 May 2014 to positive reviews.

The Times of India gave 3 stars (out of 5), saying "Keeping every minute detail of the story intact, Shrihari has struck gold with his first film. The cinematography is classy and the background score helps magnifying the beaty of every scene and emotion on the actors' faces. But the ace in the pack is Usha Naik whose mind-blowing performance is sure to evoke sympathy for her character in the viewers' minds. Sandeep Pathak too delivers with excellence and it is good to see him moving away from his stereotyped comic roles".

Sankhayan Ghosh of Indian Express wrote: "In the film, rather than the protagonist taking drastic decisions, things happen to her. Indian rural society is passive and people in power control their lives. I found it challenging to tell the story of a passive protagonist,"

== Awards ==
The film won many awards.

=== International ===
- Best Film, Ischia Film Festival 2015 (Italy)

=== India ===
- Silver Peacock - Best Feature Film at the 45th International Film Festival of India.
- Special Jury Award at 45th IFFI 2014

=== State awards ===
- Best Film (1st place) Maharashtra State Film Awards 2015
- Best Director (1st place) Maharashtra State Film Awards 2015
- Best Marathi Film Screenplay, Pune International Film Festival 2015
- Best Marathi Film Actor, Pune International Film Festival 2015
- Best Actress (Special Mention), Maharashtra State Film Awards 2015
- Best Actress, 21st Life OK Screen Awards 2015
- Best Supporting Actor (Male), Maharashtra State Film Awards 2015
