= Ghabadkund =

2026 Indian Marathi-language adventure suspense film

- Theatrical release poster
- Directed by: Pritam SK Patil
- Screenplay by: Sanjay Navgire; Akshay Dharmpal
- Story by: Pritam SK Patil; Akshay Dharmpal
- Produced by: Dr Rasik Kadam
- Starring: Sandeep Pathak; Devdatta Nage; Kushal Badrike; Shashank Shende; Prajakta Hanamghar; Vaishnavi Kalyankar
- Cinematography: Yogesh Koli
- Edited by: Saumitra Dharasurkar; Titiksha Bagul
- Music by: Background score: Abhinay Jagtap
- Production company: Icon De Style Pvt. Ltd.
- Distributed by: Cinepolis India
- Release date: 19 June 2026
- Running time: 132 minutes
- Country: India
- Language: Marathi
- Budget: ₹6 crore
- Box office: est.₹8.10 crore

Ghabadkund (transl. The Well of Hidden Treasure) is a 2026 Indian Marathi-language action adventure suspense thriller film directed by Pritam SK Patil and produced by Dr. Rasik Kadam under the banner of Icon De Style Pvt. Ltd. It features an ensemble cast including Sandeep Pathak, Devdatta Nage, Kushal Badrike, Prajakta Hanamghar, Vaishnavi Kalyankar and Shashank Shende.

The film was released in theatres on 19 June 2026 and is known as the first part of the Marathi Cinematic Universe (MCU), a new and unique effort to create a connected film franchise in Marathi cinema. Upon release, it received mixed to positive reviews and grossed ₹8.10 crore worldwide.

== Plot ==
A gang robs and kills a man and his pregnant wife. Later, one of the gang members, Dhuraji, betrays his leader Mhorkya, steals all the loot, and hides it in a dry well near a village. Soon after, Dhuraji is mysteriously killed by a supernatural force.

Over the years, the well becomes feared by the villagers. Much later, a simple villager named Dilya, who lives with his wife Soni and daughter, accidentally goes near the well and hears a strange voice from inside.

After hearing about this, four strangers, ASPP, Baba, Khangri, and Rangi, approach Dilya because they know the hidden treasure is in the well. They convince him to take them there. As they enter the well, they face strange supernatural events, growing mistrust, and dangerous challenges. The story revolves around who will get the treasure and whether destiny or human will is stronger.

== Cast ==
- Sandeep Pathak as Dilya
- Devdatta Nage as Khangri
- Kushal Badrike as Inspector ASPP
- Shashank Shende as Baba
- Prajakta Hanamghar as Soni
- Smita Paygude Anjute as Rangi
- Vaishnavi Kalyankar as a Pregnant lady
- Pravin Dalimbkar as Pidadya
- Rockey Deshmukh as Kisan
- Arohi Bhoir as Suli
- Yogesh Prakash Tanpure as the businessman
- Sahil Annaldewar as Dhuraji
- Dr. Rasik Kadam as Gavkari
- Pruthvi Gaikwad as Kisan's wife
- Prasad Surve as Mhorkya

== Production ==
Ghabadkund is helmed by Pritam SK Patil, who previously directed the successful Marathi suspense thriller Alyad Palyad. With this film, Patil set out to introduce the concept of a large-scale cinematic universe to Marathi cinema for the first time. The film combines elements of suspense, fantasy, horror, action, and Marathi folklore to create an immersive theatrical experience aimed at both regional and wider audiences.

For the production, a massive custom-built set was created at Khed Shivapur near Pune. Spread across nearly 10,000–12,000 square feet, the set included water tanks, ancient temple structures, caves, wells, and underground passageways, all designed to bring the mysterious village setting of the story to life.

== Release and reception ==
The teaser of Ghabadkund was released in mid-April 2026, followed by the official trailer on 1 June 2026. The film was theatrically released on 19 June 2026. It was released primarily in Marathi, with reports suggesting dubbed versions in additional languages as part of its wider cinematic universe plans.

=== Critical response ===
Ghabadkund received mixed reviews from critics. Kalpeshraj Kubal of Maharashtra Times also rated the film 3 out of 5 stars and wrote, "The director's ambition behind creating a confluence of folklore, fear, mystery and thrill is clearly felt." Santosh Bhingarde of Sakal gave the film 3 out of 5 stars, calling its music the "biggest strength," and wrote, "Overall, this film is a great blend of fear, thrill, and adventure." Mihir Bhanage of The Times of India rated the film 2.5 out of 5 stars and wrote, "Ghabadkund isn’t gripping as an individual film, but it’s interesting as the beginning of something new in Marathi cinema." Reshma Raikwar of Loksatta criticized the screenplay and editing, stating, "In the effort to make the sets and technical aspects impressive, the real “treasure” of entertainment seems to have been lost somewhere." Urmimala Banerjee of Variety described the story as "weak" and added, "If the makers had given some thought to the written material as they did to the visual imagery it could have been a different film."

=== Box Office ===
Ghabadkund opened to a modest start at the Indian box office, earning around ₹0.66 crore gross on its first day, with an estimated ₹0.55 crore net collection in India. By the end of its opening weekend, the film had collected ₹2.43 crore net in India and ₹2.72 crore worldwide, recovering nearly 40% of its budget. On its fourth day, the film added approximately ₹49 lakh, taking its India net collection to ₹2.92 crore and its worldwide gross to ₹3.27 crore. The film grossed ₹8.10 crore in two weeks.
