= Gaabh =

Indian black comedy drama film

- Theatrical release poster
- Directed by: Anup Jatratkar
- Written by: Anup Jatratkar
- Produced by: Suman Narayan Goture; Mangesh Narayan Goture
- Starring: Kailash Waghmare; Sayali Bandkar
- Cinematography: Veerdhaval Patil
- Edited by: Ravindra Chandekar
- Music by: Chandrashekhar Janawade
- Production companies: Timelapse Productions; AJ Multimedia Productions
- Distributed by: Panorama Studios
- Release date: 21 June 2024
- Country: India
- Language: Marathi

Gaabh is a 2024 Indian Marathi-language dark comedy-drama film written and directed by Anup Jatratkar and produced by Timelapse Productions and Multimedia Productions. The film features Kailash Waghmare, Sayali Bandkar in the leading roles. Gaabh won the Maharashtra State Film Award for Best Rural Film at 60th Maharashtra State Film Awards.

== Plot ==
Dadu, a man in his mid-thirties living with his elderly grandmother, acquires a buffalo to meet her demands. Constantly subjected to her taunts due to his unmarried status and perceived failures, Dadu harbors resentment towards his deceased father, whom he blames for his own unfinished education. He is in denial about his role in his father's suicide, attributing his problems solely to his father. When his new buffalo unexpectedly becomes pregnant, Dadu hesitates to arrange for its mating, further provoking his grandmother's criticisms. Frustrated by her incessant nagging, Dadu sets out to find a mate for the buffalo, but encounters difficulty due to the common practice of selling male calves to butchers. His search leads him to a village where he learns that the local male buffalo, intended for a wedding, has been absconded with by the bride. Dadu then undertakes the task of locating and recovering the runaway buffalo, embarking on a journey that ultimately leads him to a deeper self-discovery.

== Cast ==
- Kailash Waghmare as Dadu
- Sayali Bandkar as Fulwa
- Umesh Bolake as Gundyappa, Fulwa's father
- Vasundhara Pokhrankar as Dadu's grandmother
- Vikas Patil as Janya
- Chandrashekhar Janawade as Kisan

== Release ==
The film was theatrically released on 21 June 2024.

== Critical reception ==
Santosh Bhingarde of Sakal rated 3/5 stars and praised the film's cinematography, while the first half might feel a bit slow, the movie picks up speed in the second half, delivering a touching social message through a unique love story that highlights the special bond between humans and animals. Sanjay Ghaware of Lokmat rated 3/5 stars and praises the film for its unique blend of messages and its engaging, if slow, storyline that picks up after the interval. Shrikant Bhosale of ABP Majha also rated 3/5 stars and suggesting that while the film "Gaabh" offers a unique take on a love story and explores agricultural themes, its slower pace and rural focus might not resonate with urban viewers.

== Music ==
The lyrics, music, and sound design are created by Chandrasekhar Janwade, while the background score is composed by Ravindra Chandekar. The songs are performed by Anand Shinde, Prasannajit Kosambi, and Savani Ravindra.
