= Shrihari Sathe =

Indian filmmaker and producer

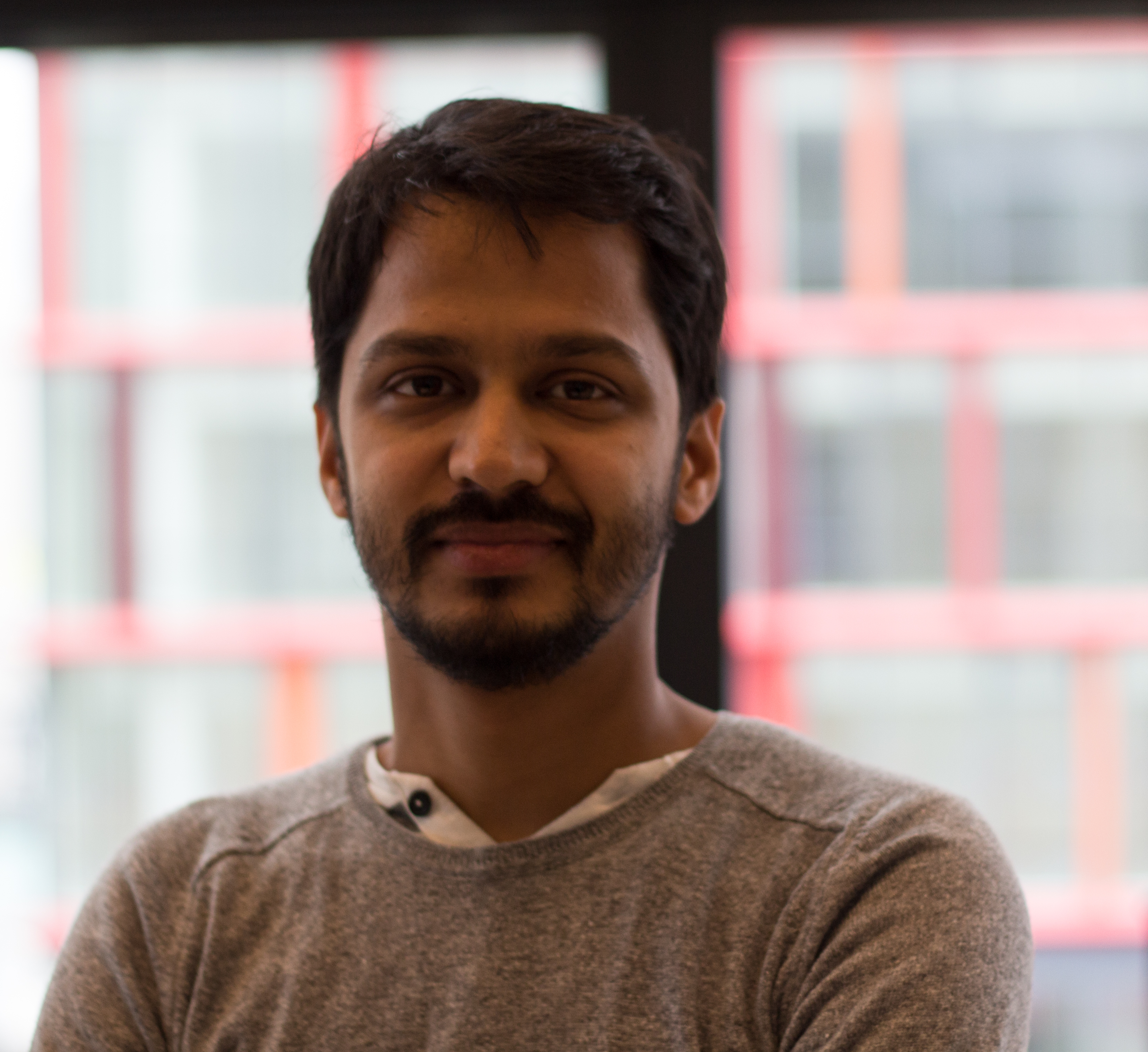
- Sathe at the International Film Festival Rotterdam
- Born: Shrihari Sathe; 1983 (age 42–43); Bombay, Maharashtra, India
- Education: St. Xavier's College, Mumbai; University of Michigan
- Occupations: Filmmaker; Producer
- Years active: 2009-present
- Known for: Ek Hazarachi Note (2014)

Shrihari Sathe is an Indian filmmaker and producer. Sathe is a 2013 Sundance Institute Creative Producing Fellow. His feature directorial debut, Ek Hazarachi Note (1000 Rupee Note), won the Special Jury Award and Centenary Award for Best Film at the 2014 International Film Festival of India and has received over 35 awards. He was a member of the jury at the 2017 Miami International Film Festival. Shrihari Sathe received the Producers Award 2019 as part of 34th Independent Spirit Awards.

Sathe is the recipient of the 2016 Cinereach Producer Award. He is a Trans Atlantic Partners fellow – 2013 and Cannes Producer's Network fellow – 2014, 2015, 2016. His selected short film credits include Breaking the Chain, Golden Palm Award winner at Mexico International Film Festival (2010), First Day of Peace, Grand Jury Prize winner at Slamdance Film Festival (2010) and Off Season, a BAFTA (2010) nominee. Sathe is a member of the Producers Guild of America, Indian Motion Picture Producers Association and Film Writers Association (India).

== Biography ==
Shrihari Sathe was born in 1983 in Bombay, Maharashtra, India. He did his schooling at St. Xavier's College, Mumbai and then moved to US at the age of 17. Sathe majored in Film and Video Studies and Global Media and Culture from University of Michigan, Ann Arbor. He also has an MFA-Film Degree from Columbia University's School of the Arts in New York. In 2007, he took a short sabbatical to assist Rakeysh Omprakash Mehra on his film Delhi-6. He spent almost a year working on that film and then returned to NYC to finish the degree.

His production house, Infinitum Productions, works out of Mumbai and New York. His father, Chandrashekhar Shrikrishna Sathe, worked in the banking industry for over 30 years, retired in 2009 and he decided to join work with Shrihari. They now closely develop projects.

Shrihari Sathe is currently a Visiting Associate Arts Professor in the Graduate Film Department at NYU Tisch School of the Arts. He has previously taught at Columbia University's School of the Arts, Harvard University, SUNY Stony Brook and frequently does master classes at various universities.

== Awards ==
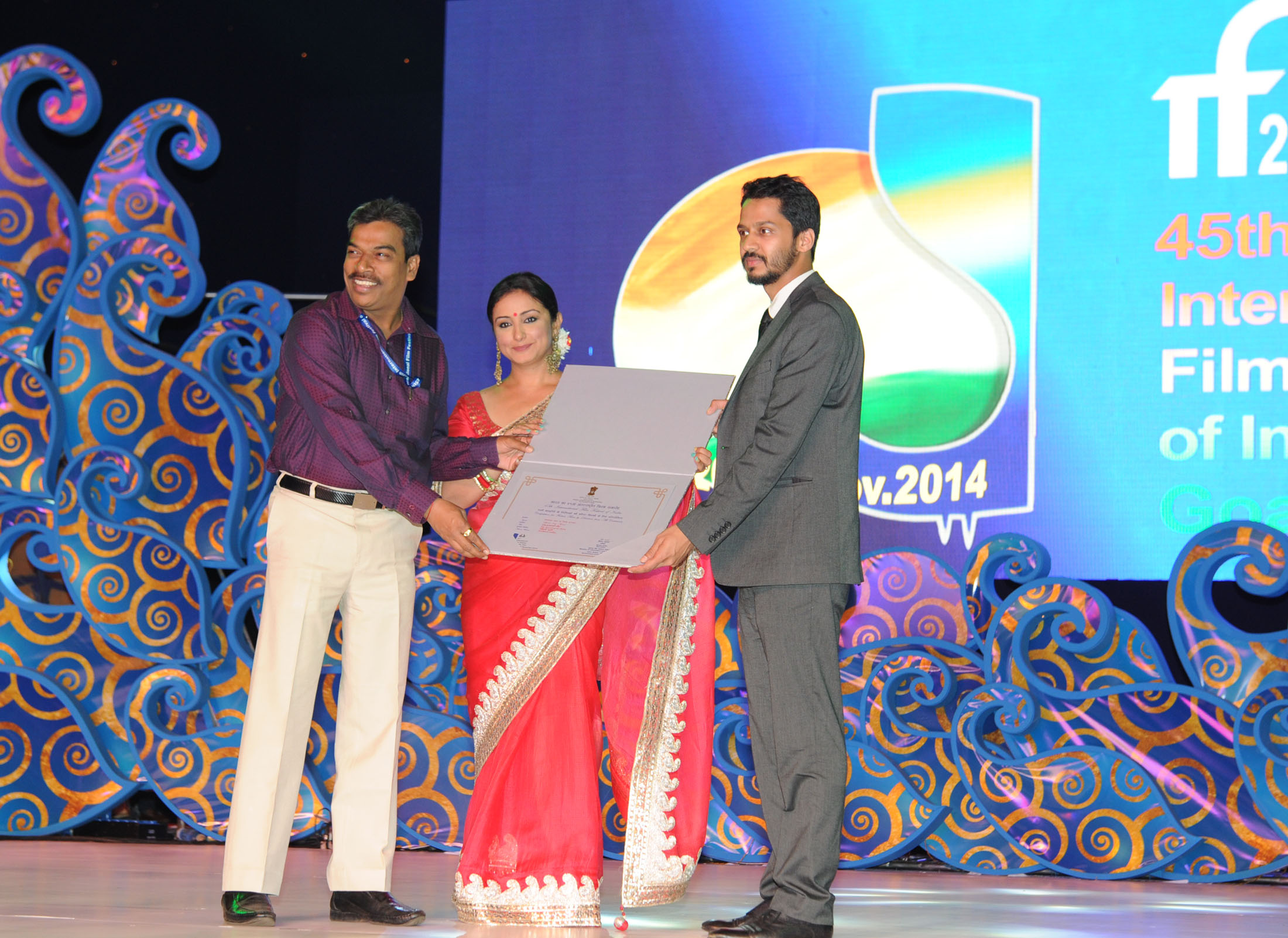
Shrihari Sathe, receiving the Special jury award at IFFI (2014)

- 34th Independent Spirit Awards: Producers Award 2019
- Cinereach Producer Award 2016 (Beach Rats, Dukhtar, It Felt Like Love)
- Ischia Film Festival: Best film 2015: Ek Hazarachi Note
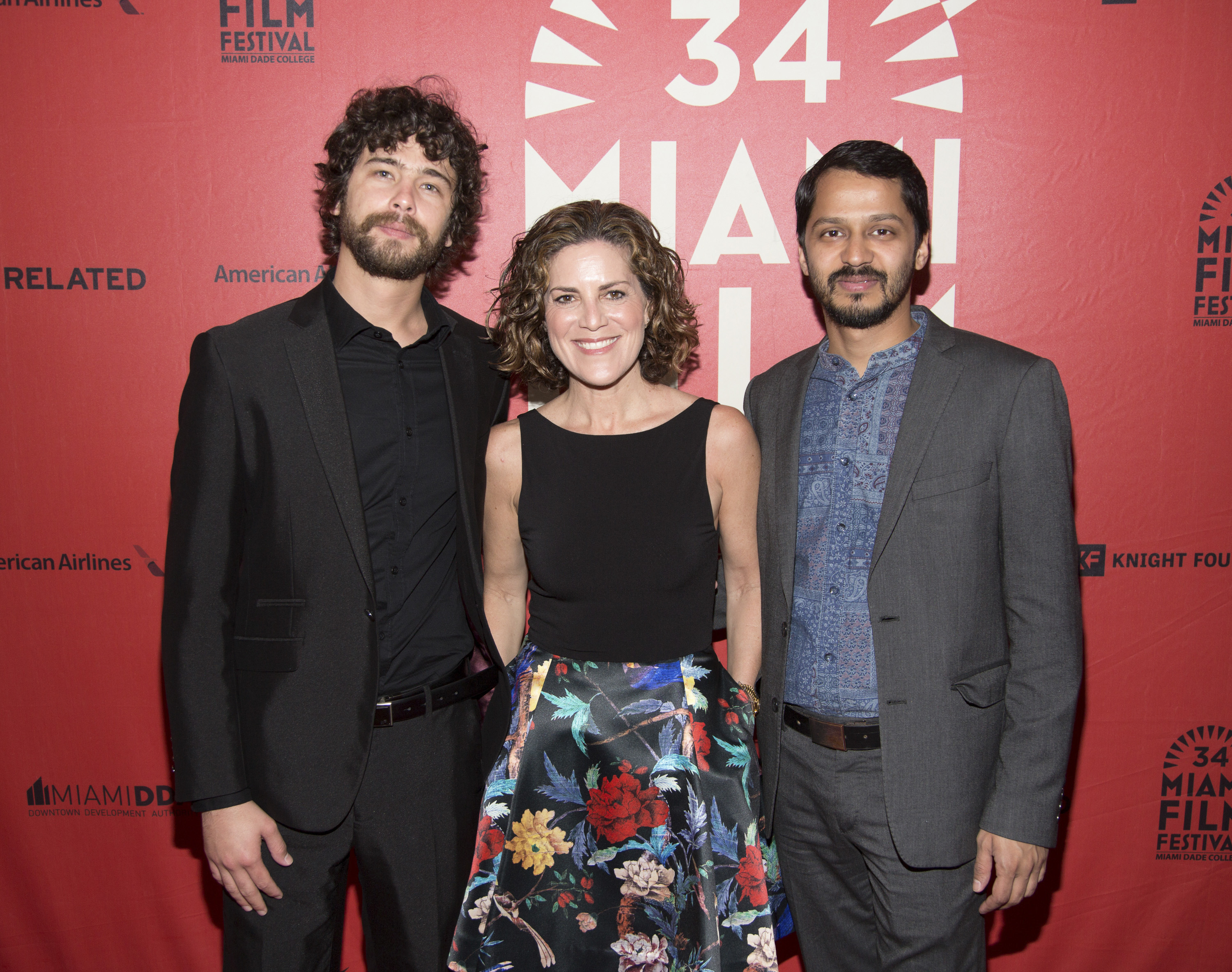
- Hector Medina, Leslie Cohen and Shrihari Sathe at the Closing Night Awards at Olympia Theater for Miami Film Festival Closing on 11 March 2017
  The 45th International Film Festival of India 2014
  - Silver Peacock (Best Film) for "Ek Hazarachi Note"
  - Centenary Award for "Ek Hazarachi Note"
- Columbia University Film Festival: Best producer 2009: Breaking the Chain

== Nominations ==
- Independent Spirit John Cassavetes Award: It Felt Like Love (Producer in the creative team) 2015
- Gotham Awards: Audience Award 2014 It Felt Like Love
- BAFTA Award for Best Short Film 2010: Off Season

== Filmography ==
- Director
  - 1000 Rupee Note (Ek Hazarachi) Note) 2014
- Producer
  - Stay Awake 2022
  - Slow Machine 2020
  - Screwdriver (Mafak) 2018
  - The Sweet Requiem 2018
  - Beach Rats 2017 (co-producer)
  - A Woman, A Part 2016
  - It Felt Like Love 2013
  - Off Season 2009
  - Breaking the Chain 2009
