= Prappeda =

Indian Malayalam sci-fi film

- Directed by: Krishnendu Kalesh
- Produced by: Jayanarayan Thulasidas
- Starring: Rajesh Madhavan; Ketaki Narayan
- Cinematography: Manesh Madhavan
- Edited by: Kiran Das
- Music by: Bijibal
- Production company: Hybrid Tellers
- Distributed by: Saina Play
- Release dates: December 2021 (IFFK); 26 January 2022 (Netherlands)
- Country: India
- Language: Malayalam

Prappeda, also known as Hawk's Muffin, is an Indian Malayalam sci-fi film directed by Krishnendu Kalesh featuring Rajesh Madhavan and Ketaki Narayan.

== Cast ==
- Rajesh Madhavan
- Ketaki Narayan

== Accolades ==
Year	Award	Category	Recipient	Result	Notes	Ref.
2021	Kerala State Film Awards	Best Debut Director	Krishnendu Kalesh	Won		
