= Devdatta Nage =

Indian actor

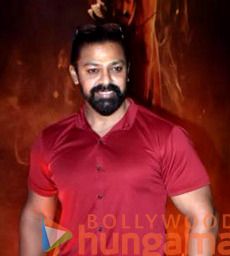
- Nage in 2023
- Born: 5 February 1981 (age 45); Pen, Maharashtra, India
- Occupation: Actor
- Years active: 2011–present
- Spouse: Kanchan Nage (m. 2010)

Devdatta Nage (born 5 February 1981) is an Indian actor who appears in Marathi films, Hindi films and television shows. He gained fame after playing the roles of Lord Khandoba and Bajrang in Jai Malhar and Adipurush, respectively.

== Personal life ==
Nage is from Alibag of Raigad district, Maharashtra, India. He lives in Mumbai, Maharashtra, India. He married Kanchan Nage.

== Career ==
He made his debut on television with Colors TV’s serial Veer Shivaji in which he played the role of Tanaji Malusare. He was also seen in Colors TV’s Laagi Tujhse Lagan.

He is seen in Star Pravah’s popular serial Devyani in which he played the role of Samratrao Vikhe Patil. He is best known for Zee Marathi’s popular serial Jai Malhar in which he played the role of Lord Khandoba.

He made his debut in Marathi film industry through film Sangharsh in 2014. His Hindi film debut was Once Upon ay Time in Mumbai Dobaara! in 2013 and Satyameva Jayate in 2018. In 2020, he appeared in Tanhaji: The Unsung Warrior in which he played the role of Suryaji Malusare.

He is making comeback on the small screen after two years with the serial Dr. Don which is aired on Zee Yuva channel. In 2023 he played the prominent role of Lord Hanuman in Om Raut's film Adipurush.

== Filmography ==
=== Films ===
Year	Title	Role	Language	Notes
2013	Once Upon ay Time in Mumbai Dobaara!	Cop	Hindi	
2014	Sangharsh	Avinash Waghmare	Marathi	
2018	Satyamev Jayate	Inspector Shankar Gaikwad	Hindi	
2020	Tanhaji	Suryaji Malusare	Hindi	
2023	Adipurush	Bajrang	Hindi; Telugu	
2024	Devaki Nandana Vasudeva	Kamsa Raju	Telugu	
2025	Robinhood	Saamy	Telugu	
2026	Ghabadkund	Khangri	Marathi	

=== Television ===
Year	Title	Role	Notes
2011	Veer Shivaji	Tanaji Malusare	Television debut
2011	Laagi Tujhse Lagan		
2012	Kalai Tasmay Namah	Krushna Patil	
2013–2014	Devyani	Samratrao Vikhe-Patil	
2014–2017	Jai Malhar	Lord Khandoba	Lead
2020–2021	Doctor Don	Dadasaheb Surve	
2022–2023	Jeev Majha Guntala	Tushar Desai	
2024–2025	Ude Ga Ambe	Mahadev	

== Awards and nominations ==
Zee Marathi Ustav Natyancha Awards
Year	Category	Serial	Role	Result	Ref.
2014	Best Actor	Jai Malhar	Khandoba	Nominated	
2015	Best Actor	Jai Malhar	Khandoba	Won	
2016	Best Actor	Jai Malhar	Khandoba	Nominated	
