= Vitthal Maza Sobati =

- Theatrical release poster
- Directed by: Sandeep Naware
- Written by: Vikram Edke
- Produced by: Pallavi Malekar
- Starring: Sandeep Pathak; Arun Nalawade; Rajendra Shisatkar; Aashay Kulkarni; Ashwini Kulkarni; Divya Pugaonkar; Abhay Rane
- Cinematography: Gaurav Ponkshe
- Edited by: Manu Asati
- Music by: Music: Gaurav Chati; Ganesh Surve; Score: Mukul Kashikar
- Production companies: Fakt Marathi; 99 Production
- Distributed by: Sunshine Studios
- Release date: 23 June 2023
- Country: India
- Language: Marathi

Vitthal Maza Sobati (transl. Vitthal is my Comrade) is a 2023 Indian Marathi-language drama film co-written and directed by Sandeep Naware starring Sandeep Pathak in the leading role. It is produced by Pallavi Malekar of Fakt Marathi in association with 99 Production. The film was released in theatres on 23 June 2023.

== Plot ==
The film is about a wealthy man who has a strong devotion to Lord Vitthal. His family, who is going through a lot of internal strife, is in a bad place. At that moment, Vitthal appears as their housekeeper, and he simply changes the family members' impressions of one another. At the end, we discover that Vitthal was none other than Lord Vitthal himself.

== Cast ==
- Sandeep Pathak as Vitthal
- Arun Nalawade as Dashrath "Dadasaheb" Deshmukh
- Rajendra Shisatkar as Ramesh
- Aashay Kulkarni as Prashant
- Ashwini Kulkarni as Lalita
- Divya Pugaonkar as Suman
- Abhay Rane as Nagesh

== Release ==
=== Theatre ===
The film was released in theatres on 23 June 2023 throughout Maharashtra.

== Critical reception ==
Santosh Bhingarde of Sakal, who gave three stars out of five, wrote: "There are not many turns and twists in the film. Also, the pace of the film is somewhat slow. The story of the film moves forward slowly in a straight and simple manner and we get immersed in Vitthal's devotion. Overall, this film is a description of the glory of Vitthal." Reshma Raikwar of Loksatta wrote: "It is a simple story of a god and a devotee, apart from this the does not offer anything else."

== Soundtrack ==
Vitthal Maza Sobati

Soundtrack album by Gaurav Chati, Ganesh Surve
- Released: 2023
- Genre: Feature film soundtrack
- Length: 10:06
- Language: Marathi
- Label: Aditi Music Company

Track listing
No.	Title	Lyrics	Music	Singer (s)	Length
1.	"Dev Vithuraya"	Shashank Kondvilkar	Ganesh Surve	Gaurav Chati	4:25
2.	"Devachiye Dwari (male version)"	Sant Dnyaneshwar	Gaurav Chati	Gaurav Chati	1:32
3.	"Man Jul La"	Shashank Kondvilkar	Gaurav Chati	Anurag Godbole, Veda Nerulkar	2:32
4.	"Devachiye Dwari (female version)"	Sant Dnyaneshwar	Gaurav Chati	Amita Ghugari	1:15
Total length:					10:06
