= Poshter Girl =

2016 Marathi film directed by Sameer Patil

- Directed by: Sameer Patil
- Written by: Hemant Dhome
- Produced by: Hadi Ali Abrar; Pushpank Gawade
- Starring: Sonalee Kulkarni; Jitendra Joshi; Hrishikesh Joshi; Aniket Vishwasrao; Hemant Dhome; Sandeep Pathak; Siddharth Menon; Akshay Tanksale
- Edited by: Kshitija Khandagale
- Music by: Amitraj
- Production companies: Viacom18 Motion Pictures; Chalo Film Banaye
- Release date: 12 February 2016
- Country: India
- Language: Marathi

Poshter Girl is a 2016 Indian Marathi-language drama film directed by Sameer Patil and written by Hemant Dhome, the film was produced by Chalo Film Banaye and Viacom18 Motion Pictures, it stars Sonalee Kulkarni, Jitendra Joshi, Hrishikesh Joshi, Aniket Vishwasrao, Hemant Dhome, Siddharth Menon, Sandeep Pathak, Akshay Tanksale, Anand Ingale and Vaibhav Mangale. The film was theatrically released on 12 February 2016.

== Plot ==
Poshter Girl takes the viewer on a mad roller coaster ride of a quaint, little village in Maharashtra - Paragao-Tekawde. There are no girls left in the village. When the question of boys' marriage arises, a beautiful and intelligent girl enters the scenario and changes everything. This is the story of the girl Rupali and her chosen five candidates who would do anything to win her heart.

== Cast ==
- Sonalee Kulkarni as Rupali Thorat
- Jitendra Joshi as Bharatrao Zende
- Hrishikesh Joshi as Kisanrao Thorat(Rupali'S' uncle)
- Aniket Vishwasrao as Bajrang Dudhbhate
- Hemant Dhome as Suraj
- Sandeep Pathak as Suresh Yadgaokar Patil
- Siddharth Menon as Arjun Kalal
- Neha Shitole as Mangal Kisanrao Thorat(Rupali'S' aunt)
- Rasika Sunil as Sangita (Lavani Dancer)
- Akshay Tanksale as Ramesh Yadgaokar Patil
- Anand Ingale
- Vaibhav Mangale
- Pratibha Bhagat as Rupali's mother

== Track listing ==
No.	Title	Lyrics	Music	Singer(s)	Length
01	"Awaaj Vadhav DJ"	Kshitij Patwardhan	Amitraj	Anand Shinde and Adarsh Shinde	4:16
02	"Simple Dimple"	Kshitij Patwardhan	Amitraj	Harshawardhan Wavare	3:55
03	"Kashala Lavato"	Guru Thakur	Amitraj	Amit Raj and Bela Shende	3:58
04	"Rakhumaai"	Vaibhav Joshi	Amitraj	Kasturi Wavare, Mrunmayee Shirish Dadke, Pragati Mukund Joshi, Rasika Ganu and Pallavi Telgaonkar	4:53

Vocalist Anand Shinde, sang a song for the first time professionally with his son Adarsh Shinde.
