= Adipurush =

2023 Indian film by Om Raut

- Theatrical release poster
- Directed by: Om Raut
- Screenplay by: Om Raut
- Dialogues by: Manoj Muntashir (Hindi); Bheem Srinivas (Telugu)
- Story by: Om Raut
- Based on: Ramayana by Valmiki
- Produced by: Bhushan Kumar; Krishan Kumar; Vamsi–Pramod; Om Raut; Prasad Sutar; Rajesh Nair
- Starring: Prabhas; Saif Ali Khan; Kriti Sanon; Sunny Singh; Devdatta Nage
- Cinematography: Karthik Palani
- Edited by: Apurva Motiwale; Ashish Mhatre
- Music by: Score: Sanchit Balhara and Ankit Balhara; Songs: Ajay–Atul; Sachet–Parampara
- Production companies: T-Series Films; Retrophiles
- Distributed by: UV Creations (Telugu); AA Films (Hindi); People Media Factory (Tamil); KRG Studios (Kannada)
- Release date: 16 June 2023
- Running time: 179 minutes
- Country: India
- Languages: Hindi; Telugu
- Budget: est. ₹500−700 crore
- Box office: est. ₹174 crore net Deccan Chronicle, and News18.

Adipurush (transl. The First Man) (Note: While Adipurush literally translates to "first man", Raut interprets it as "best man" in the context of the film.) is a 2023 Indian mythological action film inspired by the Hindu epic Ramayana. The film is directed and co-written by Om Raut, and produced by T-Series and Retrophiles. Produced in Bollywood, the film was shot simultaneously in Hindi and Telugu. The film features Prabhas, Saif Ali Khan, Kriti Sanon, Sunny Singh, and Devdutta Nage.

The film was announced in August 2020, through an official motion poster. Principal photography, which took place primarily in Mumbai, commenced in February 2021 and ended in November 2021. The film's music is composed by Ajay–Atul and Sachet-Parampara. Adipurush is budgeted at ₹500 crore (equivalent to ₹546 crore or US$58 million in 2026)-₹700 crore (equivalent to ₹764 crore or US$82 million in 2026) and became one of the most expensive Indian films.

Adipurush was released on 16 June 2023. It was heavily panned by critics and audiences alike, who criticised the film's screenplay, dialogues and visuals. It emerged as a box office bomb, though it became the second-highest grossing Telugu film of 2023.

== Plot ==
Over five thousand of years ago, Lankesh, the demon king of Lanka, obtains a divine boon from Brahma, the creator god, rendering him completely invincible against gods and demons alike, and immune to death during both day and night. Many years later in the kingdom of Ayodhya, King Dashratha is compelled to exile his eldest son, Raghava, for fourteen years to honor a vow made to his wife, Kaikeyi, ensuring her son Bharat ascends the throne. Raghava peacefully accepts the decree and retreats into the wilderness of the Panchavati forest near the Godavari River, accompanied by his virtuous wife, Janaki, and his fiercely loyal brother, Shesh.

While in the forest, Lankesh's sister, the demoness Shurpanakha, attempts to seduce Raghava and launches a lethal assault on Janaki. Shesh intervenes to protect Janaki, mutilating Shurpanakha by severing her nose. Outraged by his sister's humiliation and intrigued by her description of Janaki’s unparalleled beauty, Lankesh plots a retaliatory abduction. He deploys his henchman, Maricha, who transforms into a mystical golden deer to lure Raghava and Shesh away from their hermitage. Capitalizing on their absence, Lankesh kidnaps Janaki and imprisons her in his kingdom. Upon discovering her disappearance, Raghava and Shesh embark on a desperate rescue mission.

En route, they encounter the ascetic Shabari, who directs them toward Mount Rishyamukha. There, they forge a critical alliance with the exiled Vanara king, Sugriva, along with his commanders Jambavan and the mighty warrior Bajrang. To locate Janaki and assure her of her impending rescue, Raghava dispatches Bajrang to infiltrate Lanka. Bajrang leaps across the ocean and successfully delivers Raghava's message to Janaki. However, he is captured by Lankesh's formidable son, Indrajit, who orders Bajrang's tail to be set ablaze. Breaking free, Bajrang uses the fire to incinerate a large portion of Lanka before flying back to rally Raghava and the Vanara army.

To cross the sea, Raghava invokes Samudra, the ocean god, who grants them passage. The Vanara army constructs a floating stone bridge, allowing them to successfully march onto the shores of Lanka. Meanwhile, Lankesh's righteous brother, Vibhishana, is banished from the kingdom for opposing the abduction of Janaki; he promptly defects to Raghava’s side, offering vital strategic intelligence. When Lankesh flatly rejects a final peace ultimatum, a full-scale war commences. During an early skirmish, Indrajit mortally wounds Shesh with dark magic. Bajrang flies to the Himalayas and carries back an entire mountain containing the life-saving Sanjivani herb, successfully reviving Shesh.

Raghava orchestrates a decisive, three-pronged offensive against Lankesh’s palace. The first assault, led by Sugriva and Jambavan at the main gates, suffers heavy casualties from Lanka's advanced defensive artillery, but the tide turns when Raghava provides tactical aerial support via Bajrang. The second prong sees Shesh, Vibhishana, and Angad hunt down Indrajit; despite sustaining severe injuries, Shesh successfully executes the demon prince. Facing massive losses, Lankesh awakens his giant brother, Kumbhakarna, from his deep slumber, but Raghava and Shesh swiftly neutralize the behemoth when he overpowers Bajrang.

With his forces entirely decimated, Lankesh personally enters the battlefield. In a brutal final showdown, Raghava battles the demon king, ultimately realizing the loophole in the divine boon: Lankesh can only be destroyed during twilight, the precise transition between day and night. Raghava delivers the fatal blow at dusk, obliterating Lankesh and securing Janaki's freedom. Having successfully completed their fourteen-year exile, Raghava, Janaki, and Shesh return triumphantly to Ayodhya, where Raghava is crowned king with Janaki as his queen, establishing a new era of righteousness.

== Cast ==
- Prabhas as Raghava
- Saif Ali Khan as Lankesh
- Kriti Sanon as Janaki
- Sunny Singh as Shesh
- Devdatta Nage as Bajrang
- Vatsal Sheth as Indrajit
- Sonal Chauhan as Mandodari
- Siddhant Karnick as Vibhishana
- Ayesha Madhukar as Maya
- Tejaswini Pandit as Shurpanakha
- Krishna Kotian as Dasharatha
- Sonali Khare as Kaikeyi
- Lavi Pajni as Kumbhakarna
- Ajit Shidhaye as Prahasta
- Asha Sharma as Shabari
  - Urvi Singh as the young Shabari
- Bijay J. Anand as Brahma
- Neha Khan as Trijata
- Rehan Khan as Maricha
- Gaurrav Walia as Sugriva
- Manohar Pandey as Angad
- Roopesh Jadhav as Jambavan
- Kaustav Sinha as Nala
- Saurabh Thakare as Nila
- Prashant Uthale as Shuka
- Rajesh K Salhotra as Dhakdasur (Character based on Jambumali)

== Production ==
=== Development ===
Adipurush, an adaptation of the Hindu epic Ramayana, was announced on 18 August 2020, via a promotional poster. Prabhas portrays Rama under the direction of Om Raut who earlier helmed the period action film Tanhaji (2020). Om Raut was fascinated by the 1992 Japanese film Ramayana: The Legend of Prince Rama and was motivated to adapt the Ramayana into a film using modern technology. Raut wrote the script amidst COVID-19 lockdown in India. Prabhas immediately liked the project and the production company T-Series Films was on board for the project.

Adipurush is one of the most expensive Indian films ever made, with a budget of ₹550-800 crore. The film was initially reported to have a budget of 500-600 crores, however after the release of first teaser, the film was met with severe backlash for the poor quality of VFX and CGI, despite having a humungous budget, which compelled the makers to postpone the film by five months and an additional budget of 100-200 crores was assigned to improve the quality of VFX and CGI. It was shot simultaneously in Hindi and Telugu languages, while also filmed in 3D.

=== Casting ===
In September 2020, the makers revealed that Prabhas is enacting Rama's portrayal whose character name was later revealed as Raghava. Saif Ali Khan, who already worked as an antagonist in Raut's Tanhaji, signed on for the role of Ravana, with the alias name, Lankesh. After rumours of Anushka Shetty, Anushka Sharma, Kiara Advani, and Keerthy Suresh being approached for the role of Sita, with the alias name of Janaki, it was reported in November 2020 that Kriti Sanon has been cast to essay the role; her inclusion into the film was confirmed by the makers four months later in March 2021. Sunny Singh, who joined the sets in February 2021, played Lakshmana, with the alias name being Shesh. Sharad Kelkar dubbed for Prabhas in the Hindi version while P. Ravi Shankar dubbed for Saif Ali Khan in the Telugu, Tamil and Kannada versions.

=== Filming ===
Motion capture shoot for Adipurush begun on 19 January 2021. Muhurtam shot and formal launch was done on 2 February 2021 in Mumbai, India. Principal photography of the movie began that day, as informed by the makers. A massive fire accident took place at the filming location in Mumbai on the same day. Duplicate sets were erected same wise due to the fire break-out. In October 2021, Khan and Sanon wrapped up shoot. On 10 November 2021, the filming was completed.

== Music ==
Adipurush

Soundtrack album by Ajay–Atul and Sachet–Parampara
- Released: 6 June 2023
- Recorded: 2021–2022
- Genre: Feature film soundtrack
- Length: 18:22
- Languages: Hindi; Telugu
- Label: T-Series

Official audio1
- Adipurush (Hindi) - Full Jukebox on YouTube

Official audio2
- Adipurush (Telugu) - Full Jukebox on YouTube

The music for both the Hindi and Telugu versions of the film is composed by Ajay–Atul and Sachet–Parampara (noted). The first single titled "Jai Shri Ram" was released in its short version on 6 April 2023 on the occasion of Hanuman Jayanti. The full song was released on 20 May 2023 under the same name in Hindi and Telugu alongside dubbed versions (Tamil, Kannada and Malayalam). The second single titled "Ram Siya Ram" (in Hindi) and "Ram Sita Ram" (in Telugu) was released on 29 May 2023.

All lyrics are written by Manoj Muntashir.

Hindi track listing
No.	Title	Singer(s)	Length
1.	"Jai Shri Ram"	Atul Gogavale, Gwen Dias, Shazneen Arethna, Crystal Sequeira, Marianne D'Cruz Aiman, Umesh Joshi, Swapnil Godbole, Janardan Dhatrak, Vivek Naik, Santosh Bote, Devendra Chitnis, Yash Kulkarni, Mangesh Shirke, Anil Bhilare, Gaurav Dandekar, Siddhant Karawde, Rishikesh Patil, Ameya Paranjape, Vidit Patankar, Yashad Ghanekar, Prasad Manjrekar	3:32
2.	"Shivoham"	Ajay Gogavale	3:56
3.	"Tu Hai Sheetal Dhaara"	Sonu Nigam, Shreya Ghoshal	3:21
4.	"Huppa Huiya"	Sukhwinder Singh	3:43
5.	"Ram Siya Ram" (Music by Sachet–Parampara)	Sachet–Parampara	3:50
Total length:			18:22

All lyrics are written by Ramajogayya Sastry.

Telugu track listing
No.	Title	Singer(s)	Length
1.	"Jai Shri Ram"	Gwen Dias, Shazneen Arethna, Crystal Sequeira, Marianne D'Cruz Aiman, Umesh Joshi, Swapnil Godbole, Janardan Dhatrak, Vivek Naik, Santosh Bote, Devendra Chitnis, Yash Kulkarni, Mangesh Shirke, Anil Bhilare, Gaurav Dandekar, Siddhant Karawde, Rishikesh Patil, Ameya Paranjape, Vidit Patankar, Yashad Ghanekar, Prasad Manjrekar	3:32
2.	"Shivoham"	Haricharan	3:56
3.	"Priya Mithunam"	Karthik, Shweta Mohan	3:21
4.	"Huppa Huiya"	Sukhwinder Singh	3:43
5.	"Ram Sita Ram" (Music by Sachet–Parampara)	Karthik	3:50
Total length:			18:22

== Marketing ==
The film's teaser was released on 2 October 2022 on the occasion of Gandhi Jayanti. The teaser received heavy criticism for its visual effects and CGI. The film's trailer was released on 9 May 2023, and was seen as an improvement from the teaser with regards to the visuals. The final trailer of the film was released on 6 June 2023.

== Release ==
=== Theatrical ===
Adipurush was theatrically released on 16 June 2023 in Hindi and Telugu, along with dubbed versions in Tamil, Kannada, Malayalam. It was previously scheduled to release on 11 August 2022, but was later postponed due to the release of Laal Singh Chaddha. The film was postponed again to avoid a clash with Veera Simha Reddy and Waltair Veerayya and also to rework the visual effects, due to the severe backlash after the release of the teaser trailer.

The film was initially reported to have a budget of 500-600 crores, making it one of the most expensive Indian films ever made, however after the release of first teaser, the film was met with severe backlash for the poor quality of VFX and CGI, despite having a humungous budget, which compelled the makers to postpone the film by five months and an additional budget of 100-200 crores was assigned to improve the quality of VFX and CGI.

The film was set to premiere at the Tribeca Festival in the Escape From Tribeca section on 13 June 2023, but was cancelled by the makers later. The film was supposed to be played at the Film Festival on 15 and 17 June, but its world premiere, 3 days before the world release had been put down.

The film was also initially scheduled for an IMAX release, which was cancelled later due to the simultaneous release and advance booking of screens for The Flash; the IMAX rulebook does not allow two IMAX films to release on the same day.

The film was initially stopped from release in Nepal citing an issue with a specific dialogue in the film where Goddess Janaki is referred to as the "daughter of India". The controversial dialogue was later removed from the film as per the media reports. Vedic records show Goddess Sita was born in Mithila but the site is controversial. Indians believe that Goddess Sita was born in part of Mithila which falls in India, the present day Sitamarhi in Bihar. Where as Nepalese believe that Goddess Sita was born in part of Mithila which falls in Nepal, the present day Janakpur in Madhesh Province. This further resulted in all Indian films being banned from releasing in the Kathmandu Metropolitan area.

=== Home media ===
The film was premiered on Netflix from 11 August 2023 in Hindi. The film was also premiered on Amazon Prime Video from 11 August 2023 in Telugu and dubbed versions of Tamil, Kannada and Malayalam languages.

=== Game ===
Epic Quiz : Adipurush, a quiz and adventure mobile video game was developed by Hungama Games as a tie-in release for the film.

== Reception ==
=== Box office ===
After a strong opening weekend, Adipurush had a sharp decline in collections on Monday, and dropped further on Tuesday. After 14 days of release, News18 Telugu reported that the film has collected a total worldwide gross of ₹388.35 crore, with a distributors' share of ₹191.42 crore. Although the production team announced that the film has grossed ₹450 crore worldwide, the trade figures were differed with News18 Telugu reporting that the film has not even grossed more than ₹300 crore in India.

=== Critical response ===
On the review aggregator website Rotten Tomatoes, 7% of 15 critics' reviews are positive, with an average rating of 4/10.

Shubhra Gupta of The Indian Express gave Adipurush 1.5/5, criticising the screenplay and visuals, and described the film as "a series of clunky computer graphics, bathed in Bollywoodese." She later named the film as the 2nd-worst film of 2023. Awarding the same rating, Saibal Chatterjee of NDTV called the film a "weird blend of fantasy and fallacy". Rediff.com's Deepa Gahlot dismissed it as a "travesty", and criticised the dialogues and the visual effects. Likewise, Simon Abrams of RogerEbert.com criticised the writing and visuals of the film, saying "...it all looks cheap and uninspired."

Scroll.in's Nandini Ramnath wrote that the adaptation "lacks [...] a sense of wonderment."

Bollywood Hungama found Adipurush to be a "well-made entertainer with a big-screen appeal". Renuka Vyavahare of The Times of India gave the film 3 out of 5 stars, writing "This one's a sincere attempt that gets a tad overwhelmed by its ambition of handling a story of this magnitude". In a mixed review, Anindita Mukherjee of India Today stated that "All in all, we can't put a stamp on all the hype that Adipurush has been gathering, but it surely deserves one watch at the theatres. For Prabhas, if nothing else". India Today later included the film as one of the five worst Hindi films of 2023.

== Controversies ==
Adipurush has been the subject of various controversies since its creation in 2022. In particular, the film has often been criticised by many actors and other critics for its use of modern-day language and theological inaccuracies, both in the film's scenes and its character modifications.

The modification of dialogue and the misinterpreted depiction of the Ramayana have led to a broad sense of moral panic amongst various Hindu organisations, which have called for a ban on the film.

=== Allahabad High Court on Adipurush ===
The Allahabad High Court criticised the filmmakers for portraying religious characters (including Rama and Hanuman) in an objectionable manner and characterised the film as testing the tolerance of Hindus.

The Court also noted that all the characters of the Ramayana, who are worshipped by Hindus, are largely shown in a "pathetic way". The Court inquired as to what made the Central Board of Film Certification pass such a film, stating that the CBFC committed a "blunder" by certifying it.

Public Interest Litigation was filed on 23 June 2023, seeking to stop broadcast of the film on streaming platforms. The petition alleges that the film hurts the religious sentiments of a "large section of society" due to the dialogue used by the characters in the film.

=== Reactions after the teaser release ===
Right after the teaser was released in October 2022, the makers were criticised for its poor VFX, provided Saif Ali Khan's look as Ravana with a beard made social media users question if he was playing Ravana, Babur or Alauddin Khalji in the film. BJP spokesperson Malavika Avinash criticised Om Raut for 'misrepresentation' of Ramayana, depicting Raavana with "blue eye makeup and is wearing leather jackets". Madhya Pradesh Home Minister Narottam Mishra criticised the teaser with comments on Hanuman's look in the film and stated to write a letter to Om Raut to remove all such scenes from the film. If not removed, he will consider legal action. Actor Arun Mandola also stated his views as director (Raut) failed to understand the Indian audience and accused the makers for copying scenes from Game of Thrones, Planet of the Apes and The Jungle Book. Prem Sagar, son of director Ramanand Sagar also criticised the teaser, stating if the project was offered, he would have rejected due to "his upbringing and culture". He further added, "How can you stop anyone from creating anything?". Actress Dipika Chikhlia, who portrayed Sita on Ramanand Sagar's Ramayan also criticised the teaser, stating she did not approve the VFX and there has been altercations to the epic. Actor Sunil Lahri, who played Lakshman in Ramanand Sagar's Ramayan, commented in lieu of the VFX and its depiction, that nonsense in the name of religion will never be tolerated.

Amidst the controversy, director Om Raut defended the teaser and kept his views that he was unhappy with the reactions from audiences and other celebrities for criticising the teasers and story and stated its not made for cellphones. Actress Kriti Sanon also defended the teasers, stating, "that the film is not just about the teaser but there is a lot more to it." After the criticism, the makers asked for some time for improving the VFX and its quality, which may cost an additional ₹100 crore, as per reports.

=== Reactions on the film's posters ===
Aftermath of the teaser controversy, it was stated that the film's poster was also copied from an animation firm Vaanar Sena Studios and they claimed that they were not given any credit for the same. Also the studio claimed that the poster of Adipurush was a direct rip-off of their animated film Lord Shiva.

In March 2023, a new poster was released, which created another controversy. The new poster was criticised for looking like an "animated film". Another poster was also criticised for hurting the religious sentiments as according to the Ramcharitmanas, all the characters of the Ramayana wear a sacred thread called Janeu, which is worn by those who follow the Hindu religion, however in the posters it was not worn by the characters played by Prabhas, Sunny Singh and Devdatta Nage.

=== Dialogues of Adipurush ===
Manoj Muntashir wrote the dialogues of Om Raut's film Adipurush. The dialogues of the film were criticised for being too flippant or unserious and containing modern-day slang and lingo in a medieval setting. Lines like "jalegī tere bāp kī", "terī buā kā baghīcā hai kyā", and "Laṅkā lagā deṁge" being uttered by gods did not go down well with a large section of the viewers as the whole story of the film has destroyed and modified every aspect of the core values of the characters, their language and each authentic event. The petition filled in the high court demanded that the film malign the image of deities by using foul language in the dialogues spoken by the actors portraying Hindu gods. "They cannot be allowed to go scot-free in the name of Freedom of Speech and Expression."

Prem Sagar, son of director Ramanand Sagar, said, "It might be a misjudgement that the younger generation would like it. But you can't do this with the audience. Don't say it is based on Valmiki Ramayan, give it any other name. Make it a fantasy film. But if you're making Ramayan then you cannot hurt the sentiments. People watch this with devotion". His brother, Moti Sagar, too felt that the makers could have been more 'careful' in their approach towards the epic. "Certain dialogues, which I am reading on the news and on Twitter, I can say they could have been careful," he told PTI.

One of the lines in the film, which refers to Sita as "Bhārata kī beṭī", has caused anger among the people of Nepal. This is because Sita is believed to have been born in Janakpur, which is located in present-day Nepal. Although the filmmakers agreed to remove that particular dialogue from the film, another inaccurate statement about the sovereignty of Nepal has further infuriated the Nepalese people. In an interview on Aaj Tak, Manoj attempted to dismiss the claims of the Nepalese people by incorrectly stating that Nepal was a part of "Bharat" until 1904 and mentioned that it separated from "Bharat". Manoj has been accused of misrepresenting historical facts, leading to calls for a ban on all Hindi films in Nepal.

Shiv Sena (UBT) MP Priyanka Chaturvedi criticised the makers for allegedly using "pedestrian dialogues" in the film. She also demanded an apology from the film's makers and said that the dialogues were disrespectful to the characters of the Hindu epic Ramayana. Similarly, Chhattisgarh Chief Minister Bhupesh Baghel alleged that dialogues in the film are "objectionable and indecent" and questioned the "silence" of political parties which call themselves the custodian of religion, an apparent jibe at the BJP. When asked by reporters whether the state government will ban this film, Baghel said, "The government will think about it (ban) if people will raise a demand in this direction".

Responding to the criticism, Manoj Muntashir defended his work. In an interview with Republic World, he said, "It is not an error. It is a very meticulous thought process that has gone into writing the dialogues for Bajrangabali and for all the characters. We have made it simple because we have to understand one thing if there are multiple characters in a film, all cannot speak the same language. There has to be a kind of diversion, a kind of division."

Muntashir also mentioned, "When our grandmothers narrated the tales of Ramayana, they used this language. The dialogue that you mentioned, priests and narrators used to say that in the same way I have written. I'm not the first one to write this dialogue, it's already there."

However, later he announced that it had been decided that some lines of the dialogue in the film would be altered. In a statement on Twitter, he concluded, "I can give countless arguments in favour of my dialogues, but this will not reduce your pain. Me and the producer-director of the film have decided that some of the dialogues which are hurting you, We'll revise them, and they'll be added to the film this week. May Shri Ram bless you all!"

=== Backtracking and making contradictory statements ===
In a video, which went viral on social media, Muntashir said: "If people think we are trying to modernise the Ramayan, I want to tell them that not at all. We have presented the Ramayan just like how people heard in stories during their childhood." In a more recent interview, he said, "The film's name is Adipurush. We have not made the Ramayan; we are just inspired by it," he said.

=== Claiming that Hanuman is 'not a god' ===
In another interview with Aaj Tak, Muntashir said, "Lord Hanuman is not God but a mere devotee. We made him God because his devotion had that power." This statement led to a political slugfest, where the AAP and Congress attacked the governing BJP for "blessing" the film whose makers don't consider Bajrangbali as God.

While the Shiva Purana specifically refers to Hanuman as an 'incarnation' of Shiva, other Puranas and scriptures provide alternative perspectives. According to these sources, Bajrangbali is commonly regarded as the spiritual son of Vayu, the deity of wind, or as an incarnation of Vayu himself. In some instances, Hanuman is also identified as an avatar of Rudra, another name associated with Shiva.

=== Apology ===
In 2026, Muntashir eventually admitted that working on the film was a mistake, and defending it after the backlash only made matters worse. Taking the complete blame, he sought forgiveness from the people of the country. He further added that looking back, he felt ashamed that he wrote those particular dialogues and didn't know what state of mind he was in while writing them. He maintained that the criticism over the film's dialogues was justified and accepted responsibility for the writing.

=== Ban in Nepal ===
Banning only this film in the Kathmandu municipality while it runs in other parts of the country and abroad will establish a misleading fact. So screening of any Indian film will be prohibited from tomorrow [Monday] in Kathmandu municipality unless the objectionable part is removed from the film.

— Balen Shah wrote on social media.

After the release of the film, a dialogue in the film referring to Sita as the "daughter of India" created a controversy in Nepal. The Mayor of Kathmandu, Balen Shah banned the film, stating that the birthplace of Sita was shown in the film as being in India rather than Nepal. After the film was banned in Kathmandu, the film was also banned in Pokhara. Police personnel were deployed across 17 halls in Kathmandu to ensure that no Hindi film was screened, as the dialogues in the film remained unchanged.

However, a court in Nepal lifted the ban on Hindi films in various regions of the country. The court asked the authorities to not halt the screening of Hindi films including Adipurush in the cinemas of Nepal. The judgment was not taken well by Kathmandu Mayor Balendra Shah, who first imposed the ban. He said that he is ready to face any punishment but will not allow the screening of the film.

=== FIR ===
On 18 June 2023, Akhil Bharatiya Hindu Mahasabha lodged an FIR with the Hazratganj police against the producers and cast. In his complaint, Hindu Mahasabha national spokesperson Chaturvedi said that the film was a deliberate attempt to insult Hindu sentiments by distorting the images of Hindu gods with offensive dialogues, and costumes.

== See also ==
- Ram Setu, 2022 film involving Adam's Bridge
