= Samaira (film) =

- Theatrical release poster
- Directed by: Rishi Deshpande
- Written by: Sumit Vilas Tambe
- Produced by: Jagannath Surpure; Ratan Surpure; Shashikant Panat; Yohesh Alandkar; Rishi Deshpande.
- Starring: Ketaki Narayan; Ankur Rathee
- Production companies: Global Sewa LLC; Aadyot Films
- Distributed by: Sunshine Studios
- Release date: 26 August 2022
- Country: India
- Language: Marathi

Samaira is a 2022 Indian Marathi-language drama film directed by Rishi Deshpande and produced by Aadyot Films and Global Sewa. The film stars Ketaki Narayan and Ankur Rathee in lead roles and Satish Pulekar, Rohit Kokate, Madhav Abhyankar in supporting roles.

The film was theatrically released on 26 August 2022.

== Cast ==
- Ketaki Narayan
- Ankur Rathee
- Satish Pulekar
- Rohit Kokate
- Jui Pawar
- Manasi Joshi
- Madhav Abhyankar
- Vinamra Babhal
- Nitin Bhajan
- Aparna Desai
- Mahesh Joshi
- Rohit Kokate
- Radhika Nanivdekar

== Production ==
Filming for Samaira began in 2017, originally titled Nirmal Enroute. Ketaki Narayan joined the project after Prasad, a Facebook friend who worked in casting, noticed her blog posts and reached out to her about the film. He encouraged her to audition, and she decided to go for it. Talking about her decision to join the film, Narayan shared,

"I felt that 'Samaira' is not a very heroic character. It was a more internal journey and that was very interesting for me. I am a big fan of Iranian cinema. I felt that this film goes in that kind of zone. So, I decided that I want to be a part of it."

== Release ==
The film was theatrically released on 26 August 2022.

== Reception ==
=== Critical reception ===
Mihir Bhanage of The Times of India rates it 2 out of 5 and praised the acting performances of Ketaki and Ankur.

== Music ==
Samaira

Soundtrack album by Nihar Shembekar
- Released: 28 August 2022
- Genre: Feature film soundtrack
- Length: 22:18
- Language: Marathi
- Label: Zee Music Company

Official audio
- Samaira - Full Album on YouTube

All music is composed by Nihar Shembekar.

Track listing
No.	Title	Singer (s)	Length
1.	"Ala Re Hari Ala Re"	Nihar Shembekar, Julie Joglekar	4:17
2.	"Sundar Te Dhyan"	Julie Joglekar	3:20
3.	"Sajun Dhajun"	Aarti Ankalikar-Tikekar, Julie Joglekar	3:05
4.	"Pundalik Warde"	Julie Joglekar	4:49
5.	"Nirmal Prarthana"	Sai Kunte, Sai Godbole, Janhavi Gawkar, Megh Rane, Ruchi Gadgil	3:51
6.	"Jason's Theme"	Ankur Rathee	1:42
Total length:			22:18

== Accolades ==
Award	Category	Result	Ref(s)
Canada International Film Festival	Excellent in Interactive Feature	Won	
Festigios International Film Festival, Los Angeles	Best Narrative Feature	Won	
Los Angeles Independent Film Festival	Best Produced Screenplay	Won	
