= Ilahi Jamadar =

Marathi language poet from India (1946–2021)

- Born: 1 March 1946; Dudhgaon, Miraj, Sangli State
- Died: 31 January 2021 (aged 74); Dudhgaon, Maharashtra
- Occupations: Poet; lyricist; ghazalkar

Ilahi Jamadar (March 1, 1946 – 31 January 2021) was an Indian Marathi poet from Maharashtra, India. He was known for blending Urdu and Marathi verses in his ghazals.

== Career ==
Jamadar began writing poetry at the young age of 18. He soon became a disciple of noted poet Suresh Bhat. His ghazals often were an amalgamation of alternating Marathi and Urdu lines.

He was associated All India Radio where he presented work through various programs including YuvaWani (युववाणी), Marathi Sugam Sangeet (मराठी सुगम संगीत), SwarChitra (स्वरचित्र). He also presented his work on with Doordarshan in Arohi (आरोही). He conducted the Ilahi Ghazal Clinic training workshops for upcoming poets.

Jamadar organized ghazal mehfils called Jakhma asha Sugandhi, and Mahfil-e-Ilahi all over Maharashtra and even in Indore, Madhya Pradesh. His works were often presented by noted Ghazal singer Bhimrao Panchale.

=== Works ===
Jamadar wrote 25 poetry books and wrote hundreds of ghazals; many of which have been published over years in prominent newspapers, magazines in Marathi, Hindi and Urdu. His work also featured in TV shows and movies.

Jamadar translated Saint Kabir's Dohe in Marathi and wrote over 15,000 Doha couplets.

In Marathi his ghazal books/compilations included Ek Jamkham Sugandhi(एक जखम सुगंधी)/Jamkhama Asha Sugandhi (जखमा अशा सुगंधी), ShabdaSurachi BhavYatra (शब्दसुरांची भावयात्रा), Swapna Tarkanche (स्वप्न तारकांचे), Samgra Dohe Ilahiche, Bhavananchi Wadale (भावनांची वादळे). In Hindi, he wrote popular film songs as well as musicals. Hindi musicals included SwaptaSwar (सप्तस्वर), Maya aur Saya (माया और साया), Neer Kshir Vivek (नीर क्षीर विवेक). Swapna Miniche (स्वप्न मिनीचे) was a Marathi musical.

== Personal life ==
Jamadar was born on March 1, 1946, in a Muslim family in Dudhgaon village on the banks of Warana river in Miraj taluka, erstwhile Sangli State. He held a full-time job in Maharashtra Water Resources Regulatory Authority and chose voluntary retirement to focus on poetry.

After untimely death of his wife and son, Jamadar lived alone in a small dwelling in Yerawada neighborhood in Pune. He was favorite composer of noted music director Hridaynath Mangeshkar. Mangeshkar helped fund Jamadar's medical bills late in his life.

In July 2020, Jamadar suffered a fall injury and damage to his brain and was admitted to the Deenanath Mangeshkar Hospital in Pune. He suffered from Dementia. He died of prolonged illness on January 31, 2021 at the age of 74. He was buried in Dudhagaon in Sangli.
