= Bhimrao Panchale =

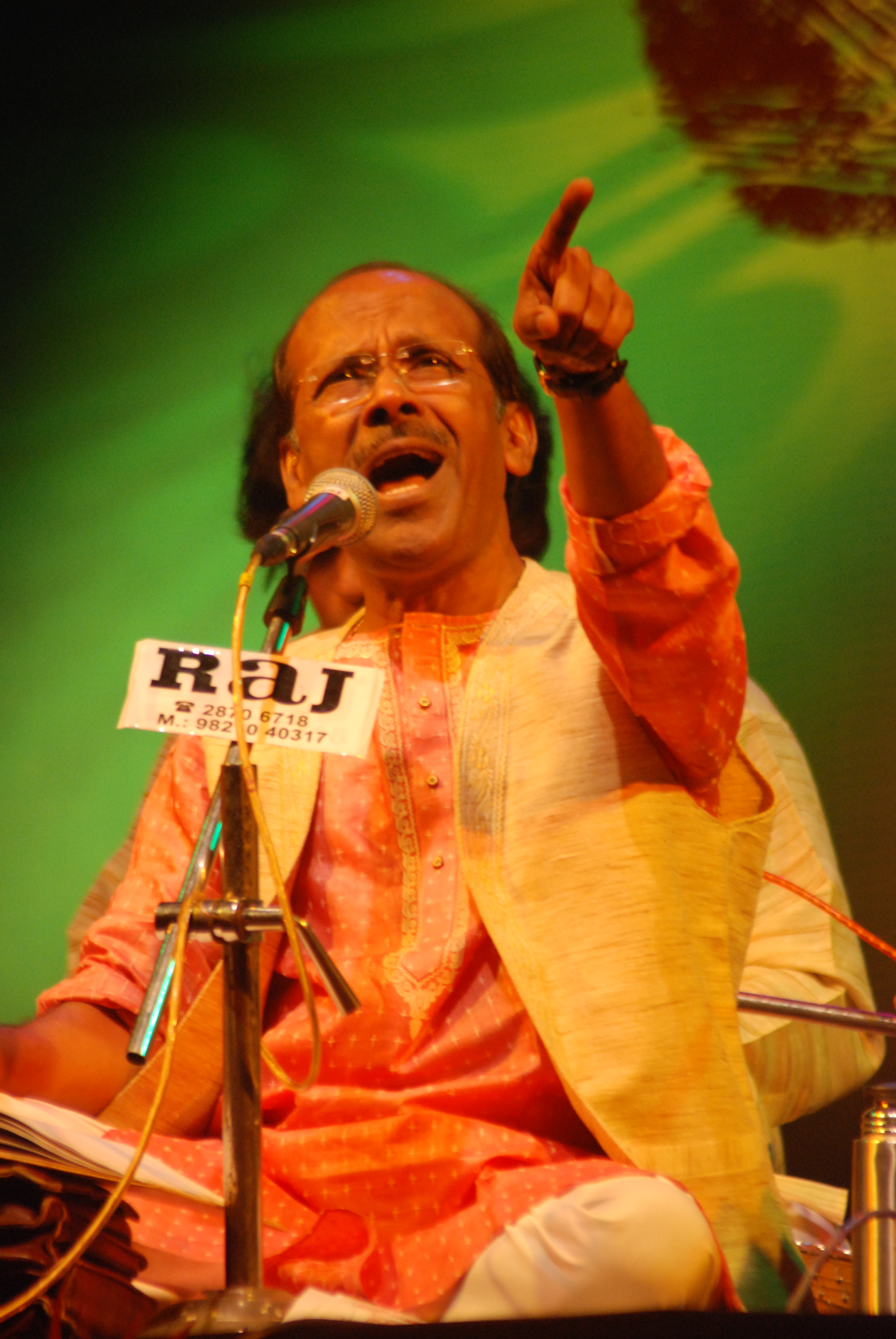
- Born: 30 March 1951 (age 75); Amravati, Maharashtra
- Occupations: Poet, lyricist, singer, composer
- Years active: 1972–present
- Children: 1

Bhimrao Panchale (born 30 March 1951) is a Marathi ghazal singer from the state of Maharashtra, India. He is known as Ghazal Nawaz (Prince of Ghazals) for his exposition of the ghazal and its adaptation to the Marathi language.

== Career ==
After completing 8 years of training Bhimrao performed Sugam Sangeet in different parts of Maharashtra. He later began singing Urdu ghazal. He also sang Marathi ghazal to large audiences by conducting various mehfil in Maharashtra.

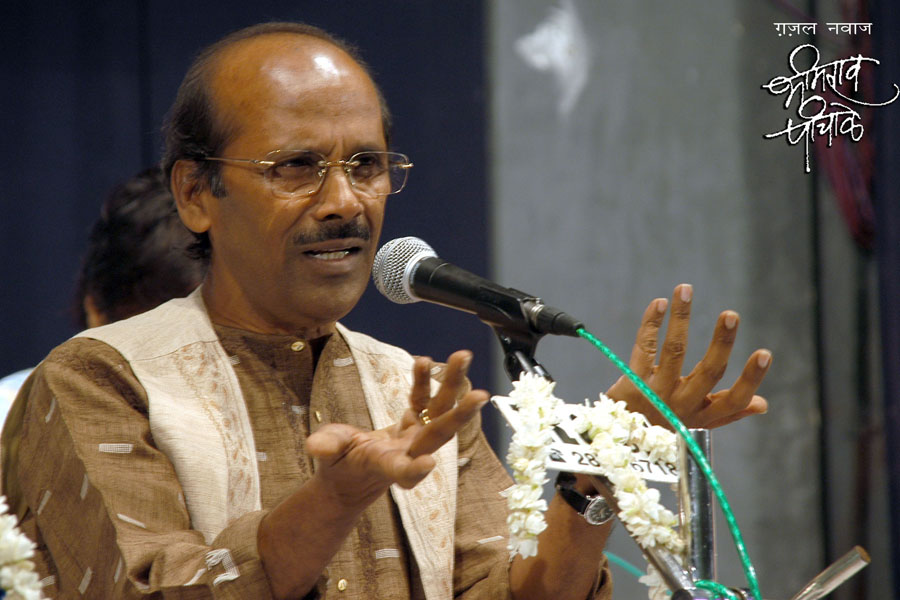
Bhimrao Panchale performing

Bhimrao gave his first concert in Marathi ghazal in 1972.

He was closely linked with Ghazalkar Ilahi Jamadar.

In 2011, a felicitation concert was held in Mumbai, on the occasion of 60th birthday.

Panchale has been awarded "Ekata kala Gaurav Puraskar" on 16 Jan 2016. and GaanSamradyni Lata Mangeshkar Award on 5 Aug 2025

Latest he performed A Gazal Evening at Old Maharashtra Sadan on 19.09.2026
