= Akshay Sanjay Indikar =

- Born: 16 May 1991 (age 35); India
- Occupations: Director, writer, editor, Cinematographer
- Notable work: Udaharnarth Nemade; Trijya - Radius; Sthalpuran - Chronicle of Space
- Spouse: Tejashri IK
- Children: Saau Indikar

Akshay Indikar is an Indian filmmaker, cinematographer, writer and editor from Solapur, belonging to the nomadic folk artist family from the state of Maharashtra, India.

== Early life and career ==
Born in Solapur and brought up in a small town called Akluj, Akshay Indikar completed his education in Pune. His first docu-fiction film was Udaharnarth Nemade. His debut feature film was Trijya -Radius. His second feature film Sthalpuran – Chronicle of Space premiered at the 70th Berlin International Film Festival in February 2020.

== Films ==
=== Doh ===
Doh is a Marathi short film directed by Akshay Indikar in 2014. It is 19 minutes long film that explores the disruption of a teenage girl's first intimate encounter by an unexpected outsider. Set against the backdrop of an otherwise uneventful day, the film delves into a layered emotional landscape that gradually unfolds. Through its narrative, the film examines how certain ingrained elements of the Indian psyche may influence not only those who act on desire but also those who observe it, suggesting a deeper psychological and cultural presence at play.

The film was selected in the competition section at the Seventh International Documentary and Short Film Festival of Kerala.

=== Udaharnarth Nemade ===
First Marathi docu-fiction film on the life and works of Jnanpith and Padma Shri recipient Marathi writer Bhalchandra Nemade.

=== Trijya – Radius ===
Akshay Indikar's second film Trijya - Radius is about a young poet Avdhut Kale and his struggle to find his place in a city like Pune. The film premiered at the Shanghai International Film Festival where it was nominated for the Asian New Talent Award for Best Cinematography, Best Director and Best Film. It was also screened at the 2019 Black Nights Film Festival in Tallinn, Estonia, Dhaka International Film Festival, Bangladesh where it won the Best Cinematography Award and the Black Film Festival, Geneva, Switzerland. "Trijya brings a sophisticated point of view as well as a sad aching to the hero's search for answers to the perennial questions about life's purpose. One can feel how personal a film it is to the 27-year-old director," wrote Deborah Young in The Hollywood Reporter.

=== Sthalpuran ===
His second feature film Sthalpuran – Chronicle of Space tells the story of an eight-year-old boy called Dighu who is finding it hard to adjust to life in his grandparents' village in Konkan, a rural region on the Indian coast. It premiered at the 70th Berlin International Film Festival in February 2020 where it was nominated for the prestigious Crystal Bear Award in Generation Kplus section. The film was included in the list of Top Ten Films screened at the festival curated by noted film Daniel Kasman for Mubi. Film Critic Bharadwaj Rangan in a review for Film Companion writes, "In Akshay Indikar's deeply felt portrait of a young boy, technique replaces traditional storytelling." This film is screening at Indian Film Festival of Los Angeles for closing night with Anurag Kashyap.
