= 2008 Cannes Film Festival =

- Official poster of the 61st Cannes Film Festival featuring a photo of model Anouk Marguerite and photographed by Pierre Collier.
- Opening film: Blindness
- Closing film: What Just Happened
- Location: Cannes, France
- Founded: 1946
- Awards: Palme d'Or: The Class
- Hosted by: Édouard Baer
- No. of films: 22 (Main Competition)
- Festival date: 14 May 2008 – 25 May 2008
- Website: festival-cannes.com/en

Cannes Film Festival
- 2009 2007

The 61st Annual Cannes Film Festival took place from 14 to 25 May 2008. American actor and filmmaker Sean Penn served as jury president for the main competition. French filmmaker Laurent Cantet won the Palme d'Or, the festival's top prize, for the drama film The Class.

The festival opened with Blindness by Fernando Meirelles and closed with What Just Happened by Barry Levinson. Édouard Baer was the master of ceremonies.

The British press reported the list of films in competition this year was notable for its absence of British films for the second successive year.

== Juries ==
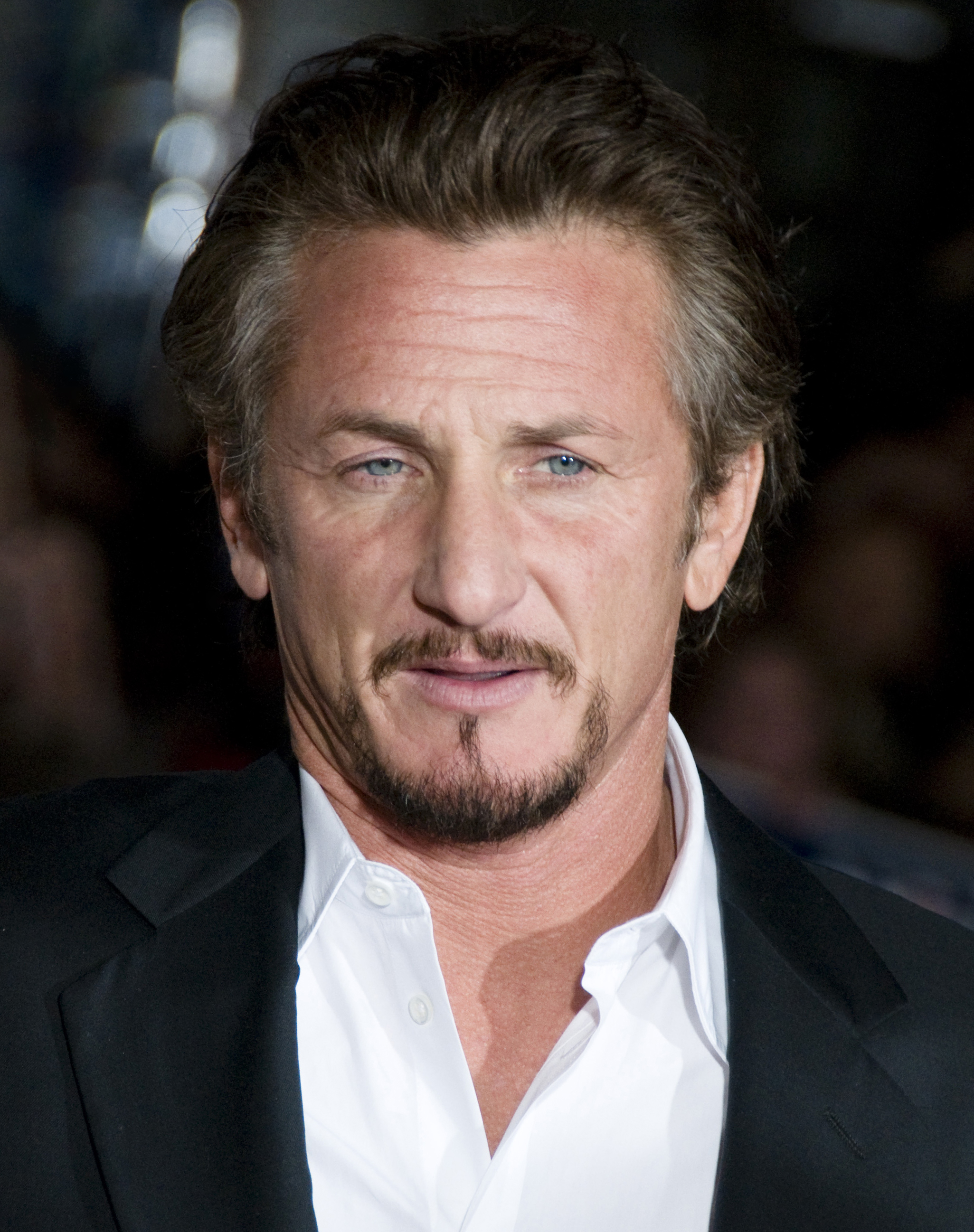
Sean Penn, President of the 2008 Feature film Jury

=== Main competition ===
- Sean Penn, American actor and director – Jury President
- Jeanne Balibar, French actress and singer
- Rachid Bouchareb, Franco-Algerian director
- Sergio Castellitto, Italian actor and director
- Alfonso Cuaron, Mexican filmmaker
- Alexandra Maria Lara, German-Romanian actress
- Natalie Portman, Israeli-American actress
- Marjane Satrapi, Iranian-French author and director
- Apichatpong Weerasethakul, Thai filmmaker

=== Un Certain Regard ===
- Fatih Akin, Turkish-German director – Jury President
- Anupama Chopra, Indian film critic and author
- Yasser Moheb, critic
- Yekaterina Mtsituridze, Russian journalist
- José Maria Prado, Spanish filmoteca manager

=== Cinefondation and Short Films Competition ===
- Hou Hsiao-hsien, Taiwanese filmmaker – Jury President
- Olivier Assayas, French filmmaker
- Susanne Bier, Danish filmmaker
- Marina Hands, French actress
- Laurence Kardish, American curator

=== Caméra d'Or ===
- Bruno Dumont, French filmmaker – Jury President
- Isabelle Danel, critic
- Jean-Michel Frodon, French critic
- Monique Kourdine, French member of the Fédération des Industries Tech
- Willy Kurant, Belgian cinematographer
- Jean Henri Roger, French director

== Official selection ==
=== In Competition ===
The following feature films competed for the Palme d'Or:

English Title	Original Title	Director(s)	Production Country
24 City	二十四城记/二十四城記	Jia Zhangke	China
Adoration		Atom Egoyan	Canada
Blindness (opening film)		Fernando Meirelles	Brazil, Canada, Japan
Changeling		Clint Eastwood	United States
Che (part I: The Argentine and part II: Guerilla)		Steven Soderbergh	Spain, Germany, France, United States
A Christmas Tale	Un conte de Noël	Arnaud Desplechin	France
The Class	Entre les murs	Laurent Cantet	France
Delta		Kornél Mundruczó	Hungary
Il Divo		Paolo Sorrentino	Italy
Frontier of the Dawn	La frontière de l'aube	Philippe Garrel	France
Gomorrah	Gomorra	Matteo Garrone	Italy
The Headless Woman	La mujer sin cabeza	Lucrecia Martel	Argentina, Spain, France, Italy
Lion's Den	Leonera	Pablo Trapero	Argentina, South Korea, Brazil, Spain
Linha de Passe		Walter Salles and Daniela Thomas	Brazil
My Magic		Eric Khoo	Singapore
Palermo Shooting		Wim Wenders	Germany, France, Italy
Service	Serbis	Brillante Mendoza	Philippines, France
Lorna's Silence	Le silence de Lorna	Jean-Pierre and Luc Dardenne	Belgium, Italy, Germany
Synecdoche, New York		Charlie Kaufman	United States
Three Monkeys	Üç Maymun	Nuri Bilge Ceylan	Turkey
Two Lovers		James Gray	United States
Waltz with Bashir	ואלס עם באשיר	Ari Folman	Israel, France

=== Un Certain Regard ===
The following films were selected for the competition of Un Certain Regard:

English Title	Original Title	Director(s)	Production Country
Afterschool		Antonio Campos	United States
Los Bastardos		Amat Escalante	Mexico, France, United States
Cloud 9	Wolke Neun	Andreas Dresen	Germany
The Dead Girl's Feast	A Festa da Menina Morta	Matheus Nachtergaele	Brazil
Hunger		Steve McQueen	Ireland, United Kingdom
Involuntary	De ofrivilliga	Ruben Östlund	Sweden
I Want to See	Je veux voir	Joana Hadjithomas and Khalil Joreige	France, Lebanon
Johnny Mad Dog		Jean-Stéphane Sauvaire	France, Belgium, Liberia
Modern Life	La Vie moderne	Raymond Depardon	France
Ocean Flame	一半海水，一半火燄	Fendou Liu	Hong Kong
O' Horten		Bent Hamer	Norway, France, Germany, Denmark
Parking	停車	Chung Mong-Hong	Taiwan
Salt of this Sea	ملح هذا البحر	Annemarie Jacir	Palestine, France, Israel, United States, Netherlands, Spain, Belgium, Switzerland
Soi Cowboy	ซอยคาวบอย	Thomas Clay	Thailand, United Kingdom
Tokyo!		Michel Gondry, Leos Carax and Bong Joon-ho	France, Japan, South Korea, Germany
Tokyo Sonata	トウキョウソナタ	Kiyoshi Kurosawa	Japan
Tulpan	Тюльпан	Sergey Dvortsevoy	Kazakhstan, Germany
Tyson		James Toback	United States
Versailles		Pierre Schoeller	France
Wendy and Lucy		Kelly Reichardt	United States

=== Out of Competition ===
The following films were selected to be screened out of competition:

English Title	Original Title	Director(s)	Production Country
The Chaser	추격자	Na Hong-jin	South Korea
The Good, the Bad, the Weird	좋은 놈, 나쁜 놈, 이상한 놈	Kim Jee-woon	South Korea
Indiana Jones and the Kingdom of the Crystal Skull		Steven Spielberg	United States
Kung Fu Panda		John Stevenson and Mark Osborne	United States
Maradona by Kusturica		Emir Kusturica	Serbia
Surveillance		Jennifer Lynch	United States
Vicky Cristina Barcelona		Woody Allen	Spain, United States
What Just Happened (closing film)		Barry Levinson	United States

=== Special Screenings ===
The following films were selected for the Special Screenings:

English Title	Original Title	Director(s)	Production Country
Ashes of Time Redux (1994)	東邪西毒	Wong Kar-wai	Hong Kong
C'est dur d'être aimé par des cons		Daniel Leconte	France
Chelsea on the Rocks		Abel Ferrara	United States
Of Time and the City		Terence Davies	United Kingdom
Roman Polanski: Wanted and Desired		Marina Zenovich	United States, United Kingdom
The Third Wave		Alison Thompson	United States, Sri Lanka
Wild Blood	Sanguepazzo	Marco Tullio Giordana	Italy, France

=== Cinéfondation ===
The following short films were selected for the competition of Cinéfondation:

- August 15th (Ba yue shi wu) by Jiang Xuan
- Blind Spot by Johanna Bessiere, Nicolas Chauvelot, Olivier Clert, Cécile Dubois Herry, Yvon Jardel, Simon Rouby
- El Reloj (The Watch) by Marco Berger
- Et dans mon coeur j'emporterai (And I’ll Keep in My Heart) by Yoon Sung-A
- Forbach by Claire Burger
- Gata by Diana Mkrtchyan
- Gestern In Eden (The Other Day In Eden) by Jan Speckenbach
- Himnon (Anthem) by Elad Keidan
- Illusion Dwellers by Robb Ellender
- Interior. Scara de Bloc (Interior. Bloc of Flats Hallway) by Ciprian Alexandrescu
- Kestomerkitsijät (Roadmarkers) by Juho Kuosmanen
- Naus by Lukás Glaser
- O som e o resto (Sound and the Rest) by André Lavaquial
- Shtika (Silence) by Hadar Morag
- Stop by Park Jae-Ok
- The Maid by Heidi Saman
- This Is a Story About Ted and Alice by Teressa Tunney

=== Short Films Competition ===
The following short films competed for the Short Film Palme d'Or:

- 411-Z by Daniel Erdélyi
- Buen Viaje by Javier Palleiro
- De moins en moins by Mélanie Laurent (France)
- El Deseo by Marie Benito
- Jerrycan by Julius Avery
- Love You More by Sam Taylor-Wood
- Megatron] by Marian Crişan
- My Rabbit Hoppy by Anthony Lucas
- Smafuglar by Rúnar Rúnarsson

=== Cannes Classics ===
The following films were selected for the Cannes Classics section:

English Title	Original Title	Director(s)	Production Country
Restored prints
13 jours en France (1968)		Claude Lelouch and François Reichenbach	France
24 Hours in the Life of a Woman (1968)	24 heures de la vie d'une femme	Dominique Delouche	France, West Germany
Anna Karenina (1967)	Анна Каренина	Aleksandr Zarkhi	Soviet Union
The Big Snooze (short) (1946)		Bob Clampett	United States
Birds Anonymous (short) (1957)		Friz Freleng	United States
Blazing Saddles (1974)		Mel Brooks	United States
Bonnie and Clyde (1967)		Arthur Penn	United States
Book Revue (short) (1946)		Bob Clampett	United States
Captain Blood (1935)		Michael Curtiz	United States
Dirty Harry (1971)		Don Siegel	United States
Dry Summer (1964)	Susuz Yaz	Metin Erksan	Turkey
Duck Amuck (short) (1953)		Chuck Jones	United States
The Effect of Gamma Rays on Man-in-the-Moon Marigolds (1972)		Paul Newman	United States
Enter the Dragon (1973)	龍爭虎鬥	Robert Clouse	Hong Kong, United States
Fingers (1978)		James Toback	United States
Gamperaliya (1963)	ගම්පෙරලිය	Lester James Peries	Sri Lanka
Guide (1965)		Vijay Anand	India, United States
Holy Blood (1989)	Santa Sangre	Alejandro Jodorowsky	Mexico, Italy
The Housemaid (1960)	하녀	Kim Ki-young	South Korea
I Am a Fugitive from a Chain Gang (1932)		Mervyn LeRoy	United States
I Love to Singa (short) (1936)		Tex Avery	United States
Interviews with My Lai Veterans (short) (1970)		Joseph Strick	United States
The Invisible Man (1933)		James Whale	United States
Let's Get Lost (1989)		Bruce Weber	United States
Lola Montès (1955)		Max Ophüls	France, West Germany
The Long Day's Dying (1968)		Peter Collinson	United Kingdom
The Matrix (1999)		Lana and Lilly Wachowski	United States, Australia
One Froggy Evening (short) (1955)		Chuck Jones	United States
Orpheus (1950)	Orphée	Jean Cocteau	France
The Passionate Friends (1949)		David Lean	United Kingdom
Peppermint Frappé (1967)		Carlos Saura	Spain
Porky in Wackyland (short) (1938)		Bob Clampett	United States
Rabbit of Seville (short) (1950)		Chuck Jones	United States
The Savage Eye (1960)		Ben Maddow, Sidney Meyers and Joseph Strick	United States
This Happy Breed (1944)		David Lean	United Kingdom
Touki Bouki (1973)		Djibril Diop Mambéty	Senegal
What Ever Happened to Baby Jane? (1962)		Robert Aldrich	United States
What's Opera, Doc? (short) (1957)		Chuck Jones	United States
What's Up Doc? (1972)		Peter Bogdanovich	United States
Zigeunerweisen (1980)	ツィゴイネルワイゼン	Seijun Suzuki	Japan
Tributes
Labor on the Douro Rive (short) (1931)	Douro, Faina Fluvial	Manoel de Oliveira	Portugal
Documentaries about Cinema
La Collection Cinéma cinémas		Claude Ventura	France
Il était une fois...Lawrence d'Arabie		Anne Kunvari	France
The Mystery of Samba	O Mistério do Samba	Carolina Jabor and Lula Buarque De Hollanda	Brazil
No Subtitles Necessary: Laszlo & Vilmos		James Chressanthis	United States

== Parallel sections ==
=== Critics' Week ===
The following films were screened for the 47th International Critics' Week (47e Semaine de la Critique):

English Title	Original Title	Director(s)	Production Country
In Competition
Better Things		Duane Hopkins	United Kingdom
Blood Appears	La Sangre brota	Pablo Fendrik	Argentina, France, Germany
Everybody Dies but Me	Все умрут, а я останусь	Valeriya Gai Germanika	Russia
Grown Ups	Les Grandes personnes	Anna Novion	France, Sweden
Moscow, Belgium	Aanrijding in Moscou	Christophe Van Rompaey	Belgium
Snow	Snijeg	Aida Begić	Bosnia and Herzegovina, Germany, France, Iran
The Stranger in Me	Das Fremde in mir	Emily Atef	Germany
Short Films Competition
A espera		Fernanda Teixeira	Brazil
Ahendu nde sapukai		Pablo Lamar	Argentina, Paraguay
La Copie de Coralie		Nicolas Engel	France
Ergo		Géza M. Tóth	Hungary
Next Floor		Denis Villeneuve	Canada
Nosebleed		Jeff Vespa	United States
Skhizein		Jérémy Clapin	France
Special Screenings
The Desert Within	Desierto adentro	Rodrigo Plá	Mexico
The End of Poverty?		Philippe Diaz	United States
Enfants de Don Quichotte (Acte 1)		Ronan Dénécé, Augustin Legrand and Jean-Baptiste Legrand	France
Home		Ursula Meier	Switzerland, France, Belgium
Rumba		Dominique Abel and Fiona Gordon	France, Belgium
Shiva	שבעה	Ronit Elkabetz and Shlomi Elkabetz	Israel, France
Special Screenings – Short Films
Beyond the Mexique Bay		Jean-Marc Rousseau Ruiz	France, Mexico
L’ondée		David Coquard-Dassault	France, Canada
The Ylang Ylang Residence	La Résidence Ylang Ylang	Hachimiya Ahamada	Comoros, France
Sand	Areia	Caetano Gotardo	Brazil
Prix de la Critique
Les Filles de feu		Jean-Sébastien Chauvin	France
Graffiti		Vano Burduli	Georgia
Les Paradis Perdus		Hélier Cisterne	France
A Relationship in Four Days		Peter Glanz	United States
Taxi Wala		Lola Frederich	France
Young Man Falling	Ung and falder	Martin de Thurah	Denmark

=== Directors' Fortnight ===
The following films were screened for the 2008 Directors' Fortnight (Quinzaine des Réalizateurs):

English Title	Original Title	Director(s)	Production Country
Acne	Acné	Federico Veiroj	Uruguay, Argentina, Mexico, Spain
Boogie		Radu Muntean	Romania
Birdsong	El cant dels ocells	Albert Serra	Spain
Blind Loves	Slepe lásky	Juraj Lehotský	Slovakia
Four Nights with Anna (opening film)	Cztery noce z Anną	Jerzy Skolimowski	Poland, France
Dernier maquis	Adhen	Rabah Ameur-Zaïmeche	Algeria, France
Eldorado		Bouli Lanners	Belgium
God's Offices	Les Bureaux de Dieu	Claire Simon	France
Knitting	牛郎织女	Yin Lichuan	China
Liverpool		Lisandro Alonso	Argentina, France, Netherlands, Germany, Spain
Lonely Tunes of Tehran	Taraneh Tanhaïye Tehran	Saman Salur	Iran
Monsieur Morimoto		Nicola Sornaga	France
Now Showing		Raya Martin	Philippines, France
On War	De la guerre	Bertrand Bonello	France
Our Beloved Month of August	Aquele Querido Mês de Agosto	Miguel Gomes	Portugal
The Pleasure of Being Robbed		Josh Safdie	United States
Private Lessons	Élève libre	Joachim Lafosse	Belgium, France
The Rest of the Night	Il Resto della notte	Francesco Munzi	Italy
Salamandra		Pablo Agüero	Argentina
Shultes	Шультес	Bakur Bakuradze	Russia
Tony Manero		Pablo Larraín	Chile
Le Voyage aux Pyrénées		Arnaud and Jean-Marie Larrieu	France

Special screenings

- 40X15 by Olivier Jahan
- Itinéraire de Jean Bricard by Danièle Huillet, Jean-Marie Straub (40 min)
- Le Genou d’Artemide by Jean-Marie Straub (26 min)
- Milestones (Reprise) by John Douglas, Robert Kramer

Short films

- The Acquaintances of a Lonely John by Benny Safdie
- Ciel éteint! by F. J. Ossang
- Easter Morning by Bruce Conner
- Il fait beau dans la plus belle ville du monde by Valérie Donzelli
- Je vous hais petites filles by Yann Gonzalez
- Kamel s’est suicidé six fois, son père est mort by Soufiane Adel
- MAN by Myna Joseph
- Mes copains by Louis Garrel
- Muro by Tião
- Sagan om den lille Dockpojken by Johannes Nyholm
- Summer Afternoon by Wi-ding Ho
- Vsakdan ni vsak dan by Martin Turk

== Official Awards ==
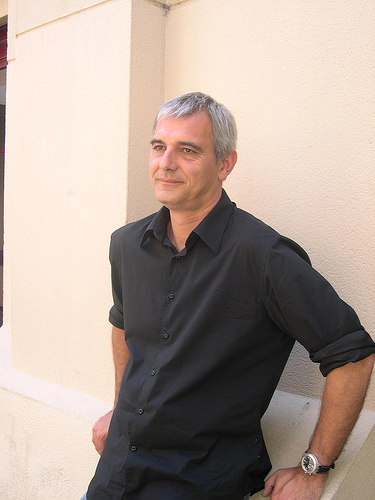
Laurent Cantet, winner of the 2008 Palme d'Or

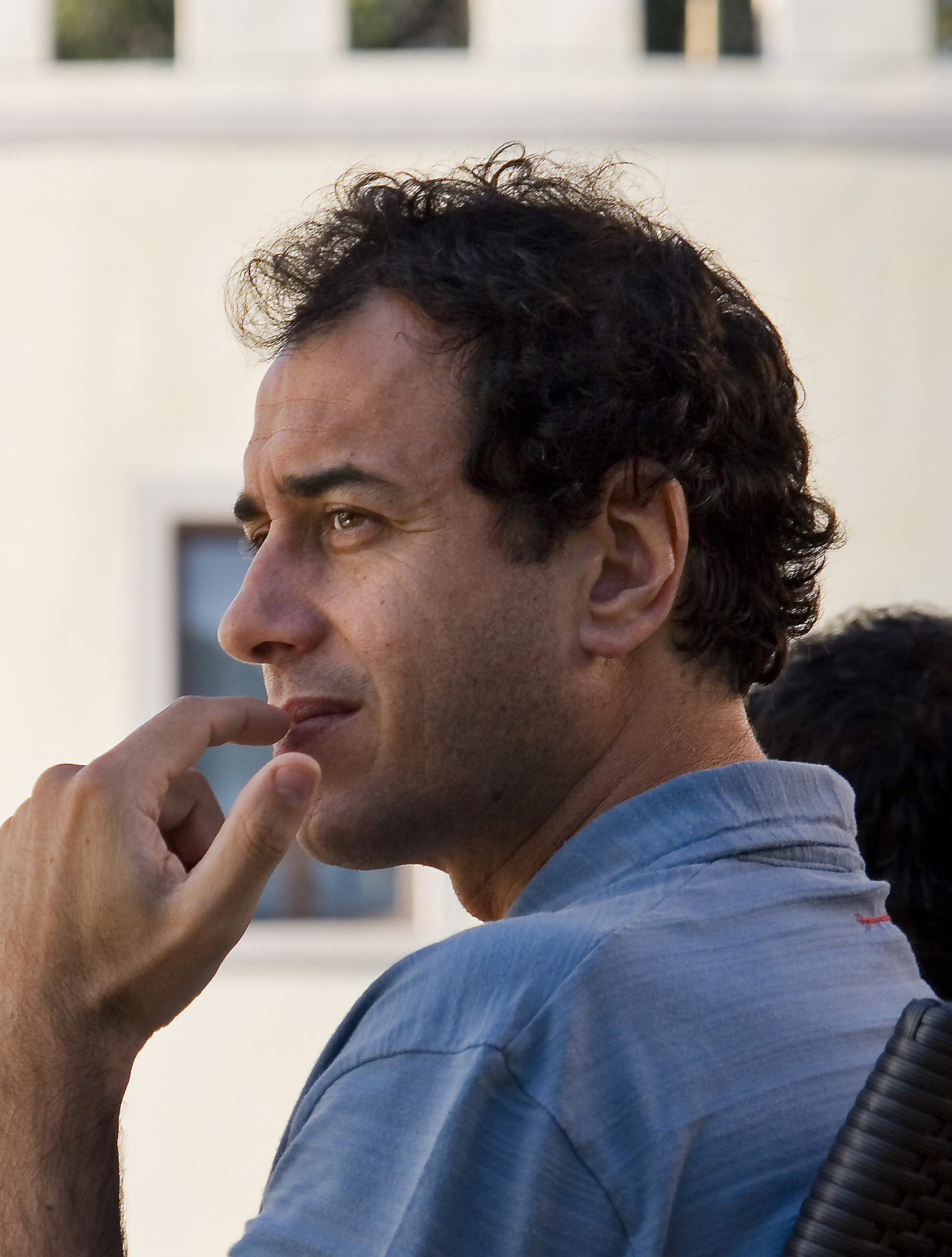
Matteo Garrone, winner of the 2008 Grand Prix

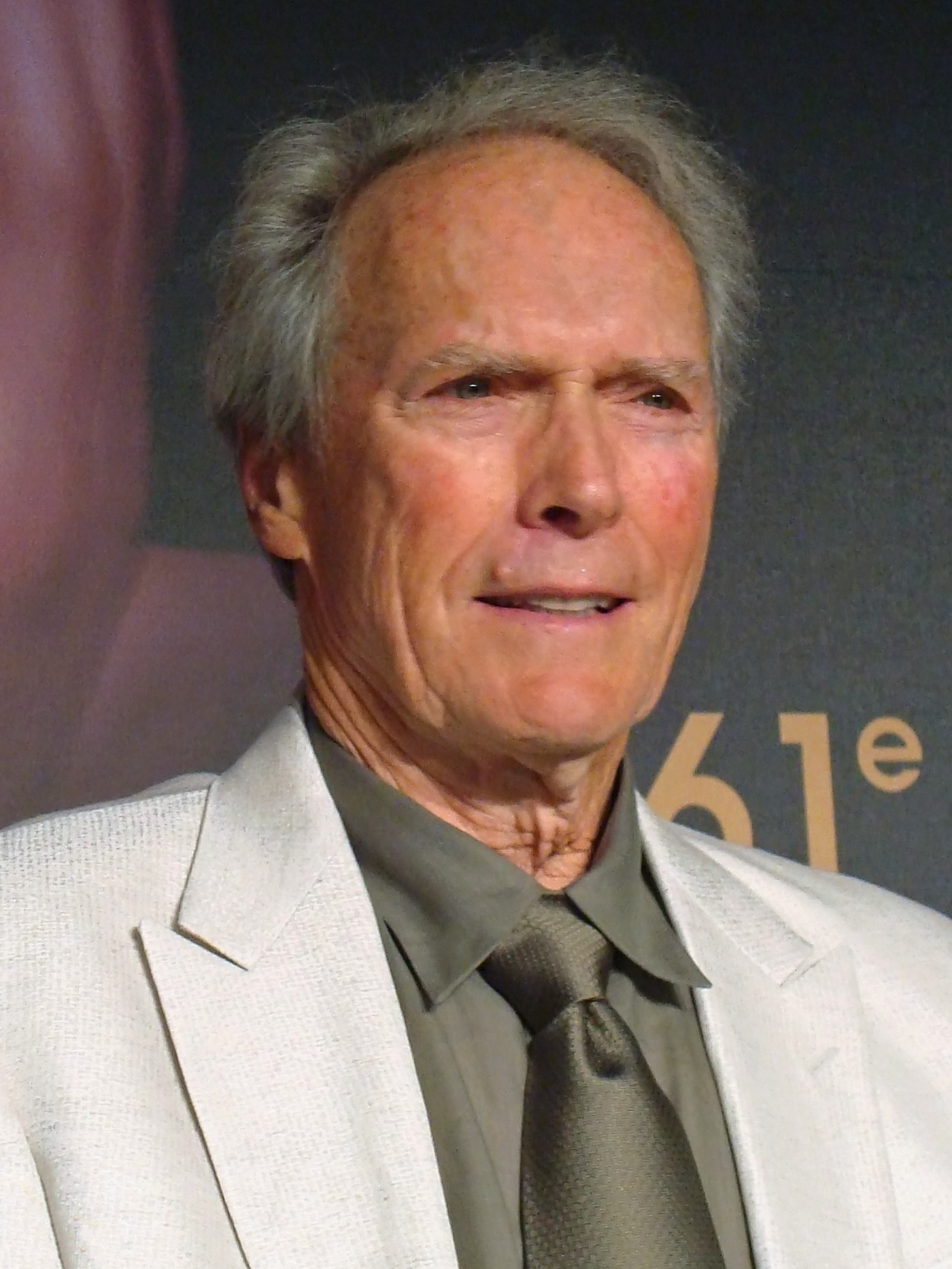
Director Clint Eastwood at the festival promoting Changeling

=== In Competition ===
The following films and people received the 2008 Official selection awards:

- Palme d'Or: The Class by Laurent Cantet
- Grand Prix: Gomorra by Matteo Garrone
- Best Director: Nuri Bilge Ceylan for Three Monkeys
- Best Screenplay: Luc and Jean-Pierre Dardenne for Lorna's Silence
- Best Actress: Sandra Corveloni in Linha de Passe
- Best Actor: Benicio del Toro in Che
- Jury Prize: Paolo Sorrentino for Il Divo
- Special Prize of the Festival:
  - Catherine Deneuve
  - Clint Eastwood

=== Un Certain Regard ===
- Prix Un Certain Regard: Tulpan by Sergey Dvortsevoy
- Un Certain Regard Special Jury Prize: Tokyo Sonata by Kiyoshi Kurosawa
- Heart Throb Jury Prize: Cloud 9 by Andreas Dresen
- Knockout Prize: Tyson by James Toback
- Prize of Hope: Johnny Mad Dog by Jean-Stéphane Sauvaire

=== Cinéfondation ===
- First Prize: Himnon by Elad Keidan
- Second Prize: Forbach by Claire Burger
- Third Prize:
  - Stop by Park Jae-Ok
  - Roadmarkers by Juho Kuosmanen

=== Caméra d'Or ===
- Hunger by Steve McQueen
  - Special mention: Everybody Dies But Me by Valeriya Gai Germanika

=== Short Films Competition ===
- Short Film Palme d'Or: Megatron by Marian Crişan
- Jury Prize: Jerrycan by Julius Avery

== Independent Awards ==
=== FIPRESCI Prizes ===
- Hunger by Steve McQueen (Un Certain Regard)
- Eldorado by Bouli Lanners (Directors' Fortnight)
- Delta by Kornél Mundruczó (In competition)

=== Vulcan Award of the Technical Artist ===
- Luca Bigazzi (cinematographer) and Angelo Raguseo (sound mixer) for Il Divo by Paolo Sorrentino

=== Prize of the Ecumenical Jury ===
- Adoration by Atom Egoyan

=== International Critics' Week ===
- Critics Week Grand Prize: Snow by Aida Begić
- SACD Award: Moscow, Belgium by Christophe Van Rompaey
- ACID/CCAS Award: Moscow, Belgium by Christophe Van Rompaey
- OFAJ/TV5MONDE Young Critics Award: Blood Appears by Pablo Fendrik
- Canal+ Gran Prix for short film: Next Floor by Denis Villeneuve
- Kodak Discovery Award for Best Short Film: Skhizein by Jérémy Clapin

=== Regards Jeunes Prize ===
- Everybody Dies But Me by Valeriya Gai Germanika

=== Prix François Chalais ===
- Wild Blood by Marco Tullio Giordana
