= Dudinskaya =

Dudinskaya may refer to:

- Asteroid 8470 Dudinskaya
- Feminine form of the surname Dudinsky
