= Progress and Poverty Institute =

The Progress and Poverty Institute
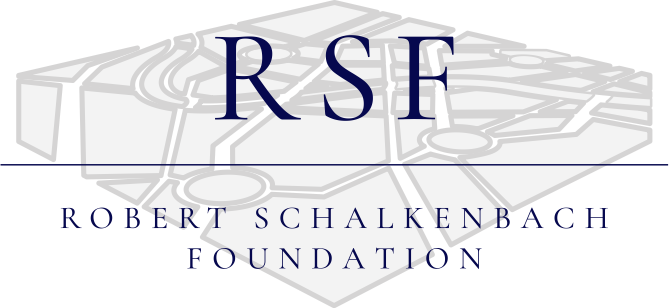
- Founded: 1925
- Founder: Robert Schalkenbach
- Type: 501(c)(3)
- Purpose: Social and economic justice
- Location: Princeton, New Jersey - United States
- Revenue: $922,853 in 2018
- Endowment: $17,876,695 in 2018
- Website: schalkenbach.org

The Progress and Poverty Institute, founded in 1925 as the Robert Schalkenbach Foundation, is a private operating foundation dedicated to the social and economic philosophy of Henry George through publication and research. Among its activities, the Institute publishes The American Journal of Economics and Sociology, funds the Henry George Chair in Economics at St. John's University, and supports the Henry George Lecture Series at the University of Scranton.

== History ==
The organization was founded in 1925 to promote public awareness of the social and economic philosophy of Henry George and keep his works in print. It is the oldest Georgist organization in existence, and actively supports Georgist ideas such as land value taxation, as well as carbon pricing, zoning reform, community land trusts and universal basic income.

== Activities ==
The institute, in partnership with Wiley Publishing, sponsors The American Journal of Economics and Sociology. Founding editor Will Lissner, who served from 1941 to 1989, was assisted for many years by Dorothy Burnham Lissner. Subsequent editors-in-chief include Frank C. Genovese, Laurence S. Moss (1997–2009), Clifford W. Cobb, and Richard H. Cebula (2022-).

In 1986, the Institute funded the Henry George Chair in Economics at The Peter J. Tobin College of Business of St. John's University. Holders of the named chair include Northrup Buechner (1981–1991), Joseph A. Giacallone (1991–2019) and Aleksandr V. Gevorkyan (2019-).

The Society also supports the Henry George Lecture Series, a public lecture series on economics held annually since 1986 at the University of Scranton. A number of lecturers from the series have subsequently won the Nobel Prize.

The Progress and Poverty Institute, along with the Center for the Study of Economics, co-sponsors the Center for Property Tax Reform (CPTR), a nonprofit for research into property taxes.

== Leadership ==
The organization's executive director is Josie Faass. Past directors have included economists Mason Gaffney and Nicolaus Tideman.

== Funding ==
As of 2021 the Institute receives grants from the Francis Neilson Trust Fund. It holds approximately $18 million in assets.

== Publications ==
=== Books ===
- Progress and Poverty by Henry George
- Social Statics, or The Conditions essential to Happiness specified, and the First of them Developed by Herbert Spencer
- Land title origins, a tale of force and fraud by Alfred Noblit Chandler
- Protection or Free Trade by Henry George
- Crumbling Foundations: how faulty institutions create world poverty by David Smiley
- Rent as Public Revenue: Issues and Methods by Lindy Davies, Gilbert Herman, et al.
- Democracy Versus Socialism: A Critical Examination of Socialism as a Remedy for Social Injustice and an Exposition of the Single Tax Doctrine by Max Hirsch
- Why Global Poverty?: A Companion Guide to the Film The End of Poverty? by Clifford Cobb
- New Life In Old Cities by Mason Gaffney
- The Science of Political Economy by Henry George

=== Journals ===
- Sponsor of The American Journal of Economics and Sociology

=== Film ===
- The End of Poverty?
