= How the Other Half Lives (disambiguation) =

How the Other Half Lives is an 1890 book by Jacob Riis.

How the Other Half Lives may also refer to:

- "How the Other Half Lives", a song from the 2002 stage musical Thoroughly Modern Millie
- How the Other Half Live, a 2009–10 British documentary series
- Eamonn & Ruth: How the Other Half Lives, a 2015–19 British documentary series
- How the Other Half Lives (Friday Night Lights), an episode of the TV series Friday Night Lights
- How the Other Half Lives (Roswell), an episode of the TV series Roswell

== See also ==
- How the Other Half Dies, a 1976 book by Susan George
- How the Other Half Loves, a 1969 play by Alan Ayckbourn
- How the Other Half Banks, a 2015 book by Mehrsa Baradaran
- How the Other Half Live and Die, a 2016 album by Cold, Cold Heart
