= Dudinsky =

Dudinsky (Russian: Дудинский), feminine: Dudinskaya is a Russian surname; Ukrainian: Дудинський, romanized: Dudynskyi, Belarusian: Дудзінскі, romanized: Dudzinski. Notable people with the surname include:

- Igor Dudinsky, Soviet and Russian journalist, writer, art critic, and visual artist
- Natalia Dudinskaya (1912–2003), Soviet and Russian prima ballerina
- Vlsdimir Dudinsky (1861–1938), Russian statesman
- Mikhail Dudinsky (1822-1899), Russian military commander, infantry general
- Valeriya Dudinskaya, birth name of Valeriya Gai Germanika, Russian film director
