= How the Other Half Dies =

1976 book by Susan George

1976 edition

How the Other Half Dies: The Real Reasons for World Hunger is a book by Franco-American activist Susan George, a member of the Transnational Institute. It was originally published in 1976, not long after the World Food Conference, and has been reprinted several times since.

In the book, George examines and disputes two popular ideas: first, that there is not enough food, and second, that the world is overpopulated. She argues that the planet could easily feed its present population and many more. She also insists that the problem is not climate change and that food technology will not provide the solution. George instead believes that the problem is that the world food supply is controlled by the wealthy elite and that the poor have no say in the unfair trade that roots out local farmers, who are replaced with foreign agribusinesses to grow profitable cash crops for the West, creating economic, agricultural, and hunger crises in the third world.

The title is a reference to Jacob Riis's book How the Other Half Lives.

In the academic journal Political Studies and International Relationships the book is referenced in the following way: . The various projects for reform in religion, education, economics and politics had to necessarily concern themselves with the extent to which certain aspirations of the poor for some improved standard of living and education were capable of being satisfied consistent with the moral and intellectual capacities of the poor and with the preservation of order. The study does not transform our understanding of the issue and one misses the interplay of intellectual and social history found in such works as that of Norman Hampson but it certainly deepens our knowledge of an important element in the political, economic and religious ideas of the Enlightenment seeing them in terms both of social reform and social control.

In the Journal article: Review Politics of Hunger Three points which Susan George makes in her introduction which pose the problem and assert the outlook and ideology of the author are worth emphasising: (a) "This book is about people, that is, about the political and economic forces that shape their lives and determine how much and how well they will eat.... Their condition is not inevitable but is caused by identifiable forces within the. province of rational, human control." (b) Most, of the proposed solutions to; the "food crises" have tended to be "purely technological", stressing production rather than equitable distribution of food.... Further, "the only point every one [of these solutions] seems to agree upon is that matters are bound to grow worse". (c) Food is being utilised as a source of profit and as a tool for economic and political control and a weapon in international diplomacy; the increasing grain shortages. could give "Washington... virtual life and death power over the fate of the multitudes of the needy". Further, forums such as the World Bank, FAO and other agencies of the UN are being used to further the interests of those who want to use food as a political weapon. Part I of Susan George's deals with the availability of food in relation to the world population and the major transformation which has taken place in agriculture. "Agriculture as practiced in the US today is hardly 'agricultural at all - it is rather a highly sophisticated,- highly energy-intensive system for transforming one series of industrial products into another series of industrial products which happen to) be edible". In this process, the processors maximise their profits up to the level of 90 per cent.

The review by J.E.B exposes that The role of affluent nations in the world hunger crisis is analyzed in this thought-provoking book. The author argues that unequal distribution of power and resources is the cause of famine and hunger, and critically examines such "solutions" to the crisis as population control, transfer of technology, and the Green Revolution.

The book is also referenced in The Jacob A. Riis Collection: Photographs for Books and Lantern Lectures: Bandit’s Roost appeared in Riis’ 1890 book, How the Other Half Lives, as a full-page halftone illustration made from the left half of the stereographic negative. That Riis used both halves of the negative – the right features a menacing “bandit” at the right edge of the composition and the left features a woman with two small children at the left edge – suggests that Riis did not prefer one to the other. In 1890, halftone technology was in its infancy, and the illustration of Bandit’s Roost, which is approximately the size of an index card, is crude and fuzzy. Its unimpressive appearance may explain why the photographs in Riis’ controversial book were hardly mentioned by reviewers. Jacob Riis, Richard Hoe Lawrence and Henry G. Piffard, Bandit’s Roost, hand-coloured lantern slide. The Jacob A. Riis Collection: Photographs for Books and Lantern Lectures
