= Susan George (political scientist) =

American-French political and social scientist, activist and writer (1934–2026)

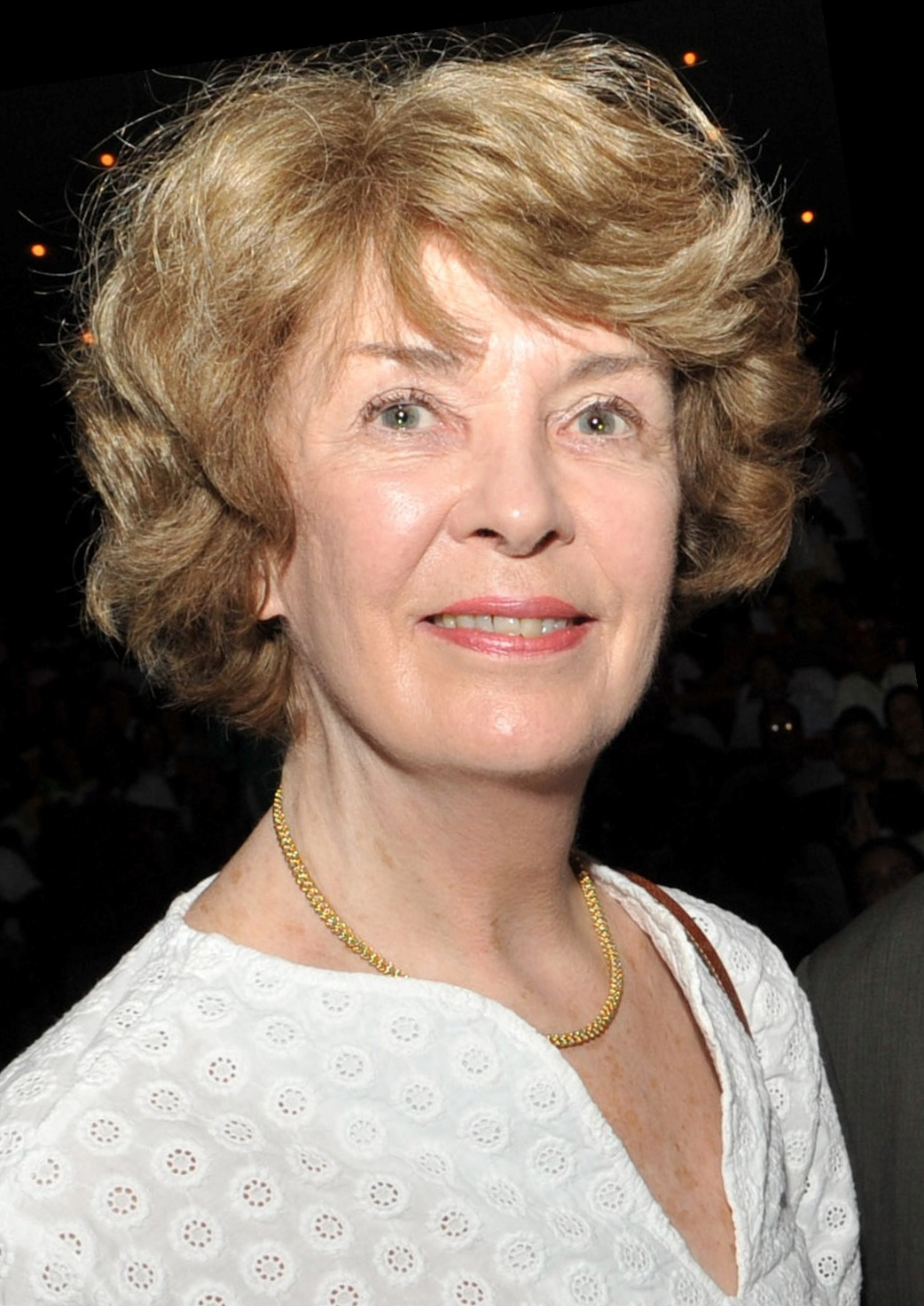
- George in 2010
- Born: Susan Vance Akers; June 29, 1934; Akron, Ohio, U.S.
- Died: February 14, 2026 (aged 91)
- Spouse: Charles-Henry George

Education
- Education: Smith College (BA); University of Paris (BA, PhD)

Susan George (June 29, 1934 – February 14, 2026) was an American and French political and social scientist, activist and writer on global social justice, Third World poverty, underdevelopment and debt. She was the president of the Transnational Institute, a think-tank located in Amsterdam. She was a fierce critic of the present policies of the International Monetary Fund (IMF), World Bank (IBRD) and what she called their 'maldevelopment model'. She similarly criticized the structural reform policies of the Washington Consensus on Third World development. She was of U.S. birth but resided in France, and had dual citizenship since 1994.

== Early life ==
Born Susan Vance Akers on June 29, 1934, in Akron, Ohio, the only child of Edith and Walter Akers, Episcopalians who could trace their residency in the United States back to 1632. Her father was an insurance broker, and her mother was a homemaker and a member of the Junior League. Born during the Great Depression, she was raised in a privileged environment; she had a nursemaid and took dance classes, music lessons, and, at a YMCA, swimming lessons.

After attending a public, co-educational primary school, she went on to enroll at all-girls private preparatory academy. She stated that single-sex schooling "made me not a feminist. It was normal that women do whatever anybody did. Women were the sports experts. Women were the brains. You weren't in competition with men. You weren't expected to shut up—on the contrary! Even in my era, I never felt that I was particularly put down as a woman ever." George's father encouraged all her interests, including those outside the realm of traditional femininity, such as science and baseball, and when he went to serve in World War II, George assisted in planting a victory garden.

== Academic career ==
As a young student, George developed an interest in the French language and French culture. As a teenager she chose to attend Smith College, with the desire to study abroad in France. While studying abroad, she took courses at Sciences Po. She attained her bachelor's degree from Smith College in French and philosophy. George later attended the University of Paris, the Sorbonne, attaining a license, a three-year degree, in philosophy, later earning her doctorate in political science from the same university.

== Career ==
=== Early anti-war activism ===
George became a political activist in response to France's war in Algeria and U.S. involvement in Vietnam. George said that the Vietnam War "was this sort of gateway to understanding what America could be, which is to say something quite negative, which I had not understood at all when I lived there. I had accepted the usual propaganda." In 1967, she joined the Paris-American Committee to Stop War (P.A.C.S.), and became assistant to the director of an NGO, the American Centre for Students and Artists, in 1969. This sparked the interest of the CIA, who had already been looking into P.A.C.S. In 1971 she began working with the Front Solidarite Indochine, a group that organized antiwar lectures and protests in France. Shortly after, P.A.C.S. was dismantled by the French government. She then collaborated with the directors of the Institute for Policy Studies in Washington, D.C., to form a new NGO devoted to social justice, which, in 1973, became the Transnational Institute .

=== Anti-hunger activism ===
In 1974 she attended the World Food Conference in Rome, but was disillusioned due to her feeling that agribusiness representatives dominated the proceedings, saying in an interview that "no one who counted took the real reasons for hunger—power and control in the wrong hands—into account." In 1976, her first book was published: How the Other Half Dies: The Real Reasons for World Hunger. In 1984, she helped in organizing the World Food Assembly, a meeting held in Rome.

=== Organizational involvement ===
From 1990 to 1995 she served on the board of conservation group Greenpeace International, as well as that of Greenpeace France. George opposed the OECD's proposed Multilateral Agreement on Investment (MAI) in the 1990s, and the ill-fated "Millennium Round" objectives of the World Trade Organization at Seattle in 1999. From 1999 to 2006 she was vice-president of ATTAC France (Association for Taxation of (financial) Transactions to Aid Citizens) and remains a member of the scientific council. She was awarded the title of honorary president in 2008.

George was involved with the World Social Forum since its inception in 2000, and the spin-off European Social Forum. Though she was critical of the forums' initial structure, and believed that more action outside of forums was needed to bring about change, she applauded the steps they made towards changing "the political landscape".

In 2004, she supported John Kerry for president. She canvassed for Kerry in Pennsylvania, but wrote for in a piece for OpenDemocracy "we all thought [Kerry] had a very good chance, even though everyone admitted it was hard to get really enthusiastic about him.... The man isn't the most charismatic ever to walk the earth. But at least he's not a proto-fascist or a go-it-aloner, and that's what we seem—apart from a last-minute miracle—to be stuck with now. With four years clear ahead of him and no re-election to worry about, I fear Bush and the ghastly neo- con/neo-liberals around him will now go on the rampage. They can continue with impunity their attacks on the Constitution and on hard-won freedoms...".

Throughout the latter half of the 2000s, George continued making appearances, such as partaking in the 2006 Table of Free Voices conference, and appearing in the 2008 documentary film, The End of Poverty?.

George was the honorary president of ATTAC France.

== Personal life and death ==
During her time abroad in France, she met French lawyer, Charles-Henry George, 12 years her senior, and later moved to France to marry him in 1956. Quoted about her early years in France she said she felt homesick "for my women friends, probably, but not for America, per se. I'd made my choice." The couple soon started a family. Susan George obtained her French citizenship in 1994.

George's children and grandchildren further inspired her activism, saying in an interview "Either we achieve together a new level of human emancipation, and do so in a way that preserves the earth, or we shall leave behind us the worst future for our children that capitalism and nature can deal them. No one knows in which direction the balance will tip nor does anyone know which actions, which writings, which alliances may achieve the critical mass that leads us one way or another, backwards or forwards. I am acutely conscious of the precariousness of our moment and my four much-loved grandchildren give me added resolve to address it."

== Death ==
George died on February 14, 2026, at the age of 91. Her husband, Charles-Henry George, had died at their country home in France in 2002. She was survived by her three children (Valerie, Michel, and Stephanie), and seven grandchildren.

== Honors ==
- Honorary president ATTAC
- Mentioned as honorary advisor of The Other Economic Summit

== Bibliography ==
- How the Other Half Dies: The Real Reasons for World Hunger (Penguin), 1976. Reprinted 1986, 1991; ISBN 0-14-013569-3 (An analysis of the real reasons for world hunger.)
- Ill Fares the Land (Penguin); 1984. Revised and expanded 1990 ISBN 0-14-012790-9. (Essays on food, hunger and power.)
- A Fate Worse Than Debt (Penguin), 1988; ISBN 0-14-022789-X (An analysis of the reasons for Third World debt.)
- The Debt Boomerang (Pluto Press), 1992; ISBN 0-7453-0594-6 (Continuing the theme of Third World debt and its harmful effects.)
- Faith and Credit: The World Bank's Secular Empire (with Fabrizio Sabelli, Westview Press), 1994; ISBN 978-0-8133-2607-8
- The Lugano Report: On Preserving Capitalism in the 21st Century, 1999; ISBN 0-7453-1532-1
- Another World Is Possible If (Verso Books), 2004; ISBN 1-84467-510-6
- Hijacking America: How the Secular and Religious Right Changed What Americans Think (Polity), 2008; ISBN 978-0-7456-4461-5
- We the Peoples of Europe, 2008; ISBN 978-0-7453-2633-7
- Whose Crisis? Whose Future?, 2010 (Polity); ISBN 978-0-7456-5138-5
- How to Win the Class War – The Lugano Report II, 2013; ISBN 978-90-70563-18-9
- Les Usurpateurs (The usurpers, in French), 2014; ISBN 978-2-02-121378-2
- Shadow Sovereigns: How Global Corporations Are Seizing Power, 2015 (Polity); ISBN 978-0-7456-9782-6
