= Everybody Dies but Me =

Everybody Dies But Me
- Vse umrut, a ya ostanus
- Directed by: Valeriya Gai Germanika
- Written by: Aleksandr Rodionov; Yuriy Klavdiev
- Produced by: Igor Tolstunov; Darya Khliostkina
- Starring: Agniya Kuznetsova; Polina Filonenko; Olga Shuvalova
- Production company: PROFIT (Igor Tolstunov Production Firm)
- Release date: May 21, 2008 (Cannes Film Festival)
- Running time: 80 minutes
- Country: Russia
- Language: Russian

Everybody Dies But Me (Russian: Все умрут, а я останусь, romanized: Vse umrut, a ya ostanus) is a 2008 Russian coming-of-age drama film directed by Valeriya Gai Germanika and starring Agniya Kuznetsova, Polina Filonenko and Olga Shuvalova. Three lower-class Moscow high school friends, Katya, Vika and Janna, learn that there will be a school disco on the coming Saturday night. They start preparations to what seems to be the most important moment in their life.

== Plot ==
Three ninth-grade friends, Zhanna, Vika, and Katya, are preoccupied with how to get boys to like them, where to find alcohol, and how to sneak into a school dance. One day, they defiantly walk out of geometry class and vow eternal friendship to each other. The teacher visits Katya's parents to discuss her behavior, and Katya runs away from home. Because of her actions, the school principal threatens to cancel the upcoming dance.

Fearful of threats from a tenth-grader named Nastya, Zhanna and Vika send Katya back home, deciding to go to the dance without her to avoid drawing attention. This leads to a falling out, and Katya finds a new "friend" named Lyalya, who helps her plan an escape from home.

On the night of the dance, Zhanna and Vika enter the school and head to the bathroom, where they encounter older girls drinking wine, who offer some to them. Zhanna stays with the older girls, while Vika goes to look for Alex, a boy she likes. Soon, Katya arrives and meets Alex, who invites her to join him, which Vika notices. Alex and Katya go to the basement, where they have sex. Katya later returns to the school and is confronted by her mother, who publicly slaps her for running away. Katya turns to Alex for support, but he pretends not to know her in front of his friends and girlfriend Nastya. Meanwhile, Zhanna drinks heavily with the older girls.

Vika, wandering the neighborhood in search of Alex, encounters a group of boys who offer her marijuana. She accepts and ends up kissing one of them while imagining Alex in his place. Meanwhile, Katya, after escaping her mother, returns to the school and faces Nastya, who violently attacks her in front of other students, suspecting her of being involved with Alex. Zhanna, too drunk to stand, is carried out of the school by her father.

Bloodied and bruised, Katya returns home, where her parents have set up a table for a memorial service for Katya’s late grandmother. Her mother tells her to clean up, and her father suggests a shopping trip the next day, assuring her that things will get better with time. In response, Katya curses at them and declares, "Everyone will die, but I’ll stay," before retreating to her room in tears.

== Production ==
The film depicts issues of child alcoholism and violence in Russia. In order to appear more realistic, the actors consumed large quantities of alcohol and tobacco on camera, performed fight scenes without stunts and used many mat profanities. However, the main protagonists were all played by adult professional actors.

== Awards ==
- 2009 Nika Award ("Young Talent Discovery of the Year" nomination)
- 2008 Cannes Film Festival: Prix Regards Jeune (young cinematographer award) and special mention in the Caméra d'Or (best feature film award)
- CineVision award of the Munich Film Festival
- 26 Brussels International Film Festival – «Best Actress» award for the three lead actresses
