= The Third Wave (2007 film) =

- Directed by: Alison Thompson
- Produced by: Oscar Gubernati
- Starring: A.P. Darmedesa; Bruce French; Oscar Gubernati; Donny Paterson; Alison Thompson
- Cinematography: Sunil Elvitigala; Marco Franzoni
- Edited by: Cedar Daniels; Peter Demas
- Music by: Mario Grigorov; Jaron Lanier
- Distributed by: Arts Alliance America
- Release date: 2007
- Running time: 94 minutes
- Countries: United States; Sri Lanka
- Language: English

The Third Wave was a film shot in Sri Lanka following the 2004 Indian Ocean earthquake. It was directed by Alison Thompson and produced by Oscar Gubernati.

== Plot ==
After the 2004 Asian tsunami disaster, four independent volunteers, with little money and no experience, race off to volunteer in tsunami ravaged Sri Lanka. They meet up by fate at the Colombo airport and form a volunteer team. They rent a van, fill it with supplies and start driving down the coast to see where they can help. They stumble into a tribal village called Peraliya, which has been destroyed by a forty-foot wave. During the time the wave hit Peraliya, a train called "The Queen of the Sea" was passing by and was washed away killing over 2,500 passengers and villagers. The four volunteers set up a first aid station and found themselves in charge of running a refugee camp with over 3,000 people. Their initial two week journey turns into a year long odyssey of heartbreak and hope as the villagers turn against them when donated tsunami relief money does not materialize. The volunteers concentrate on the bigger picture and break every rule in the 'Disaster Aid Books'.

== Release ==
The Third Wave first premiered at the 2007 Tribeca Film Festival in New York. In 2008 Sean Penn came aboard as Executive Producer and it screened in the first ever Presidential jury screening at the 2008 Cannes Film Festival. The Third Wave has been an official selection of the Tokyo International Film Festival, Sydney International Film Festival, Denver Film Festival, Monaco Charity Film Festival, South Asian International Film Festival and City of Angels Film Festival in Los Angeles.
