= Laurence S. Moss =

American economist

Laurence S. Moss (1944–2009) was an American economist who specialized in the history of economic thought and the economics of entrepreneurship. He earned his PhD in economics at Columbia University, and later earned a law degree from Suffolk University. Moss was the leading expert on the economic thought of Mountifort Longfield. His doctoral dissertation was published as Mountiford Longfield: Ireland's First Professor of Political Economy. He served as the editor-in-chief of the American Journal of Economics and Sociology from 1997 until the end of his life in 2009.
