= Ashes of Dreams =

- French: L'Ivresse d'une Oasis
- Directed by: Hachimiya Ahamada
- Screenplay by: Hachimiya Ahamada
- Produced by: Shonagon Films
- Edited by: Thibaut Verly
- Release date: 2011
- Running time: 88 minutes
- Country: Comoros
- Languages: French, Swahili

Ashes of Dreams (French: L'Ivresse d'une Oasis) is a 2011 documentary film directed by Hachimiya Ahamada.

== Synopsis ==
A Comorian living in France returns to her native country after the death of her father. She visits the house that he was having built for the whole family, meets with various local people and looks for a cousin in Mayotte. There are home videos of the father wandering in the empty house spliced with interviews with islanders. She engages in family history research on the exiles, relations between those who stay and those who leave. Though the island has abundant natural beauty, many seek to leave to pursue better opportunities, and feel frustrated due to lack of support France has given to its former colony. Meanwhile, many houses sit vacant, awaiting the arrival of their owners.

== Production ==
Director Hachimiya Ahamada was born in Dunkirk, France, and studied film direction at INSAS in Brussels. Ever since she graduated, she had the idea of making the film, and used a VHS video her father sent in 1991 about the house he was building in his native village. By 2006, Ahamada had begun writing the film after receiving a grant. She used traditional music rather than asking musicians to create a score. The film was produced by Shonagon Films. It was co-produced by Audiovisual Center in Brussels with support from the Francophone Fund.

== Release and reception ==
Ashes of Dreams was selected to the Festival International du film d'Afrique et des Îles as well as the Lumières d'Afrique. Shangols considered the first half of the film to be a bit slow, but found the second half to be more interesting.
