= Dudzinski =

Dudzinski is a Slavic surname. Its Polish spelling is Dudziński, feminine: Dudzińska. The Belarusian spelling is Дудзінскі, feminine: Dudzinskaya. The Russian equivalent is Dudinsky. Notable people with the surname include:

- Adam Dudziński
- Agnieszka Dudzińska
- Beata Kamuda-Dudzińska (1960–2024), Polish rower
- Beata Andrejczuk-Dudzińska (1988–2026), Polish chess player
- Danuta Dudzińska-Wieczorek
- Dave Dudzinski
- Helga Dudzinski
- Keith Dudzinski
- Marcel Mendes-Dudziński
- Tomasz Dudziński
