= Hachimiya Ahamada =

French film director of Comorian descent

- Born: 1976 (age 49–50); Dunkirk, France
- Education: INSAS (Brussels)
- Occupation: Film director
- Years active: 2008–present
- Notable work: The Ylang Ylang Residence (2008)
- Awards: Quintessence International Film Festival Award (2009); Francophone Festival of Vaulx-en-Velin Award (2009); African, Asian and Latin American Film Festival of Milan Award (2009)

Hachimiya Ahamada (born 1976) is a French film director of Comorian descent, known for her films about the Comoran diaspora.

== Life ==
Hachimiya Ahamada was born in Dunkirk in 1976, to Comorian parents. She made short documentaries as a teenager at a Dunkirk video studio, and later studied film direction at INSAS in Brussels, graduating in 2004. Her short drama The Ylang Ylang Residence (2008) was shot in the Comoros Islands, and in the Comorian language. The film was screened at over 35 international festivals, including the International Critics Week at the 2008 Cannes Film Festival. It won awards at the 2009 Quintessence International Film Festival of Ouidah, the 2009 Francophone Festival of Vaulx-en-Velin, and the 2009 African, Asian and Latin American Film Festival of Milan.

Ahamada is working on a feature film project, Maïssane or the Canticle of the Stars.

== Filmography ==
- Feu leur rêve [The Dream of Fire], 2004. Documentary short.
- La Résidence Ylang Ylang [The Ylang Ylang Residence], 2008. Short narrative fiction.
- L'Ivresse d'une Oasis [Ashes of Dreams], 2011. Documentary.
- Zanatany, l'empreinte des linceuls esseulés [Zanatany, when soulless shrouds whisper], 2024. Short narrative fiction.
