= La Résidence Ylang Ylang =

- Directed by: Hachimiya Ahamada
- Screenplay by: Hachimiya Ahamada
- Produced by: Aurora Films
- Starring: Abidine Said Mohamed, Asthadina Msa Soilihi, Fahamwe Ibouroi, Mama Hayiriya, Aboubacar Said Salim, Ahamada Saandi
- Cinematography: Claire Mathon
- Edited by: Thomas Marchand
- Music by: Nawal
- Release date: 2008
- Running time: 20 minutes
- Countries: Comoros; France

La Résidence Ylang Ylang [The Ylang Ylang Residence] is a 2008 short film by Hachimiya Ahamada.

== Synopsis ==
A Comorian village. Djibril spends his free time taking care of an abandoned villa. While he is busy there, his cabin catches fire. Homeless, he must find a place to live.

== Awards ==
- Festival del cortometraje francófono Vaulx-en-Velin 2009
- Festival internacional de cortometrajes Clermont-Ferrand 2009
- Quintessence, Ouidah IFF 2009
