= The American Journal of Economics and Sociology =

Peer-reviewed academic journal

- Discipline: Political economics, social philosophy
- Language: English
- Edited by: Clifford W. Cobb

Publication details
- History: 1941–present
- Publisher: Wiley-Blackwell (United States)
- Frequency: 5/year
- Open access: Hybrid
- Impact factor: 0.455 (2018)

Standard abbreviations
- ISO 4: Am. J. Econ. Sociol.

Indexing
- CODEN: AJESA3
- ISSN: 0002-9246 (print); 1536-7150 (web)
- LCCN: 45042294
- OCLC no.: 01480136

Links
- Journal homepage; Online access; Online archive

The American Journal of Economics and Sociology is a peer-reviewed academic journal established in 1941 by Will Lissner with support from the Robert Schalkenbach Foundation. The purpose of the journal was to create a forum for continuing discussion of the issues raised by Henry George, a political economist, social philosopher, and political activist of the late 19th century. The editor-in-chief is Clifford W. Cobb.

== Abstracting and indexing ==
The journal is abstracted and indexed in:

- CAB Abstracts
- Current Contents/Social & Behavioral Sciences
- Scopus
- Social Sciences Citation Index

According to the Journal Citation Reports, the journal has a 2018 impact factor of 0.455, ranking it 328th out of 363 in the category "Economics" and 134 out of 148 in the category "Sociology".

== See also ==
- Georgism
