= The End of Poverty? =

2008 film directed by Philippe Díaz

- Directed by: Philippe Diaz
- Written by: Philippe Diaz
- Produced by: Beth Portello; Robert Schalkenbach
- Narrated by: Martin Sheen
- Cinematography: Philippe Diaz
- Edited by: Thomas Staunton
- Production company: Cinema Libre Studio
- Distributed by: Cinema Libre Studio
- Release date: November 13, 2009
- Running time: 106 minutes
- Country: United States
- Language: English

The End of Poverty? is a 2008 documentary film about poverty directed by Philippe Diaz. It is narrated by Martin Sheen and was produced by Cinema Libre Studio in association with the non-profit Robert Schalkenbach Foundation. The film was selected for the international critic's week award at the 2008 Cannes Festival.

== Synopsis ==
The aphorism "The poor are always with us" dates back to the New Testament, but while the phrase is still sadly apt in the 21st century, few seem to be able to explain why poverty is so widespread. Activist filmmaker Philippe Diaz examines the history and impact of economic inequality in the third world in The End of Poverty?, and makes the compelling argument that it's not an accident or simple bad luck that has created a growing underclass around the world. Diaz traces the growth of global poverty back to colonization in the 15th century, and features interviews with a number of economists, sociologists, and historians who explain how poverty is the clear consequence of free-market economic policies that allow powerful nations to exploit poorer countries for their assets and keep money in the hands of the wealthy rather than distributing it more equitably to the people who have helped them gain their fortunes. Diaz also explores how wealthy nations (especially the United States) seize a disproportionate share of the world's natural resources, and how this imbalance is having a dire impact on the environment as well as the economy.

— Mark Deming

The film begins with footage depicting the condition of severe poverty faced by many people in underdeveloped countries and contrasting it with the prosperity and wealth of developed countries. The persistent inequality between countries is established to be the main theme of the film.

The film then shifts to an historical perspective and describes the colonization of the Americas by European in 1492 as the start of this unequal relationship between the West and the rest of the world. It asserts that this colonization, which was repeated in Africa and Asia, was a means of extracting large amounts of wealth and exporting it to Europe, first through the plundering of the colonies, which involved the destruction of the local people and their communities, and then by appropriating their land and labour into the European economy. The film claims that this condition of landlessness persisted long after the colonies gained independence, forcing many to work in horrific conditions for extremely low wages.

Interviewing several scholars, the film discusses how the colonial powers were able to finance the industrialization of their own economy with the wealth that they obtained from their colonies. By employing native populations and African slaves on plantations of sugarcane, cacao, and other products, as well as in mines (such as the silver mines of Potosí in Bolivia), countries like Spain and England were able to attain their "developed" status, according to the film. It depicts these instituted economies as both severely exploiting the people who laboured on the plantations and in the mines, as well as locking these economies into producing only export goods, for which they became dependent on European markets. Colonies also became dependent on European products for their own domestic needs, as the majority of the colonial economy was geared toward exports. The colonists ensured that the exports were raw materials that were then processed into finished goods by their own industrialized economies. An imbalance was created by the destruction of indigenous technical capabilities in the colonies (such as the destruction of the Indian textile industry) and led to an increased dependency on Europe for finished consumer goods. This dependency, it is claimed, persists even today, allowing developed countries to benefit from the imbalance.

Turning to the period after World War II when most colonies gained political independence, the film states that the former colonies are nonetheless trapped within an international system of neocolonialism. International institutions like the World Bank and International Monetary Fund (IMF), it argues, forced policies that allowed Western countries and Western companies to continue to extract wealth from the former colonies. These institutions provided loans for large industrial projects in the name of "poverty reduction" and "development" that left these countries in high debt. Western countries, particularly the United States, gained huge quantities of wealth by means of the repayments of these debts, as well as through contracts for the industrial projects that the loans were designed for. Structural adjustment, another programme of the World Bank and IMF, made loans conditional on the recipient countries implementing policies of trade and capital market liberalization and privatization, allowing Western economies to benefit from unequal terms of trade and through the return on capital invested in the emerging economies. The film documents how the privatization of key sectors like health, water, and education led to increased costs and the displacement of people from their lands.

The documentary then examines the various military and covert interventions conducted by the United States, allegedly in support of the economic interests of American corporations. It discusses examples like the overthrow of Salvador Allende in Chile, the 1953 Iranian coup d'état, and the overthrow of Jacobo Árbenz in Guatemala. In each case, the film claims, the purpose was to further the interests of Western corporations: the Anglo-Iranian Oil Company in Iraq and the United Fruit Company in Guatemala.

Turning to possible solutions to global poverty, the film argues that forgiving international debt and returning the control of key natural resources to communal ownership are essential to lifting people out of poverty.

== Interviewees ==
- John Christensen, economist
- Clifford Cobb
- William Easterly, economist
- Susan George, political scientist
- Chalmers Johnson, author, professor, and CIA consultant
- Serge Latouche, professor
- Álvaro García Linera
- John Perkins, author
- Amartya Sen, economist
- Martin Sheen, narrator
- Joseph Stiglitz, economist and professor
- Eric Toussaint
- Jaime de Amorim
- Nimrod Arackha
- David Ellerman
- Joshua Farley
- Miloon Kothari
- Michael J. Watts
- Jim Schultz

^{(partial list)}
