= Transnational Institute =

Think-tank based in Amsterdam, Netherlands

- Abbreviation: TNI
- Established: 1974; 52 years ago
- Founded at: Amsterdam, Netherlands
- Type: NGO
- Coordinates: 52.3839918°N 4.8801102°E
- Executive Director: Fiona Dove
- Website: www.tni.org

The Transnational Institute (TNI) is an international non-profit research and advocacy think tank that was founded in 1974 in Amsterdam, Netherlands. According to their website, the organization promotes a "just, democratic and sustainable world."

== History ==
TNI was founded in 1974 in Amsterdam by Eqbal Ahmad, who was the organization's first director. Initially it operated as an international arm of the Institute for Policy Studies.

In 1976 the director of the institute (Orlando Letelier) was assassinated by the Chilean secret police as ordered by Augusto Pinochet.

Pauline Tiffen is chair of the supervisory board of the TNI.

Fiona Dove is the executive director of TNI. Susan George was TNI's honorary President until her death in 2026.

The members of the institute are involved in the civil society and the associative life of their respective countries. Based in Amsterdam, the permanent team of TNI consisted of twenty nine people in 2021.

== Work ==
The TNI publishes research papers, books and organises seminars and debates. Its members include activists, researchers, writers, scholars, journalists and documentary makers. The organisation has specific interest sections called "programs". These are the fields the organisation currently focuses on.

=== Drugs and democracy ===
The program analyses worldwide trends on drugs-policies and promotes a pragmatic approach to drugs based on damage-control. It has written on countries in Latin America and Southeast Asia.

Ricardo Soberón, a lawyer, academic, writer and consultant for Peru's governmental policies on drugs, has carried out research for TNI.

=== Public alternatives ===
The public alternatives program publishes research and organises events on the following topics

- The effects of privatisation such as water privatisation
- Energy democracy
- The return of public services or re-municipalization for which it has documented more than 200 cases.
- Transformative Cities
- Participatory democracy

=== Trade and investment ===
Publications

- Financialisation: A Primer (2018 update) - about financialization

=== Other programs ===
- Myanmar
- War & Pacification
- Colombia
- Agrarian & Environmental Justice
- Corporate Power
