= Philippe Diaz =

French filmmaker and producer

- Born: Philippe Diaz; Paris, France
- Education: University of Sorbonne
- Occupations: Director, producer, writer, cinematographer, editor
- Years active: 1980–present

Philippe Diaz, is a French filmmaker and producer. He is best known as the director of critically acclaimed films The Empire in Africa, New World Order: Somewhere in Africa and Now & Later.

== Personal life ==
He was born in Paris, France.

== Career ==
He studied philosophy at the University of Sorbonne. In 1980, Díaz started to make several short documentaries, largely for companies. In 1985, he worked as the executive producer and founded his production company 'Films Plain Chant'. After the establishment of production company, he started to produce the film Havre in 1986, which was later followed by, Rue du Départ and Mauvais Sang.

In 1989, he produced his fourth feature film Pierre et Djemila which was directed by Gérard Blain. The film received official competition at the Cannes Film Festival as well. Then Diaz produced an English film in India: La Nuit Bengali. The film became the directorial debut for Nicolas Klotz and Hugh Grant. With this film, he started to make collaborations with American studios, especially Columbia Pictures. Immediately, New Line Cinema also contacted Diaz to co-fund and produce the film The Walraff Affair, a political thriller starring Jurgen Prochnow and Peter Coyote.

In 1991, he moved to Los Angeles and continued to produce social and political films. After 1995, he collaborated French and African-based films to American audiences. In 2001, he produced the film Heavy Metal 2000, a collaboration with Columbia. In 2001, he made his directorial debut with the documentary New World Order: Somewhere in Africa. Due to its success, he then made the film The Empire in Africa in 2006.

== Filmography ==
Year	Film	Role	Genre	Ref.
1986	Havre	producer	Film	
1986	The Way Out	producer	Film	
1986	Bad Blood	executive producer	Film	
1987	Pierre and Djemila	producer	Film	
1987	Candy Mountain	producer	Film	
1987	Cayenne Palace	producer	Film	
1988	Foreign City	producer	Film	
1988	Eden miseria	producer	Film	
1990	The Bengali Night	producer	Film	
1990	The Man Inside	producer	Film	
1997	Le cri du lézard	co-producer	Film	
2000	St. Patrick's Day	executive producer	Film	
2001	Heavy Metal 2000	executive producer	Film	
2001	New World Order: Somewhere in Africa	Director, producer	Documentary	
2005	Uncovered: The War on Iraq	co-producer	Documentary	
2005	The Third Wish	producer	Film	
2006	The Empire in Africa	Director	Documentary	
2006	Conventioneers	executive producer	Film	
2006	The Empire in Africa	producer, editor	Documentary	
2006	Tre	producer	Film	
2007	Speaking Freely Volume 1: John Perkins	Director, editor	Video documentary	
2007	Speaking Freely Volume 2: Susan George	Director	Video documentary	
2007	Speaking Freely Volume 3: Ray McGovern	Director	Video documentary	
2008	Speaking Freely Volume 4: Chalmers Johnson	Director	Video documentary	
2008	Speaking Freely Volume 5: Hugo Chávez	Director	Video documentary	
2008	The End of Poverty?	Director, writer, cinematographer	Documentary	
2009	Now & Later	Director, producer, writer	Film	
2009	Driving to Zigzigland	producer	Film	
2018	Paura Dell'Ignoto	Editor	Short film	
2024	Angola 1, 2 & 3	Director, writer	Film	
