= Claude Ventura =

French film director

- Born: 4 July 1938 (age 87)
- Occupation: Film director

Claude Ventura (born 4 July 1938) is a French film director.

== Biography ==
=== Background ===
The son of Greek Sephardic Jews from Salonica, his mother was the daughter of a wealthy textile merchant from the upper town, while his father came from a very poor family. His father, a journalist and co-founder of the Federation of Greek Communist Youth, was appointed Paris correspondent for the daily Le Progrès de Salonique in the early 1930s. His mother ran a small hosiery shop on Rue du Faubourg Saint-Antoine. The part of his family that remained in Salonica was deported by the Nazis and ultimately perished in Auschwitz. He escaped the roundup in the 11th arrondissement on August 20, 1941, by fleeing to Marseille, then to Montagnac-sur-Auvignon in the Lot-et-Garonne.

=== Career ===
In Tous en scène (1968–1970), on the second channel, he filmed 'in a sort of concrete sail-shaped temple he caused a huge scandal with the episode 'the Scouts,' aired on Easter evening, that it reached the Chamber of Deputies — resulting in all of them being suspended for six months.

He collaborates to television shows as Italics, Cinéma, Cinémas, Panorama, La saga des Français, Bande à part, Un jour futur, Lancelot and a musical portrait of Liverpool in 1974. He was engaged with Gaëlle Royer for ten years, the mother of Emma de Caunes.

Later, a re-release of Cinéma, Cinémas encountered legal challenges related to film and music rights, nearly resulting in its cancellation in 2008."

== Filmography ==
Television

- 1968-1970 : Tous en scène
- 1972 : The Velvet Underground at Le Bataclan '72
- 1973 : Italics
- 1974 : Extraits du journal de J.-H. Lartigue
- 1970-1974 : Pop2
- 1975 : John Lewis
- 1982-1991 : Cinema Cinemas, magazine TV
- 1982 : Chorus
- 1981 : Sonny Rollins
- 1995 : Hank Williams, Vie et mot d'un cadillac cow-boy
- 1995 : Johnny Hallyday, All Access
- 1998 : Eddy Mitchell
- 1998 : Francis Scott Fitzgerald, Retour à Babylone
- 1999 : Gina, Sophia et moi
- 2002 : La Femme de papier
- 2005 : Guy Peellaert, l’art et la manière
- 2006 : Jacques Monory

Documentary

- 1993 : Chambre 12, Hôtel de Suède, on the set of À bout de souffle
- 1988 : À la recherche de la couleur perdue
- 2013 : Les Garçons de Rollin, 85 min
- 2016 : Fitzgerald - Hemingway, une question de taille, serie Duels

Cinéma

- 2000 : En quête des Sœurs Papin

== Bibliography ==
- La télévision des Trente Glorieuses: Culture et politique, d'Avner Ben-Amos, 2013
