= Igor Dudinsky =

Russian journalist (1947–2022)

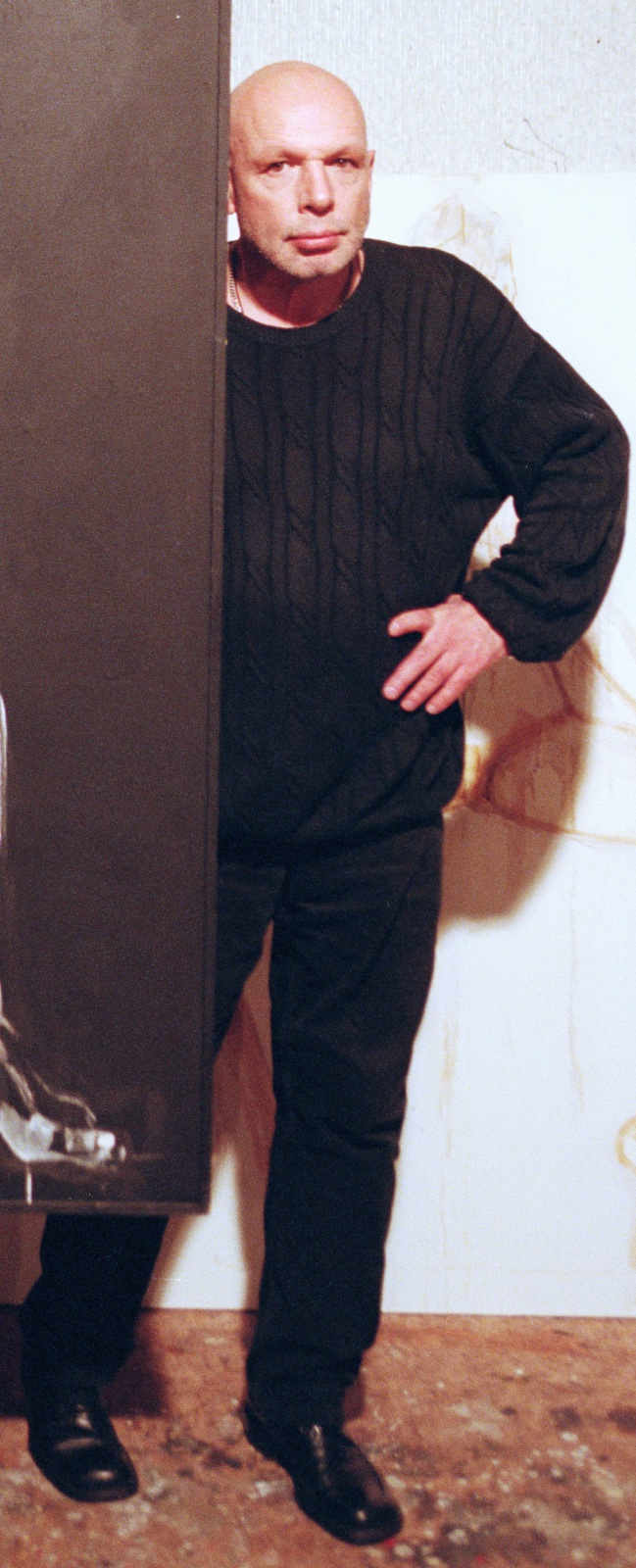
Dudinsky in 2000

Igor Ilyich Dudinsky (Russian: Игорь Ильич Дудинский; 31 March 1947 – 11 June 2022) was a Soviet and Russian journalist, writer, art critic, and visual artist.

== Biography ==
Dudinsky was born in Moscow in the family of the international economist Ilya Vladimirovich Dudinsky.

He was an active participant in the Moscow bohemian life. In 1965 he entered the MSU Faculty of Economics. He began to participate in the dissident movement and on 5 December 1965, he went to a demonstration in defense of Andrei Sinyavsky and Yuli Daniel, after which he was expelled from the university.

He worked as a special correspondent for Ogoniok Magazine.

From 1995 to 2005 he worked at the Megapolis Express Publishing House.

He was a Moscow correspondent for the literary and artistic almanac Muleta and the newspaper Evening Bell, which were published by the artist and art critic Vladimir Kotlyarov (Tolstoy) who had emigrated to Paris. He was the deputy editor-in-chief of newspaper Literary News. He founded and published the newspaper The Last Pole and the magazine Continent Russia.

In 2007 he became the first deputy editor-in-chief of the Moscow Correspondent newspaper. In 2021, Dudinsky's fifth book Four Sisters was published

== Family ==
Married for the thirteenth time. Daughter — film director Valeriya Gai Germanika.
