= Valeriya Gai Germanika =

Russian film director

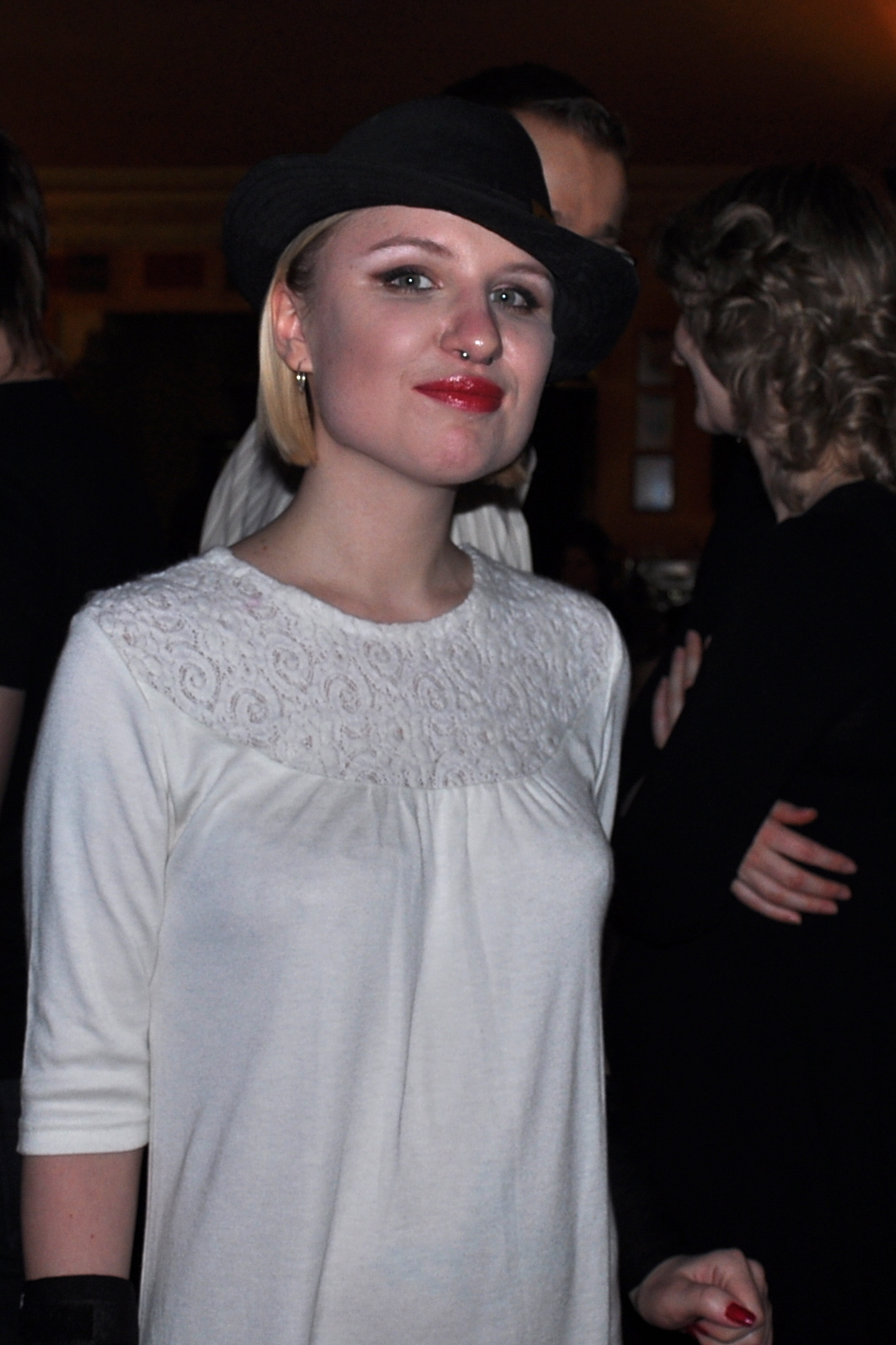
Valeriya Gai Germanika in 2009.

Valeriya Gai Alexandrovna Germanika (Russian: Валерия Гай Александровна Германика; born Valeriya Igorevna Dudinskaya, Russian: Вале́рия И́горевна Дуди́нская, 1 March 1984) is a Russian film director dedicated to the topics of coming-of-age. She was awarded several awards for the feature film Everybody Dies But Me.

== Name ==
Valeriya Gai Germanika was born and registered Valeriya, named after Lucius Cornelius Sulla's wife Valeria, and later legally changed her given name, patronymic (to alienate from the biological father) and family name (in a Roman style) upon her adolescence.

== Biography and career ==
Born to a Bohemian Moscow family (father Igor Dudinsky) and trained at the Internews Cinema and Television School, Valeriya started directing at age nineteen. Her second film The Girls and subsequent The Birthday of the Infanta (both documentary) appeared at the Kinotavr film festival.

In the beginning of 2010, Channel One aired Valeriya Gai Germanika's highly-controversial 69-episode TV-series School portraying teenagers life in an ordinary Moscow school. The project caused a lot of heated debates in Russian society due to unusual depiction of Russian school routine, including subcultures, promiscuity, alcoholism, drug use, etc.

Valeriya has been the creative director for MTV Russia since 2010.

== Filmography ==
- Sisters (2005)
- Girls (documentary, 2005)
- Boys (2007)
- Birthday of the Infanta (documentary, 2005)
- Everybody Dies but Me (2008)
- School (Shkola) (TV series, 2010)
- Brief Guide To A Happy Life (TV Series, 2012)
- Yes And Yes (2013)
