= Alison Thompson =

Australian global humanitarian volunteer

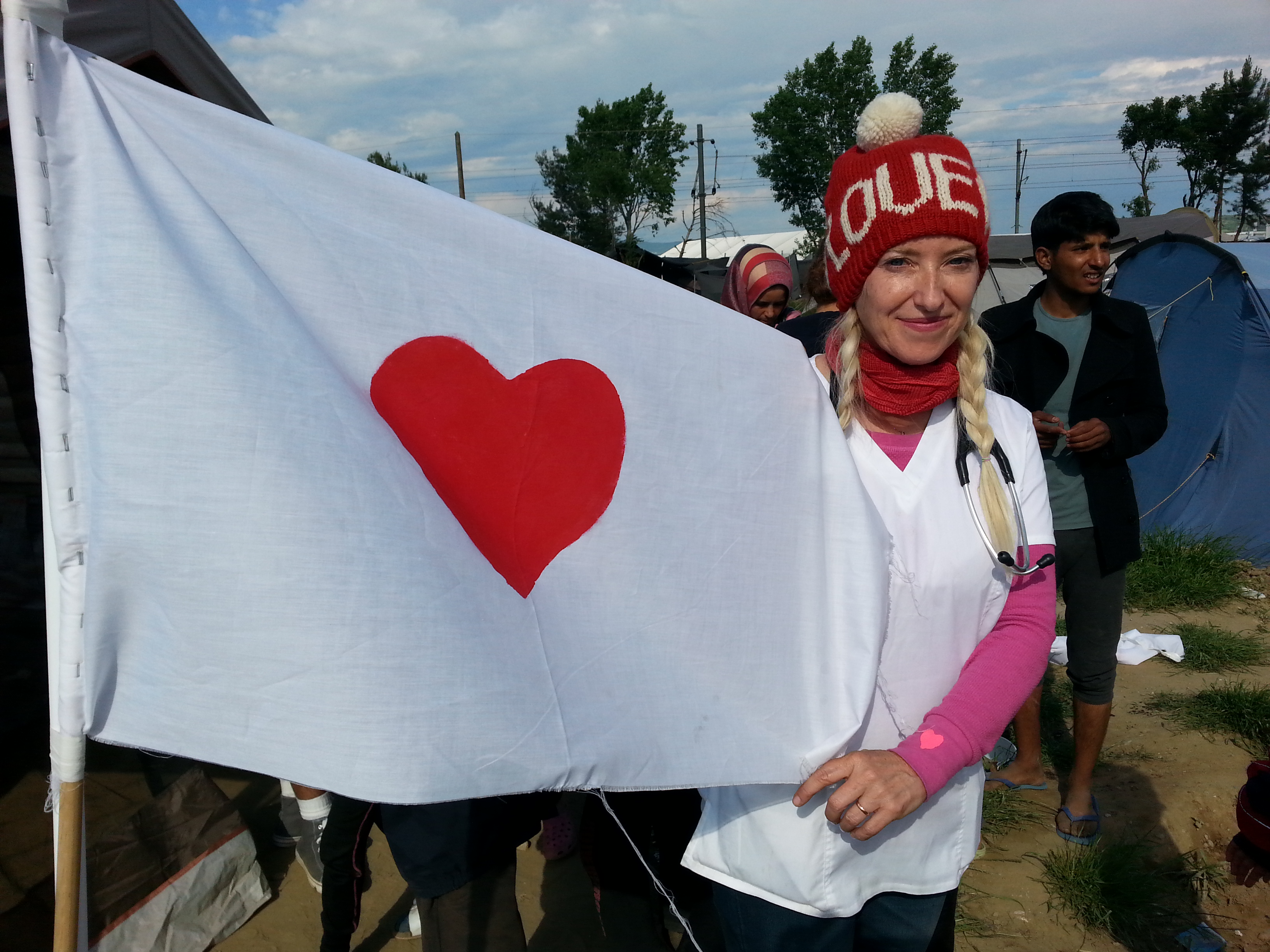
Alison Thompson holding her heart flag.

Alison Thompson is a global humanitarian volunteer and the Founder of Third Wave Volunteers, a United States–based nonprofit that responds to disasters and crises around the world. She was born in Sutherland Shire, Sydney, Australia.

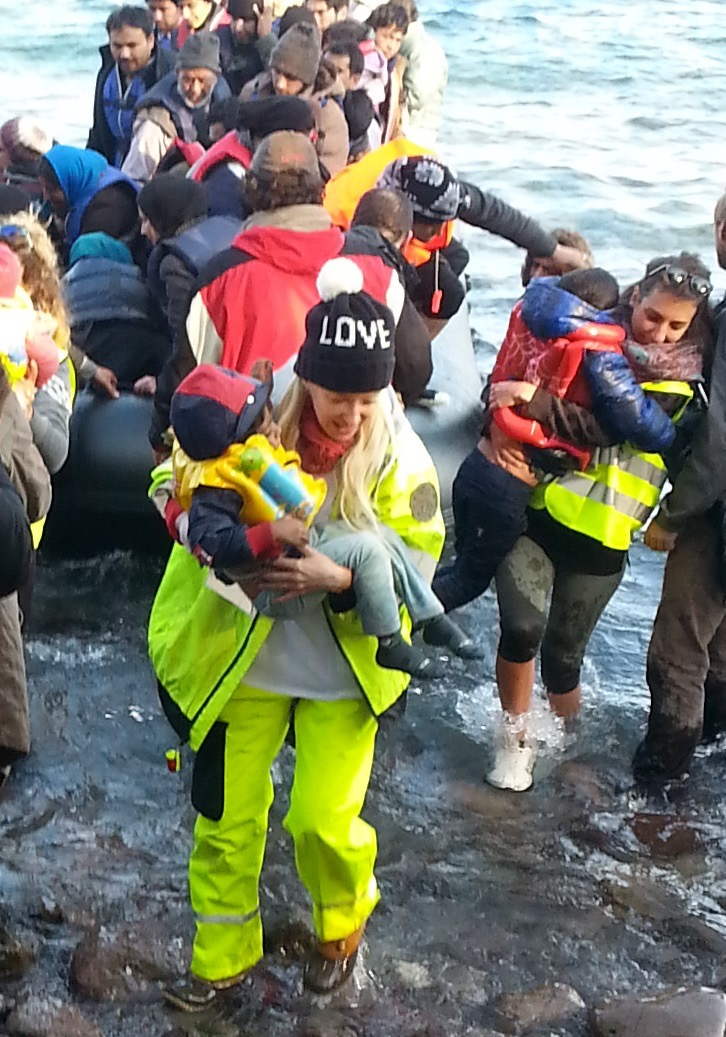
Alison Thompson helping Syrian refugees off a boat.

== Biography ==
Early in her life, Thompson worked in Australia as a nurse and math teacher, then worked on Wall Street, attended New York University Film School and became a film director with the Directors Guild of America. Her current full-time volunteer efforts emerged as a result of her experiences following the September 11, 2001 attacks in New York City. Thompson worked at Ground Zero for nine months and afterward, founded Third Wave Volunteers. Thompson is a Mass Incident Commander and paramedic nurse. In 2012, Alison was appointed as the first official Ambassador to the Haitian Ministry of Environment, where she still works in reforestation, sustainable energy, and cholera initiatives. In 2015, a Doctorate of Letters in the Humanities was conferred upon her by Loyola Chicago University, for her dedication to service, advocacy for women's rights and commitment to encourage and inspire people to give back to their world. Her expertise includes running large refugee camps, field hospitals, and resiliency hubs both during and after natural and man-made disasters. Under her leadership, Third Wave Volunteers has grown to over thirty thousand (30,000) first responders who have deployed to events around the world. When discussing the ever-present need for volunteers, Thompson often cites two mottos: "Everyone is needed. No skills required," and "It's easy to be in the wrong place at the wrong time. But, it's leadership to be in the wrong place at the right time." Thompson believes everyone is needed and lectures on leadership, volunteering, sustainability, renewable energy, gender-based violence, vulnerable climates, and corporate social responsibility via the American Program Bureau.

=== Disasters ===
Deployments after disasters have included search-and-rescue, medical team support, telehealth, solar power, water filtration, aid, and logistics teams. Support teams have provided access to food and medical supplies, Wi-Fi, solar power, solar lights, and water filtration. Ukraine war (2022-ongoing) Los Angeles Fires (2025) Hurricane Melissa (2025): Command and long-term support have been provided as needed. Deployments have occurred following Hurricane Ian (2022), Hurricane Fiona (2022), the Kentucky tornado outbreak (2021), Hurricane Ida (2021), Haiti Earthquake (2021), Saint Vincent Volcanic Eruption (2021) Hurricane Laura (2020), Australian brushfires (2019-2020), Hurricane Dorian (2019), Hurricane Michael (2018), Hurricane Florence (2018), Guatemala Volcanic Eruptions (2018) Hurricane Maria (2017), Hurricane Harvey (2017), Hurricane Irma (2017), Hurricane Matthew (2016), Syrian Refugee Crises (2015-2017), Nepal Earthquake (2015), Typhoon Haiyan (2013) Haiti Earthquake (2010-2026), 2004 Indian Ocean earthquake and tsunami (2004), and Hurricane Katrina (2005). Sept 11th Responder (2001-2002)

=== Refugee Support ===
Refugee support is an important mission for Thompson. Third Wave volunteers have responded to global crises and focused on caring for the needs of the displaced and disenfranchised. They worked on the island of Lesvos, Greece, the epicenter of the Syrian refugee crisis. In addition to caring for immediate medical needs, they developed a large network of volunteers who supported and coordinated direct aid for the refugees. Thompson and her teams have distributed over 100,000 solar lights. Similar support has been provided to Iraq and Afghan war refugees and for individuals in Venezuela.

=== Long-term Deployments and Support ===
Third Wave Volunteers assist community and governmental leaders in developing long-term sustainability projects and collaborative relationships, and building resiliency. One example occurred following the 2004 Indian Ocean earthquake and tsunami, when Thompson co-founded CTEC, Sri Lanka’s first Community Tsunami Early-warning Center.

Many disasters have necessitated long-term deployments. After the 2010 Haiti earthquake, Thompson, Sean Penn, and 10 doctors managed a 75,000-person IDP camp and field hospital. Third Wave Volunteers spent a year in Puerto Rico following Hurricane Maria (2017). They conducted Disaster Zone assessments and educated and supported local community leaders, building resiliency for future natural disasters. One hundred and three containers of aid were delivered, door-to-door. This included tens of thousands of solar lights and water filtration units. In response to Hurricane Dorian, the worst natural disaster to strike the Bahamas in recorded history, 2,500 volunteers deployed in Miami and to the islands. Third Wave Volunteers coordinated 220 volunteer flights, distributed 51 containers of supplies (over 800,000 pounds) on Grand Bahama and the Abaco Islands, and cleared 50 miles of road on Grand Bahama. Volunteers coordinated the Bahama Interfaith Alliance, comprising over fifty churches, planned and held sixteen Community Resilience Fairs and helped launch eight long term sustainable projects as part of the Bahamas Resilience and Regeneration Initiative.

=== Covid-19 Pandemic ===
During the pandemic, Thompson and Third Wave volunteers, known collectively as "Women in White", delivered over 2 million N95 masks to all 50 states, underserved communities, tribal nations, nursing homes, prisons, first responders and to Puerto Rico, the Bahamas, Peru, and Haiti.

=== 2022 Russian Invasion of Ukraine ===
Third Wave Volunteers immediately responded to the crisis in Ukraine as Russia attacked in 2022. Thompson and her volunteers made nine trips over the course of a year to Ukraine to teach TCCCC combat medics to Ukrainian civilians and soldiers, help evacuate orphans from the country, and deliver food, tourniquets and other medical supplies to the recaptured villages on the front lines of the war.

=== CEOC Emergency Response ===
In 2017, Thompson and Third Wave co-founded the Community Emergency Operations Center in Miami (CEOC), a collaboration of 160 organizations with expanded to ten cities. In addition to providing various aid to the community, CERT emergency response training is provided to increase self-protection skills and to increase community readiness to assist after a disaster.

== Board Membership ==
United Nations Chaplains Association

MACtown Inc. – Miami

== Awards and honors ==
2026 Australian of the Year N.S.W. 2022 Presidential Lifetime Service Award

2019 Dr. Martin Luther King Jr. Humanitarian Award

2019 Volunteer Agency Service Award- Governors Hurricane Conference

2019 ReThink Energy Florida Innovator Award - Statewide Energy Innovator Award

2019 Woman of Peace Award

2019 Florida Highway Patrol Award of Appreciation

2019 Hope Prize TEDX Talk

2015 Loyola Chicago University Honorary ‘Doctorate of Letters’ in 'Humanities'

2016 City of Miami Award for 20 years of humanitarian work

2012 InStyle Magazine award for Charity and Community

2010 Honored by US Army Two-Star General Simeon Trombitas and the 82nd Airborne Division with the US Commanders Medal of Excellence Award

2010 The Paul Harris award from Rotary International

2010 Order of Australia Medal (OAM)2010 Australia Day Honours for volunteerism, bravery and contribution to mankind

2005 Humanitarian award from the President of Sri Lanka

== Media ==
Her award-winning documentary The Third Wave chronicles her volunteer experience in Sri Lanka after the 2004 tsunami and was screened at the 2008 Cannes Film Festival in a Presidential Jury Screening presented by Sean Penn and Bono. She followed up with a book published by Random House called The Third Wave: A Volunteer Story.
