= List of French films of 1987 =

A list of films produced in France in 1987.

French films released in 1987
Title	Director	Cast	Genre	Notes
Accroche-coeur	Chantal Picault	Patrick Bauchau, Sandrine Dumas, László Szabó	Comedy	
Agent trouble	Jean-Pierre Mocky	Catherine Deneuve, Richard Bohringer, Tom Novembre	Mystery, thriller	
Agosto				
Amantide - Scirocco				
Boyfriends and Girlfriends	Éric Rohmer	Emmanuelle Chaulet, Eric Vieillard, Sophie Renoir	Comedy, romance	
L'Amour est blette	Magali Clément	Bernard-Pierre Donnadieu, Grace de Capitani		
L'Amour selon Jeanne				
L'Arbre mort	Joseph Morder	Rosette, Patrick Zocco	Comedy drama	
Association of Wrongdoers	Claude Zidi	François Cluzet, Christophe Malavoy, Jean-Pierre Bisson	Comedy	
Atlantide II				
Attention fillettes!	Gerard Kikoine	Alban Ceray, Marilyn Jess		
Au revoir les enfants	Louis Malle	Gaspard Manesse, Raphaël Fejtö, Francine Racette	Drama	French-West German co-production
Au-delà du souvenir	Alain Mazars	N.T. Binh, Ke Long Shi	—N/a	
Avec sentiment	Paul Vechiali	Patachou, Pierre Billon		
Avril brisé	Liria Bégéja	Jean-Claude Adelin, Violetta Sanchez, Alexandre Arbatt	—N/a	
Beatrice	Bertrand Tavernier	Bernard-Pierre Donnadieu, Julie Delpy, Nils Tavernier	Drama	French-Italian co-production
Le Beauf	Yves Amoureux	Gérard Jugnot, Gérard Darmon, Marianne Basler	Comedy-drama	
Blanche et Claire				
Brand New Day	Amos Gitai	Annie Lennox, David A. Stewart, Jimmy Zavala	Documentary	French-British co-production
Brigade de nuit				
Brise-glace	Raúl Ruiz		—N/a	Short film; French-Swedish co-production
La Brute	Claude Guillemot	Jean Carmet, Xavier Deluc	Drama	
Buisson ardent	Laurent Perrin	Jean-Claude Adelin, Jessica Forde, Alice de Poncheville	Comedy drama	
Cayenne Palace	Alain Maline	Richard Berry, Jean Yanne, Xavier Deluc	Adventure	
Chaleurs				
Chamane	Thomas Gilou	Dominique Pinon, Maxime Leroux		
Charlie Dingo	Gilles Béhat	Guy Marchand, Caroline Cellier, Laurent Malet	Comedy	
Chateauroux district	Philippe Charigot	Nathalie Nell, Guy Marchand		
Chouette aveugle	Raul Ruiz	Francois Berthet, Jean-Marie Boeglin	Drama	
Le Cinéma dans les yeux	Gilles Jacob, Laurent Jacob			
Club de rencontres	Michel Lang	Francis Perrin, Jean-Paul Comart, Valérie Allain	Comedy	
Le Coeur musicien	Frédéric Rossif		Documentary	
Commando Mengele				
Comment Wang-Fo fut sauvé	René Laloux			
Comédie!	Jacques Doillon	Jane Birkin, Alain Souchon		
La Concierge est dans l'escalier				
La Conscience				
Court voyage				
Chronicle of a Death Foretold	Francesco Rosi	Rupert Everett, Ornella Muti, Anthony Delon	Drama	Italian-French-Colombian co-production
Control	Giuliano Montaldo	Kate Nelligan, Burt Lancaster, Burt Lancaster, Ben Gazzara	Drama	Italian-French-Canadian co-production
Cross	Philippe Setbon	Michel Sardou, Roland Giraud, Marie-Anne Chazel	Crime	
The Cry of the Owl	Claude Chabrol	Christophe Malavoy, Mathilda May, Jacques Penot	Thriller	
Côté nuit				
D'après Maria	Jean-Claude Robert	Teresa Madruga, Steve Kalfa	Drama short	
D'une heure à l'autre				
Dans le sac	Karim Dridi	Henri Poirier, Janine Souchon		
De Gaulle ou l'éternel défi	Jean Labib		Documentary	
De guerre lasse	Robert Enrico	Nathalie Baye, Pierre Arditi, Christophe Malavoy	—N/a	
Dernier été à Tanger	Alexandre Arcady	Thierry Lhermitte, Valeria Golino, Roger Hanin	Crime	French-Italian co-production
La Dernière mouche				
Les Deux crocodiles	Joel Seria	Jean-Pierre Marielle, Jean Carmet, Marie-Christine Adam	Comedy	
Deuxième sous-sol				
Le Diable rose	Pierre B. Reinhard	Brigitte Lahale, Roger Carel	Comedy	
Dunia				
Duo				
Duo solo	Jean-Pierre Delattre	Pierre Semmler, Patrick Chesnais		
Démons, Zeimert veille...				
Eden 2				
Elle et lui	Francois Margolin		Short film	
Emmanuelle 5	Walerian Borowczyk	Monique Gabrielle, Crofton Hardester, Dana Burns Westberg	Adult	
En silence				
Les Enfants de la terre qui tremble				
Ennemis intimes	Denis Amar	Michel Serrault, Ingrid Held	Drama	
Escalier de service				
La Face cachée de la lune	Yvonn Marciano		Short film	
The Family	Ettore Scola	Vittorio Gassman, Fanny Ardant, Stefania Sandrelli	Drama	Italian-French co-production
Le Feu rouge pépé				
Field of Honor	Jean-Pierre Denis	Cris Campion, Pascale Rocard, Eric Wapler	Drama, war	
Fil rouge				
Fille de rêve				
Flag	Jacques Santi	Richard Bohringer, Pierre Arditi, Philippine Leroy-Beaulieu	—N/a	French-Canadian co-production
I Fotografia				
Four Adventures of Reinette and Mirabelle	Éric Rohmer	Joëlle Miquel, Jessica Forde, Philippe Laudenbach	Comedy drama	
François Villon - Poetul vagabond	Sergiu Nicolaescu	Christophe Odent, Marc de Jonge	Drama	Co-production with Romania
Fucking Fernand	Gerard Mordillat	Thierry Lhermitte, Jean Yanne, Marie Laforêt	Comedy drama	French-German co-production
Funny Boy	Christian Le Hémonet	Gérard Lecaillon, Valérie Mairesse, Anaïs Jeannet	Comedy drama	
La Gifle et la caresse				
Girls Apart				
Gobseck				
Good Morning, Babylon	Paolo Taviani, Vittorio Taviani	Vincent Spano, Joaquim de Almeida, Greta Scacchi	Drama	French-Italian-American co-production
The Grand Highway	Jean-Loup Hubert	Anémone, Richard Bohringer, Antoine Hubert	Drama	
Le Grand escalator				
Grand Guignol	Jean Marboeuf	Caroline Cellier, Guy Marchand, Michel Galabru	Drama	
Le Gynécologue et sa secrétaire				
Harry Polar détective				
Histoires de familles				
L' Homme le plus gentil du monde				
L' Homme qui n'était pas là	René Féret	René Féret, Claude Jade, Jacques Dufilho	—N/a	
L' Homme qui était fou des femmes				
L' Homme voilé	Maroun Bagdadi	Bernard Giraudeau, Michel Piccoli, Laure Marsac	Drama	
Horoscope favorable				
Hôtel de France	Patrice Chéreau	Laurent Grévill, Valéria Bruni-Tedeschi, Vincent Perez	Drama	
Ici là bas				
Il est génial papy!	Michel Drach	Guy Bedos, Marie Laforêt, Fabien Chombart	Comedy	
L' Inattendue				
In the Shadow of the Wind	Yves Simoneau	Steve Banner, Lothaire Bluteau, Angèle Coutu	Drama	Canadian-French co-production
Initiation d'une jeune marquise				
Les Innocents	André Téchiné	Sandrine Bonnaire, Simon de La Brosse, Jean-Claude Brialy	Drama	
L' Inopiné				
Irena et les ombres	Alain Robak	Farid Chopel, Denise Virieux, Jean-Louis Foulquier	Crime	
Jenatsch	Daniel Schmid	Christine Boisson, Vittorio Mezzogiorno	Drama, fantasy	Swiss-French co-production
Jeux d'artifices	Virginie Thévenet	Myriam David, Gaël Seguin, Ludovic Henry	Comedy	
Le Journal d'un fou	Roger Coggio	Charles Charras, Marc Cholodenko, Roger Coggio	Comedy drama	
Le Jupon rouge	Geneviève Lefebvre	Marie-Christine Barrault, Alida Valli, Guillemette Grobon	Drama	
Keep Your Right Up	Jean-Luc Godard	Jean-Luc Godard, Jacques Villeret, François Périer	Comedy	
Lévy et Goliath	Gérard Oury	Richard Anconina, Michel Boujenah, Jean-Claude Brialy	Comedy	
Macbeth	Claude d'Anna	Leo Nucci, Shirley Verrett, Johan Leysen	Musical	French–West German co-production
A Man in Love	Diane Kurys	Greta Scacchi, Peter Coyote, Claudia Cardinale	Drama	French–Italian co-production
Man on Fire	Élie Chouraqui	Scott Glenn, Brooke Adams, Jade Malle		Italian–French co-production
Lévy et Goliath	Gérard Oury	Richard Anconina, Michel Boujenah, Jean-Claude Brialy	Comedy	
Mascara	Patrick Conrad	Charlotte Rampling, Michael Sarrazin, Derek de Lint	Thriller	Belgian-Dutch–French co-production
Masks	Claude Chabrol	Philippe Noiret, Robin Renucci, Bernadette Lafont	Thriller	
The Miracle	Jean-Pierre Mocky	Michel Serrault, Jean Poiret, Jeanne Moreau	Comedy	
Pierre and Djemila	Gérard Blain	Jean-Pierre André, Nadja Reski, Abdelkader	Drama	
Revenge of the Living Dead Girls	Pierre B. Reinhard	Laurence Mercier, Patrick Guillemin	Horror	
Le Solitaire	Jacques Deray	Jean-Paul Belmondo, Jean-Pierre Malo, Michel Creton	Thriller, action	
Terminus	Pierre William Glenn	Johnny Hallyday, Karen Allen, Jürgen Prochnow	Science fiction	French–West German co-production
Ubu et la Grande Gidouille	Jan Lenica	—N/a	—N/a	
Under the Sun of Satan	Maurice Pialat	Gérard Depardieu, Sandrine Bonnaire, Maurice Pialat	Drama	
Wings of Desire	Wim Wenders	Bruno Ganz, Solveig Dommartin, Otto Sander	Fantasy	West German–French co-production T
