= 1999 Cannes Film Festival =

- Official poster of the 52nd Cannes Film Festival featuring an original illustration by Jean-Pierre Gendis.
- Opening film: The Barber of Siberia
- Closing film: An Ideal Husband
- Location: Cannes, France
- Founded: 1946
- Awards: Palme d'Or: Rosetta
- Hosted by: Kristin Scott Thomas
- No. of films: 22 (In Competition)
- Festival date: 12 May 1999 – 23 May 1999
- Website: festival-cannes.com/en

Cannes Film Festival
- 2000 1998

The 52nd Cannes Film Festival took place from 12 to 23 May 1999. Canadian filmmaker David Cronenberg served as jury president for the main competition. Kristin Scott Thomas was the host for the opening and closing ceremonies.

Belgian filmmakers Jean-Pierre and Luc Dardenne won the Palme d'Or, the festival's top prize, for the drama film Rosetta.

The festival opened with The Barber of Siberia by Nikita Mikhalkov, and closed with An Ideal Husband by Oliver Parker.

1999 Un Certain Regard poster, adapted from an original illustration by Assane N' Doye.

== Juries ==
=== Main competition ===
- David Cronenberg, Canadian filmmaker - Jury President
- Dominique Blanc, French actress
- Doris Dörrie, German filmmaker and producer
- Jeff Goldblum, American actor
- Barbara Hendricks, American singer
- Holly Hunter, American actress
- George Miller, Australian filmmaker
- Maurizio Nichetti, Italian filmmaker and actor.
- Yasmina Reza, French actor and writer
- André Téchiné, French filmmaker

=== Un Certain Regard ===
- Lambert Wilson, French actor - Jury President
- Irène Bignardi, critic
- Annie Coppermann, critic
- Thierry Gandillot, critic
- Jonathan Romney, critic
- Laurent Tirard, French filmmaker

=== Cinéfondation and Short Films Competition ===
- Thomas Vinterberg, Danish filmmaker - Jury President
- Cédric Klapisch, French filmmaker
- Virginie Ledoyen, French actress
- Walter Salles, Brazilian filmmaker
- Greta Scacchi, Italian-Austrian actress

=== Camera d'Or ===
- Michel Piccoli, French actor - Jury President
- Jean-Pierre Beauviala
- Cherifa Chabane, critic
- Caroline Champetier, French cinematographer:
- Paola Malanga, critic
- José Maria Riba, critic
- Marie Vermillard, director
- Peter Von Bagh, Finnish film historian and director

== Official Selection ==
=== In Competition ===
The following feature films competed for the Palme d'Or:

English title	Original title	Director(s)	Production country
8½ Women		Peter Greenaway	United Kingdom, Netherlands, Luxembourg, Germany
All About My Mother	Todo sobre mi madre	Pedro Almodóvar	Spain, France
Cradle Will Rock		Tim Robbins	United States
The Emperor and the Assassin	荊軻刺秦王	Chen Kaige	China
Felicia's Journey		Atom Egoyan	United Kingdom, Canada
Ghost Dog: The Way of the Samurai		Jim Jarmusch	United States, France, Germany, Japan
Humanité	L'humanité	Bruno Dumont	France
Kadosh	קדוש	Amos Gitai	France, Israel
Kikujiro	菊次郎の夏	Takeshi Kitano	Japan
The Letter	La lettre / A Carta	Manoel de Oliveira	France, Portugal
Limbo		John Sayles	United States
Love Will Tear Us Apart	天上人間	Nelson Yu Lik-wai	Hong Kong
Moloch	Молох	Alexander Sokurov	Russia
The Nanny	La balia	Marco Bellocchio	Italy
No One Writes to the Colonel	El coronel no tiene quien le escriba	Arturo Ripstein	Mexico, Spain, France
Our Happy Lives	Nos vies heureuses	Jacques Maillot	France
Pola X		Leos Carax	France, Switzerland, Germany, Japan
Rosetta		Jean-Pierre Dardenne and Luc Dardenne	Belgium, France
The Straight Story		David Lynch	United States, United Kingdom, France
Tales of Kish	قصه‌های کیش	Abolfazl Jalili, Mohsen Makhmalbaf and Nasser Taghvai	Iran
Time Regained	Le temps retrouvé, d'après l'oeuvre de Marcel Proust	Raúl Ruiz	France, Italy, Portugal
Wonderland		Michael Winterbottom	United Kingdom

=== Un Certain Regard ===
The following films were selected for the competition of Un Certain Regard:

English title	Original title	Director(s)	Production country
Away with Words	三條人	Christopher Doyle	Hong Kong, Japan
Beautiful People		Jasmin Dizdar	United Kingdom
Beresina, or the Last Days of Switzerland	Beresina oder Die letzten Tage der Schweiz	Daniel Schmid	Switzerland, Germany, Austria
Genesis	La genèse	Cheick Oumar Sissoko	Mali, France
Harem Suare		Ferzan Özpetek	Turkey, Italy, France
If I Give You my Humbleness, Don't Take Away my Pride		Karin Westerlund	Denmark, Sweden
Judy Berlin		Eric Mendelsohn	United States
Kaizokuban Bootleg Film	海賊版	Masahiro Kobayashi	Japan
March of Happiness	天馬茶房	Lin Cheng-sheng	Taiwan
Nadia and the Hippos	Nadia et les hippopotames	Dominique Cabrera	France
New Dawn	Peau neuve	Émilie Deleuze	France
Olympic Garage	Garage Olimpo	Marco Bechis	Argentina, France, Italy
The Other	الآخر	Youssef Chahine	Egypt, France
The Passengers	Les passagers	Jean-Claude Guiguet	France
The Personals	徵婚啓事	Chen Kuo-fu	Taiwan
Ratcatcher		Lynne Ramsay	United Kingdom, France
The Shade		Raphaël Nadjari	United States
Sicilia!		Jean-Marie Straub and Danièle Huillet	Italy, France, Germany
So Close to Paradise	扁担·姑娘	Wang Xiaoshuai	China
The Spousals of God	As Bodas de Deus	João César Monteiro	Portugal
Throne of Death	Marana Simhasanam	Murali Nair	India
Vanaprastham	Vanaprastham: La Dernière Danse	Shaji N. Karun	France, India
The Winslow Boy		David Mamet	United States

=== Out of Competition ===
The following films were selected to be screened out of competition:

English title	Original title	Director(s)	Production country
The Barber of Siberia (opening film)	Сибирский цирюльник	Nikita Mikhalkov	Russia, France, Italy, Czech Republic, United States
Dogma		Kevin Smith	United States
EDtv		Ron Howard	United States
Entrapment		Jon Amiel	United States, United Kingdom, Germany
Farewell, Home Sweet Home	Adieu, plancher des vaches!	Otar Iosseliani	France
An Ideal Husband (closing film)		Oliver Parker	United Kingdom
The Limey		Steven Soderbergh	United States
My Best Fiend	Mein liebster Feind	Werner Herzog	Germany

=== Cinéfondation ===
The following films were selected for the competition of Cinéfondation:

- Baballoon (Babalon) by Michal Zabka
- Cambi e Scambi by Donata Pizzato
- The Clock by Noah Laracy
- Dimanche by Fabrice Aragno
- The Execution by Lee In-Kyun
- Fish 073 (Ryba 073) by Vaclav Svankmajer
- Germania by Kris Krikellis
- Im Hukim (With Rules) by Dover Kosashvili
- Inter-View by Jessica Hausner
- Ked Nie, Tak Nie by Vladimir Kral
- Layover by Shen Ko-Shang
- Der Linkshander by Iouri Kouzine
- Little Big Dog by Bo Hagen Clausen
- Milk by Mairi Cameron
- La Puce by Emmanuelle Bercot
- Runt by Jesse Lawrence
- Second Hand by Emily Young
- Waxandwane by Axel Koenzen
- Wojtek by David Turner
- Yumeji Ningyo (Doll of Dreams) by Yamazaki Tatsuji

=== Short Films Competition ===
The following short films competed for the Short Film Palme d'Or:

- Billy's Balloon by Don Hertzfeldt
- The Cookie Thief by Hugo Currie, Toby Leslie
- Devil Doll by Jarl Olsen
- An Eternity by Daehyun Kim
- Food for Thought by John Paton, Matthew Ross
- Husk by Jerry Handler
- Le Pique-Nique by Il-Gon Song
- Rien Dire by Vincent Pérez (France)
- Roulette by Roberto Santiago
- Simultaneity by Seong Sook Kim
- Stop by Rodolphe Marconi
- When the Day Breaks by Amanda Forbis, Wendy Tilby

== Parallel sections ==
=== International Critics' Week ===
The following films were screened for the 38th International Critics' Week (38e Semaine de la Critique):

Feature film competition

- 7/25 (Nana-ni-go) by Wataru Hayakawa (Japan)
- Flores de otro mundo by Icíar Bollaín (Spain)
- Hold Back the Night by Phil Davis (United Kingdom)
- On Board (Gemide) by Serdar Akar (Turkey)
- Siam Sunset by John Polson (Australia)
- Strange Fits of Passion by Elise McCredie (Australia)
- The White Suit (Belo odelo) by Lazar Ristovski (FR Yugoslavia)

Short film competition

- The Circle (Dayereh) by Mohammad Shirvani (Iran)
- Dérapages by Pascal Adant (Belgium)
- Fuzzy Logic by Tom Krueger (United States)
- The Good Son by Sean McGuire (United Kingdom)
- La Leçon du jour by Irène Sohm (France)
- More by Mark Osborne (United States)
- Shoes Off! by Mark Sawers (Canada)

=== Directors' Fortnight ===
The following films were screened for the 1999 Directors' Fortnight (Quinzaine des Réalizateurs):

- A mort la mort ! by Romain Goupil
- Agnes Browne by Anjelica Huston
- The Blair Witch Project by Daniel Myrick, Eduardo Sánchez
- Le Bleu des villes by Stéphane Brizé
- Charisma by Kiyoshi Kurosawa
- Un château en Espagne by Delphine Gleize
- Les Convoyeurs attendent by Benoît Mariage
- The Cup (Phörpa) by Khyentse Norbu
- Darkness and Light (Hei An Zhi Guang) by Chang Tso-Chi
- East Is East by Damien O'Donnell
- El entusiasmo by Ricardo Larraín
- Fever by Alex Winter
- The Five Senses by Jeremy Podeswa
- Haut les cœurs! by Sólveig Anspach
- Kiemas by Valdas Navasaitis
- The Last September by Deborah Warner
- M/Other by Nobuhiro Suwa
- Qui plume la lune ? by Christine Carrière
- Scenery by Zhao Jisong
- Sud by Chantal Akerman
- Summer of Sam by Spike Lee
- The Virgin Suicides by Sofia Coppola
- The War Zone by Tim Roth
- Voyages by Emmanuel Finkiel
- Paths in the Night by Andreas Kleinert

Short films

- Le Franc by Djibril Diop Mambety (45 min.)
- Marée haute by Caroline Champetier (17 min.)
- Un petit air de fête by Eric Guirado (35 min.)
- La Petite Vendeuse de Soleil (or The Little Girl Who Sold the Sun) by Djibril Diop Mambety (45 min.)
- Le Premier pas by Florence Vignon (23 min.)
- La Tentation de l'innocence by Fabienne Godet (43 min.)
- O Trouble by Sylvia Calle (10 min.)

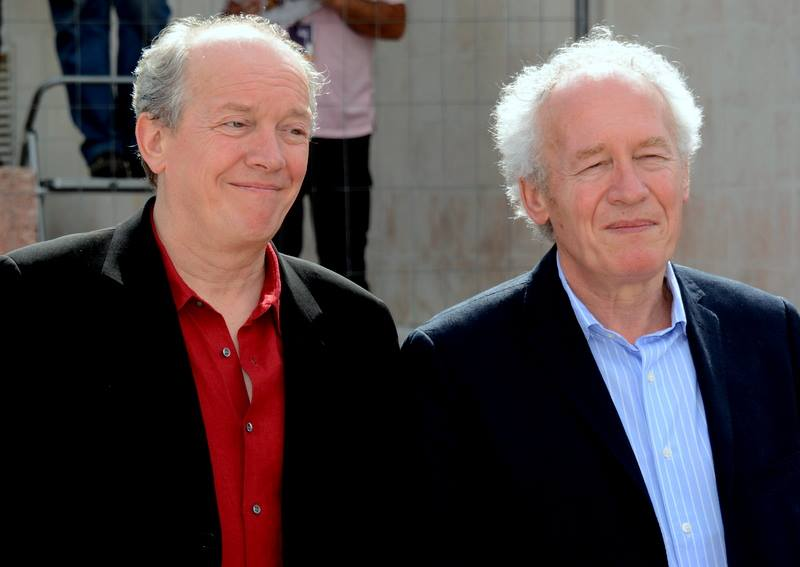
Luc Dardenne (left) and Jean-Pierre Dardenne, Palme d'Or winners

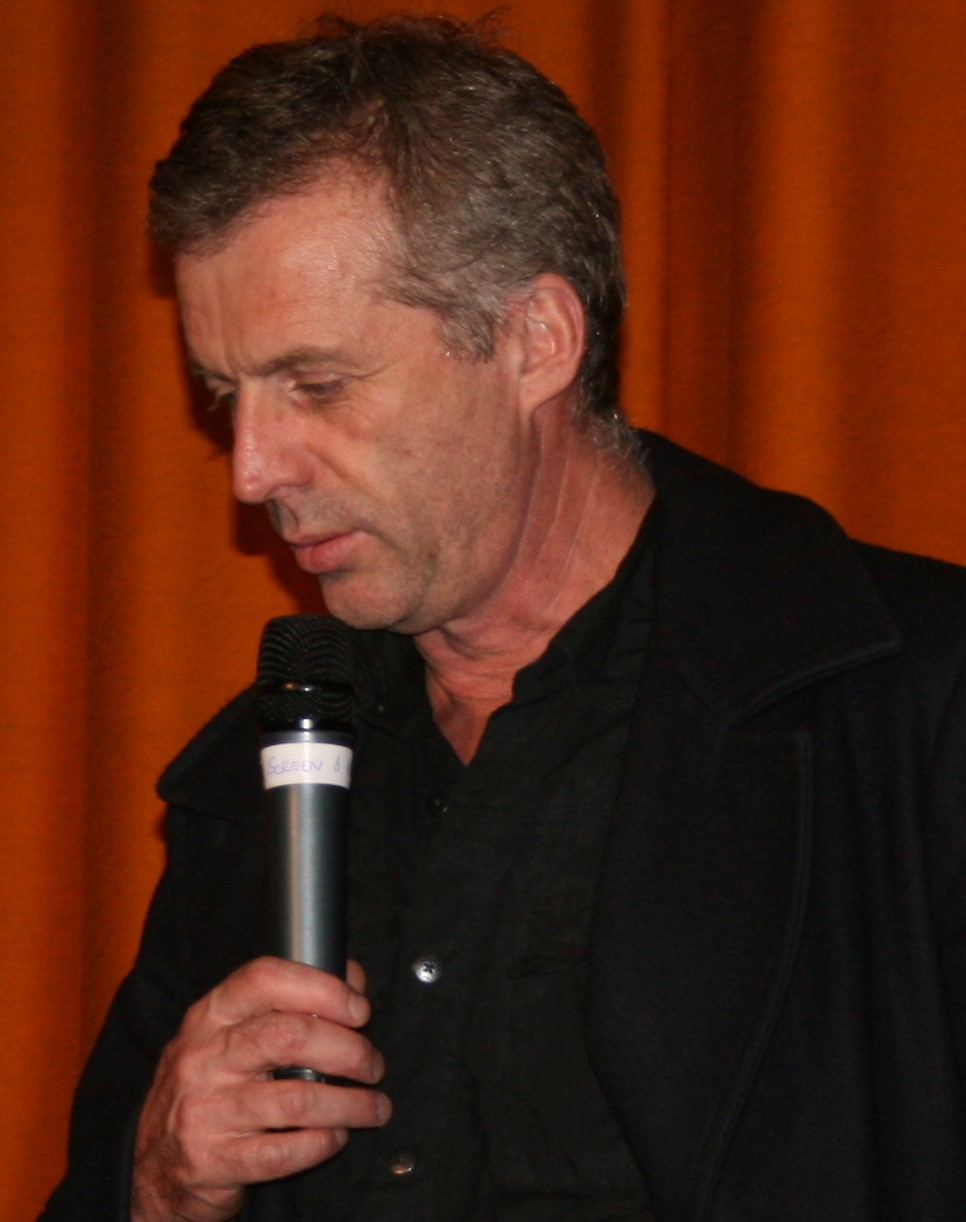
Bruno Dumont, Gran Prix winner

== Official Awards ==
=== In Competition ===
- Palme d'Or: Rosetta by Jean-Pierre and Luc Dardenne
- Grand Prix: Humanité by Bruno Dumont
- Best Director: Pedro Almodóvar for All About My Mother
- Best Screenplay: Moloch by Yuri Arabov
- Best Actress:
  - Séverine Caneele for Humanité
  - Émilie Dequenne for Rosetta
- Best Actor: Emmanuel Schotté for Humanité
- Jury Prize: The Letter by Manoel de Oliveira

=== Un Certain Regard ===
- Beautiful People by Jasmin Dizdar

=== Cinéfondation ===
- First Prize: Second Hand by Emily Young
- Second Prize:
  - Im Hukim by Dover Koshashvili
  - La puce by Emmanuelle Bercot
- Third Prize: Little Big Dog by Bo Hagen Clausen
  - Special Mention: Inter-View by Jessica Hausner

=== Caméra d'Or ===
- Marana Simhasanam by Murali Nair

=== Short Film Palme d'Or ===
- When the Day Breaks by Wendy Tilby and Amanda Forbis
- Jury Prize:
  - Stop by Rodolphe Marconi
  - Le Pique-Nique by Il-Gon Song

== Independent Awards ==
=== FIPRESCI Prizes ===
- New Dawn by Émilie Deleuze
- M/Other by Nobuhiro Suwa (Directors' Fortnight)

=== Commission Supérieure Technique ===
- Technical Grand Prize: Juhua Tu (production design) in The Emperor and the Assassin

=== Prize of the Ecumenical Jury ===
- All About My Mother by Pedro Almodóvar
  - Special Mention: Rosetta by Jean-Pierre and Luc Dardenne

=== Award of the Youth ===
- Foreign Film: The Blair Witch Project by Daniel Myrick and Eduardo Sánchez
- French Film: Voyages by Emmanuel Finkiel

=== International Critics' Week ===
- Mercedes-Benz Award: Flowers from Another World by Icíar Bollaín
- Canal+ Award: Shoes Off! by Mark Sawers
- Grand Golden Rail: Siam Sunset by John Polson
- Little Golden Rail: Derapages by Pascal Adant

=== Directors' Fortnight ===
- Kodak Short Film Award: Un petit air de fête by Eric Guirado
- Kodak Short Film Award – Special Mention: Ô trouble by Sylvia Calle
- C.I.C.A.E. Award: Qui plume la lune? by Christine Carrière
- Gras Savoye Award: Un château en Espagne by Delphine Gleize

=== François Chalais Award ===
- The Other by Youssef Chahine

== Media ==
- INA: Opening of the 1999 Festival (commentary in French)
- INA: List of winners of the 1999 festival (commentary in French)
