= A Week's Vacation =

1980 film

- DVD cover
- Directed by: Bertrand Tavernier
- Written by: Bertrand Tavernier; Marie-Françoise Hans; Colo Tavernier
- Produced by: Christine Gozlan; Bertrand Tavernier
- Starring: Nathalie Baye
- Cinematography: Pierre-William Glenn
- Edited by: Armand Psenny
- Music by: Pierre Papadiamandis
- Distributed by: Parafrance
- Release date: 2 June 1980
- Running time: 102 minutes
- Country: France
- Language: French
- Box office: $7.1 million

A Week's Vacation (French: Une semaine de vacances) is a 1980 French drama film directed by Bertrand Tavernier. It was entered into the 1980 Cannes Film Festival.

== Synopsis ==
31 year old Laurence has reached a breaking point as a public school teacher in Lyon and at a crossroads in her relationship with her boyfriend, Pierre. At her doctor's direction, she takes a week off from work to recover. She feels pressured by everyone around her to continue to teach, but it no longer makes her as happy as it once did.

== Cast ==
- Nathalie Baye - Laurence Cuers
- Gérard Lanvin - Pierre
- Flore Fitzgerald - Anne
- Michel Galabru - Mancheron
- Jean Dasté - Le père de Laurence
- Marie-Louise Ebeli - La mère de Laurence
- Philippe Delaigue - Jacques, le frère de Laurence
- Geneviève Vauzeilles - Lucie
- Philippe Léotard - Le docteur Sabouret
- Philippe Noiret - Michel Descombes
- Jean-Claude Durand - Philippe
- Catherine Anne Duperray - Josiane Lalande, le professeur chahuté (as Catherine-Anne Duperray)
- Jean Sourbier - André
- André Mortamais - Le client
- Thierry Herbivo - Jean Mancheron
- Nils Tavernier - Patrice

== Notes ==
Philippe Noiret's Michel Descombes was the protagonist of Tavernier's feature debut, The Clockmaker (1974).

== Critical reception ==
Stanley Kauffmann of The New Republic wrote- "What holds this film together are the characterizations and Tavernier's skill and authenticity. The people are not startlingly original or profoundly drawn; they are completely credible, therefore interesting.
