= Jacques Bunel =

Jacques Bunel may refer to:

- Jacob Bunel (1568–1614), French painter
- Père Jacques (1900–1945), French priest, victim of the Nazis
