= Jean-Paul Comart =

Belgian actor

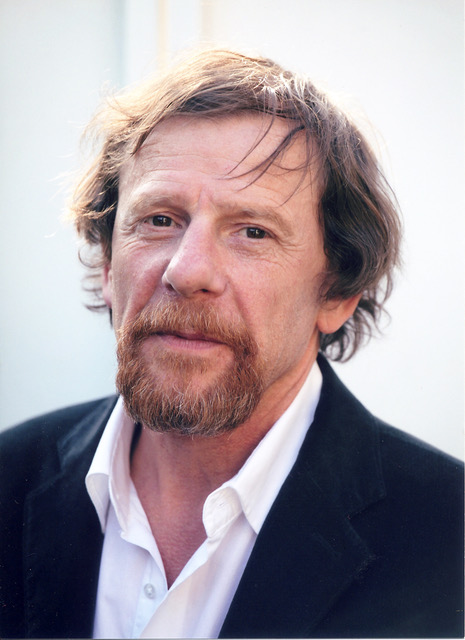
- Jean-Paul Comart
- Born: 27 September 1953 (age 73); Tournai, Belgium
- Occupation: Actor
- Years active: 1980–present

Jean-Paul Comart (French: [ʒɑ̃ pɔl kɔmaʁ]; born 27 September 1953) is a Belgian actor best known for his appearances in French film in the 1980s. He has appeared in films, TV and in the theatre.

Since 2000, Comart has mostly appeared on television, playing Inspector Miller in the series Trois femmes flics amongst other roles.

== Theater ==
| Year | Title | Author | Director |
|---|---|---|---|
| 1980 | The Miser | Molière | André Debaar |
| 1987 | Aller-retour | Jean-Paul Comart | Jean-Paul Comart |
| 1988 | Woyzeck | Georg Büchner | Daniel Benoin |
| 1992 | Tartuffe | Molière | Micheline Hardy |
| 1994 | Les libertins | Roger Planchon | Roger Planchon |
| 1997 | Le faiseur | Honoré de Balzac | François Petit |
| 1998 | Une fille de Dublin | John Barlowe | John Barlowe |
| 1999 | Closer | Adrian Brine | Adrian Brine |
| 2007 | Démocratie | Jean-Luc Tardieu | Jean-Luc Tardieu |
| 2010-12 | Henri IV, le bien aimé | Daniel Colas | Daniel Colas |

== Filmography ==
| Year | Title | Role | Director | Notes |
|---|---|---|---|---|
| 1980 | Prune des bois | | Marc Lobet | |
| 1981 | Les roues de la fortune | Romain | Teff Erhat | TV Mini-Series |
| 1981 | Salut champion | Pasquier | Just Jaeckin | TV Series (1 Episode) |
| 1982 | La Balance | The Belgian | Bob Swaim | Nominated - César Award for Most Promising Actor |
| 1982 | Meurtres à domicile | Inspector Willemsen | Marc Lobet (2) | |
| 1983 | Vous habitez chez vos parents ? | Georges Gourdiguenave | Michel Fermaud | |
| 1985 | Scout toujours... | The chaplain | Gérard Jugnot | |
| 1985 | Requiem pour un fumeur | The man | Frédéric Sojcher | Short |
| 1985 | Via Mala | Georg Gumpers | Tom Toelle | TV Mini-Series |
| 1986 | Paris minuit | Alexis | Frédéric Andréi | |
| 1986 | Je hais les acteurs | Bizzel | Gérard Krawczyk | |
| 1986 | États d'âme | A new poor | Jacques Fansten | |
| 1986 | Azizah, la fille du fleuve | | Patrick Jamain | TV Series (1 Episode) |
| 1987 | Club de rencontres | Bernard Lognon | Michel Lang | |
| 1987 | Carnaval | Robert | Ronny Coutteure | |
| 1987 | La fille de la haute dune | Philippe | Eric Stofkooper | Short |
| 1987 | Marc et Sophie | | Georges Bensoussan | TV Series (1 Episode) |
| 1989 | Life and Nothing But | Fagot | Bertrand Tavernier | |
| 1989 | L'auscultation | | Christian Le Hémonet | Short |
| 1990 | Tumultes | Yves | Bertrand Van Effenterre | |
| 1990 | Un été après l'autre | Francis | Anne-Marie Etienne | |
| 1990 | Ice-cream et châtiment | The father | Christian Le Hémonet (2) | Short |
| 1990 | La porte d'or | David's lawyer | Michel Vianey | TV Movie |
| 1990 | Le Gorille | Soufflant | Édouard Molinaro | TV Series (1 Episode) |
| 1991 | Lola Zipper | Gérard | Ilan Duran Cohen | |
| 1991 | Casino | | Gil Bauwens | Short |
| 1992 | L.627 | Dodo | Bertrand Tavernier (2) | |
| 1992 | Faut pas rêver | | Michel Thibaud | Short |
| 1992 | Sabine j'imagine | Royer | Dennis Berry | TV Movie |
| 1993 | Un crime | Dunand's assistant | Jacques Deray | |
| 1993 | Dressing Room | | Jean-Pierre Pozzi | Short |
| 1993 | Jenny Marx, la femme du diable | Friedrich Engels | Michel Wyn | TV Movie |
| 1993 | Pour demain | Antoine | Fabrice Cazeneuve | TV Movie |
| 1994 | Balthazar | Narrator | Christophe Fraipont | Short |
| 1994 | Comme un frère | | Pascal Laëthier | Short |
| 1994 | Julie Lescaut | Santi | Élisabeth Rappeneau & Josée Dayan | TV Series (2 Episodes) |
| 1995 | The Bait | Michel | Bertrand Tavernier (3) | |
| 1995 | Sans souci | | Jean-Michel Isabel | Short |
| 1995 | Vroum-vroum | | Frédéric Sojcher (2) | Short |
| 1995 | Carreau d'as | | Laurent Carcélès | TV Movie |
| 1995 | C'est mon histoire | Yves | Agnès Delarive | TV Series (1 Episode) |
| 1996 | XY, drôle de conception | Paul | Jean-Paul Lilienfeld | |
| 1996 | Saint-Exupéry: La dernière mission | Guillaumet | Robert Enrico | TV Movie |
| 1996 | Le rêve d'Esther | Doctor Gaudin | Jacques Otmezguine | TV Movie |
| 1996 | Le neuvième jour | Frantz Hartmann | David Delrieux | TV Movie |
| 1996 | La peau du chat | The inspector | Jacques Otmezguine (2) | TV Movie |
| 1996 | La femme de la forêt | Julien | Arnaud Sélignac | TV Mini-Series |
| 1997 | Amour & confusions | | Patrick Braoudé | |
| 1997 | Bruits d'amour | Marc | Jacques Otmezguine (4) | |
| 1997 | Aventurier malgré lui | Godard | Marc Rivière | TV Movie |
| 1997 | Le pantalon | Lt. André | Yves Boisset | TV Movie |
| 1997 | Joséphine, ange gardien | Richard | Dominique Baron | TV Series (1 Episode) |
| 1997 | Docteur Sylvestre | Gilles | Igaal Niddam | TV Series (1 Episode) |
| 1997 | Quai n° 1 | Michel Fournier | André Buytaers | TV Series (1 Episode) |
| 1997 | Ärzte | | Hartmut Griesmayr | TV Series (2 Episodes) |
| 1998 | Pension des oiseaux | | Dominique Champetier | Short |
| 1998 | Week-end ! | François | Arnaud Sélignac (2) | TV Movie |
| 1998 | Les pédiatres | Dr. Franck Holm | Daniel Losset & Hartmut Griesmayr (2) | TV Mini-Series |
| 1999 | Un chat dans la gorge | | Jacques Otmezguine (4) | |
| 1999 | Destination Londres | Frank | Pascal Adant | Short |
| 1999 | Cruel été | Monsieur T | Nicolas Goetschel | Short |
| Sam | Martin | Yves Boisset (2) | TV Movie | |
| 2000 | Julien l'apprenti | Angelo | Jacques Otmezguine (5) | TV Movie |
| 2001 | Regarde-moi | | Frédéric Sojcher (3) | |
| 2001 | Boum ! | The bomb | Pascal Adant | Short |
| 2002 | Same Player, Shoot Again | Benoît | Jean Berthier | Short |
| 2002 | La dame de la plage | Antoine | Paule Sardou | Short |
| 2002 | Qui mange quoi ? | Marc Lantier | Jean-Paul Lilienfeld (2) | TV Movie |
| 2002 | La victoire des vaincus | Louis | Nicolas Picard | TV Movie |
| 2003 | Chouchou | Commissioner Molino | Merzak Allouache | |
| 2003 | La deuxième vérité | Commissioner Morini | Philippe Monnier | TV Movie |
| 2003 | De soie et de cendre | Henri Maurel | Jacques Otmezguine (6) | TV Movie |
| 2003 | Blague à part | Dr. McDonald | Pascal Chaumeil | TV Series (1 Episode) |
| 2003 | Blandine, l'insoumise | William Schattuck | Claude d'Anna | TV Series (1 Episode) |
| 2003 | Les Cordier, juge et flic | Philippe Koenig | Michaëla Watteaux | TV Series (1 Episode) |
| 2004 | Qui mange quand ? | Marc Lantier | Jean-Paul Lilienfeld (3) | TV Movie |
| 2005 | Le temps meurtrier | Louis Beaufort | Philippe Monnier (2) | TV Movie |
| 2005 | Commissaire Valence | Georges Vaillant | Patrick Grandperret | TV Series (1 Episode) |
| 2005 | Trois femmes flics | Inspector Miller | Philippe Triboit | TV Series (6 Episodes) |
| 2006 | Le juge est une femme | Castel | Eric Summer | TV Series (1 Episode) |
| 2008 | Beauties at War | The host | Patrice Leconte | |
| 2008 | Le sanglot des anges | Vals | Jacques Otmezguine (7) | TV Mini-Series |
| 2009 | Welcome | The rank | Philippe Lioret | |
| 2009 | Climax | The producer | Frédéric Sojcher (4) | Short |
| 2009 | La reine et le cardinal | Louis XIV | Marc Rivière (2) | TV Movie |
| 2009 | Fausses innocences | Dr. André Stembert | André Chandelle | TV Movie |
| 2009 | Nicolas Le Floch | Morande | Nicolas Picard (2) | TV Series (1 Episode) |
| 2010 | En apparence | Inspector Guérault | Benoît d'Aubert | TV Movie |
| 2011 | Amoureuse | Berthelin | Nicolas Herdt | TV Movie |
| 2011 | Louis XVI, l'homme qui ne voulait pas être roi | Charles Gravier | Thierry Binisti | TV Movie |
| 2011 | Julie Lescaut | Delerme | Thierry Petit | TV Series (1 Episode) |
| 2012 | The Suicide Shop | The bridges suicidal | Patrice Leconte (2) | |
| 2012 | Assassinée | Lieutenant Morand | Thierry Binisti (2) | TV Movie |
| 2012 | Interpol | | Eric Summer (2) | TV Series (1 Episode) |
| 2014 | Next Time I'll Aim for the Heart | Franck's father | Cédric Anger | |
| 2014 | Do Not Disturb | The seller | Patrice Leconte (3) | |
| 2014 | The Lies of the Victors | Jaali | Christoph Hochhäusler | |
| 2014 | La loi | Pierre Juillet | Christian Faure | TV Movie |
| 2015 | Candice Renoir | Pierre Dituci | Stéphane Malhuret | TV Series (1 Episode) |
