= Odette Laure =

French actress and singer (1917–2004)

- Born: Odette Yvonne Marie Dhommée; 28 February 1917; Paris, France
- Died: 10 June 2004 (aged 87); Paris, France
- Occupation: Actress
- Years active: 1950–2001

Odette Laure (born Odette Yvonne Marie Dhommée; 28 February 1917–10 June 2004) was a French actress and cabaret singer. She appeared in more than 50 films and television shows between 1950 and 2001. She was nominated for the César Award for Best Supporting Actress for Daddy Nostalgia (1990). She was born Odette Yvonne Marie Dhommée in Paris, where she died.

== Selected filmography ==
| Year | Title | Role | Director |
|---|---|---|---|
| 1950 | La Marie du port | Françoise | Marcel Carné |
| 1950 | Lady Paname | the mistress | Henri Jeanson |
| 1952 | Holiday for Henrietta | Valentine | Julien Duvivier |
| 1954 | Flesh and the Woman | Mario's girlfriend | Robert Siodmak |
| 1956 | Mitsou | Petite Chose | Jacqueline Audry |
| 1958 | School for Coquettes | Amélie | Jacqueline Audry |
| 1959 | Guinguette | Tartine | Jean Delannoy |
| 1983 | Le Braconnier de Dieu | The Musician | Jean-Pierre Darras |
| 1985 | Les Nanas | Christine's mother | Annick Lanoë |
| 1983-89 | Julien Fontanes, magistrat | Mémaine | |
| 1990 | Daddy Nostalgie | Miche | Bertrand Tavernier |
| 1991 | Maigret | Valentine Besson | Emil Sirotek |
| 1992 | Riens du tout | Madame Yvonne | Cédric Klapisch |
| 1999 | The Dilettante | Zoé de la Tresmondière | Pascal Thomas |

Odette Laure in 1957
