= Humanite =

Humanite may refer to:

- Humanité, a 1999 film directed by Bruno Dumont about a detective investigating a girl's murder
- L'Humanité, a communist affiliated newspaper based in Paris, France
- Ultra-Humanite, a supervillain appearing in stories published by DC Comics
