= New Dawn (film) =

1999 film

- Film poster
- Directed by: Émilie Deleuze
- Written by: Émilie Deleuze; Laurent Guyot; Guy Laurent
- Produced by: Simon Arnal
- Starring: Samuel Le Bihan
- Cinematography: Antoine Héberlé
- Edited by: Fabrice Rouaud
- Release date: 8 September 1999
- Running time: 96 minutes
- Country: France
- Language: French

New Dawn (French: Peau neuve) is a 1999 French drama film directed by Émilie Deleuze. It was screened in the Un Certain Regard section at the 1999 Cannes Film Festival.

== Cast ==
- Samuel Le Bihan - Alain
- Marcial Di Fonzo Bo - Manu
- Catherine Vinatier - Pascale
- Claire Nebout - Isabelle
- Fabien Lucciarini
- Candice Dufour
