= Bénédicte Liénard =

Belgian filmmaker (born 1965)

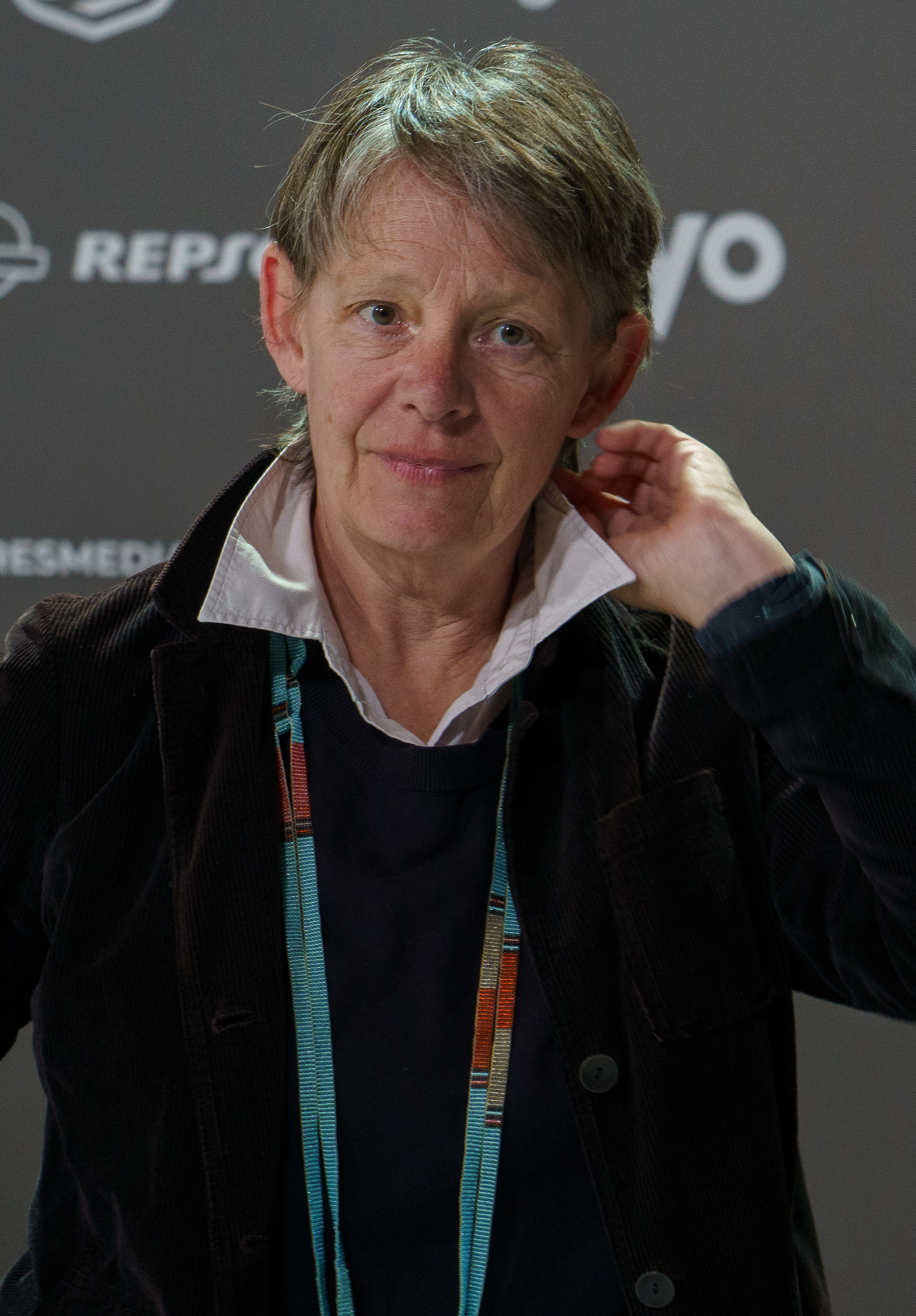
Liénard in 2025

Bénédicte Liénard (French pronunciation: [benedikt ljenaʁ]; born 25 April 1965 in Mons, Belgium) is a Belgian filmmaker.

== Biography ==
Benedicte Lienard studied at the Institut des Arts de Diffusion section realization cinema in Louvain-La-Neuve. At 24, she directed her first short film and then assistant director on films Jaco Van Dormael, Manu Bonmariage, Raymond Depardon, the Dardenne brothers. In 1997 and 98, it is dedicated to the creation of a workshop of expression through images and sound environment prison. The exhibition "Images free head" at the Museum of Photography in Charleroi gives see photos and videos of female inmates from the prison of Lantin. She is vice-president of the Belgian section of the International Observatory of Prisons.

== Notable films ==
- A Piece of Sky
- Toto the Hero
- Service compris
