= L.627 =

- Directed by: Bertrand Tavernier
- Written by: Bertrand Tavernier; Michel Alexandre
- Produced by: Alain Sarde; Frédéric Bourboulon
- Starring: Didier Bezace; Jean-Paul Comart; Charlotte Kady
- Cinematography: Alain Choquart
- Edited by: Ariane Boeglin
- Music by: Philippe Sarde
- Production companies: Canal+ Investimage 3 Les Films Alain Sarde; Little Bear; Sofiarp
- Distributed by: AMLF
- Release date: 9 September 1992
- Running time: 145 minutes
- Country: France
- Language: French
- Box office: $5.4 million

L.627 is a 1992 French film directed by Bertrand Tavernier.

== Plot ==
Lucien Marguet, nicknamed "Lulu" is an investigator of the second class in the judicial police in the Paris head office. He is a field officer, so passionate about his work that he sometimes sacrifices his family responsibilities with his wife, a doctor, and his ailing mother. After his superior cancels a drug stakeout so he can use the stakeout van to drive home, even though he has been drinking, Lulu shows his contempt for him in front of their colleagues and is thrown out of the brigade.

After a period dealing with minor public complaints in one suburban police precinct, he joins a suburban police team fighting drug trafficking. The film covers their operations, their relationships with colleagues and informants, and the challenge of working with insufficient equipment and supplies. Lulu is obsessed with getting results: others on the team are more interested in slacking off and enjoying themselves. He has few close acquaintances apart from a prostitute who is HIV positive and a drug addict whose prospects are limited.

== Cast ==
- Didier Bezace as Lucien 'Lulu' Marguet
- Jean-Paul Comart as Dodo
- Charlotte Kady as Marie
- Jean-Roger Milo as Manuel
- Nils Tavernier as Vincent
- Philippe Torreton as Antoine
- Lara Guirao as Cécile
- Cécile Garcia-Fogel as Kathy Marguet
- Claude Brosset as Adore
- Frédéric Pierrot as René
- François Levantal as Inspector
- Patrick Rocca as Inspector Caron
- Hervé Laudière as Inspector Biere
- Jacques Boudet as Raymond
- Fabrice Roux as Toulouse
- Jean-Luc Abel as J.P.
- Martial as Rambo
- Jacky Pratoussy as Mario
- Didier Castello as Willy
- Eric Dufay as Mr. Propre
- François Lescurat as Usher
- Eric Savin as Lefort
- Jean Odoutan as Mamadou Diop
- Jean-Claude Calon as Longuet
- Kamel Cherif as Said
- Bruno Raffaelli as Jaunet
- Jean Le Mouël as Aussenac
- Laurentine Milebo as Alimata
- Simone Pheto as Couliba
- Shérif Scouri as Norrodine
- Smaïl Mekki as Miloud
- Fathia Saïd as Malika
- Thierry Desroses as Saintonge
- Joséphine Kouam as Joséphine
- Isabelle Soimaud as Philomene
- Uche Aniagolu as Berthe

== Accolades ==
Year	Award	Category	Recipient	Result
1992	Venice Film Festival	Golden Lion	Bertrand Tavernier	Nominated
1993	César Award	Best Film	Bertrand Tavernier	Nominated
1993	César Award	Most Promising Actress	Charlotte Kady	Nominated
1993	César Award	Best Director	Bertrand Tavernier	Nominated
1993	César Award	Best Original Screenplay or Adaptation	Michel Alexandre & Bertrand Tavernier	Nominated
