= Sona Nair =

Indian actress

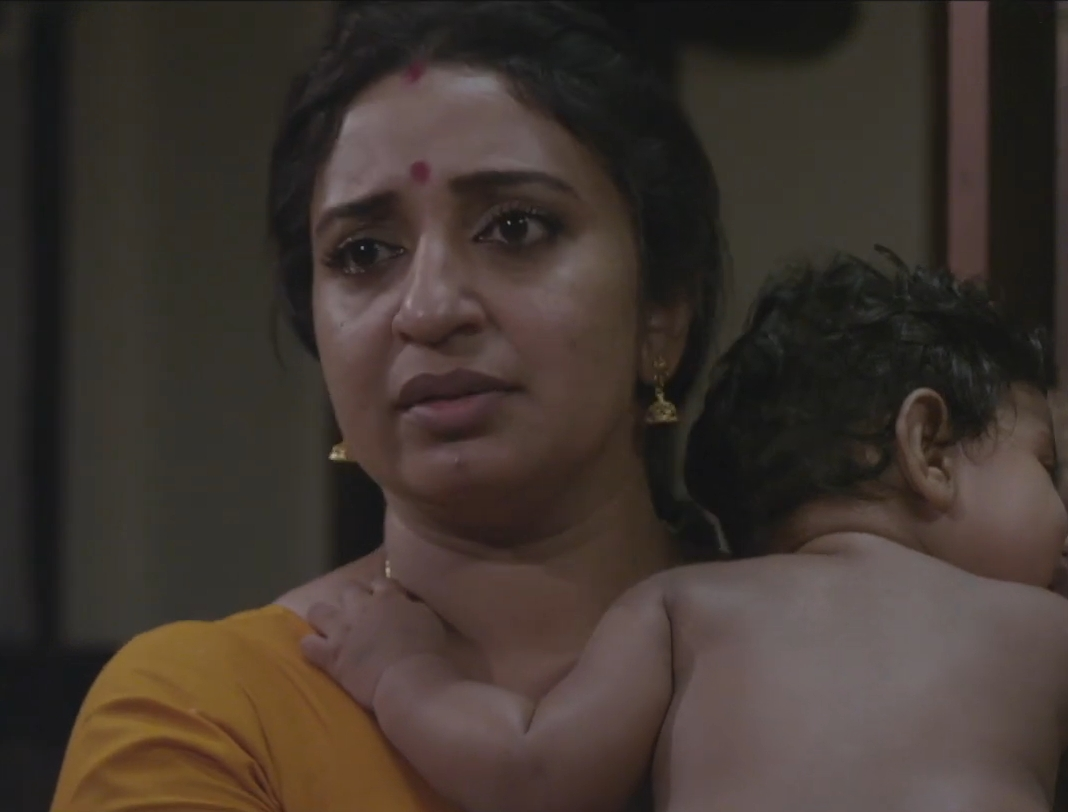
- Nair undergoing acting training at a theatre workshop in 2026.
- Born: Sona Nair; Trivandrum, Kerala
- Education: Government College for Women, Thiruvananthapuram
- Occupation: Actor
- Years active: 1996 – present
- Spouse: Udayan Ambaadi

Sona Nair is an Indian actress working mainly in Malayalam cinema who is also best known for her roles in television soaps.

== Personal life ==
Sona Nair attended Al-Uthuman Higher Secondary School, Kazhakoottam, Trivandrum, where her mother was a teacher. She received a degree from Government College for Women, Thiruvananthapuram.

She married Malayalam cinema cameraman Udayan Ambaadi in 1996.

== Career ==
Sona Nair got her first credited role in the 1996 film Thooval Kottaram. She then appeared in Katha Nayakan, Veendum Chila Veettukaryangal, Manassinakkare, Passenger and more.

== Awards and nominations ==
In 2004, Sona received the Best Actress Award in the "Kaveri Film Critics Television Awards" for her role in the telefilm Rachiyamma, telecast on Doordarshan. In 2006, she won the Best Supporting Actress award in both Kerala State TV Awards and telefilm category of Sathyan Memorial Awards, for her role in Amrita TV's Samasya.

== Filmography ==
=== Films ===
Year	Title	Role	Note
1986	T. P. Balagopalan M.A.	Singer of prayer group	Child Artist
1986	Thooval Kottaram	Hema	
1997	The Car	Beena	
1997	Katha Nayakan	Padmanabhan Nair's kin	
1997	Bhoopathi	Meera	
1999	The Godman	Ayisha	
1999	Veendum Chila Veettukaryangal	Sheela	
2000	Nadanpennum Naattupramaaniyum	Gayathri's sister	Extended Cameo
2000	Arayannangalude Veedu	Geetha	
2000	Kharaaksharangal	-	
2001	Dany	Anna	
2002	Neythukaran	Geetha	Won, Kerala State Film Award for Second Best Actress
2002	Kanal Kireedam	Soosie	
2003	Arimpara	Suma	
2003	Kasthooriman	Raji	
2003	Varum Varunnu Vannu	Saramma	
2003	Ivar	Mrs.Hakkim	
2003	Pattanathil Sundaran	Shalini Sasidharan	
2003	Manassinakkare	Sherin	
2004	Udayam	Lalitha	
2004	Pravaasam	Amminikutty	
2004	Kanninum Kannadikkum	Radha	
2004	Vettam	Gopalakrishnan's sister	
2004	Black	Sheela	
2005	Naran	Kunnumal Santha	
2006	Malamaal Weekly	Lilaram's wife	Hindi Film
2006	Vadakkumnadhan	Latha	
2006	Raashtram	Thommi's sister	
2006	Achante Ponnumakkal	Meenakshi	
2006	Vasthavam	Pattam Raveendran's wife	
2007	July 4	Gokul's mother	Extended Cameo
2007	Hello	Liza	Extended Cameo
2007	Kanna	Lady teacher	Tamil Film
2007	Naalu Pennungal	Street lady	"Segment : The Prostitute"
2007	Paradesi	Nabeesa	
2007	Avan Chandiyude Makan	Susanna	
2008	Pachamarathanalil	Beena	
2008	Veruthe Oru Bharya	Sugunan's superior officer	
2008	Sound of Boot	Rahul Krishna's mother	
2009	Shudharil Shudhan	Panki	
2009	Angel John	Sofiya's mother	
2009	Swantham Lekhakan	Dr. Malathi	
2009	Puthiya Mukham	Vanaja	
2009	Kadha, Samvidhanam Kunchakko	Kunchacko's sister	
2009	Passenger	Thankamma Rajan	Nominated:-Filmfare Award for Best Supporting Actress – Malayalam
2009	Sagar Alias Jacky Reloaded	Hari's wife	
2009	Kerala Cafe	-	A segment Makalku
2009	Venalmaram	Deaf & Dumb's mother	
2009	Meghatheertham	Parvathi	
2010	Sufi Paranja Katha	Mainumma	
2010	Rama Ravanan	Maya	
2010	Punyam Aham	Naarayanan Unni's elder sister	
2010	Nallavan	Prosecutor Rajalakshmi	
2010	The Waiting Room	Shop keeper	Hindi Film
2010	Oliver Twist	Nun	
2010	Plus Two	Mollikutty	
2011	Nadakame Ulakam	Remani	
2011	Sarkar Colony	Thankam	
2011	Pachuvum Kovalanum	Anna	
2012	Akam Porul	Teacher	
2012	Orange	Pullachi	
2012	Doctor Innocent aanu	Subha lakshmi	
2012	Bombay Mittayi		
2012	Kamaal Dhamaal Malamaal	Maria	Hindi Film
2013	English	Saly	
2013	Anavruthayaya Kaapalika	Rosamma	Short film
2013	Telugabbai	Seetha Mahalakshmi	Telugu Film
2013	Pakaram	Devu Nandan	
2013	Manikya Thamburattiyum Christmas Carolum	-	
2013	Kutteem Kolum	Indu's mother	
2013	Progress Report	Arundathi	
2013	Rangrezz	Devyani Deshpande	Hindi Film
2014	Konthayum Poonoolum	Sethu's wife	
2015	Sound Of Mortality	Elsy	Short film
2015	Perariyathavar	Rema	
2015	Ithinumappuram	Leela Dhanapalan	
2015	Rockstar	Mariya	
2015	Thilothama	Ayisha	
2015	Roopantharam	Ramani	
2016	Neril	Aisha	Short film
2016	White	Deepa Pradeep	
2016	Buddhanum Chaplinum Chirikkunnu	Indraguptan's sister	
2017	Kambhoji	Narayani	
2017	Nilavariyathe	Bhamini	
2017	My School	MP	
2018	Kaly	Zeenath	
2018	Kammara Sambhavam	Bose's wife	
2018	Mazhayathu		
2019	Padmavyoohathila Abhimanyu	Emily Miss	
2019	Muttayi Kallanum Mammaliyum	-	
2019	Kumbalangi Nights	Herself	Uncredited cameo Archive footage from Seetha Kalyanam
2019	Finals	Mini	
2020	Oru Vadakkan Pennu	Manjummel Rani	
2023	Pulimada	Molly	
2024	Jamalinte Punjiri	Vasanthi	
2024	Virunnu	Elizabeth	

=== Television ===
Year	Serial	Channel	Role	Notes
	Inakkam Pinakkam	Doordarshan		
	Angaadipaattu	DD Malayalam	Sasikala	
	Manalnagaram	DD Malayalam		
1997	Radhamritham	DD Malayalam		
	Makal	DD Malayalam	Shari	Telefilm
	Oru Kudayum Kunjipengalum	Doordarshan		
1999	Charulatha	Surya TV		
2000	Jwalayayi	DD Malayalam	Wahida	
2004	Thyagam	DD Malayalam	Leelamma	Telefilm
	Thoolika Souhrudham	Amrita TV		Telefilm
2004	Rachiamma	DD Malayalam	Rachiamma	Won, Best Actress Award at "Kaveri Film Critics Television Awards"
2005	Aalipazham	Surya TV		
2006	Samasya	Amrita TV		Won, Sathyan Memorial Awards2008 -Best Actress, Kerala State Television award 2006-Best Supporting Actress
2007	Punarjanmam	Surya TV	Sandhya	
2007	Velankanni Mathavu	Surya TV	Maria	
2007 – 2010	Ente Manasaputhri	Asianet	Sandhya	Won, Asianet Television awards 2008-Best Character Actress
2009 – 2012	Autograph	Asianet	Sethulakshmi	
2010	Devimahatmyam	Asianet	Sumangala	Won, Asianet Television awards 2011-Best Character Actress
2010	Kunjalimarakkar	Asianet	Yasoda	
2010	Rananganam	Jaihind TV	Contestant	
2011 – 2012	Rudraveena	Surya TV	Ambika / Ambalika	
2012	Ramayanam	Mazhavil Manorama	Kaikeyi	
2012	Sreeparvathiyude Padham	DD Malayalam	Sarada	Telefilm
2013	Makal	Surya TV	Vasundhara	
2014 – 2016	Punarjani	Surya TV	Dr. Aashalatha	
2015	Smart Show	Flowers TV	Participant	
2016 – 2017	Mangalyapattu	Mazhavil Manorama	Chandana Shetty/Lakshmi	
2017	Jagritha	Amrita TV	Ambika Devi	
2018	Malarvadi	Flowers TV	Bella	
2018 – 2021	Seetha Kalyanam	Asianet	Ambikadevi a.k.a. Saradananda Swamikal	
2019	Panchavadippalam	Flowers TV	Satyavathi	
2019 – 2020	Oridathoru Rajakumari	Surya TV	Urmila	
2020	Uyire (Season 1)	Colors Tamil	Veeralatchmi	Tamil serial
2020 – 2022	Velaikkaran	Star Vijay	Visalakshi	Tamil serial
2021	Bharathi kannamma	Star Vijay	Court judge	Tamil serial
2021	Parayam Nedam	Amrita TV	Participant	
2023	Chakkappazham	Flowers TV	Pashmaja	
2023	Anandharagam	Surya TV	Nirmala	Extended Cameo Appearance
2025–Present	Swayamvarapanthal	Surya TV	Padmam	

=== Web series ===
Year	Title	Role	Network	Notes
2020	Forbidden Love	Anamika's Friend	ZEE5	
