= A Piece of Sky (2002 film) =

2002 film

- French Poster
- Directed by: Bénédicte Liénard
- Written by: Bénédicte Liénard
- Produced by: Jacques Bidou; Marianne Dumoulin
- Starring: Séverine Caneele; Sophie Leboutte
- Cinematography: Helene louvart
- Edited by: Marie-Hélène Dozo
- Distributed by: Ad Vitam Distribution
- Release dates: May 2002 (Cannes); 4 September 2002 (Belgium); 18 September 2002 (France)
- Running time: 85 minutes
- Countries: France; Belgium
- Language: French
- Box office: $18,000

A Piece of Sky (French: Une part du ciel) is a 2002 French-Belgian drama film directed by Bénédicte Liénard. It was screened in the Un Certain Regard section at the 2002 Cannes Film Festival.

== Cast ==
- Séverine Caneele as Joanna
- Sophie Leboutte as Claudine
- Yolande Moreau as Madame Pasquier
- Josiane Stoléru as Mme. Picri
- Naïma Hirèche as Naima
- Annick Keusterman as Annick
- Gaëlle Müller as Laurette
- Béatrice Spiga as Bella
- Olivier Gourmet as Joanna's Lawyer
- André Wilms as Warden

== Production ==
Director Bénédicte Liénard said It was Bella (played by Béatrice Spiga, a real prisoner in her life) who showed Séverine Caneele the posture of the naked body search.
