= Confidentially Yours =

- Theatrical release poster
- French: Vivement dimanche !
- Directed by: François Truffaut
- Screenplay by: François Truffaut; Suzanne Schiffman; Jean Aurel
- Based on: The Long Saturday Night; 1962 novel by Charles Williams
- Produced by: Armand Barbault; François Truffaut
- Starring: Fanny Ardant; Jean-Louis Trintignant; Jean-Pierre Kalfon; Philippe Laudenbach; Philippe Morier-Genoud; Xavier Saint-Macary; Jean-Louis Richard; Caroline Sihol
- Cinematography: Néstor Almendros
- Edited by: Martine Barraqué
- Music by: Georges Delerue
- Production companies: Les Films du Carrosse; Films A2; Soprofilms
- Distributed by: Acteurs Auteurs Associés
- Release dates: 5 August 1983 (Locarno Festival); 10 August 1983 (France)
- Running time: 110 minutes
- Language: French
- Box office: 1,176,425 admissions (France)

Confidentially Yours (French: Vivement dimanche !; known as Finally, Sunday! in other English-speaking markets) is a 1983 French comedy mystery film directed by François Truffaut. Based on the 1962 novel The Long Saturday Night by American author Charles Williams, it tells the story of Julien Vercel (Jean-Louis Trintignant), an estate agent who is suspected of murdering his wife and her lover. As Vercel is hidden in his office, his secretary Barbara Becker (Fanny Ardant) investigates these suspicious murders. It was the last film directed by Truffaut before his death in October of the following year. The film had a total of 1,176,425 admissions in France and was the 39th highest-grossing film of the year.

== Plot ==
Julien Vercel, an estate agent in the south of France, is hunting for ducks by the lake, while a man named Massoulier, who hunts in the same area, is shot dead. Julien returns to his office unaware but is soon questioned by the police. He learns that he is the main suspect, because when he left the hunt, he saw Massoulier's parked car, turned its lights off to save the battery and closed one of the door upon which he left fingerprints. Furthermore, the deceased Massoulier and Julien's wife, Marie-Christine had a secret relationship. When he confronts his wife later at home, she nonchalantly confirms her adultery. While Marie-Christine hides, Julien is taken to the police station for a second interview but is released with the help of his lawyer, Clement, who drives him home. In the meantime, Marie-Christine is murdered.

Julien is now the prime suspect. In an effort to prove his innocence he wants to go to Nice, where his wife previously worked, but his secretary, Barbara Becker, argues that she should do the research on his behalf. She leaves cunningly when her boss falls asleep in the office. Barbara is secretly in love with her boss, whereas Julien seems to have been indifferent to her.

While Julien hides in his real estate office instead of surrendering to the police, Barbara, who travels to Nice, starts investigating the past life of Marie-Christine. She learns that Marie-Christine's real name was Josiane Kerbel, that she has been married to a gambler, and that she lost a great deal of money gambling on horses. She married Vercel only to avoid drowning in debts.

The tracks lead Barbara and Julien to a movie theater, then to a night club, and from there to the dark labyrinths of the prostitution area. Barbara and Julien mistakenly assault a suspicious man, believing him to be the real killer. It is revealed that he is, in fact, Massoulier’s priest brother. At the theatre, a box office clerk and former lover of Massoulier's, who accused Julien of murder on the phone, is stabbed to death.

Barbara returns from Julien’s lawyer’s office, where she went at her wits' end and finally found out the truth. She starts talking with a police officer.

Barbara goes back to Julien, to whom she confesses her love. She prevents him from escaping with his lawyer and the police arrest him. The lawyer smells the trap based on the sound recording at the last minute, and commits suicide in a telephone booth after having admitted everything on the phone, when he sees the approaching cops. Clement and Marie-Christine were lovers; he killed Massoulier because Marie-Christine asked him to, he killed her because she did not want to divorce Julien, he killed the clerk because she knew everything, and he would have killed Julien after that.

Julien and Barbara acknowledge their love and are married by Massoulier's brother, who is a priest.

== Cast ==
- Fanny Ardant as Barbara Becker, Julien's secretary
- Jean-Louis Trintignant as Julien Vercel, estate agent
- Jean-Pierre Kalfon as Massoulier's brother, a priest
- Philippe Laudenbach as Maître Clément, Julien's lawyer
- Philippe Morier-Genoud as Superintendent Santelli
- Xavier Saint-Macary as Bertrand Fabre, Barbara's ex-husband
- Jean-Louis Richard as Louison, night club owner
- Caroline Sihol as Marie-Christine Vercel, Julien's wife
- Castel Casti as taxi driver
- Anik Belaubre as Paula Delbecq, cashier at The Eden
- Yann Dedet as Angel Face
- Nicole Félix as the scarred whore
- Georges Koulouris as Lablache, private investigator in Nice
- Pascale Pellegrin as would-be secretary
- Roland Thénot as Jambreau
- Pierre Gare as Inspector Poivert
- Jean-Pierre Kohut-Svelko as the Albanian

== Awards and nominations ==
Year	Award ceremony	Category	Nominee	Result
1984	BAFTA Awards	Best Foreign Film	Confidentially Yours	Nominated
1984	César Awards	Best Director	François Truffaut	Nominated
1984	César Awards	Best Actress	Fanny Ardant	Nominated
