= Père Jacques =

French Catholic priest and Carmelite friar

Servant of God Jacques de Jésus OCD
- Born: 29 January 1900; Barentin Seine-Maritime
- Died: 2 June 1945; Linz, Austria

Jacques de Jésus, OCD (born Lucien Bunel; 1900 – 2 June 1945), better known as Père Jacques, was a French Catholic priest and Discalced Carmelite friar. While serving as headmaster of a boarding school run by his order, he took in several Jewish refugees to protect them from the Nazi government of occupation, for which he was arrested and imprisoned in various concentration camps.

Père Jacques was one of those who undertook efforts to help Jews during the Nazi occupation of France. His efforts were ultimately unsuccessful, resulting in his death in Linz, Austria, just weeks after being liberated from the Mauthausen concentration camp in 1945.

Pere Jacques was named one of the Righteous Among the Nations by the State of Israel in 1985, as a non-Jew who risked his life during the Holocaust to save Jews. The cause for his beatification in the Catholic Church was opened in 1990. French film-maker Louis Malle paid tribute to Père Jacques, who was his primary school headmaster, in the 1987 film Au revoir les enfants.

== Biography ==
Born Lucien Bunel in Normandy in 1900, he was inspired by his father's example of deep piety and social service to study for the priesthood. He was ordained in 1925 to serve the Diocese of Rouen. After his ordination, he quickly became a noted preacher, as well as being a successful teacher. He also maintained a deep interior life of prayer.

Bunel had considered becoming a Trappist monk before his ordination, and still sought some way of integrating his being drawn to an intense life of prayer, combined with service to others. When he came to know the Discalced Carmelite nuns at Le Havre, he found a spiritual tradition which answered his quest. He entered the order in Lille in 1930 and took the religious name Jaques de Jésus. While he was preparing for his final profession of religious vows in 1934, his superiors suggested that he consider opening a school for boys. This was accomplished by him with the opening of the Petit Collège Sainte-Thérèse de l’Enfant-Jésus in Avon, Seine-et-Marne, that same year, of which he served as headmaster.

The friar served at the school until the outbreak of World War II, when he was conscripted for service in the French Army. When France surrendered to Germany the following June, he was released from military service. He returned to the school but became an active member of the French Resistance.

As headmaster, Father Jacques utilized the best tool available to him. He made the boys’ school a refuge for young men seeking to avoid conscription for forced labor in Germany and for Jews. In January 1943, he enrolled three Jewish boys – Hans-Helmut Michel, Jacques-France Halpern and Maurice Schlosser – as students, under false names. He also hid a fourth Jewish boy, Maurice Bas, as a worker at the school; sheltered Schlosser’s father with a local villager; and placed a noted Jewish botanist, Lucien Weil, on the faculty of the school.

The Gestapo discovered Father Jacques’ activities and seized the friar and the three Jewish students on January 15, 1944. Weil, his mother, and sister were arrested at their home that same day. On February 3, 1944, German authorities deported the boys and the Weil family to Auschwitz, where they died. Maurice Bas escaped arrest by hiding in the neighboring girls' school and survived the war.

Père Jacques was imprisoned in several Nazi concentration camps, eventually arriving at the Mauthausen-Gusen concentration camp. There he found ways of raising the morale of his despairing compatriots. When all the priests at Gusen were moved to the Dachau concentration camp – reputedly less severe than Mauthausen – Jacques veiled his priestly identity and was the only priest for 20,000 prisoners at Gusen. He learned enough Polish to minister to the Polish prisoners, who called him "Père Zak". Though he grew progressively weaker, he remained one of the Resistance leaders still active in the camp, gaining the respect of all its inmates.

He and the other inmates of the camps were liberated by American troops at Mauthausen in early May 1945. Suffering from tuberculosis and weighing only 75 pounds (34 kg), he died in a hospital in Linz in Upper Austria, several weeks later.

== Cause for Beatification ==
The cause of beatification was introduced by the Diocese of Meaux on 29 April, 1997. The diocesan phase closed in 2006.

== Yad Vashem ==
In 1985 the Israeli Holocaust remembrance center, Yad Vashem, honoured Père Jacques as one of the Righteous Among the Nations for his efforts in hiding Jewish students at his Catholic boarding school.

== Au revoir les enfants ==
The film Au revoir les enfants was a film made and directed by Louis Malle in 1987, a student who at the age of 11 attended Père Jacques' school and witnessed his arrest. The film is a fictionalised account of events at Père Jacques' school. In the film he is portrayed by French actor Philippe Morier-Genoud.

== See also ==
- Rescue of Jews by Catholics during the Holocaust

== Notes ==
This article incorporates text from the United States Holocaust Memorial Museum, which has been released under the GFDL.
