= Séverine Caneele =

Belgian actress

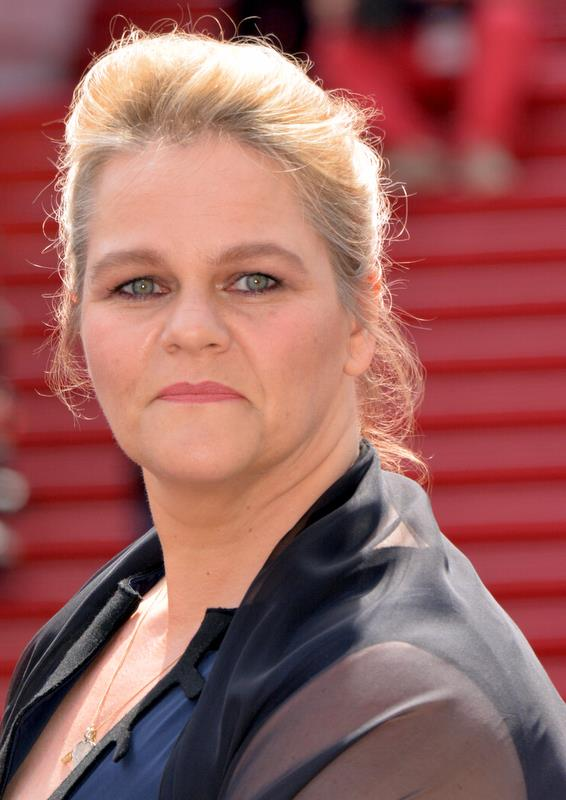
- Caneele at the 2017 Cannes Film Festival
- Born: 10 May 1974 (age 52); Nieuwkerke, West Flanders, Belgium
- Occupation: Actress
- Years active: 1999–present

Séverine Caneele (born 10 May 1974) is a Belgian film actress. She won the award for Best Actress at the 1999 Cannes Film Festival for the film L'humanité.

== Filmography ==
- L'humanité (1999)
- Une part du ciel (2002)
- Quand la mer monte... (2004)
- Holy Lola (2004)
- Rodin (2017)
