= Pattiyude Divasam =

2001 film

- Film festival poster
- Directed by: Murali Nair
- Written by: Murali Nair; Bharathan Njavakkal
- Produced by: Murali Nair; Preeya Nair
- Starring: K. Krishna Kaimal
- Cinematography: M J Radhakrishnan
- Edited by: Lalitha Krishna
- Release date: May 2001
- Running time: 74 minutes
- Country: India
- Language: Malayalam

Pattiyude Divasam (alternate title - A Dog's Day) is a 2001 Indian political satire film directed by Murali Nair.

== Cast ==
- K. Krishna Kaimal as The Lord
- Thomas as Koran
- Lakshmi Raman as Koran's Wife
- Suhas Thayat as Democratic Leader
- Vinu Prasad

== Release ==
It was screened in the Un Certain Regard section at the 2001 Cannes Film Festival. It was also screened at the 2001 Toronto International Film Festival and the 2001 Chicago International Film Festival.

== Critical reception ==
The film met with critical praise. Unni R. Nair of the Screen magazine commented, "The film, shot in a totally rural background in Kuttanad, represents on a microscopic scale the state of affairs all over the world in the present day. Political developments, coup attempts, meaningless peace-talks and accords, third-party mediation - everything is taken up for discussion, of course, on a miniature level. And the film becomes a really thought-provoking, brilliant social and political satire. A highlight of the film is that it has got very good quality spot recording that renders it an air of naturality."
