= Émilie Deleuze =

French film director

- Born: 7 May 1964 (age 62); France
- Occupations: Film director Screenwriter
- Years active: 1986–present

Émilie Deleuze (born 7 May 1964) is a French film director and screenwriter. She has directed eight films since 1986. Her film Peau neuve was screened in the Un Certain Regard section at the 1999 Cannes Film Festival. She is the daughter of the French philosopher Gilles Deleuze.

== Political views ==
In December 2023, alongside 50 other filmmakers, Deleuze signed an open letter published in Libération demanding a ceasefire and an end to the killing of civilians amid the 2023 Israeli invasion of the Gaza Strip, and for a humanitarian corridor into Gaza to be established for humanitarian aid, and the release of hostages.

== Filmography ==
- Monsieur Pierre (1986)
- Coup de sang (1990)
- Va mourir (1991)
- Peau neuve (1999)
- Lettre à Abou (2001)
- Pas d'histoires! (2001)
- Mister V. (2003)
- À deux c'est plus facile (2009)
- Tout est permis (TV) (2014)
- Jamais contente (2016)
