= Marana Simhasanam =

1999 film

- Film poster at the Cannes festival
- Directed by: Murali Nair
- Written by: Bharathan Njavakkal (dialogue)
- Screenplay by: Murali Nair
- Story by: Murali Nair
- Produced by: Murali Nair
- Starring: Vishwas Njavakkal; Lakshmi Raman; Sudhas Thayat; Jeevan Mitwa
- Cinematography: M. J. Radhakrishnan
- Edited by: Lalitha Krishna
- Music by: Madhu Apsara
- Release date: 15 December 1999
- Running time: 57 minutes
- Country: India
- Language: Malayalam

Marana Simhasanam (English: Throne of Death, French: Le Trone de la mort) is a 1999 Indian Malayalam-language satire drama film written and directed by Murali Nair. Inspired by the first execution by electrocution in India, the film was screened in the Un Certain Regard section at the 1999 Cannes Film Festival where it won the Caméra d'Or. The film received special reception at the British Film Institute. The film received positive reviews from Le Monde for its unusual theme. The film was screened in Vienna, Turin, Toronto, Busan, La Rochelle, Midnight Sun Film Festival Lapland, and the American Film Institute's Film Festival.

== Plot ==
Krishnan is an out-of-work seasonal farmer who is driven to steal coconuts from his landlord to support his family. When he is caught and imprisoned, he is shocked to learn that he has been charged with the murder of a man who has been missing from the island for many years. But since it was an election time, and the most popular platform for politicians had become capital punishment, Krishnan is sentenced to death in the country's newest technology - electrocution by electric chair funded by the World bank. He is promised a statue being erected in his honour.

== Cast ==
- Vishwas Njavakkal
- Lakshmi Raman
- Suhas Thayat
- Jeevan Mitva

== Production ==
The film was shot entirely by amateur team on location near the Manjanikkadu islet in Vypin, a small island off the coast of Njarakkal in Kerala, India. Except the female lead, all characters were portrayed by the locals in the village, including a widowed basket weaver who responded to a casting advertisement in the Malayalam daily Mathrubhoomi.

== Accolades ==
Ceremony	Award	Result	Ref.
1999 Cannes Film Festival	Caméra d'Or	Won	
2000 Festival international du Film Cinema Jove de Valence	Special Mention - Feature Film	Won	
1999 Torino Film Festival	Best Feature Film	Won	
Kodak Theatre	Kodak Prize	Won	
1999 Busan International Film Festival	New Currents Award	Nominated	
1999 International Film Festival of Kerala	The Golden Crow Pheasant Award	Nominated	
