= Holy Lola =

- Theatrical release poster
- Directed by: Bertrand Tavernier
- Written by: Dominique Sampiero, Bertrand Tavernier, Tiffany Tavernier
- Produced by: Frédéric Bourboulon
- Starring: Jacques Gamblin; Isabelle Carré
- Cinematography: Alain Choquart
- Edited by: Sophie Brunet
- Music by: Henri Texier
- Distributed by: TFM Distribution
- Release date: 24 November 2004
- Running time: 128 minutes
- Country: France
- Language: French
- Budget: $5.8 million
- Box office: $2.9 million

Holy Lola is a 2004 French drama film that is directed by Bertrand Tavernier. Tavernier said that the film was very, very moving, very exciting to do, and it made him fall in love with Cambodia.

== Plot ==
A French couple, Pierre and Geraldine want kids, but Geraldine is unable to conceive. After eleven years of infertility and a two-year vetting and administrative process they travel to Cambodia to adopt an orphan. They want to adopt before Christmas. When the couple reaches Cambodia, they book a hotel that has other French people that are also waiting to adopt. Their tempers flare when they have to deal with corruption, frequent rain, mosquitoes, many documents, and the uncertainty of whether or not they will be successful and if they are, what they will do if the baby has any serious diseases.

== Cast ==
- Jacques Gamblin : Dr. Pierre Ceyssac
- Isabelle Carré : Géraldine Ceyssac
- Bruno Putzulu : Marco Folio
- Frédéric Pierrot : Xavier
- Séverine Caneele : Patricia
- Rithy Panh : Monsieur Khieu

== Production ==
At first, Tavernier wanted to direct a different film. He wanted to make a film that was based on his daughter Tiffany's novel Dans la nuit aussi le ciel. Tiffany didn't want him to direct it because she thought that it would be too difficult. Tiffany later ended up proposing Holy Lola to her father and wrote the screenplay.

== Release ==
The film played at the City of Lights, City of Angels film festival. The DVD was released in 2006. The languages are German and French in Dolby Digital 5.1. The DVD has an anamorphic picture. The special features on the DVD are the making of the film, an interview with the director, and the trailer.

== Reception ==
Lisa Nesselson of Variety said that the semi-docu style incorporates plentiful local color, and film's jazzy score is a soothing counterpart to the frayed emotions depicted. Sheri Linden, of The Hollywood Reporter, said that Alain Choquart's ace camerawork captures the intimate drama with immediacy, and Henri Texier's propulsive music is a major contribution.
