= Arimpara =

2003 film

- Film poster
- Directed by: Murali Nair
- Written by: Murali Nair; Madhu Apsara; O. V. Vijayan (story)
- Produced by: P. Parameswaran; Makoto Ueda
- Starring: Nedumudi Venu; Sona Nair
- Cinematography: M. J. Radhakrishnan
- Edited by: Lalitha Krishna
- Release date: 18 May 2003
- Running time: 90 minutes
- Country: India
- Language: Malayalam

Arimpara (transl. "The Wart"; alternate title A Story That Begins at the End) is a 2003 Indian body horror film directed by Murali Nair. It was screened in competition at the 1st World Film Festival of Bangkok and in the Un Certain Regard section at the 2003 Cannes Film Festival. It won the John Abraham Award for Best Malayalam Film in 2003.

== Plot ==
Based on O.V. Vijayan's story of the same name, the movie is about Krishnan Unni and his wart. Krishnan is a landlord living happily with his wife and son. He comes from a family that is well-respected in the village. However, things have changed now; labourers are no more the bonded slaves who used to bend over for their landlords. Krishnan still lives in the past glory days and refuses to change with time. The story takes a "Kafkaish" turn when a wart on his face takes a life of its own. What happens to Krishnan forms the rest of the story.

The wart is a metaphor for the burden of old customs and traditions. Krishnan, well rooted in the old traditional ways, refuses to change with the times. He refuses to get surgery on the wart but tries to cure it with the ancient practise of herbal medicine. The lesson here is if one doesn't change with time, the old customs and blind faith will become a burden and, if one persists, a time will come when they will take over, meaning all of a person's decisions will be based on how they traditionally did it or what the old scriptures or astrological charts dictate. After a while, these old traditions and customs would be taken out as something personal to an individual or a group, associated with the god, and made into something holy. Now everybody has to do it as it is divine. Murali in the end shows how the wart which was growing in him escapes from Krishnan Unni and becomes a huge elephant. A bunch of priests are looking at the elephant and they comment that such a big animal should be kept in the temple. The wart which was personal to one person has become divine and holy to everyone now. All he had to do to cure the wart was to seek the help of science.

== Cast ==
- Nedumudi Venu as Krishnan Unni
- Sona Nair
- Bharathan Njavakkal
- Rajan Sithara
- Master Bhagyanath
- Nakuul Mehta
