= Doctor Innocentanu =

Doctor Innocent Aanu
- Film poster
- Directed by: Ajmal
- Screenplay by: Ajmal
- Produced by: Saseendra Varma
- Starring: Innocent; Sona Nair
- Cinematography: Anandakuttan
- Edited by: G. Murali
- Music by: Santhosh Varma
- Production company: Varma Film Corporation
- Distributed by: Red Roses Release
- Release date: 27 April 2012
- Country: India
- Language: Malayalam

Doctor Innocentanu is a 2012 Indian Malayalam-language comedy film written and directed by Ajmal, starring Innocent and Sona Nair in the lead roles. The film is inspired from Guy de Maupassant's English short story The Necklace.

== Plot ==
Doctor Innocentanu is the story of Homeopathic Doctor Bargavan Pillai who always helps poor patients. His wife, Subha Lakshmi, is unhappy that her husband is not earning a lot to lead a financially healthy life. For the Panchayat elections, one political party approaches Bargavan Pillai to contest on behalf of them. Though he is reluctant, he relents when his wife persuades him. However, Doctor does not win the elections, despite a strong campaign.

Bargavan Pillai's longtime friend, Dr. James, invites them to his daughter's wedding. Subha Lakshmi complains that the family does not have good dresses to wear for the wedding. Bargavan Pillai goes to a pawnbroker and takes the money instead of his beloved scooter. His family becomes excited when they get new clothes but now Subha Lakshmi complains that they do not have enough ornaments. On her advice, Doctor goes to his neighbor, Vasudevan, and borrows his wife's costly necklace for a day. But Subha Lakshmi loses the ornament during the wedding function. Doctor buys a new ornament from a jewelry shop by promising that he will pay the money in a few days and gives it to Vasudevan.

Dr. James comes to Bargavan Pillai's home to say that he got the ornament back from the garden. Bargavan Pillai goes to the jewelry shop to give the ornament back and clear the debt. But they find that the ornament is only gold-plated. Bargavan Pillai comes to Vasudevan's house only to see that Vasudevan has been arrested by police for similar fraud. Bargavan Pillai also discovers that the politicians who stood with him during the elections had taken a loan from a bank using Bargavan Pillai's signature.

Since Bargavan Pillai hadn't repaid the loan for a long time, the bank decides to seize his house. However, during the court proceedings of sealing his house, Anna comes to the scene. She was brought up at the orphanage where Bargavan Pillai provided free service for years. Anna says she is alive only because of the medicines Bargavan Pillai sends her. Anna promises to clear off his debts and all ends well.

== Cast ==
- Innocent as Dr. Bhargavan Pillai
- Sona Nair as Subha Lakshmi
- Jagathy Sreekumar as Dravyan
- Suraj Venjaramoodu as Vasudevan (Gold Vasu)
- Nithya Menen as Anna (special appearance)
- Lena as Adabia
- Devan as Dr. James
- Ponnamma Babu as Komalavalli
- Kottayam Nazeer as Pootturukki Pushpan
- Harisree Ashokan as Pookkoya
- Jaffar Idukki
- Haneef kumaranellur
- Narayanankutty
- Bijukuttan as Rajappan
- Sasi Kalinga as Shekharan
- Shari
- Sukumari as Noorjahan
- Meena Ganesh
- Kulappulli Leela as Tresiyamma
- Deepika Mohan as Mother Superior
