= Daddy Nostalgie =

1990 film

- Film poster
- Directed by: Bertrand Tavernier
- Written by: Colo Tavernier O'Hagan; Bertrand Tavernier
- Produced by: Adolphe Viezzi
- Starring: Dirk Bogarde; Jane Birkin; Odette Laure; Emmanuelle Bataille; Charlotte Kady
- Cinematography: Denis Lenoir
- Edited by: Ariane Boeglin
- Music by: Antoine Duhamel
- Distributed by: UGC PH
- Release date: 5 September 1990
- Running time: 105 minutes
- Country: France
- Languages: French; English
- Box office: $1.1 million

Daddy Nostalgie, released as These Foolish Things in the UK and Daddy Nostalgia in the US, is a 1990 French drama film directed by Bertrand Tavernier. It was entered into the 1990 Cannes Film Festival and is Dirk Bogarde's last film. Odette Laure was nominated for the César Award for Best Supporting Actress.

The film tells the story of a young woman who goes to help her parents during her father's last illness and how in that time father and daughter establish a tentative bond that had eluded them all their lives. The film is dedicated to Michael Powell, who died shortly before its release.

== Plot ==
Caroline, a freelance scriptwriter in Paris, is called to the hospital where her father Tony, a retired businessman, has undergone surgery. She stays with her mother Miche in their home on the south coast and helps her when he comes back to convalesce. In moments of conversation or reverie, the three examine their relationships with each other.

Miche is a woman of limited and conventional mind, whose only outside interests are bridge and her Catholic church. Her assets were beauty, now gone, and fidelity. Tony has no outside interests, being a shallow and selfish man, but his asset is charm, which has seen him through his life and now serves to conceal both his constant physical pain and his fear of imminent death.

Caroline wants to love them but throughout her life has mostly been neglected by them, particularly since she split up with the father of her child. In Tony's last weeks, Caroline begins to learn a lot about the father she hardly ever saw and to form a bond with him, strengthened by secret outings to bars for the alcohol he is forbidden.

She has to go back to Paris to retrieve her young son and while there learns of Tony's death. The trains are on strike and every flight is full, so she walks the streets of the city alone with her grief.

== Cast ==
- Dirk Bogarde as Daddy
- Jane Birkin as Caroline
- Odette Laure as Miche
- Charlotte Kady as Barbara, the nurse
- Bertrand Tavernier as Narrator (uncredited)
