= Murali Nair =

Indian film director

- Born: 10 January 1966 (age 60); Anandapuram, Kerala, India
- Occupations: Film director Screenwriter
- Years active: 1993–present
- Website: www.muralinair.co

Murali Nair (born 10 January 1966) is an Indian film director and screenwriter. He has directed eight films since 1993. His film Marana Simhasanam was screened in the Un Certain Regard section at the 1999 Cannes Film Festival where it won the Caméra d'Or.

== Filmography ==
- Tragedy of an Indian Farmer (1993) - The film won the National Film Award – Special Jury Award (non-feature film) in 1993 Stella Raja, both a dubbing artist and actor, is the main actor in the short film.
- Coronations (1995)
- Oru Neenda Yathra (1996)
- Marana Simhasanam (1999)
- Pattiyude Divasam (2001)
- Arimpara (2003)
- Relax (2003)
- Unni (2006)
- Stories On Human Rights (2008)
- Laadli Laila (virgin goat) (2010)
- Summer Holidays (2013)
