= Colo Tavernier O'Hagan =

British-French screenwriter (1942–2020)

- Born: Claudine Elizabeth O'Hagan; 30 July 1942; Guildford, Surrey, England
- Died: 13 June 2020 (aged 77); Paris, France
- Occupation: Screenwriter
- Spouse: Bertrand Tavernier (m. 1965; div. 1981)
- Children: 2; including Nils Tavernier

Colo Tavernier O'Hagan (30 July 1942 – 12 June 2020) was a British-French screenwriter.

== Early life ==
Claudine Elizabeth O'Hagan was born in Guildford, Surrey, to an Irish father and a French-Spanish mother.

== Career ==
Tavernier O'Hagan is best known for collaborations with her former husband, director Bertrand Tavernier, writing screenplays for his movies A Week's Vacation (1980), A Sunday in the Country (1984), which earned her the César Award for Best Adaptation, Beatrice (1987), Daddy Nostalgie (1990) and The Bait (1995). With Claude Chabrol, she also co-wrote the screenplay for Story of Women (1988).

In 2013, she published a book, Les Maux Des Mots.

== Personal life ==
Tavernier O'Hagan was married to director Bertrand Tavernier from 1965 to 1981. They had two children, Nils and Tiffany.

== Death ==
Colo Tavernier O'Hagan died of cancer on 12 June 2020, at the age of 77.

== Filmography ==
=== Film ===
Year	Title	Director	Notes
1980	A Week's Vacation	Bertrand Tavernier	
1984	A Sunday in the Country	Bertrand Tavernier	César Award for Best Adaptation; Nominated — National Society of Film Critics Award for Best Screenplay
1986	Round Midnight	Bertrand Tavernier	French translation
1987	Beatrice	Bertrand Tavernier	Nominated — César Award for Best Original Screenplay or Adaptation
1988	Story of Women	Claude Chabrol	Bogota Film Festival Award for Best Screenplay (shared with Claude Chabrol)
1987	Summer Interlude	Daniel Vigne	
1990	Daddy Nostalgie	Bertrand Tavernier	
1995	Le petit garçon	Pierre Granier-Deferre	
1995	The Bait	Bertrand Tavernier	
2008	Geliebte Clara	Helma Sanders-Brahms	
2017	Paris la blanche	Lidia Terki	

=== Television ===
Year	Title	Notes
1988	Sueurs froides	Episode: "Coup de pouce"
1989	Haute tension	Episode: "Le Bois de justice"
1993	Un pull par-dessus l'autre	
1995	Les mercredis de la vie	Episode: "Charlotte dite 'Charlie'"
1997	Un arbre dans la tête	
1999	Chasseurs d'écume	Miniseries, 2 episodes
2003	Le gang des poupées	
2003	Papa maman s'ront jamais grands	
2005	Une vie	
2007	Les jurés	
2008	La maison Tellier	
2011	Joseph l'insoumis	
