= Philippe Morier-Genoud =

French theatre and film actor (born 1944)

- Born: 2 March 1944 (age 81)
- Occupation: Actor

Philippe Morier-Genoud (born 2 March 1944) is a French theatre and film actor.

== Selected filmography ==
- Confidentially Yours (1983)
- Au revoir les enfants (1987)
- Cyrano de Bergerac (1990)
- Safe Conduct (2002)
- A Private Affair (2002)
- Streamfield, les carnets noirs (2010)

== Decorations ==
- Chevalier of the Legion of Honour (2015)
