= Raphaël Fejtö =

French actor, director, and author

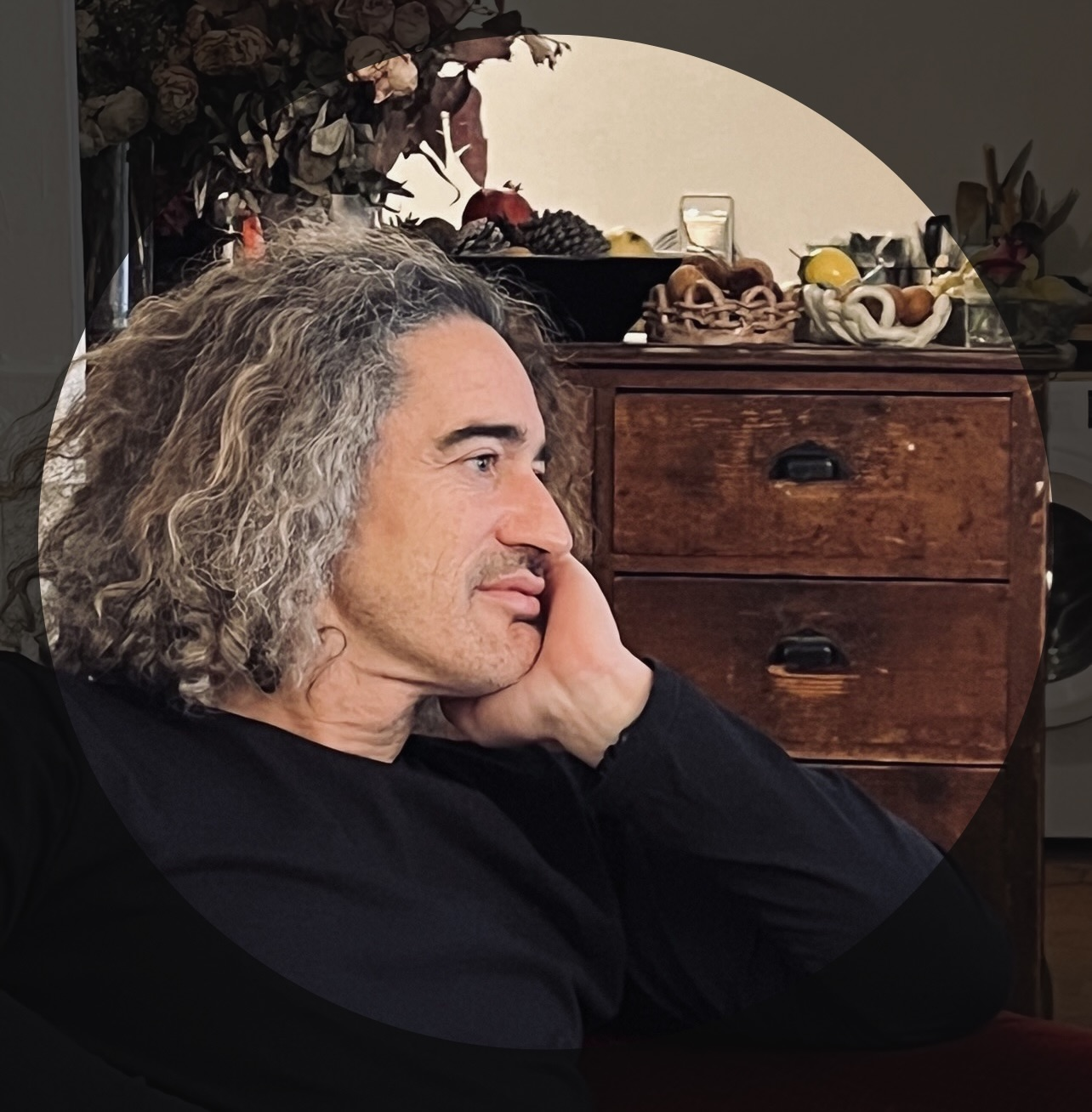
- Fejtö in 2023
- Born: 17 September 1974 (age 51)
- Occupation: Actor
- Years active: 1987–present

Raphaël Fejtő (born 17 September 1974) is a French actor, director, and author. He is most famous for co-starring in Louis Malle's semi-autobiographical 1987 motion picture Au revoir les enfants (Goodbye, Children).

Fejtő is of Russian, Egyptian, Jewish and Lebanese ancestry. His grandfather was Ferenc Fejtő, a famous Hungarian historian and journalist.

== Films ==
His primary acting credit is in Au revoir, les enfants. He also wrote, directed, and starred in the 1996 short film 56 fois par semaine (56 Times A Week). He wrote and directed the French-language film Osmose (Osmosis) in 2003. His second motion picture, L'Age D'Homme (The Age of Man, which he also wrote), starred Romain Duris, Aïssa Maïga, and Clément Sibony and was released in 2007.

== Children's books ==
He is also the co-author and illustrator (with his mother, Nadja) of several children's books. Among these are Le Vélo de Jo (Jo's Bicycle), Petit George (Little George), and Roro le Pompier (Roro the Fireman).
