= Humanité =

L'humanité
- Directed by: Bruno Dumont
- Written by: Bruno Dumont
- Produced by: Rachid Bouchareb; Jean Bréhat
- Starring: Emmanuel Schotté; Séverine Caneele; Philippe Tullier
- Cinematography: Yves Cape
- Edited by: Guy Lecorne
- Music by: Richard Cuvillier
- Distributed by: Tadrart Films
- Release date: 17 May 1999
- Running time: 148 minutes
- Country: France
- Languages: French; English

Humanité (French: L'humanité) is a 1999 film directed by Bruno Dumont. It tells the story of a withdrawn police lieutenant investigating a rape and murder of a schoolgirl in rural France, his slow enquiries interspersed with everyday scenes of his quiet life. The film is shot with little dialogue in a contemplative and symbolical style. The policeman is named after a distinguished French painter, Pharaon de Winter, who was from the town where the film is set.

== Plot ==
In the far north of France, filmed in Bailleul, a girl of 11 has been raped and murdered as she walked to her parents' remote farm from the school bus. Called onto the case, Lieutenant Pharaon de Winter feels extreme revulsion. After having lost his partner and child in an accident, he now lives quietly with his widowed mother.

At the weekend his neighbour Domino, who is sympathetic to his deeply affected state, asks him to join her and her lover Joseph, a bus driver. They go to the seaside and to a restaurant, but the reserved Pharaon finds Joseph ignorant and coarse.

The police investigation moves slowly, with Pharaon looking into possibilities such as whether the murderer was a bus driver or a psychiatric patient. Noting that the murder site could be seen from Eurostar trains, he goes to London to interview passengers. But with no firm lead, the case is taken over by the Lille police.

The factory where Domino works goes on strike and the police, led by Pharaon, have to quell a demonstration. Though outwardly angry, in fact Domino admires his quiet determination and offers herself to him. However, he rejects her explicit advances, saying “not like that”, and his mother warns her off.

Then the Lille police arrest Joseph. When Pharaon gets to the police station, he finds him beaten up and weeping. At first baffled, Pharaon is soon surprised to find Joseph confessing in tears. Being a man of deep feeling, Pharaon comforts him, caressing him with his nose and kissing him on the mouth. When he goes home, his mother is out and Domino is at the kitchen table weeping. He comforts her. The final shot shows Pharaon sitting in a chair in his office at the police station, staring out the window, with handcuffs visibly shackling his wrists.

== Cast ==
- Emmanuel Schotté as Pharaon de Winter
- Séverine Caneele as Domino
- Philippe Tullier as Joseph
- Ghislain Ghesquère as Police Chief
- Ginette Allegre as Eliane de Winter
- Daniel Leroux as Nurse
- Arnaud Brejon de la Lavergnee as Museum Curator
- Daniel Petillon as Jean, the cop
- Robert Bunzi as English cop
- Dominique Pruvost as Angry worker
- Jean-Luc Dumont as Armed cop
- Diane Gray as British traveller
- Paul Gray as British traveller
- Sophie Vercamer as Worker
- Murielle Houche as Worker

== Production ==
Séverine Caneele was replaced by a body double in the scene in which Domino's vulva is seen in close-up.

== Reception ==
On review aggregator Rotten Tomatoes, the film has an approval rating of 69% based on 26 reviews, with an average score of 6.5/10. Metacritic has a score of 77 out of 100, indicating "generally favorable reviews". David Sterritt wrote for the Christian Science Monitor "Dumont's cinematic style is aggressively physical and philosophical at the same time. It irritates as many viewers as it inspires, but it prompts more thought than ordinary movies ever do".

== Awards ==
The film was entered into the 1999 Cannes Film Festival where it won the following awards:

- Grand Prix
- Best Actor (Emmanuel Schotté)
- Best Actress (Séverine Caneele)
