= Gaspard Manesse =

French actor, composer and musician (born 1975)

Gaspard Manesse (born 25 March 1975 in Paris) is a French actor, composer and musician. He is best known for his starring role as Julien Quentin in the film Au revoir les enfants (1987). He acted in and composed the music for the film Comme il vient. Gaspard is a composer and musician - he tours throughout the heart of France playing the trumpet with a group called "Surnatural Orchestra" from the Ile-de-France.

== Filmography ==
- Comme il vient – 2002
- Erreur de jeunesse (fr) – 1989
- Au revoir les enfants (Goodbye, Children) – 1987
