= Beatrice (1987 film) =

1987 film by Bertrand Tavernier

- Directed by: Bertrand Tavernier
- Written by: Colo Tavernier O'Hagan
- Produced by: Adolphe Viezzi
- Starring: Bernard-Pierre Donnadieu; Julie Delpy; Monique Chaumette; Robert Dhéry; Michèle Gleizer; Nils Tavernier; Maxime Leroux; Jean-Claude Adelin
- Cinematography: Bruno de Keyzer
- Edited by: Armand Psenny
- Music by: Ron Carter
- Production companies: Cléa Productions - AMLF - TF1 Films Production - Les Films de la Tour - Little Bear (Paris); Scena Film (Rome)
- Distributed by: AMLF (France)
- Release date: 11 November 1987 (France)
- Running time: 124 minutes
- Countries: France; Italy
- Language: French
- Box office: $4 million

Beatrice (French:La passion Béatrice, Italian:Quarto comandamento) is a 1987 French-Italian historical drama film directed by Bertrand Tavernier and starring Bernard-Pierre Donnadieu, Julie Delpy and Nils Tavernier. Set in a castle in France during the Hundred Years' War and Avignon Papacy (sometime between 1337 and 1377), it recounts the sufferings of Béatrice at the hands of her brutal father.

== Plot ==
When a knight goes off to fight the English, he leaves his young son François at his castle to guard his wife. Catching her in bed with a man, François stabs the lover to death and retreats to the tower, where he waits for his father's return. Years later, he goes off with his son Arnaud to fight and leaves his young daughter Béatrice to guard the castle. When her menfolk are captured by the English, she sells goods and lands to raise ransoms. Years later, disillusioned by war and captivity, the two return to a depleted heritage. While Arnaud has remained soft, François has become bitter and hard.

He terrorises the neighbourhood, raping and looting, and tyrannises his household. His wild lust leads him to take Béatrice's virginity by force, saying that she is now his wife. The village priest refuses to marry the pair, so François has the idea of marrying her to a wealthy commoner who bought much of their land. The man demurs, however, preferring to find a virgin he does not have to share with her father. Though Béatrice has to submit her body to her father, nothing will change her mind: she casts spells, and pays a witch to wish death on her ravisher.

When she realises that she is pregnant, she tells her brother and asks him to kick her in the abdomen. François sees this effort to destroy his child and takes his revenge. Dressing Arnaud as a girl, he gives him a sporting start and then rides after him with all his henchmen in a wild manhunt, forcing Béatrice to ride with them. On returning to the castle, Béatrice finds that, in addition to losing her brother, her pet birds have been killed. She goes up to her father's room and stabs him to death.

== Cast ==
- Bernard-Pierre Donnadieu as François de Cortemart
- Julie Delpy as Béatrice de Cortemart
- Nils Tavernier as Arnaud de Cortemart
- Monique Chaumette as La mère de François
- Michèle Gleizer as Hélène
- Maxime Leroux as Richard
- Jean-Claude Adelin as Bertrand Lemartin
- Robert Dhéry as Raoul
- Jean-Louis Grinfeld as Maître Blanche
- Claude Duneton as The priest
- Isabelle Nanty as The baby-sitter
- Jean-Luc Rivals as Jehan
- Roselyne Vuillaume as Marie
- Maïté Maillé as La Noiraude
- Albane Guilhe as La Recluse
- Marie Privat as Marguerite
- Sébastien Konieczny as François Enfant
- Vincent Saint-Ouen as Le père de François enfant
- Tina Sportolaro as La mère de François enfant
- François Hadji-Lazaro as Curé départ guerre
- Nicole Siffre as Pauline
- Myriam Thomas as Mariette
- Christophe Rea as Jacques
- David Ordonez as Thomas
- Jacques Raynaud as Joseph
- Pétrus Léo Crombe as Gildas
- Béatrice Abatut as Blandine
- Marie Cosnay as Nicolette
- Sylvie Beyssen, Anne Bolon, Frédérique Figuero, Agnès Hick as Prostituées

== Production ==
Bertrand Tavernier said that Julie Delpy had an exceptional power of concentration and emotion. She had to shoot a quite difficult scene completely naked. He told her there would be no rehearsal. The first take went very well, but she asked for a second. She said to him: "I can do better."

== Filming ==
Filming began on Monday, 30 March 1987, in Comus, in the Aude department. The production was made difficult by snow and bad weather. Filming continued until mid-May at the Château de Puivert.

== Bibliography ==
- Greene, Naomi. Landscapes of Loss: The National Past in Postwar French Cinema. Princeton University Press, 1999.
- Waters, Sandra. Narrating the Italian Historical Novel. ProQuest, 2009.
