= Au revoir les enfants =

1987 autobiographical film directed by Louis Malle

- Film poster
- Directed by: Louis Malle
- Written by: Louis Malle
- Produced by: Louis Malle
- Starring: Gaspard Manesse; Raphaël Fejtő; Philippe Morier-Genoud; Francine Racette
- Cinematography: Renato Berta
- Edited by: Emmanuelle Castro
- Music by: Schubert; Saint-Saëns
- Distributed by: MK2 Diffusion (France)
- Release dates: 29 August 1987 (Venice); 7 October 1987 (France)
- Running time: 104 minutes
- Countries: France; West Germany; Italy
- Languages: French; German
- Box office: $4.5 million

Au revoir les enfants (French pronunciation: [o ʁə.vwaʁ le zɑ̃.fɑ̃], meaning "Goodbye, Children") is an autobiographical 1987 film written, produced, and directed by Louis Malle. It is based on the actions of Père Jacques, a French priest and headmaster who attempted to shelter Jewish children during the Holocaust. The film won the Golden Lion at the Venice Film Festival.

== Plot ==
During the winter of 1943–44, Julien Quentin, a student at a Carmelite boarding school in occupied France, is returning to school from vacation. He acts tough to the other students, but is actually a pampered boy who misses his mother deeply. Saddened to be returning to the monotony of boarding school, Julien's classes seem uneventful until Père Jean, the headmaster, introduces three new pupils. One of them, Jean Bonnet, is the same age as Julien. Like the other students, Julien at first despises Bonnet, a socially awkward boy with a talent for arithmetic and playing the piano.

One night, Julien wakes up and finds Bonnet wearing a kippah and praying in Hebrew. After digging through his new friend's locker, Julien learns the truth. His real name is not Bonnet, but Kippelstein. Père Jean, a compassionate, sacrificing priest at the school, had agreed to grant secret asylum to refugee Jews. After a game of treasure hunt, Julien and Jean bond and develop a close friendship.

When Julien's mother visits on Parents' Day, Julien asks his mother if Bonnet, whose parents could not come, could accompany them to lunch at a gourmet restaurant. As they sit around the table, the talk turns to Julien's father, a factory owner. When Julien's brother asks if he is still for Marshal Pétain, Madame Quentin responds, "No one is anymore." The Milice arrive and attempt to expel a Jewish diner. When Julien's brother calls them "Collabos", the Milice commander is enraged and tells Madam Quentin, "We serve France, madam. He insulted us." When a Wehrmacht officer coldly orders them to leave, the Milice officers grudgingly obey. Julien's mother comments that the Jewish diner appears to be a very distinguished gentleman. She insists that she has nothing against Jews, but would not object if the socialist politician Léon Blum were hanged.

Shortly thereafter, Joseph, the school's assistant cook, is exposed for selling the school's food supplies on the black market. He implicates several students as accomplices, including Julien and his brother, François. Although Père Jean is visibly distressed by the injustice, he fires Joseph but does not expel the students for fear of offending their wealthy, influential parents.

On a cold morning in January 1944, the Gestapo raid the school, searching for Jean Kippelstein. As his classroom is being searched, Julien unintentionally gives away Bonnet by looking in his direction. As the other two Jewish boys are hunted, Julien encounters the person who denounced them, Joseph the kitchen hand. Trying to justify his betrayal in the face of Julien's mute disbelief, Joseph tells him, "Don't act so pious. There's a war going on, kid." Disgusted, Julien runs off. Jean and Julien exchange books, a shared habit of theirs, as they pack away their belongings due to the closure of the school.

As the students are lined up in the school courtyard, a Gestapo officer denounces Père Jean's actions and calls French people weak and undisciplined. A moment later, Père Jean, followed by the three Jewish boys in single file is led away across the school yard. One by one, as the priest passes through their midst, the students spontaneously call out to him, "Au revoir, mon père!" He pauses and half turns towards them and gives a loud reply: "Au revoir, les enfants! À bientôt!" Jean is the last to exit the school grounds through a metal door in the garden wall. As he steps through the doorway, he glances back for a moment toward Julien, and Julien gives him a timid wave in return.

The film ends with an older Julien providing a voice over epilogue, in which he mentions that Bonnet, Negus and Dupré died at Auschwitz, whereas Père Jean died at Mauthausen; the school reopened in October. He explains that although more than 40 years have passed, he will remember every second of that January morning until the day he dies.

== Cast ==
- Gaspard Manesse as Julien Quentin
- Raphaël Fejtő as Jean Kippelstein, alias "Jean Bonnet"
- Francine Racette as Mme Quentin (Julien's mother)
- Stanislas Carré de Malberg as François Quentin (Julien's older brother)
- Philippe Morier-Genoud as Father Jean/Père Jean
- François Berléand as Father Michel/Père Michel
- Irène Jacob as Mlle Davenne
- François Négret as Joseph (kitchen helper)
- Peter Fitz as Dr. Müller, Gestapo leader
- Pascal Rivet as Boulanger
- Benoît Henriet as Ciron
- Richard Leboeuf as Sagard
- Xavier Legrand as Babinot
- Arnaud Henriet as Negus
- Damien Salot as Dupré

== Actual events ==
The film is based on events in the childhood of the director, Louis Malle, who at age 11 was attending a Roman Catholic boarding school near Fontainebleau. One day, he witnessed a Gestapo raid in which three Jewish students and a Jewish teacher were arrested and deported to Auschwitz. The school's headmaster, Père Jacques, was arrested for harboring them and sent to the concentration camp at Mauthausen. He died shortly after the camp was liberated by the U.S. Army, having refused to leave until the last French prisoner was repatriated. Forty years later, Yad Vashem, Israel's official memorial to the victims of the Holocaust, granted Père Jacques the title of Righteous Among the Nations.

== Reception ==
=== Box office ===
The film was a box-office success, having 3.5 million admissions in France and grossing $4,542,825 in North America.

=== Critical response ===
The film was extremely well received by critics. Au Revoir, les Enfants has an approval rating of 97% on review aggregator website Rotten Tomatoes, based on 37 reviews, and an average rating of 9.1/10, with the consensus: "Louis Malle's autobiographical tale of a childhood spent in a WWII boarding school is a beautifully realized portrait of friendship and youth." Metacritic assigned the film a weighted average score of 88 out of 100, based on 18 critics, indicating "universal acclaim".

According to Quentin Tarantino, the title for his first feature-length film, Reservoir Dogs (1992), came about after a patron at a Video Archives rental store, where Tarantino worked, misheard his film suggestion of Au revoir les enfants as "reservoir dogs".

The screenplay was published by Gallimard in the same year.

=== Awards and nominations ===
Year	Association	Category	Nominee	Result	Ref.
1988	Academy Awards	Best Foreign Language Film	Au revoir les enfants	Nominated	
1988	Academy Awards	Best Screenplay Written Directly for the Screen	Louis Malle	Nominated	
1989	BAFTA Awards	Best Film	Louis Malle	Nominated	
1989	BAFTA Awards	Best Direction	Louis Malle	Won	
1989	BAFTA Awards	Best Original Screenplay	Louis Malle	Nominated	
1989	BAFTA Awards	Best Film Not in the English Language	Louis Malle	Nominated	
1988	César Awards	Best Film	Au revoir les enfants	Won	
1988	César Awards	Best Director	Louis Malle	Won	
1988	César Awards	Most Promising Actor	François Négret	Nominated	
1988	César Awards	Best Original Screenplay or Adaptation	Louis Malle	Won	
1988	César Awards	Best Cinematography	Renato Berta	Won	
1988	César Awards	Best Editing	Emnanuelle Castro	Won	
1988	César Awards	Best Sound	Jean-Claude Laureux, Claude Villand, Bernard Leroux	Won	
1988	César Awards	Best Costume Design	Corinne Jorry	Nominated	
1988	César Awards	Best Production Design	Willy Holt	Won	
1988	Golden Globe Awards	Best Foreign Language Film	Au revoir les enfants	Nominated	
1987	Louis Delluc Prize	Best Film	Louis Malle	Won	
1987	Los Angeles Film Critics Association	Best Foreign film	Louis Malle	Won	
1987	Venice Film Festival	Golden Lion	Louis Malle	Won	
1987	Venice Film Festival	OCIC Award	Louis Malle	Won	
1987	Venice Film Festival	UNICEF Award	Louis Malle	Won	
1987	Venice Film Festival	Sergio Trasatti Award	Louis Malle	Won	
1987	Venice Film Festival	Special Golden Ciak	Louis Malle	Won	
1987	National Board of Review	Top Five International Films	Au revoir les enfants	3rd place	
1988	David di Donatello Awards	Best Foreign Film	Louis Malle	Won	
1988	David di Donatello Awards	Best Foreign Director	Louis Malle	Won	
1988	David di Donatello Awards	Best Foreign Screenplay	Louis Malle	Won	
1988	European Film Awards	Best Film	Louis Malle	Nominated	
1988	European Film Awards	Best Director	Louis Malle	Nominated	
1988	European Film Awards	Best Screenwriter	Louis Malle	Won	
1988	Film Independent Spirit Awards	Best International Film	Louis Malle	Nominated	
1988	French Syndicate of Cinema Critics	Best French Film	Louis Malle	Won	
1988	Italian National Syndicate of Film Journalists	Director of Best Foreign Film	Louis Malle	Won	
1989	Bodil Awards	Best European Film	Louis Malle	Won	
1989	Chicago Film Critics Association	Best Foreign Language Film	Au revoir les enfants	Won	
1989	Guild of German Art House Cinemas	Foreign Film (Silver)	Au revoir les enfants	Won	
1989	London Film Critics' Circle	Foreign Language Film of the Year	Au revoir les enfants	Won	
1989	SESC Film Festival	Best Foreign Film	Louis Malle	Won	
2022	Online Film & Television Association	Film Hall of Fame (Motion Picture)	Au revoir les enfants	Awarded	

== Legacy ==
The film was included by the Vatican in a list of important films compiled in 1995, under the category of "Values".

== See also ==
- List of submissions to the 60th Academy Awards for Best Foreign Language Film
- List of French submissions for the Academy Award for Best Foreign Language Film
