= Cross (1987 film) =

- Directed by: Philippe Setbon
- Written by: Philippe Setbon
- Produced by: André Djaoui
- Starring: Michel Sardou; Roland Giraud
- Cinematography: Jacques Steyn
- Edited by: Nicole Lubtchansky
- Music by: Michel Goguelat
- Release date: 6 February 1987
- Running time: 87
- Countries: France; Canada
- Language: French

Cross is a French crime film written and directed by Philippe Setbon.

== Synopsis ==
The divorced cop Eli Cantor once brought a man named Simon Leenhardt behind bars. Leenhardt has sworn revenge to Cantor. He escapes from an insane asylum for criminals and breaks into the house where Cantor's family lives. With a team of psychopaths he takes everybody in the house as hostage. Eli feels he can't risk to ask for official help. He plans to tackle the situation discretely. Unfortunately his best friend in the police force refuses to help him. So Eli looks out for another potential partner. He comes across the adventurer Thomas Crosky who engages in illegal fights just for kicks. Together they sneak into the house. Meanwhile Leenhardt tries to make friends with Cantor's family but his manic accomplices get more and more out of control.

== Cast ==
- Michel Sardou: Thomas Crosky ("Cross")
- Roland Giraud: Eli Cantor
- Patrick Bauchau: Simon Leenhardt
- Marie-Anne Chazel: Catherine Crosky
- Maxime Leroux: Sandro
- Stéphane Jobert: Jacques Kester
- Gérard Zalcberg: Georges 'Rudi' Rudicek
- Arnold Boiseau: Farrel
- Philippe Polet: Caïn
- Jean Barney: Inspecteur
- Loïc Bitout: Claire's fiancé
- Louba Guertchikoff: Diane
