= Myriam David =

French psychoanalyst

Myriam David (15 March 1917 – 28 December 2004) was a French psychoanalyst.
