= Maxime Leroux =

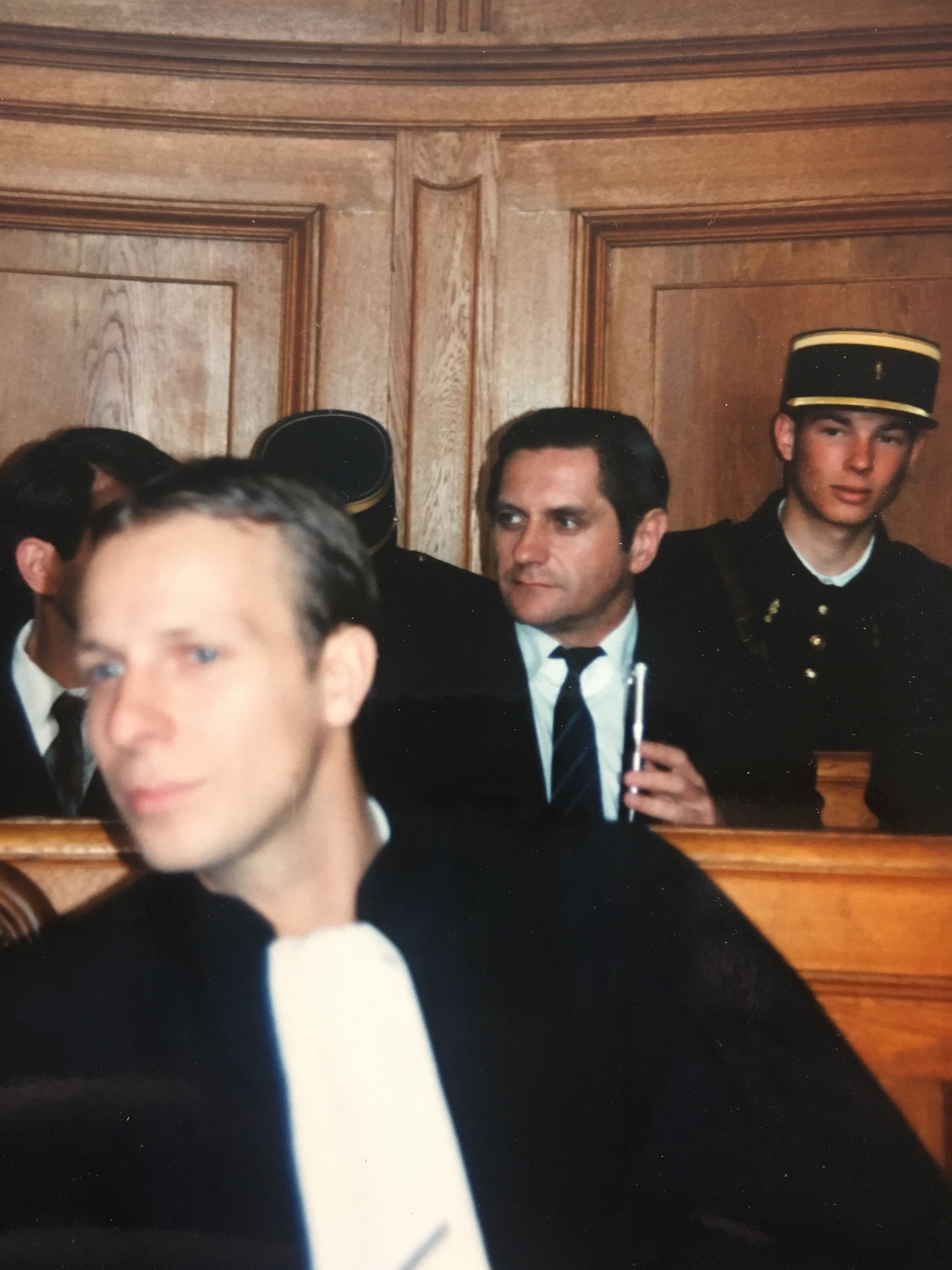
Maxime Leroux

Maxime Leroux (26 March 1951 – 21 January 2010) was a French actor.

== Partial filmography ==
- Les manèges de l'imaginaire (1982) - L'homme amnésique
- Effraction (1983) - Un gangster
- Le transfuge (1985)
- Disorder (1986) - Propriétaire du magasin
- Lévy et Goliath (1987) - Goliath
- Cross (1987) - Sandro
- Le moustachu (1987) - Richard Staub - le chef des terroristes
- Agent trouble (1987) - Le docteur Arms
- Beatrice (1987) - Richard / Knight
- La maison de Jeanne (1988) - Marc
- Chouans! (1988) - Le Prêtre réfractaire
- Camille Claudel (1988) - Claude Debussy
- Baxter (1989) - Baxter (voice)
- Mama, There's a Man in Your Bed (1989) - Cloquet
- Hiver 54, l'abbé Pierre (1989) - Le député Robert Buron
- Mister Frost (1990) - Frank Larcher
- Jean Galmot, aventurier (1990) - Antoine Charas
- Milena (1991)
- Netchaïev est de retour (1991) - Elie
- Aujourd'hui peut-être... (1991) - Raphaël
- La tribu (1991) - François
- Terre rouge (1991) - Max
- Dien Bien Phu (1992) - Artillery Lieutenant
- Tango (1993) - Mariano Escobar
- Un crime (1993) - Le concierge
- Justinien Trouvé, ou le bâtard de Dieu (1993) - Le capitaine milicien
- Faut-il aimer Mathilde? (1993) - Jacques
- Son of the Shark (1993) - Le père
- Montparnasse-Pondichéry (1994) - Felix
- Colonel Chabert (1994) - Le clerc Godeschal
- Excentric paradis (1996) - Raymond
- La nave de los sueños (1996)
- Fallait pas!... (1996) - Un spire
- Corto Maltese: La cour secrète des Arcanes (2002) - Nino (voice)
- Corto Maltese - Sous le signe du capricorne (2002)
- Burnt Out (2005) - Inspecteur parisien
- Un printemps à Paris (2006) - Denis
- The Easy Way (2008) - '68'
