= Nils Tavernier =

French actor and film director

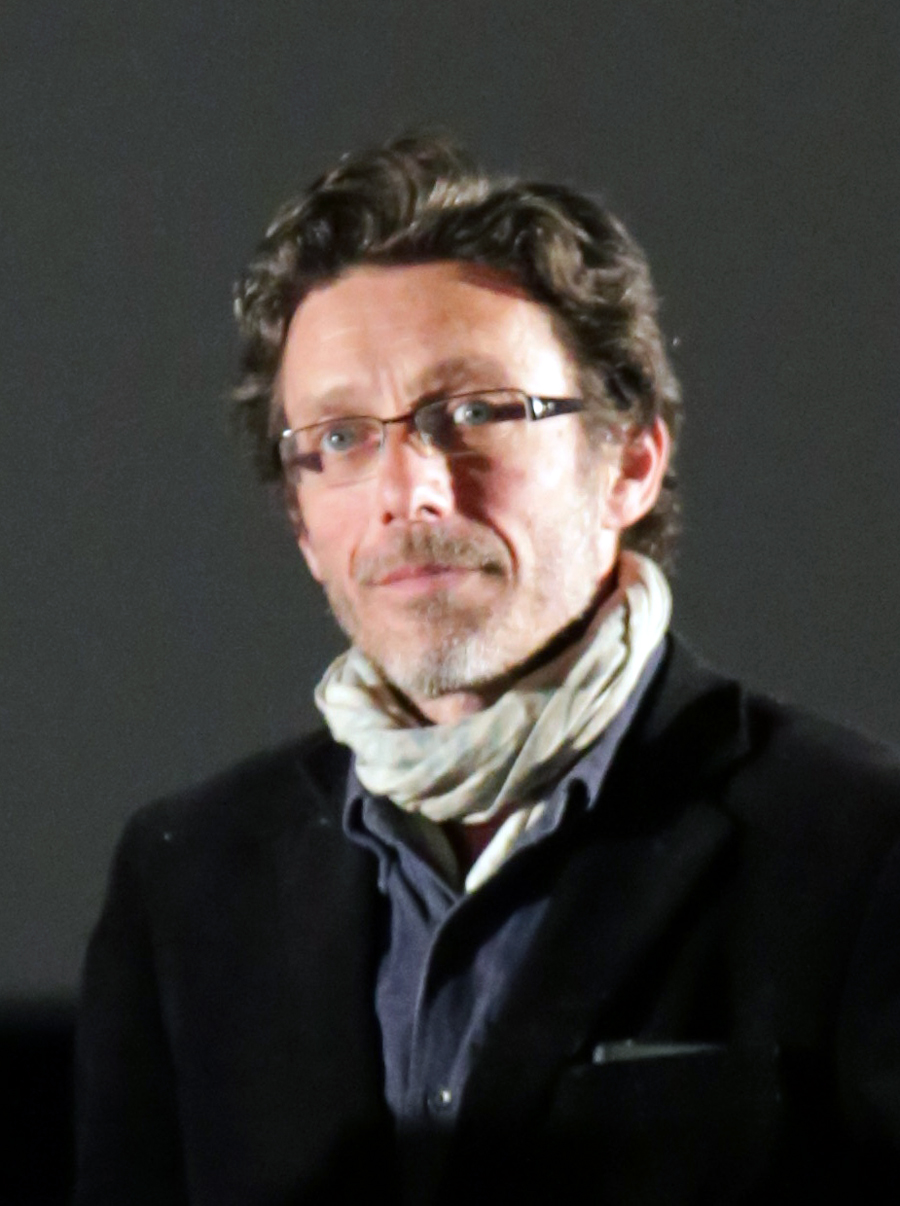
- Tavernier at the premiere of De toutes nos forces, 2014
- Born: 1 September 1965 (age 60)
- Occupations: Actor, director, writer
- Years active: 1977–present
- Parents: Bertrand Tavernier (father); Colo Tavernier O'Hagan (mother)
- Website: www.nilstavernier.com

Nils Tavernier (born 1 September 1965) is a French actor and director. He is best known for his film appearances in Beatrice (1987), Valmont (1988), and Revenge of the Musketeers (1994), and for his directorial efforts The Other Side of the Tracks (1997), Etoiles: Dancers of the Paris Opera Ballet (2001), and Les enfants de Thiès (2001). He is the son of film director Bertrand Tavernier.

== Biography ==
Nils Tavernier was born on 1 September 1965 in Normandy, France, the son of director, screenwriter, actor, and producer Bertrand Tavernier and Colo Tavernier O'Hagan. Tavernier made his first screen appearance in a film by his father, Spoiled Children in 1977 while still a teenager. He landed additional roles in feature films such as Beatrice in 1987, L.627 in 1991, and Revenge of the Musketeers in 1993 which was directed by his father. He also played supporting roles in Claude Chabrol's drama film Story of Women (1988) and Miloš Forman's period film Valmont (1988). He also appeared in Brigitte Roüan's After Sex in 1996, and Sylvie Verheyde's Un frère... in 1997.

Tavernier started his career as a director making short films and documentaries. In Etoiles: Dancers of the Paris Opera Ballet (2001), he explored his passion for dance with Etoiles. He co-directed with his father the documentary Histoires de vies brisées: les 'double peine' de Lyon (2001). In 2009, he directed the documentary The Mystery of Twins. In 2012, he performed with Gil Rabier a documentary about medical errors, What is left of our mistakes? This film is supported by the French Ministry of Health and Public-Hôpitaux de Paris. In 2013, he returned to the themes of childhood, disability, and commitment with the film Of all our forces.

Tavernier has also directed two documentaries for television: L'odyssée de la vie in 2004, in which he questioned the sexuality of the French, and L'odyssée de la vie in 2006, following a woman throughout her pregnancy and its affirmation as a mom within the couple. His most recent film is The Finishers (2013). Tavernier also authored The Mystery of Twins with Marie-Noelle Humbert in 2009.

In 2024, He was accused by three women of sexual assault.
