= Pascal Adant =

Belgian film and television director, screenwriter, producer, animator and composer

- Born: 8 July 1971 (age 54); Soignies, Belgium
- Occupation: Filmmaker
- Years active: 1998–present

Pascal Adant (born 8 July 1971) is a Belgian film and television director, screenwriter, producer, animator and composer.

== Filmography ==
- 1998 - Derapages
- 2001 - Boom
- 2002 - Fate
- 2005 - Slow Motion
- 2008 - Le Vilain Petit Cone Noir
- 2008 - Let's Make A Movie
- 2009 - Home Sweet Home
- 2013 - Sunflower Seed
- 2014 - La Fontaine Turns Film-maker, The Crow and the Fox
- 2022 - Phenomenon

== Awards ==
- 2nd Prize, The Crow and the Fox at Chicago International Children's Film Festival.
