= Bertrand Tavernier =

French film director (1941–2021)

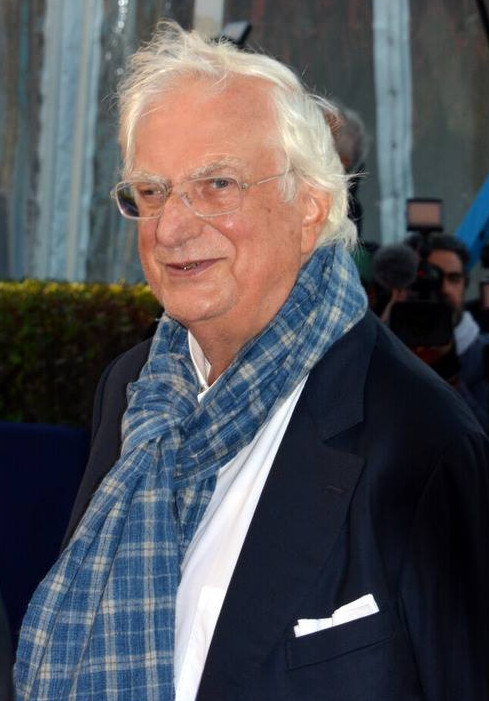
- Tavernier in 2017
- Born: 25 April 1941; Lyon, France
- Died: 25 March 2021 (aged 79); Sainte-Maxime, France
- Occupations: Director; screenwriter; producer; actor
- Years active: 1960–2016
- Spouse: Colo Tavernier O'Hagan (m. 1965; div. 1981)
- Children: 2; including Nils Tavernier

Bertrand Tavernier (French pronunciation: [bɛʁtʁɑ̃ tavɛʁnje]; 25 April 1941 – 25 March 2021) was a French film director, screenwriter, and producer.

== Life and career ==
Tavernier was born in Lyon, France, the son of Geneviève (née Dumond) and René Tavernier, a publicist and writer, several years president of the French PEN club. He said his father's publishing of a wartime resistance journal and aid to anti-Nazi intellectuals shaped his moral outlook as an artist. According to Tavernier, his father believed that words were "as important and as lethal as bullets". Tavernier's politics were influenced by the 1968 general strike in France. He was particularly struck by the writing of Leon Trotsky and associated with the OCI between 1973 and 1975.

Tavernier aspired to become a filmmaker from the time he was 13 or 14 years old. He cited John Ford, William Wellman, Jean Renoir, Jean Vigo and Jacques Becker as among his cinematic influences. He entered the film industry as a publicist, where he worked for Jean-Pierre Melville and Jean-Luc Godard. Later, his first film (The Clockmaker, 1974) won the Prix Louis Delluc and the Silver Bear – Special Jury Prize award at the 24th Berlin International Film Festival.

Tavernier's early films were often mysteries and thrillers that carried a social critique, such as The Judge and the Assassin (1976) and Coup de Torchon (1981), while his later work is characterized by a more overt social commentary, highlighting his left-wing views (Life and Nothing But (1989), Captain Conan (1996)) and presenting a critical picture of contemporary French society (It All Starts Today (1999), Histoires de vies brisées : les double-peine de Lyon (2001)).

== Honours and awards ==
In 1986, his film Round Midnight won two César Awards (Best Original Music and Best Sound), the Best Film Award at the Venice Film Festival and the Oscar for Best Music (Original Score) at the 1987 Academy Awards.

His film Life and Nothing But won the BAFTA for best film in a language other than English in 1990 and several César Awards, amongst others.

In 1995, his film L'Appât won the Golden Bear Award at the 45th Berlin International Film Festival. Four years later, his film It All Starts Today won an Honourable Mention at the 49th Berlin International Film Festival.

His film The Princess of Montpensier competed for the Palme d'Or at the 2010 Cannes Film Festival.

Tavernier was honored with a Lifetime Achievement Award at the 42nd International Film Festival of India in Goa for his outstanding achievements and work in the film industry.

== Personal life ==
Tavernier was married to screenwriter Colo Tavernier O'Hagan from 1965 to 1981. They had two children. Their son, Nils Tavernier (born 1 September 1965), works as both a director and actor. Their daughter, Tiffany Tavernier (born in 1967), is a novelist, screenwriter and assistant director.

== Death ==
Tavernier died on 25 March 2021 at age 79.

== Filmography ==
Short film

Year	Title	Director	Writer
1964	Les baisers	Yes	No
1964	La chance et l'amour	Yes	No
1983	La 8ème génération	Yes	Yes
1983	Ciné citron	Yes	Yes
1991	Contre l'oubli	Yes	No

Documentary film

Year	Title	Director	Producer	Writer	Notes
1982	Philippe Soupault	Yes	No	No	
1983	Mississippi Blues	Yes	Yes	No	Co-directed with Robert Parrish
1988	Lyon, le regard intérieur	Yes	No	Yes	
1991	Der grüne Berg	No	No	Yes	
1992	La guerre sans nom	Yes	No	Yes	
1994	Veillées d'armes	No	Yes	No	Co-directed by Marcel Ophüls
1997	De l'autre côté du périph	Yes	No	No	Co-directed with Nils Tavernier
2001	Histoires de vies brisées	Yes	No	No	Co-directed with Nils Tavernier
2016	Voyage à travers le cinéma français	Yes	Yes	No	
2016	Lumière ! L'aventure commence	No	Yes	No	

TV movie

- Les enfants de Thiès (2001)

Feature film

Year	Title	Director	Writer	Producer	Notes
1967	Mexican Slayride	No	Yes	No	Also press attaché
1968	Captain Singrid	No	Yes	No	
1974	The Clockmaker	Yes	Yes	No	L'Horloger de Saint-Paul
1975	Let Joy Reign Supreme	Yes	Yes	No	Que la fête commence...
1976	The Judge and the Assassin	Yes	Yes	No	
1977	Spoiled Children	Yes	Yes	No	Des enfants gâtés
1977	La question	No	No	Yes	
1979	Death Watch	Yes	Yes	Yes	La mort en direct
1980	A Week's Vacation	Yes	Yes	Yes	
1981	Coup de Torchon	Yes	Yes	No	
1983	La trace	No	Yes	Associate	
1984	A Sunday in the Country	Yes	Yes	Yes	
1986	Round Midnight	Yes	Yes	No	
1987	Beatrice	Yes	No	No	
1987	Les mois d'avril sont meurtriers	No	Yes	No	
1989	Life and Nothing But	Yes	Yes	No	
1990	Daddy Nostalgie	Yes	Yes	No	Also narrator
1992	L.627	Yes	Yes	No	
1994	Revenge of the Musketeers	Yes	Yes	No	
1995	The Bait	Yes	Yes	No	
1996	Captain Conan	Yes	Yes	No	
1999	It All Starts Today	Yes	Yes	No	
2001	Mon père, il m'a sauvé la vie	No	Yes	No	
2002	Safe Conduct	Yes	Yes	No	
2004	Holy Lola	Yes	Yes	No	
2008	Lucifer et moi	No	Yes	No	
2009	In the Electric Mist	Yes	No	No	
2010	The Princess of Montpensier	Yes	Yes	No	
2013	The French Minister (French: Quai d'Orsay)	Yes	Yes	No	Also actor

Other credits

Year	Title	Role	Notes
1960	Wen kümmert's?	Assistant Director	Short film
1962	The Bakery Girl of Monceau	Narrator	Short film
1963	Contempt	Publicist	Le Mépris
1963	Le Doulos	Production publicist	
1964	The Terror of Rome Against the Son of Hercules	Assistant Director	
1965	The 317th Platoon	Press attaché	
1966	A Question of Honour	Assistant Director	
1969	Orgasmo	Assistant Director	
1969	Tout peut arriver	Actor	
1970	Last Known Address	Press attaché	
1981	Le petit Mitchell illustré	Actor	Short film
1990	Un été après l'autre	Technical advisor	
1991	Ragazzi	Technical advisor	
1991	Jalousie	Technical advisor	
1997	Fred	Executive producer	
1997	Quand le chat sourit	Actor	Short film
2001	Pas d'histoires !	Co-Producer	

== Awards and nominations ==
Year	Title	Award/Nomination
1974	The Clockmaker	Berlin International Film Festival - OCIC Award; Berlin International Film Festival - Silver Berlin Bear; National Board of Review Award - Top Foreign Films; Louis Delluc Prize for Best First Film; Nominated - Berlin International Film Festival - Golden Berlin Bear
1975	Let Joy Reign Supreme	César Award for Best Director; César Award for Best Screenplay, Dialogue or Adaptation; French Syndicate of Cinema Critics - Best Film; Nominated - César Award for Best Film
1976	The Judge and the Assassin	César Award for Best Screenplay, Dialogue or Adaptation; Nominated - César Award for Best Film; Nominated - César Award for Best Director
1979	Death Watch	Nominated - César Award for Best Screenplay, Dialogue or Adaptation; Nominated - Berlin International Film Festival - Golden Berlin Bear; Nominated - Chicago International Film Festival - Best Feature
1980	A Week's Vacation	Nominated - Cannes Film Festival - Palme d'Or; Nominated - Chicago International Film Festival - Best Feature
1981	Coup de Torchon	French Syndicate of Cinema Critics - Best Film; Nominated - Academy Award for Best Foreign Language Film; Nominated - César Award for Best Film; Nominated - César Award for Best Director; Nominated - César Award for Best Screenplay, Dialogue or Adaptation
1984	A Sunday in the Country	Boston Society of Film Critics Award for Best Director; Boston Society of Film Critics Award for Best Foreign Language Film; Cannes Film Festival - Best Director; César Award for Best Adaptation; London Film Critics' Circle Award for Foreign Language Film of the Year; Mainichi Film Award for Foreign Film Best One Award; National Board of Review Award - Top Foreign Films; New York Film Critics Circle Award for Best Foreign Language Film; Kansas City Film Critics Circle Award for Best Foreign Film; Nominated - Golden Globe Award for Best Foreign Language Film; Nominated - BAFTA Award for Best Film Not in the English Language; Nominated - Cannes Film Festival - Palme d'Or; Nominated - César Award for Best Film; Nominated - César Award for Best Director; Nominated - National Society of Film Critics Award for Best Film; Nominated - National Society of Film Critics Award for Best Director; Nominated - National Society of Film Critics Award for Best Screenplay; Nominated - New York Film Critics Circle Award for Best Director
1986	Round Midnight	Bodil Award for Best Non-American Film; Italian National Syndicate of Film Journalists - Best Foreign Director; Venice Film Festival - Pasinetti Award; Nominated - National Board of Review: Top Ten Films; Nominated - New York Film Critics Circle Award for Best Foreign Language Film; Nominated - Venice Film Festival - Golden Lion
1989	Life and Nothing But	BAFTA Award for Best Film Not in the English Language; European Film Award - Special Prize of the Jury; Los Angeles Film Critics Association Award for Best Foreign Language Film; Tokyo International Film Festival - Best Artistic Contribution Award; Viareggio EuropaCinema - Best Film; Nominated - César Award for Best Film; Nominated - César Award for Best Director; Nominated - César Award for Best Original Screenplay or Adaptation; Nominated - David di Donatello for Best Foreign Film; Nominated - National Society of Film Critics Award for Best Foreign Language Film; Nominated - Tokyo International Film Festival - Tokyo Grand Prix
1990	Daddy Nostalgie	Nominated - Cannes Film Festival - Palme d'Or; Nominated - Chicago Film Critics Association Award for Best Foreign Language Film
1992	L.627	Nominated - César Award for Best Film; Nominated - César Award for Best Director; Nominated - César Award for Best Original Screenplay or Adaptation; Nominated - Venice Film Festival - Golden Lion
1992	La guerre sans nom	Bergamo Film Meeting - Special Mention
1995	The Bait	Berlin International Film Festival - Golden Bear; Nominated - Gramado Film Festival - Best Latin Film; Nominated - Italian National Syndicate of Film Journalists - European Silver Ribbon
1996	Captain Conan	César Award for Best Director; Denver Film Festival - Krzysztof Kieslowski Award; Denver Film Festival - People's Choice Award; French Syndicate of Cinema Critics - Best Film; San Sebastián International Film Festival - FIPRESCI Prize; San Sebastián International Film Festival - Solidarity Award; Nominated - César Award for Best Film; Nominated - César Award for Best Original Screenplay or Adaptation; Nominated - San Sebastián International Film Festival - Golden Seashell
1999	It All Starts Today	Berlin International Film Festival - FIPRESCI Prize; Berlin International Film Festival - Honorable Mention; Berlin International Film Festival - Prize of the Ecumenical Jury; Norwegian International Film Festival - Ecumenical Film Award; San Sebastián International Film Festival - Audience Award; Fotogramas de Plata - Best Foreign Film; Sant Jordi Award for Best Foreign Film; Turia Award for Audience Award; Turia Award for Best Foreign Film; Nominated - Berlin International Film Festival - Golden Bear; Nominated - Goya Award for Best European Film; Nominated - Political Film Society Award for Democracy; Nominated - Political Film Society Award for Exposé; Nominated - Political Film Society Award for Human Rights; Nominated - Cinema Writers Circle Award for Best Foreign Film
2002	Safe Conduct	Ft. Lauderdale International Film Festival - Best Film; Ft. Lauderdale International Film Festival - Best Director; Ft. Lauderdale International Film Festival - Best Screenplay; Nominated - Berlin International Film Festival - Golden Bear
2004	Holy Lola	San Sebastián International Film Festival - Audience Award
2009	In the Electric Mist	Nominated - Berlin International Film Festival - Golden Bear
2010	The Princess of Montpensier	Philadelphia Film Festival - Audience Award - Honorable Mention; Nominated - Cannes Film Festival - Palme d'Or; Nominated - Chicago International Film Festival - Best Feature; Nominated - César Award for Best Adaptation
2013	The French Minister (French: Quai d'Orsay)	San Sebastián International Film Festival - Best Screenplay; Nominated - César Award for Best Adaptation; Nominated - Lumière Award for Best Film; Nominated - Lumière Award for Best Director; Nominated - Lumière Award for Best Screenplay; Nominated - San Sebastián International Film Festival - Best Film
2016	Voyage à travers le cinéma français	Nominated - Cannes Film Festival - L'Œil d'or
