= Marion Cotillard on screen and stage =

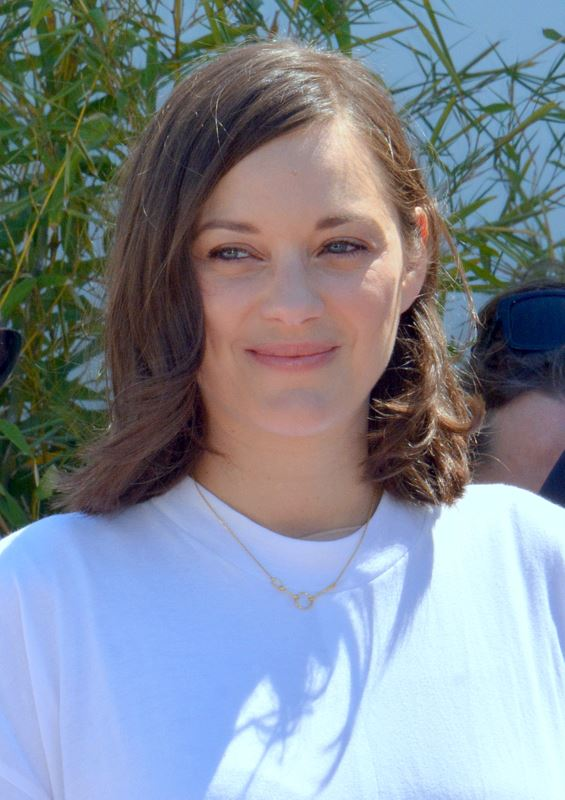
Cotillard at the 2017 Cannes Film Festival

Marion Cotillard is a French actress. She is known for her roles on stage and screen. She has received numerous awards and nominations and as of 2026, Cotillard's films have grossed more than $3.7 billion at the worldwide box-office and have sold more than 76 million admissions in France.

Cotillard began her career acting in short films at the age of 6. She had her first English-language role in the television series Highlander (1993). She made her feature film debut in the French romantic comedy The Story of a Boy Who Wanted to Be Kissed (1994). She had her breakthrough role in the action comedy Taxi (1998), earning a nomination for the César Award for Best Promising Actress, and reprised her role in the sequels Taxi 2 (2000) and Taxi 3 (2003). She made her Hollywood debut with a small role in Big Fish (2003), won her first César Award for Best Supporting Actress for A Very Long Engagement (2004), and had her first major English-language role in A Good Year (2006).

She won the Academy Award for Best Actress for her portrayal of French singer Édith Piaf in La Vie en Rose (2007). She received her second Oscar nomination for her role as a depressed factory worker in Two Days, One Night (2014). She has also starred in French-language films such as Pretty Things (2001), Love Me If You Dare (2003), Rust and Bone (2012), Annette (2021) and Little Girl Blue (2023), as well as in major English-language films such as Public Enemies (2009), Nine (2009), Inception (2010), Contagion (2011), Midnight in Paris (2011), The Dark Knight Rises (2012), The Immigrant (2013), Macbeth (2015), Allied (2016), and Lee (2023).

On stage, Cotillard has portrayed Joan of Arc in numerous productions of Joan of Arc at the Stake in several countries since 2005.

== Filmography ==
=== Feature films ===
Key
†	Denotes films that have not yet been released

List of Marion Cotillard film credits
Year	Title	Role	Notes or original title
1994	The Story of a Boy Who Wanted to Be Kissed	Mathilde	L'Histoire du garçon qui voulait qu'on l'embrasse
1996	My Sex Life... or How I Got into an Argument	Student	Comment je me suis disputé... (ma vie sexuelle)
1996	La Belle Verte	Macha	
1998	Taxi	Lilly Bertineau	
1999	War in the Highlands	Julie Bonzon	La Guerre dans le Haut Pays
1999	Furia	Élia	
1999	Blue Away to America	Solange	Du bleu jusqu'en Amérique
2000	Taxi 2	Lilly Bertineau	
2001	Lisa	Young Lisa	
2001	Pretty Things	Marie / Lucie	Les Jolies Choses
2002	A Private Affair	Clarisse Entoven	Une affaire privée
2003	Taxi 3	Lilly Bertineau	
2003	Love Me If You Dare	Sophie Kowalsky	Jeux d'enfants
2003	Big Fish	Joséphine Bloom	First English-language film
2004	Innocence	Mademoiselle Éva	
2004	A Very Long Engagement	Tina Lombardi	Un long dimanche de fiançailles
2005	Cavalcade	Alizée	
2005	Love Is in the Air	Alice	Ma vie en l'air
2005	Mary	Gretchen Mol	
2005	Burnt Out	Lisa	Sauf le respect que je vous dois
2005	The Black Box	Isabelle Kruger / Alice	La Boîte Noire
2005	Edy	Céline / Dream Singer	
2006	Toi et moi	Léna	
2006	Dikkenek	Nadine	
2006	Fair Play	Nicole	
2006	A Good Year	Fanny Chenal	
2007	La Vie en Rose	Édith Piaf	La môme
2009	Public Enemies	Billie Frechette	
2009	The Last Flight	Marie Vallières de Beaumont	Le dernier vol
2009	Nine	Luisa Contini	
2010	Inception	Mal	
2010	Little White Lies	Marie	Les petits mouchoirs
2011	Midnight in Paris	Adriana	
2011	Contagion	Dr. Leonora Orantes	
2012	Rust and Bone	Stéphanie	De Rouille et D'os
2012	The Dark Knight Rises	Miranda Tate / Talia al Ghul	
2013	The Immigrant	Ewa Cybulska	
2013	Blood Ties	Monica	
2013	Anchorman 2: The Legend Continues	CBC News Co-host	Cameo
2014	Two Days, One Night	Sandra Bya	Deux jours, une nuit
2015	The Little Prince	The Rose	Voice
2015	Macbeth	Lady Macbeth	
2016	It's Only the End of the World	Catherine	Juste la fin du monde
2016	From the Land of the Moon	Gabrielle	Mal de Pierres
2016	Allied	Marianne Beauséjour	
2016	Assassin's Creed	Dr. Sofia Rikkin	
2017	Rock'n Roll	Marion Cotillard	
2017	Ismael's Ghosts	Carlotta	Les Fantômes d'Ismaël
2018	Angel Face	Marlène	Gueule d'ange
2019	Little White Lies 2	Marie	Nous finirons ensemble
2020	Dolittle	Tutu	Voice
2021	Annette	Ann Defrasnoux	
2022	Brother and Sister	Alice	Frère et Sœur
2023	Asterix & Obelix: The Middle Kingdom	Cleopatra / Tipsy	Astérix et Obélix: l'Empire du Milieu
2023	Little Girl Blue	Carole Achache	
2023	The Inventor	Louise de Savoy	Voice
2023	Lee	Solange d'Ayen	
2025	The Ice Tower	Cristina / The Snow Queen	
2026	Karma	Jeanne	
2026	Roma Elastica	Eddie	
2026	Milo †	Alice	Post-production
TBA	The Enraged †	Anne Kadarn	Post-production
TBA	The Turning Door †	TBA	Filming, voice

=== Short films ===
List of Marion Cotillard short film credits
Year	Title	Role	Director
1995	Snuff Movie		Olivier Van Hoofstadt
1996	Insalata Mista	Juliette	Emmanuel Hamon
1997	Affaire classée	Nathalie	Luc Gallissaires
1997	La sentence		Mauro Losa
1998	La surface de réparation	Stella	Valérie Müller
1999	L'appel de la cave	Rachel	Mathieu Mercier
2000	Quelques jours de trop		Franck Guérin
2000	Le marquis		Gilles Paquet-Brenner
2001	Heureuse	La virtuelle de 35 kg.	Céline Nieszawer
2001	Boomer	Mme Boomer	Karim Adda
2009	Lady Noire Affair	Lady Noire	Olivier Dahan
2010	Lady Rouge	Lady Rouge	Jonas Åkerlund
2010	Lady Blue Shanghai	Lady Blue	David Lynch
2010	Lady Grey London	Lady Grey	John Cameron Mitchell
2011	L.A.dy Dior	Margaux	John Cameron Mitchell
2022	Rencontre(s)	Coco Chanel (voice)	Mathias Chelebourg

=== Television ===
List of Marion Cotillard television credits
Year	Title	Role	Notes
1982	Le monde des tout-petits	Marion	Short film
1983	Lucie		Short film
1993	Étude sur le Mouvement	Fairy	Segment: "Intériorité"
1993	Highlander	Lori Bellian	Episodes: "Saving Grace" and "Nowhere to Run"
1994	Extrême Limite	Sophie Colbert	Episodes: "Père et fille" and "La pistonnée"
1996	Théo la tendresse	Laura	Episode: "La nouvelle de la semaine"
1996	Chloé	Chloé	Television film
1996	L'@mour est à réinventer	Laurence	Episode: "La mouette"
1998	Interdit de Vieillir	Abigail Dougnac	Television film
2001	Les Redoutables	Gabby	Episode: "Doggy dog"
2001	Une femme piégée (aka Vertigo: A Woman in Danger)	Florence Lacaze	Television film
2005	Une américaine à Paris	Herself	Television film
2008	Génération duo	Herself	Television film
2013	Le Débarquement	Nathalie the Bear	1 episode
2014	Comedy Central's All-Star Non-Denominational Christmas Special	Herself	1 episode
2015	Castings	Herself	Rap battle with Nekfeu and Orelsan (1 episode)
2021	La Vengeance au Triple Galop	Kim Randall	Television film
2023	Extrapolations	Sylvie Bolo	Episode: "2068: The Going Away Party"
2025	Sausage Party: Foodtopia	Dijon	TV series; season 2
2025	Drag Race France All Stars	Herself	Guest judge; Episode: "Super Ball"
2025	The Morning Show	Celine Dumont	Season 4; main role

=== Voice work ===
Cotillard has narrated several documentaries and dubbed several animated films in France and in the U.S., and also dubbed in French all of her roles in English-language films.

List of Marion Cotillard voice work credits
Year	Title	Role	Notes
2003	Big Fish	Joséphine Bloom	French version
2004	Cinq Contes Musicaux Pour les Petits	Narrator	Children's audio book (in French)
2005	Mary	Gretchen Mol	French version
2006	Happy Feet	Gloria	French version only
2009	Public Enemies	Billie Frechette	French version
2009	Nine	Luisa Contini	French version
2009	OceanWorld 3D	Sea Turtle	Documentary (French version)
2010	Inception	Mal	French version
2011	Midnight in Paris	Adriana	French version
2011	Contagion	Dr. Leonora Orantes	French version
2012	The Dark Knight Rises	Miranda Tate	French version
2013	The Immigrant	Ewa Cybulska	French version
2013	Blood Ties	Monica	French version
2014	Terre des Ours	Narrator	Documentary (French version)
2014	The Amazon's Silent Crisis	Narrator	Short Film for Greenpeace (English version)
2015	Minions	Scarlet Overkill	French version only
2015	April and the Extraordinary World	Avril	a.k.a. Avril et le Monde truqué, original French version
2015	Unity	Narrator	Documentary (in English)
2015	Home	Narrator	Short Film (French version)
2016	Allied	Marianne Beausejour	French version
2016	Assassin's Creed	Dr. Sofia Rikkin	French version
2017	Assassin's Creed: Origins	Dr. Sofia Rikkin	Cameo appearance
2018	Dans les yeux de Thomas Pesquet	Narrator	Documentary (Original French version)
2018	Vestige	Narrator	Documentary (French version)
2021	Charlotte	Charlotte Salomon	French version; also executive producer
2024	Olympics! The French Games	Narrator	Documentary
2025	Sausage Party: Foodtopia	Dijon	TV series

=== Music videos ===
List of music video appearances, showing year released, artist(s) and director(s)
Year	Title	Artist(s)	Director(s)	Ref.
1990	Petite fille	Les Wampas	Unknown	
2003	No Reason to Cry Out Your Eyes	Hawksley Workman	Unknown	
2004	Givin'Up	Richard Archer and Tommy Hools	Unknown	
2009	Beds Are Burning	TckTckTck – Time for Climate Justice	Chic & Artistic	
2010	More Than Meets the Eye	Yodelice	Unknown	
2010	Breathe In	Yodelice	Unknown	
2010	Take It All (from the film Nine)	Marion Cotillard	Rob Marshall	
2010	The Eyes of Mars	Marion Cotillard and Franz Ferdinand	Jonas Åkerlund	
2012	Lily's Body	Marion Cotillard	Eliott Bliss	
2013	The Next Day	David Bowie	Floria Sigismondi	
2014	Snapshot in LA / Lady Dior – Enter the Game	Marion Cotillard	Eliott Bliss and Marion Cotillard	

=== As producer ===
List of Marion Cotillard film credits
Year	Title	Notes or original title
2021	Bigger Than Us	Documentary

== Theatre ==
Since 2005, Cotillard has acted in several production of Joan of Arc with Oratorio by Arthur Honegger and libretto by Paul Claudel.

List of Marion Cotillard theatrical credits
Year	Production	Role	Location	Date	Director	Ref.
1997	Y'a des Nounours Dans les Placards	Unknown	Théâtre Contemporain de la Danse, France		Laurent Cotillard	
2005	Joan of Arc at the Stake	Joan of Arc	Palais des Sports d'Orléans, Orléans, France	5–6 May 2005	Jean-Marc Cochereau	
2012	Joan of Arc at the Stake	Joan of Arc	L'Auditori de Barcelona, Barcelona, Spain	17 November 2012	Marc Soustrot	
2015	Joan of Arc at the Stake	Joan of Arc	Rainier III Auditorium, Monaco	8 February 2015	Kazuki Yamada	
2015	Joan of Arc at the Stake	Joan of Arc	Théâtre du Capitole, Toulouse, France	14 February 2015	Kazuki Yamada	
2015	Joan of Arc at the Stake	Joan of Arc	Philharmonie, Grande Salle, Paris, France	3–4 March 2015	Kazuki Yamada	
2015	Joan of Arc at the Stake	Joan of Arc	Avery Fisher Hall, New York City, NY	10–13 June 2015	Côme de Bellescize	
2018	Joan of Arc at the Stake	Joan of Arc	Spoleto Festival dei Due Mondi, Piazza del Duomo, Spoleto, Italy	18 July 2018	Benoît Jacquot	
2019	Joan of Arc at the Stake	Joan of Arc	Romanian Athenaeum, Bucharest, Romania	19 September 2019	Alexandre Bloch	
2022	Joan of Arc at the Stake	Joan of Arc	Teatro Real, Madrid, Spain	7–17 June 2022	Juanjo Mena	
2024	Joan of Arc at the Stake	Joan of Arc	Berliner Philharmonie, Berlin, Germany	6–8 June 2024	Côme de Bellescize	
