= List of awards and nominations received by Marion Cotillard =

Marion Cotillard awards and nominations
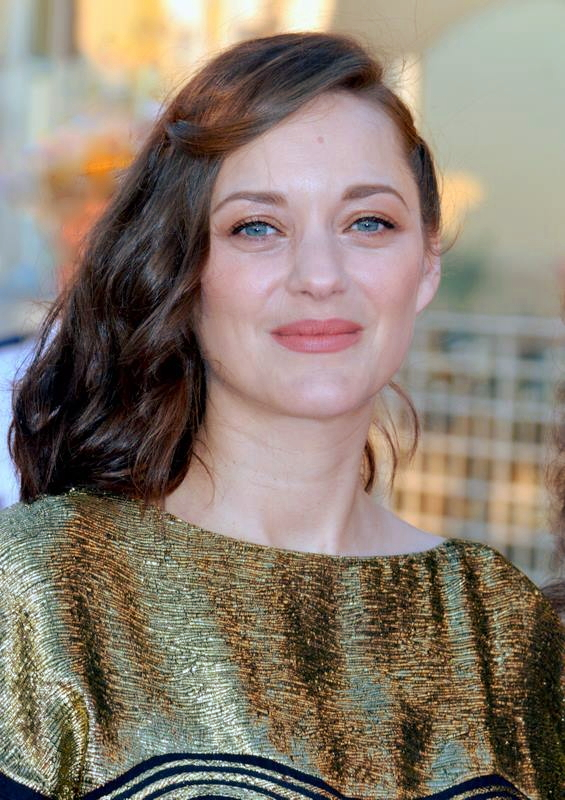
- Cotillard at the Cabourg Film Festival in 2017
Awards and nominations
Award	Wins	Nominations
Academy Awards	1	2
BAFTA Awards	1	2
César Awards	2	8
Golden Globes	1	4
SAG Awards	0	4

Totals (Note: Certain award groups do not simply award one winner. They acknowledge several different recipients, have runners-up, and have third place. Since this is a specific recognition and is different from losing an award, runner-up mentions are considered wins in this award tally. For simplification and to avoid errors, each award in this list has been presumed to have had a prior nomination.)
- Wins: 31
- Nominations: 70

This is a list of awards and nominations received by Marion Cotillard.

Marion Cotillard is a French actress known for her leading roles in both French and American films. She has received numerous accolades including an Academy Award, a British Academy Film Award, a Cannes Film Festival Award, two César Award, a Golden Globe Award, as well as nominations for four Critics' Choice Movie Awards and four Screen Actors Guild Awards. On 14 July 2016, Cotillard received France's highest honour—she was named a Knight of the Legion of Honour. Cotillard will receive a star on the Hollywood Walk of Fame in 2026. (Note: It was announced on July 2, 2025 that she would receive the honor for her contributions to motion picutres)

Cotillard's early films include the action comedy Taxi (1998) and the drama Pretty Things (2001) earned her nominations for the César Award for Most Promising Actress. For her role in the romantic war drama A Very Long Engagement (2004), she won the César Award for Best Supporting Actress. That same year she was awarded with the Cannes Film Festival's Trophée Chopard. Cotillard earned widespread acclaim for her portrayal of Édith Piaf in the musical drama La Vie en Rose (2007) she won an Academy Award for Best Actress, becoming only the second French cinema actress (Note: after Simone Signoret in the 1959 British film Room at the Top, to win this award and the third overall to receive an Academy Award (Juliette Binoche won the Academy Award for Best Supporting Actress in 1997 for her role in American film The English Patient). Cotillard is the first Best Actress winner in a non-English language performance since Sophia Loren's win in 1961 for the Italian film Two Women) She also won a BAFTA Award, a César Award, Golden Globe Award, and a Screen Actors Guild Award.

She starred in the English-language musical Nine (2009) where she played Luisa Contini, earning nominations for the Golden Globe Award for Best Actress – Motion Picture Musical or Comedy and the Critics' Choice Movie Award for Best Supporting Actress. In 2012, Cotillard played Stéphanie, a woman who loses her legs in the romantic drama Rust and Bone where she received nominations for the BAFTA Award for Best Actress in a Leading Role, the César Award for Best Actress, the Critics' Choice Movie Award for Best Actress, Golden Globe Award for Best Actress in a Motion Picture – Drama, and the Screen Actors Guild Award for Outstanding Actress in a Leading Role.

Cotillard portrayed a depressed factory worker trying to keep her job in the Dardenne brothers drama film Two Days, One Night (2014), earning nominations for the Academy Award for Best Actress, the César Award for Best Actress, and the Critics' Choice Movie Award for Best Actress. (Note: Cotillard is the fourth actress overall to receive two Academy Award nominations for Best Actress for non-English language films, following Sophia Loren, Liv Ullmann and Adjani.) That same year she starred as Polish immigrant in the James Gray drama The Immigrant (2013) where she earned the New York Film Critics Circle Award and a National Society of Film Critics Award for Best Actress. (Note: Cotillard, Isabelle Huppert, and Isabelle Adjani are the only French actresses to win the New York Film Critics Circle Award for Best Actress.) She starred in the romantic musical film Annette (2021) for which she was nominated for the Golden Globe Award. She earned nominations for the César Award for Best Actress for From the Land of the Moon (2017) and Little Girl Blue (2023), for the latter she became the first actress to be nominated for a César Award for a documentary film.

== Major associations ==
=== Academy Awards ===
Year	Category	Nominated work	Result	Ref.
2008	Best Actress	La Vie en Rose	Won	
2015	Best Actress	Two Days, One Night	Nominated	

=== BAFTA Awards ===
Year	Category	Nominated work	Result	Ref.
British Academy Film Awards
2008	Best Film Actress in a Leading Role	La Vie en Rose	Won	
2013	Best Film Actress in a Leading Role	Rust and Bone	Nominated	

=== César Awards ===
Year	Category	Nominated work	Result	Ref.
1999	Most Promising Actress	Taxi	Nominated	
2002	Most Promising Actress	Pretty Things	Nominated	
2005	Best Supporting Actress	A Very Long Engagement	Won	
2008	Best Actress	La Vie en Rose	Won	
2013	Best Actress	Rust and Bone	Nominated	
2015	Best Actress	Two Days, One Night	Nominated	
2017	Best Actress	From the Land of the Moon	Nominated	
2024	Best Actress	Little Girl Blue	Nominated	

=== Critics' Choice Awards ===
Year	Category	Nominated work	Result	Ref.
Critics' Choice Movie Awards
2008	Best Actress	La Vie en Rose	Nominated	
2010	Best Supporting Actress	Nine	Nominated	
2013	Best Actress	Rust and Bone	Nominated	
2015	Best Actress	Two Days, One Night	Nominated	

=== Golden Globe Awards ===
Year	Category	Nominated work	Result	Ref.
2008	Best Actress – Motion Picture Comedy or Musical	La Vie en Rose	Won	
2010	Best Actress – Motion Picture Comedy or Musical	Nine	Nominated	
2013	Best Actress in a Motion Picture – Drama	Rust and Bone	Nominated	
2022	Best Actress in a Motion Picture – Musical or Comedy	Annette	Nominated	

=== Screen Actors Guild Awards ===
Year	Category	Nominated work	Result	Ref.
2008	Outstanding Actress in a Motion Picture	La Vie en Rose	Nominated	
2010	Outstanding Ensemble Cast in a Motion Picture	Nine	Nominated	
2012	Outstanding Ensemble Cast in a Motion Picture	Midnight in Paris	Nominated	
2013	Outstanding Actress in a Motion Picture	Rust and Bone	Nominated	

== Miscellaneous awards ==
Organizations	Year	Category	Work	Result	Ref.
Autrans Mountain Film Festival	1999	Special Mention - Best Actress	War in the Highlands	Won	
Better World Fund	2022	Best Achievement	Bigger Than Us	Won	
Cannes Film Festival	2004	Trophée Chopard	Female Revelation of the Year	Won	
European Film Awards	2007	Best European Actress	La Vie en Rose	Nominated	
European Film Awards	2014	Best European Actress	Two Days, One Night	Won	
Newport Beach Film Festival	2004	Jury Award - Best Actress (Feature Film Drama)	Love Me If You Dare	Won	
Lumière Awards	2008	Best Actress	La Vie en Rose	Won	
Lumière Awards	2013	Best Actress	Rust and Bone	Nominated	
Lumière Awards	2017	Best Actress	From the Land of the Moon	Nominated	
Lumière Awards	2017	Honorary Lumiere Award	—N/a	Won	
Palm Springs International Film Festival	2008	Breakthrough Performance Award	La Vie en Rose	Won	
Palm Springs International Film Festival	2010	Desert Palm Achievement Award - Best Actress	Nine	Won	
Riveria International Film Festival	2017	Jury Prize for Best Actress	It's Only the End of the World	Won	
Sannio FilmFest	2012	Golden Capital for Best Actress	La Vie en Rose	Won	
Schermi d'Amore Verona Film Festival	2001	Best Actress	Lisa	Won	
Seattle International Film Festival	2007	Best Actress	La Vie en Rose	Won	
Trophées Francophones du Cinéma	2015	Best Actress	Two Days, One Night	Nominated	

== Film critic awards ==
Year	Association	Category	Project	Result	Ref.
2007	African-American Film Critics Association	Best Actress	La Vie en Rose	Nominated	
2007	Alliance of Women Film Journalists	Best Actress	La Vie en Rose	Nominated	
2007	Boston Society of Film Critics Awards	Best Actress	La Vie en Rose	Won	
2007	Chicago Film Critics Association Awards	Best Actress	La Vie en Rose	Nominated	
2007	Dallas-Fort Worth Film Critics Association Awards	Best Actress	La Vie en Rose	Nominated	
2007	Detroit Film Critics Society Awards	Best Actress	La Vie en Rose	Nominated	
2007	Dublin Film Critics Circle Awards	Best Actress	La Vie en Rose	Nominated	
2007	Houston Film Critics Society Awards	Best Actress	La Vie en Rose	Nominated	
2007	Kansas City Film Critics Circle	Best Actress	La Vie en Rose	Won	
2007	London Critics Circle Film Awards	Actress of the Year	La Vie en Rose	Won	
2007	Los Angeles Film Critics Association Awards	Best Actress	La Vie en Rose	Won	
2007	National Society of Film Critics Awards	Best Actress	La Vie en Rose	Nominated	
2007	St. Louis Film Critics Association	Best Actress	La Vie en Rose	Nominated	
2007	Vancouver Film Critics Circle	Best Actress	La Vie en Rose	Won	
2009	Dallas–Fort Worth Film Critics Association Awards	Best Supporting Actress	Nine	Nominated	
2009	Detroit Film Critics Society Awards	Best Supporting Actress	Nine	Nominated	
2009	St. Louis Gateway Film Critics Association Awards	Best Supporting Actress	Nine	Nominated	
2012	Dublin Film Critics Circle	Best Actress	Rust and Bone	Runner-up	
2012	Georgia Film Critics Association	Best Actress	Rust and Bone	Nominated	
2012	Vancouver Film Critics Circle	Best Actress	Rust and Bone	Nominated	
2012	Washington D.C. Area Film Critics Association	Best Actress	Rust and Bone	Nominated	
2014	Boston Online Film Critics Association	Best Actress	Two Days, One Night	Won	
2014	Boston Society of Film Critics	Best Actress (Note: Shared with her performance in The Immigrant)	Two Days, One Night	Won	
2014	Chicago Film Critics Association	Best Actress	Two Days, One Night	Nominated	
2014	Dallas–Fort Worth Film Critics Association Awards	Best Actress	Two Days, One Night	Nominated	
2014	Denver Film Critics Society	Best Actress	Two Days, One Night	Nominated	
2014	Dublin Film Critics' Circle	Best Actress	Two Days, One Night	Won	
2014	Florida Film Critics Circle	Best Actress	Two Days, One Night	Won	
2014	Georgia Film Critics Association	Best Actress	Two Days, One Night	Won	
2014	Houston Film Critics Society	Best Actress	Two Days, One Night	Nominated	
2014	IndieWire Critics Poll	Best Actress	Two Days, One Night	Won	
2014	London Film Critics Circle Award	Best Actress	Two Days, One Night	Nominated	
2014	National Society of Film Critics Awards	Best Actress (Note: (shared with her performance in The Immigrant))	Two Days, One Night	Won	
2014	New York Film Critics Circle	Best Actress	Two Days, One Night	Won	
2014	North Carolina Film Critics Association	Best Actress	Two Days, One Night	Nominated	
2014	Online Film & Television Association	Best Actress	Two Days, One Night	Nominated	
2014	San Diego Film Critics Society	Best Actress	Two Days, One Night	Won	
2014	San Francisco Film Critics Circle	Best Actress	Two Days, One Night	Nominated	
2014	St. Louis Gateway Film Critics Association	Best Actress	Two Days, One Night	Nominated	
2014	Utah Film Critics Association	Best Actress	Two Days, One Night	Runner-up	
2014	Boston Society of Film Critics	Best Actress (Note: shared with Two Days, One Night))	The Immigrant	Won	
2014	Toronto Film Critics Association	Best Actress	The Immigrant	Won	
2014	National Society of Film Critics	Best Actress (Note: shared with her performance in Two Days, One Night))	The Immigrant	Won	
2014	New York Film Critics Circle	Best Actress	The Immigrant	Won	
2022	Paris Film Critics Association Awards	Best Actress	Annette	Nominated	
2024	Paris Film Critics Association Awards	Best Actress	Little Girl Blue	Nominated	

== Honorary awards ==
Organizations	Year	Award	Result	Ref.
AFI Fest	2012	Tribute Award	Honored	
Cannes Film Festival	2004	Trophée Chopard	Honored	
Elle Women in Hollywood Awards	2013	Woman of the Year	Honored	
Gotham Awards	2012	Tribute Award	Honored	
Hasty Pudding Theatricals	2013	Woman of the Year	Honored	
Lumière Awards	2017	Honorary Lumiere Award	Honored	
Order of Arts and Letters of France	2010	Knight of the Orders of Arts and Letters	Honored	
Order of Arts and Letters of France	2016	Officer of the Order of Arts and Letters	Honored	
Order of the Legion of Honour	2016	Knight of the Legion of Honour	Honored	
San Sebastian Film Festival	2021	Donostia Lifetime Achievement Award	Honored	
Santa Barbara International Film Festival	2008	Virtuoso Award	Honored	
Telluride Film Festival	2012	Silver Medallion Award	Honored	
L'Alliance New York	2026	Trophée des Arts	Honored	
