= Marion Cotillard =

French actress (born 1975)

Marion Cotillard OOAL LoH
- Cotillard in 2026
- Born: 30 September 1975 (age 51); Paris, France
- Other name: Simone
- Occupation: Actress
- Years active: 1982–present
- Works: Full list
- Partner: Guillaume Canet (2007‍–‍2025)
- Children: 2
- Awards: Full list

Marion Cotillard (French: [maʁjɔ̃ kɔtijaʁ]; born 30 September 1975) is a French actress who has appeared in both mainstream and independent European and Hollywood productions. She is the recipient of various accolades, including an Academy Award, a British Academy Film Award, two César Awards, and a Golden Globe Award. She became a Knight of the Order of Arts and Letters in France in 2010 and was promoted to Officer in 2016, the same year she was named a Knight of the Legion of Honour.

Cotillard began her career at age six and had her first English-language role in the television series Highlander (1993) at age seventeen, followed by her feature film debut in The Story of a Boy Who Wanted to Be Kissed (1994). Her breakthrough came in the French film Taxi (1998). She made her Hollywood debut in Big Fish (2003) and won the César Award for Best Supporting Actress for A Very Long Engagement (2004). She won the Academy Award for Best Actress for her portrayal of French singer Édith Piaf in La Vie en Rose (2007), becoming the only actor to win an Academy Award for a French-language performance. She earned her second Academy Award nomination for her performance as a factory worker trying to keep her job in Two Days, One Night (2014). She also acted in English-language films such as A Good Year (2006), Public Enemies (2009), Nine (2009), Inception (2010), Contagion (2011), Midnight in Paris (2011), The Dark Knight Rises (2012), The Immigrant (2013), Macbeth (2015), and Annette (2021), and French-language films such as Love Me If You Dare (2003), Little White Lies (2010), Rust and Bone (2012), and Little Girl Blue (2023).

Cotillard's films have grossed over $3.7 billion at the worldwide box-office and sold over 76 million admissions in France. On stage, Cotillard has portrayed Joan of Arc in numerous productions of Joan of Arc at the Stake in several countries. She is also an environmentalist and has served as a spokeswoman for Greenpeace since 2001. She was the face of the Lady Dior handbag from 2008 to 2017, and Chanel No. 5 from 2020 to 2024.

== Early life, family and education ==
Cotillard was born on 30 September 1975 in Paris, France in an artistically inclined household. Her mother, Niseema Theillaud, is an actress and drama teacher. Her father, Jean-Claude Cotillard, is an actor, teacher, former mime (appearing in French in Action), and theatre director, of Breton descent. She was raised in Alfortville, a southern suburb of Paris. The family resided in a flat on the 18th floor of a tower block in a low-income housing complex known as HLM in the Cité des Grands Ensembles. When she was 11 years old, they moved to the small commune of Aulnay-la-Rivière in the Loiret department in north-central France. She has two younger brothers, twins Quentin and Guillaume, a writer and a sculptor. The family later moved to La Beauce, a town near Orléans, where her father set up his own theatre company.

Cotillard's father introduced her to cinema. As a child, she would mimic Louise Brooks and Greta Garbo in her bedroom. She dreamed of being in an American musical and memorized Singin' in the Rain (1952) and Poltergeist (1982) as a kid. She began acting during her childhood, appearing in one of her father's plays. At age three, she appeared on stage for the first time opposite her mother.

At age 15, Cotillard entered the Conservatoire d'art dramatique in Orléans. After graduating in 1994, she moved to Paris to pursue an acting career. In order to pay her bills in her teens, she made keychains at home and sold them at candy stores.

== Career ==
=== 1982–1999: Early roles and breakthrough ===
In 1982, at the age of six, Cotillard made her on-screen debut in the short film Le monde des tout-petits, directed by Claude Cailloux and broadcast by the French TV channel TF1 on 17 May. The following year, she appeared in another short film for TF1, Lucie, also directed by Cailloux. In 1991, she appeared in a TV spot against alcoholism titled "Tu t'es vu quand t'as bu?" ("You've seen yourself when you're drunk?"), launched by the French Committee for Health Education.

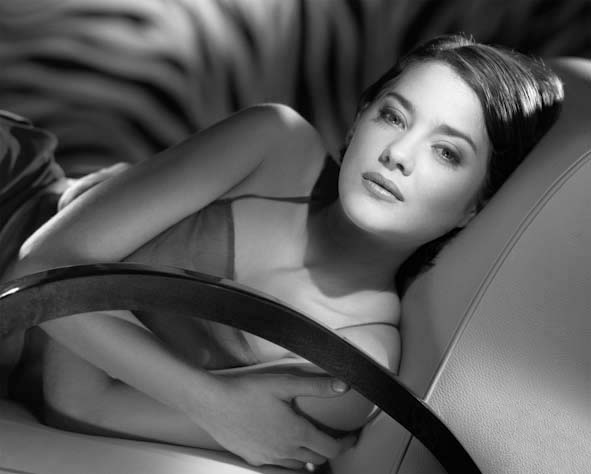
Cotillard in 1999

After small appearances and performances in theatre, Cotillard had occasional, minor roles in television series such as Highlander in 1993, where she had her first English-speaking role aged 17. Her career as a film actress began in the mid-1990s, with minor roles in Philippe Harel's The Story of a Boy Who Wanted to Be Kissed (1994), which was her feature film debut at the age of 18, and in Arnaud Desplechin's My Sex Life... or How I Got into an Argument, and Coline Serreau's La Belle Verte, both released in 1996. Also in 1996, she had her first leading role in the television film Chloé, directed by Dennis Berry and opposite Anna Karina, with Cotillard starring as a teenage runaway who is forced into prostitution.

In 1998, she appeared in Gérard Pirès' action comedy Taxi, playing Lilly Bertineau, the girlfriend of delivery boy Daniel, played by Samy Naceri. The film was a box office hit in France with over six million tickets sold, and Cotillard was nominated for a César Award for Most Promising Actress. She reprised the role in Taxi 2 (2000) and Taxi 3 (2003). In 1999, Cotillard ventured into science fiction with Alexandre Aja's post-apocalyptic romantic drama Furia. That same year, she also starred in Francis Reusser's Swiss war drama film War in the Highlands (La Guerre dans le Haut Pays), for which she won the Best Actress Award at the 1999 Autrans Mountain Film Festival.

In 2001, she appeared in Pierre Grimblat's romantic war drama film Lisa, playing the title role and younger version of Jeanne Moreau's character, alongside Benoît Magimel and Sagamore Stévenin. She also starred in Gilles Paquet-Brenner's drama film Pretty Things (Les Jolies Choses), adapted from the work of feminist writer Virginie Despentes, portraying twins of completely opposite characters, Lucie and Marie, for which she earned a second César Award nomination for Most Promising Actress. In 2002, Cotillard starred in Guillaume Nicloux's thriller A Private Affair (Une Affaire Privée), in which she portrayed the mysterious Clarisse.

=== 2000–2009: Transition to Hollywood and acclaim ===
Cotillard started the transition into Hollywood when she obtained a supporting role in Tim Burton's 2003 fantasy comedy-drama film Big Fish, in which she played Joséphine, the French wife of Billy Crudup's character, William Bloom. The production, her first English-language film, allowed her to work with well-established actors such as Helena Bonham Carter, Albert Finney, Ewan McGregor, Jessica Lange and Allison Lohman. Big Fish was a critical and commercial success, and marked a turn for Cotillard, who was unhappy with her career in France at the time for not getting good roles, and considered taking some time off until she got the role in Big Fish. She next starred in Yann Samuell's 2003 French romantic comedy film Love Me If You Dare (Jeux d'enfants), as Sophie Kowalsky, the daughter of Polish immigrants who lives in France and begins playing a game of dares with her childhood friend, portrayed by Guillaume Canet. The film was a box office hit in France with over 1 million tickets sold.

In 2004, she won the Chopard Trophy of Female Revelation at the Cannes Film Festival, narrated the children's audio book Cinq Contes Musicaux Pour les Petits ("Five Musical Tales For the Little Ones") by Isabelle Aboulker, and had supporting roles in Jean-Pierre Jeunet's A Very Long Engagement (Un Long Dimanche de Fiançailles), as the vengeful prostitute Tina Lombardi, a femme fatale who goes on a killing spree to avenge her lover's death, for which she won a César Award for Best Supporting Actress, and in Lucile Hadžihalilović's mystery thriller Innocence as the ballet teacher Mademoiselle Éva; both films were acclaimed by critics. In 2005, Cotillard starred in six films: Steve Suissa's Cavalcade, Abel Ferrara's Mary, Richard Berry's The Black Box (La Boîte Noire); Rémi Bezançon's Love Is in the Air (Ma vie en l'air), Fabienne Godet's Burnt Out (Sauf le respect que je vous dois), and Stéphan Guérin-Tillié's Edy. In May 2005, Cotillard portrayed Joan of Arc for the first time in the Orléans Symphonic Orchestra's production of Arthur Honegger's oratorio Joan of Arc at the Stake at the Palais des Sports d'Orléans, in Orléans, France. She reprised the role several times when performing the oratorio in different countries in the following years.

In 2006, the actress took on significant roles in four feature films, including Ridley Scott's romantic dramedy A Good Year, in which she had her major English-language role up to that point, Fanny Chenal, a French café owner in a small Provençal town, opposite Russell Crowe as a Londoner who inherits a local property. She played Nadine in the Belgian comedy Dikkenek, alongside Mélanie Laurent, and the role of Nicole in Fair Play. She also played Léna in the satirical coming-of-age film Toi et moi, directed by Julie Lopes-Curval, for which she learned how to play the cello for her role.

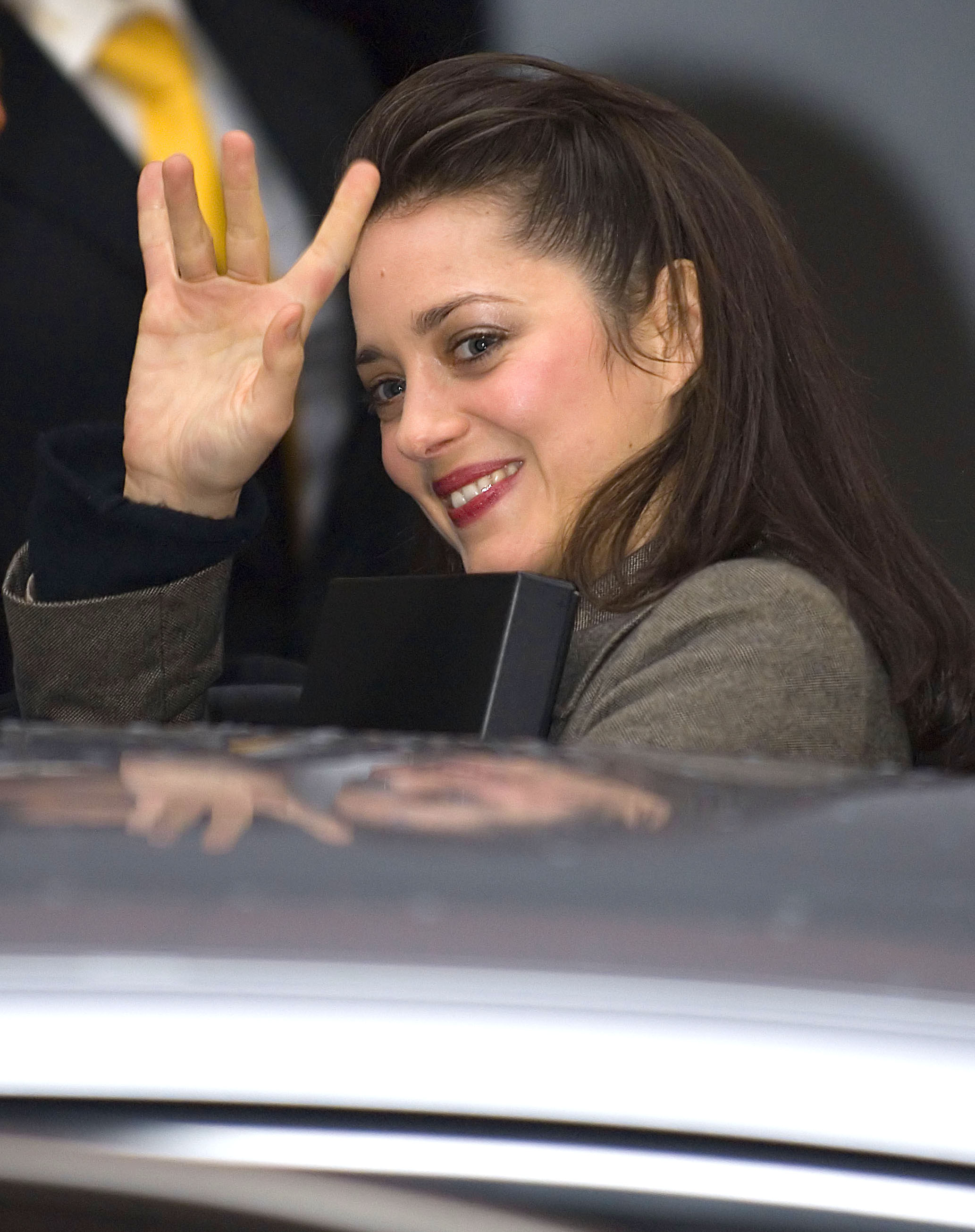
Cotillard attending an event for La Vie en Rose at the 2007 Berlin International Film Festival

Cotillard was chosen by director Olivier Dahan to star as French singer Édith Piaf in his biographical film La Vie en Rose before he had even met the actress, after he noticed a similarity between Piaf's and Cotillard's eyes. It was dubbed "the most awaited film of 2007" in France, where some critics said Cotillard had reincarnated Édith Piaf to sing one last time on stage. During the film's premiere at the 2007 Berlin International Film Festival, Cotillard was in attendance and received a 15-minute standing ovation. Hollywood talent agent Hylda Queally signed Cotillard shortly after the premiere at the festival. La Vie en Rose was a box office hit in France, with more than five million admissions, and made US$86 million worldwide on a US$25 million budget. Cotillard became the first actress to win a Golden Globe for a non-English language performance since 1972 (when Liv Ullmann won for The Emigrants), and also the first person to win a Golden Globe for a (Comedy or Musical) non-English language performance. On 10 February 2008, Cotillard became the first French actress since Stéphane Audran in 1973 to be awarded the BAFTA Award for Best Actress in a Leading Role. At the Academy Awards, she won Best Actress, becoming the first woman and second person (after Adrien Brody in The Pianist six years earlier) to win both a César and an Oscar for the same performance. She is the second French actress to win this award, and the third overall to win an Oscar, after Simone Signoret in 1960 and Juliette Binoche in 1997. She is the first Best Actress Oscar winner for a non-English language performance since Sophia Loren in 1961. She is also the first and (as of 2026) only winner of an Academy Award for a French-language performance. On 23 June 2008, Cotillard was one of 105 individuals invited to join the Academy of Motion Picture Arts and Sciences.

In December 2007, it was announced that Cotillard would play Hedwig in a French production of the musical Hedwig and the Angry Inch, but she gave up on the project because the physical demands of the role were too intense for her, and she was exhausted after filming and promoting La Vie en Rose.

Following her Oscar win, Cotillard continued her Hollywood career and starred alongside Johnny Depp and Christian Bale in the role of Billie Frechette in Michael Mann's Public Enemies, released in the United States on 1 July 2009. Later that year, she appeared in Rob Marshall's film adaptation of Nine, the musical based on the 1963 Federico Fellini film 8½. As Luisa Contini, the wife of Guido (Daniel Day-Lewis), Cotillard performed two musical numbers: "My Husband Makes Movies" and "Take It All". Time magazine ranked her performance in Nine as the fifth best female performance of 2009, behind Mo'Nique, Carey Mulligan, Saoirse Ronan and Meryl Streep. She won the Desert Palm Achievement Actress Award at the 2010 Palm Springs International Film Festival – her second prize from the festival – and was nominated for a Golden Globe for Best Actress in a Motion Picture – Musical or Comedy for her work in Nine. Cotillard appeared on the cover of the November 2009 issue of Vogue with her Nine co-stars, and on the magazine's July 2010 cover by herself.

=== 2010–2019: Established actress ===
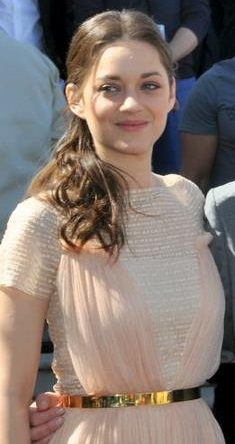
Cotillard in 2012

Cotillard was the Honorary President of the 35th César Awards ceremony, held on 27 February 2010. She played Mal Cobb, a projection of Dom Cobb (Leonardo DiCaprio)'s deceased wife, in Christopher Nolan's film Inception, released on 16 July 2010. Nolan described Mal as "the essence of the femme fatale", and DiCaprio praised Cotillard, saying "she can be strong and vulnerable and hopeful and heartbreaking all in the same moment, which was perfect for all the contradictions of her character." The film made US$825 million in worldwide box-office receipts, and Cotillard and DiCaprio's pairing in Inception ranked eighth on the Forbes list of "Hollywood's Top Earning On-Screen Couples". That same year, she also starred as Marie, an environmentalist, in Guillaume Canet's drama Little White Lies (Les petits mouchoirs).

In 2011, Cotillard co-starred in Woody Allen's Midnight in Paris as Pablo Picasso's fictionalised mistress, Adriana, with whom Owen Wilson's character, Gil, falls in love. The film grossed $151 million worldwide on a $17 million budget. That same year, she also appeared alongside Kate Winslet, Jude Law, Gwyneth Paltrow and Matt Damon in Steven Soderbergh's thriller Contagion.

In 2012, Cotillard portrayed Talia al Ghul (alongside her Public Enemies co-star Christian Bale) in Christopher Nolan's Batman feature The Dark Knight Rises. Cotillard next portrayed an orca trainer who loses her legs after a work accident in Jacques Audiard's romantic drama Rust and Bone (De rouille et d'os), costarring Matthias Schoenaerts. The film premiered in the main competition at the 2012 Cannes Film Festival and received a 10-minute standing ovation at the end of its screening. Cotillard received rave reviews for her performance, and Cate Blanchett wrote an op-ed for Variety describing the film as "simply astonishing" and stating that "Marion has created a character of nobility and candour, seamlessly melding herself into a world we could not have known without her. Her performance is as unexpected and as unsentimental and raw as the film itself." She earned a fifth César Award nomination, a fourth Screen Actors Guild Award nomination, a third Golden Globe nomination (her first for Best Actress – Drama), and her second Critics' Choice Award and Lumière Award nominations. James Kaelan of MovieMaker magazine wrote that it was a travesty that Cotillard was not nominated for an Academy Award for Rust and Bone. Cotillard also received several other honours and career tributes in 2012, at the Telluride Film Festival, Hollywood Film Festival, AFI Fest, Gotham Awards, and Harper's Bazaar Awards.

In 2013, Cotillard appeared with Gary Oldman, her co-star in The Dark Knight Rises, in the controversial music video for "The Next Day" by David Bowie. That same year, she had her first leading role in an American movie in James Gray's The Immigrant as Polish-born nurse Ewa Cybulska, who emigrates hoping to experience the American dream in 1920s New York. Gray wrote the script especially for Cotillard after meeting her at a French restaurant with her then-boyfriend. Cotillard had to learn 20 pages of Polish dialogue for her role, and Gray stated that she is the best actor he's ever worked with. Her performance was widely acclaimed, and she was awarded the New York Film Critics Circle Award, the National Society of Film Critics Award, the Toronto Film Critics Association Award and was nominated for an Independent Spirit Award for Best Actress in 2015. She starred in Guillaume Canet's Blood Ties in 2013 with Clive Owen, Billy Crudup and her Rust and Bone co-star Matthias Schoenaerts; and had a cameo in Adam McKay's comedy film Anchorman 2: The Legend Continues, acting opposite Jim Carrey in the battle scene between rival news teams. In December 2013, Cotillard was a member of the 13th Marrakech Film Festival jury presided by Martin Scorsese.

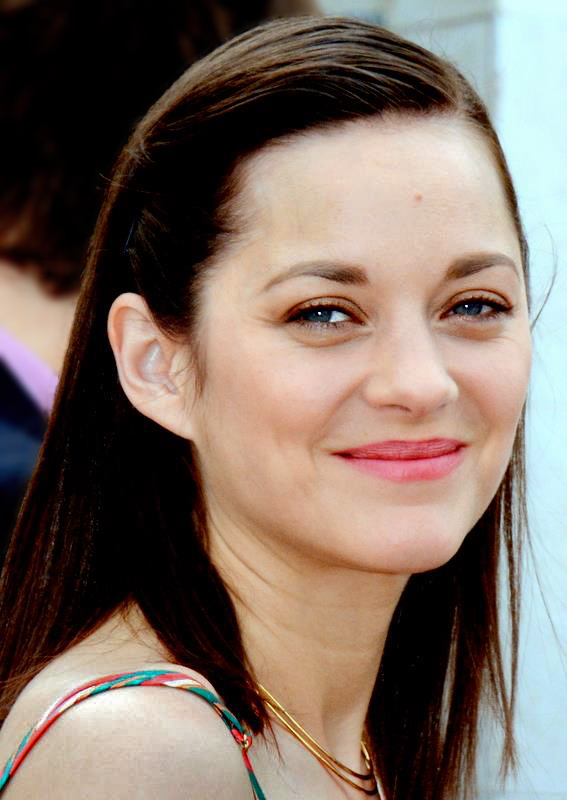
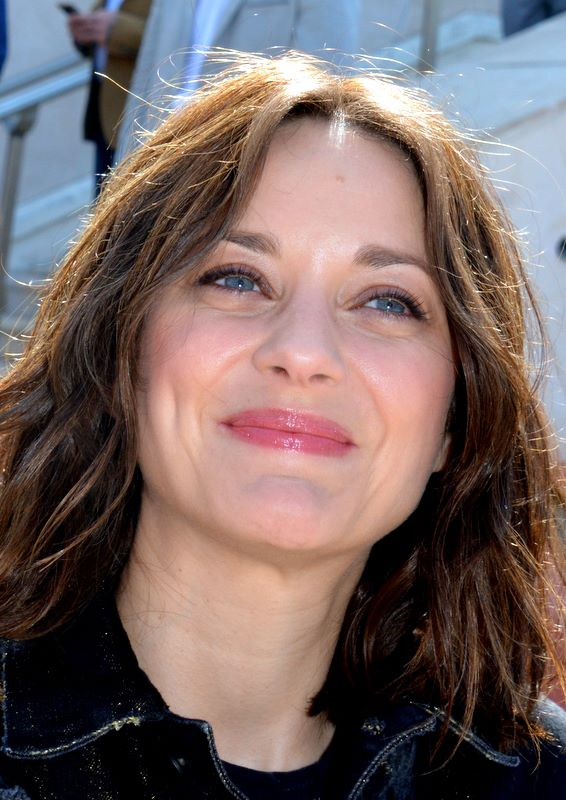
Cotillard at the Cannes Film Festival in 2015 (left) and 2016 (right) for Macbeth and From the Land of the Moon, respectively

In 2014, she starred in the Dardenne brothers drama Two Days, One Night (Deux jours, une nuit), as Sandra, a Belgian factory worker who has just one weekend to convince her co-workers to give up their bonuses so that she can keep her job. The film premiered in the main competition at the 2014 Cannes Film Festival and earned a 15-minute standing ovation, with Cotillard's performance praised as "a career-high performance", and favored to win the festival's Best Actress prize, which ended up going to Julianne Moore for Maps to the Stars. Several critics' awards followed, as well as a European Film Award for Best Actress, a second Academy Award nomination, making Cotillard the first actor to be nominated for a Belgian film, and a sixth César Award nomination. Her performances in both The Immigrant and Two Days, One Night shared the fourth spot on Time's list of Best Movie Performances of 2014. In November 2014, Cotillard participated on Comedy Central's All-Star Non-Denominational Christmas Special, in a duet with Nathan Fielder on the Elvis Presley song "Can't Help Falling in Love".

In 2015, Cotillard took on the role of Lady Macbeth in a film adaptation of William Shakespeare's play, directed by Justin Kurzel and starring Michael Fassbender in the title role. The film premiered at the Cannes Film Festival and Cotillard's performance earned her a nomination for the British Independent Film Award for Best Actress, and high praise from critics, particularly for her "Out, Damned Spot" monologue. Variety critic Guy Lodge remarked: "Her deathless sleepwalking scene, staged in minimalist fashion under a gauze of snowflakes in a bare chapel, is played with tender, desolate exhaustion; it deserves to be viewed as near-definitive." That same year, she starred in the New York Philharmonic's production of Arthur Honegger's oratorio Joan of Arc at the Stake, and voiced the roles of The Rose in both the English and French versions of Mark Osborne's The Little Prince, Scarlet Overkill in the French version of Minions; and April, the title character in the French-Canadian-Belgian 3D animated film April and the Extraordinary World (Avril et le Monde Truqué).

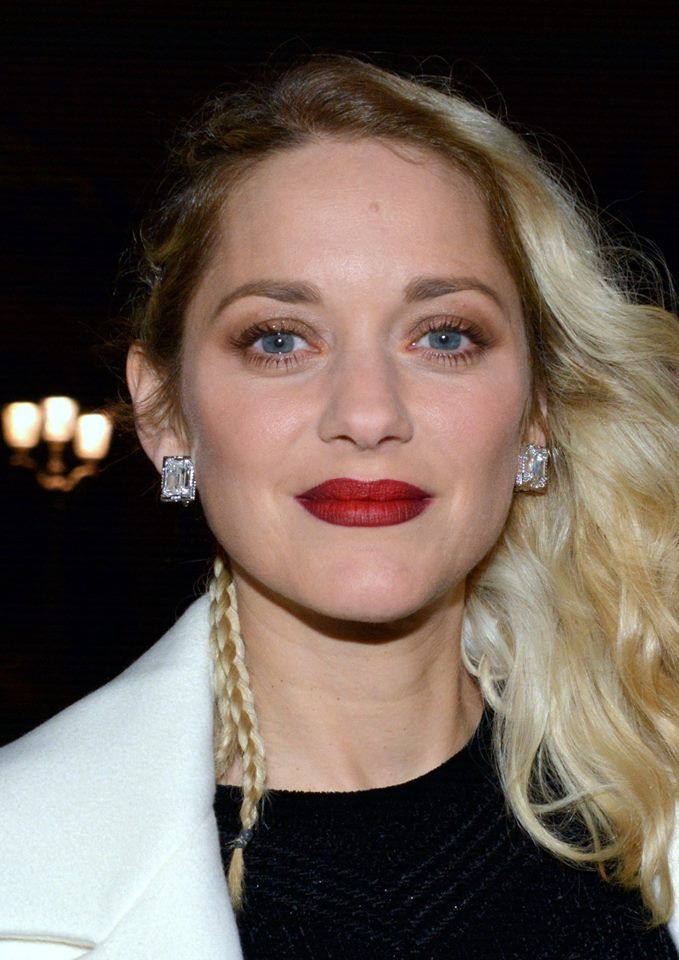
Cotillard in 2018

In 2016, Cotillard played Gabrielle, a free-spirited woman in a convenience marriage in Nicole Garcia's romantic drama From the Land of the Moon (Mal de Pierres), an adaptation of the bestselling Italian novel Mal di Pietre by Milena Agus, which marked her return to French cinema after 2012's Rust and Bone, and earned her a seventh César Award nomination. She also played the role of Catherine, the sister-in-law of a gay playwright (portrayed by Gaspard Ulliel), who returns home to tell his family that he is dying in Xavier Dolan's Canadian-French co-production It's Only the End of the World (Juste la fin du Monde). Both films premiered in main competition at the 2016 Cannes Film Festival, to polarized reactions from critics. It's Only the End of the World was a box office hit in France with over one million tickets sold. Also in 2016, Cotillard starred opposite Brad Pitt in Robert Zemeckis's Allied, a spy film set in World War II in which she played Marianne Beausejour, a French Resistance fighter. While critical reviews were mixed, Stephanie Zacharek of Time magazine wrote that "Pitt and Cotillard give sturdy, coded performances that feel naturalistic, not phony: They understand clearly that their chief mission is to tap the tradition of melodrama, and they take it seriously. Somehow, almost incomprehensibly, it all works. Allied looks old but smells new, and the scent is heady." The film grossed US$120 million worldwide. That same year, Cotillard reteamed with Macbeth director Justin Kurzel and co-star Michael Fassbender in the film adaptation of the video game Assassin's Creed.

On 30 January 2017, Cotillard was honoured with a special award for her career at the 22nd Lumière Awards in France. In 2017, she also starred in Guillaume Canet's satire comedy Rock'n Roll, and in Arnaud Desplechin's drama Ismael's Ghosts (Les Fantomes d'Ismaël), alongside Mathieu Amalric, Charlotte Gainsbourg and Louis Garrel. The Hollywood Reporter, in its review for the former film, asserted that "Cotillard offers up such a sincere performance that you can't help but laugh". In the 2018 drama Angel Face (Gueule d'ange) by director Vanessa Filho, she portrayed Marlene, a woman who suddenly chooses to abandon her daughter for a man she has just met during yet another night of excess. The film premiered in the Un Certain Regard section at the Cannes Film Festival. In 2019, Cotillard was a member of the jury of the Chopard Trophy at the 2019 Cannes Film Festival. That same year, she reprised the role of Marie in Little White Lies 2, sequel to 2010's Little White Lies directed by Guillaume Canet.

=== 2020–present ===
In 2020, Cotillard voiced the fox Tutu in the comedy film Dolittle, directed by Stephen Gaghan. In 2021, she starred as opera singer Ann Defrasnoux alongside Adam Driver in the musical film Annette directed by Leos Carax, which earned her a Golden Globe nomination for Best Actress in a Motion Picture – Musical or Comedy. The songs "So May We Start" and "We Love Each Other So Much", performed by Cotillard and Driver, were released as singles. Cotillard produced the documentary Bigger Than Us, directed by Flore Vasseur, which explores the social movement of young people fighting for change in the 21st century. The documentary was released in France on 22 September 2021 following its world premiere at the 2021 Cannes Film Festival, and it was nominated for a César Award for Best Documentary Film in 2022.

Cotillard voiced German artist Charlotte Salomon in the French version of the animated biographical film Charlotte, directed by Eric Warin and Tahir Rana, which follows the last 10 years of Salomon's life, a Jewish woman who struggled with depression amid World War II and the Holocaust while exiled in the South of France. Cotillard was also an executive producer on the film that made its world premiere at the Toronto International Film Festival in September 2021. In October 2021, Cotillard played the stylist Kim Randall in La Vengeance au Triple Galop, a comedy TV film for France's Canal+, directed by Alex Lutz and Arthur Sanigou.

Cotillard made her third collaboration with director Arnaud Desplechin in the film Brother and Sister (Frère et Sœur), which follows two siblings, Alice and Louis, played by Cotillard and Melvil Poupaud, who are forced to reunite after the death of their parents following two decades of shared silence. The film premiered in the main competition at the 2022 Cannes Film Festival in May 2022. During the 2022 Cannes Film Festival, Cotillard launched alongside filmmaker Cyril Dion and producer Magali Payen her new production company, Newtopia. The company's central aim is to create content around issues such as environmentalism, science, society, health, geopolitics, feminism and gender "that imagine a better future for the world based on ecologically sustainable and socially fair practices". In June 2022, Cotillard played Joan of Arc in the oratorio Joan of Arc at the Stake directed by Juanjo Mena at the Teatro Real in Madrid, Spain. She also voiced Coco Chanel in Rencontre(s), a 15-minute immersive virtual reality project directed by Mathias Chelebourg, which premiered at the 79th Venice Film Festival in September 2022.

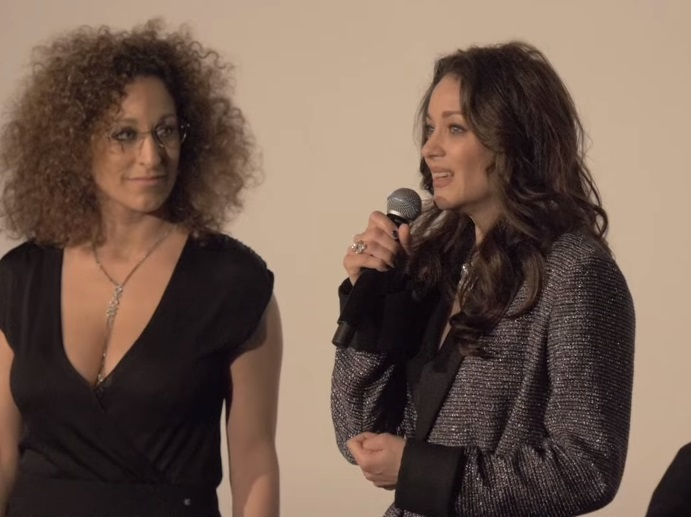
Cotillard and Mona Achache attending an event for Little Girl Blue at the 2023 Cannes Film Festival

In 2023, she appeared in the Apple TV+ climate-change anthology series Extrapolations, and played Cleopatra in Guillaume Canet's adventure comedy film Asterix & Obelix: The Middle Kingdom. She also voiced Louise de Savoy in The Inventor, a stop-motion animated film about the life of Leonardo da Vinci, written and directed by Jim Capobianco, and portrayed Solange d'Ayen, the fashion editor of French Vogue magazine in the World War II biographical drama Lee, directed by Ellen Kuras and starring Kate Winslet as photographer Lee Miller. Cotillard portrayed French writer and photographer Carole Achache in the docudrama Little Girl Blue, directed by Carole's daughter, Mona Achache, which had its world premiere at the 2023 Cannes Film Festival in the Special Screenings section. Cotillard's performance in the film was praised by critics, with Time Out calling her "illuminating"; Libération calling her "impeccable"; and The Hollywood Reporter writing that her performance is "a full-on Method immersion that climaxes with a wrenching breakdown scene that seems to close some kind of gap between the two women." She earned her eight César Award nomination for Best Actress for Little Girl Blue at the 2024 César Awards, becoming the first actress to be nominated for a documentary film. In December 2023, Cotillard was a member of the jury of the Prix André Bazin by French film magazine Cahiers du Cinéma. In May 2024, Cotillard narrated the documentary Olympics! The French Games, directed by Mickaël Gamrasni, which premiered at the 2024 Cannes Film Festival. In June 2024, Cotillard reprised her role as Joan of Arc in the oratorio Joan of Arc at the Stake in Berlin with the Berlin Philharmonic, and in December 2024, she reprised the role in Paris at the Paris Philharmonic Hall.

In 2025, Cotillard starred in Lucile Hadžihalilović's fantasy-drama The Ice Tower, their second collaboration after Innocence (2004), in which she plays an actress who is playing The Snow Queen in a film adaptation of Hans Christian Andersen's fairy tale of the same title. She also voiced Dijon on season 2 of the animated series Sausage Party: Foodtopia, and joined season 4 of the Apple TV+ series The Morning Show playing the role of Celine Dumont, who is described as "a savvy operator from a storied European family".

In 2026, Cotillard will star in Bertrand Mandico's Roma Elastica, in Guillaume Canet's psychological thriller film Karma, and in Nicole Garcia's comedy-drama Milo. In July 2024, it was reported that Cotillard will star in Christopher McQuarrie's World War II film Broadsword. In February 2026, Cotillard started shooting Emmanuelle Bercot's historical drama The Enraged, based on the book of the same name by Sorj Chalandon. In September 2026, Cotillard joined the voice cast of the upcoming animated fantasy film The Turning Door, and was a mentor and tutor for the Biennale College Cinema workshop for emerging filmmakers at the 83rd Venice International Film Festival.

In November 2026, Cotillard will be the president of the jury of the Marrakech Film Festival.

== Acting credits and accolades ==
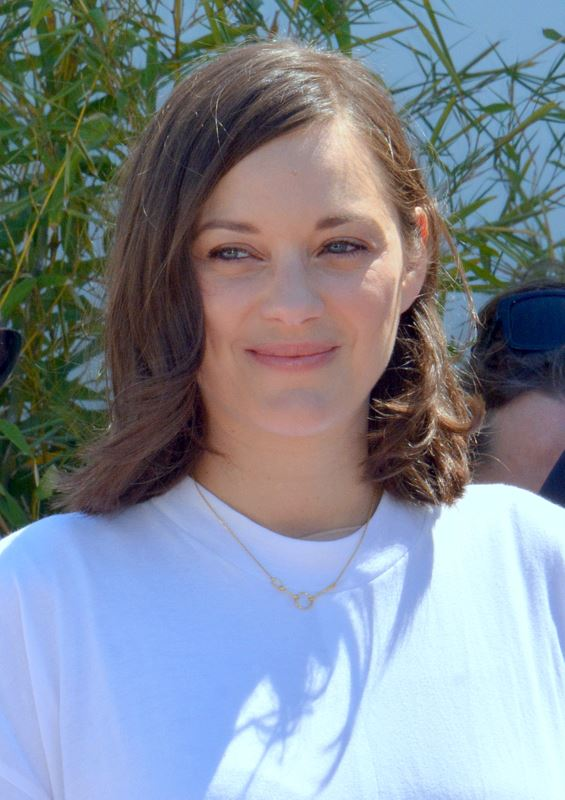
Cotillard at the 2017 Cannes Film Festival

Among other awards, Cotillard has received an Academy Award for Best Actress, a Golden Globe Award, a BAFTA Award, two César Awards, a Lumière Award and a European Film Award. She has also won a New York Film Critics Circle Award, a National Society of Film Critics Award, and a Los Angeles Film Critics Association Award for Best Actress, the critics' awards trifecta. Cotillard, Isabelle Adjani, and Isabelle Huppert are the only French actresses to win the New York Film Critics Circle Award for Best Actress. When she won the Academy Award for Best Actress, she became the first and (as of 2026) only actor to win an Academy Award for a French-language performance, and also the second actress to have won this award for a non-English language performance. Cotillard earned several critics' awards for The Immigrant (2013) and Two Days, One Night (2014), three more Golden Globe nominations for Nine (2009), Rust and Bone (2012), and Annette (2021), and received a second Academy Award nomination for Best Actress for Two Days, One Night in 2015, her second nomination for a French-language film, becoming one of only seven actors to receive multiple Academy Award nominations for non-English language performances.

In March 2010, Cotillard was made a Chevalier (Knight) of the Ordre des Arts et des Lettres (Order of the Arts and Letters) by the French government for her "contribution to the enrichment of French culture". She was promoted to Officier (Officer) on 10 February 2016.

On 14 July 2016, Cotillard received France's highest honour – she was named a Knight of the Legion of Honour. She was among 650 names from the worlds of politics, culture, sport and public life published in the government's official journal for Bastille Day.

On 2 July 2025, it was announced that Cotillard will receive a star on the Hollywood Walk of Fame in 2026 for her contributions to motion pictures.

== Other ventures ==
=== Music ===
Cotillard sings and plays guitar, bass guitar, keyboard and tambourine. She co-wrote and performed the song "La Fille De Joie" for her 2001 film Pretty Things (Les Jolies Choses), in which she played a singer and also performed the song "La Conne" for the film. Canadian singer Hawksley Workman said in interviews about his album Between the Beautifuls that he worked and wrote songs with Cotillard while they both were in Los Angeles during the 2007–2008 movie awards season. In 2008, she co-wrote and performed the song "The Strong Ones" with Hawksley Workman for Olivier Dahan's short film for Cartier's Love range. In 2010, Cotillard recorded the songs "Five Thousand Nights" and "Happy Crowd" with the French Rock band Yodelice for their album "Cardioid". She also went on tour with the band in different cities in France and Belgium, under the pseudonym "Simone", which is her maternal grandmother's name. In the same year, she appeared in the music video "More Than Meets the Eyes" by Yodelice.

Cotillard recorded the song "The Eyes of Mars" with the band Franz Ferdinand especially for Dior. In 2012, she wrote and performed the song "Lily's Body" for the fourth episode of the Lady Dior Web Documentary with the same title, and in 2014, Cotillard wrote and performed the song "Snapshot in LA" alongside John Cameron Mitchell, Metronomy's Joseph Mount and Villaine. She also wrote and co-directed the video for the song, made for Lady Dior's advertising campaign "Enter the Game – Dior Cruise 2015".

On 3 February 2024, Cotillard performed at the benefit concert "Jane Birkin by Friends" in tribute to actress Jane Birkin at the Olympia in Paris, whose profits were donated to French charity Restaurants du Cœur.

=== Endorsements ===
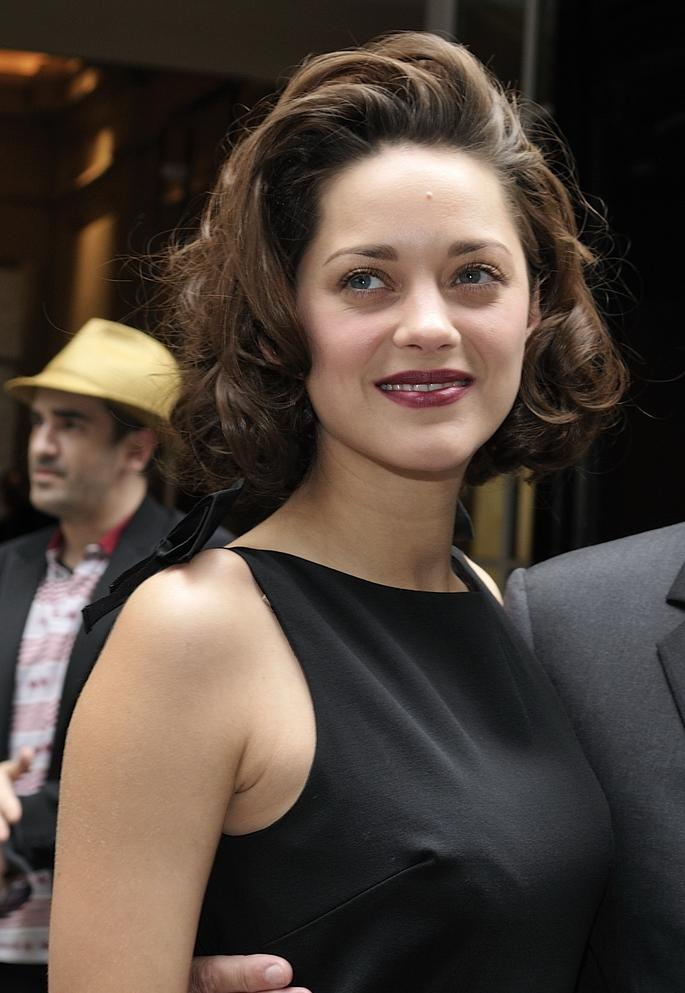
Cotillard at an event for Dior in 2009

In 2008, Cotillard was chosen by British fashion designer John Galliano to be the face of French fashion house Dior's handbag, "Lady Dior", and starred in a series of short films situated in different cities to promote the handbags, portraying the fictional character created by Galliano: Lady Noire Affair (in Paris) directed by Olivier Dahan; Lady Blue Shanghai, directed by David Lynch; Lady Rouge (in New York City), directed by Jonas Akerlund; Lady Grey London, directed by John Cameron Mitchell and co-starring Ian McKellen and Russell Tovey, and L.A.dy Dior (in Los Angeles), also directed by Mitchell. This campaign also resulted in a musical collaboration with Scottish rock band Franz Ferdinand, where Cotillard provided the vocals for a composition performed by the group, entitled "The Eyes of Mars", for the Lady Rouge campaign.

In 2012, Cotillard starred in the web-series Lady Dior Web Documentary and wrote and performed the song "Lily's body" for one episode. That same year, she also designed her own handbag for Dior, the "360° bag". Cotillard also appeared on the cover of the first issue of Dior Magazine in September 2012. In 2014, she wrote and co-directed alongside Eliott Bliss, a music video for her song "Snapshot in LA", especially for Lady Dior's campaign "Enter The Game – Dior Cuise 2015". Cotillard's contract with Dior ended in 2017.

In May 2013, Cotillard became the first actress to walk the red carpet of the Cannes Film Festival wearing the initial models from the Chopard Green Carpet Collection. In 2015, she designed a bracelet for Chopard's Green Carpet Collection made of ethical Fairmined-certified gold. In 2020, Cotillard designed her own sustainable jewelry collection for Chopard entitled "Ice Cube Capsule". She designed seven items curated from Fairmined-certified ethical gold and diamonds. The collection was unveiled on 29 September 2020 during Paris fashion week.

On 17 February 2020, Cotillard was announced as House ambassador and the new face of the Chanel No. 5 fragrance, a position she held until 2024. Her first commercial for Chanel No. 5 was released on 29 October 2020. It was directed by Johan Renck and featured Cotillard dancing in the moon with French ballet dancer Jérémie Bélingard while singing a cover of Lorde's "Team".

== Public image ==
=== In the media ===
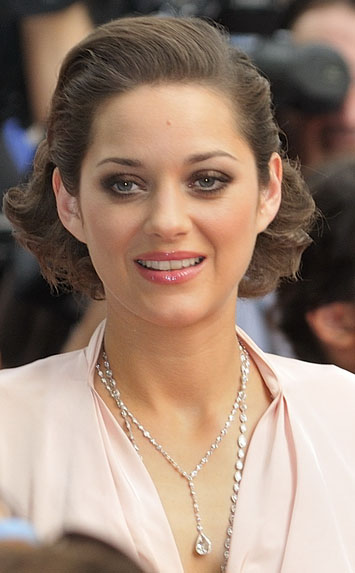
Cotillard in 2009

As of 2026, Cotillard has appeared on more than 300 magazine covers around the world, such as Vogue, Elle, Marie Claire, Variety, Harper's Bazaar, Vanity Fair, Madame Figaro, Glamour, W, Porter, The Hollywood Reporter and Wall Street Journal Magazine. She was the first actress on a Vogue Paris September cover in five years with her September 2010 cover, and was named "Woman of the Decade" by Vogue Paris on their list of the "40 Women of The Decade" in 2010. In August 2012, Cotillard was featured in three major magazine covers: the American Vogue, Vogue Paris and Marie Claire UK. She was also featured on the cover of the first issue of Dior Magazine in September 2012.

David Freeman, screenwriter and author of the book It's All True: A Novel of Hollywood, explained that, for Americans, Cotillard has the charm of the girl next door, "the complete opposite of Catherine Deneuve," he said.

In 2011, Cotillard topped Le Figaro's list of the highest-paid French actors of 2010, the first time in nine years that a female had topped the list. She also tied with Kate Winslet as the highest-paid foreign actress in Hollywood. She was the ninth highest-paid French actress of 2011; the second highest-paid French actress of 2012 and the seventh highest-paid actor overall.

In 2012, Cotillard was named "The World's Sexiest Woman" by the Hungarian magazine Periodika. In 2013, she was ranked No. 13 on Empire Online's list of the "100 Sexiest Movie Stars", was No. 12 on French magazine Slate's list of the "100 Most Influential Women of France", No. 68 on Total Film's list of "Top 200 Performances of All Time" for her performance in La Vie en Rose, and named "Best Dressed Star of 2013" by the British Grazia magazine.

In 2013, Cotillard was named "Woman of the Year" by Harvard's student society Hasty Pudding Theatricals, and named "The Most Beautiful Face of 2013" by The Independent Critics List of the 100 Most Beautiful Famous Faces From Around the World, and ranked as one of the most "Beautiful Famous Faces" for 16 consecutive years. She was ranked No. 47 in 2017, No. 36 in 2016, No. 18 in 2015, No. 14 in 2014, No. 1 in 2013, No. 2 in 2012, No. 7 in 2011, No. 12 in 2010, No. 15 in 2009, No. 4 in 2008, No. 3 in 2007, No. 8 in 2006, No. 17 in 2005, No. 35 in 2004, No. 20 in 2003, and No. 31 in 2002.

She ranked No. 18 on British GQ magazine's list of "The World's 20 Coolest Women" in 2014, and was chosen as one of the 'Best Film Femme Fatales' by Harper's Bazaar in 2014, for her performance as Mal in Inception.

In April 2016, Vox.com analysed the actresses who have starred in the best reviewed films ranked by average Metacritic rating, and Cotillard was No. 3 with an average score of 68. Cotillard ranked second on Google's "Most Searched Actresses of 2016".

In 2017, she was featured on the official poster of the 42nd César Awards in a still from the 2013 film Blood Ties.

The ivory Jean Paul Gaultier gown Cotillard wore at the 80th Academy Awards on 24 February 2008 is regarded as one of the greatest Oscar dresses of all time.

In 2020, Vogue ranked Cotillard number fourteen of "The most beautiful French actresses of all time".

In 2023, she was featured on the official poster of the 48th César Awards in a still from the 2021 film Annette, and also in an animated poster featuring Cotillard singing in the film.

=== In popular culture ===
Cotillard was mentioned in "Trivia", an episode of The Office that aired in January 2012. Her 2001 film Pretty Things (Les Jolies Choses), was the final answer to a trivia contest. Contestant Kevin Malone (portrayed by Brian Baumgartner) answers correctly and wins the contest, crediting Cotillard's multiple nude scenes in the film for his quick recall.

Cotillard has had a look-alike puppet in the French television show Les Guignols de l'info since 2013. In 2014, a sample of Cotillard and Leonardo DiCaprio's dialogue in the train scene from Inception ("You're waiting for a train..."), was featured on the song "Far Away" by nExow at minute 03:28.

In 2015, the French rap band Columbine released a song titled "Marion" after her. During the chorus, they sing "Je t'aime, t'es belle comme Marion Cotillard" ("I love you, you're as pretty as Marion Cotillard", in French).

In the TV Land sitcom Hot in Cleveland (2014; season 5, episode 12: "I Just Met the Man I'm Going to Marry"), Wendie Malick's character is presenting the Oscars nominees for Best Actress in a Supporting Role and declares "Marion Cotill..., you know the French chick who gets nominated for everything."

On 11 April 2015, Cecily Strong debuted her recurring Saturday Night Live impersonation of Cotillard as a respected and dedicated actress debating the place of women in the film industry for the Lincoln Center for the Performing Arts in "Actress Round Table" and "Hollywood Game Night" sketches (Season 40, Episode 18). Other appearances as Cotillard include Season 42, Episodes 1, 8 and 20, as well as Season 43, Episode 3.

== Legacy ==
As of 2026, Cotillard's films have grossed over $3.7 billion at the worldwide box-office and have sold over 76 million admissions in France. She was named "The Most Bankable French Actress of the 21st Century" in 2014 for her films having accumulated more than 37 million ticket sales in France from 2001 to 2014.

As of 2026, Cotillard has had nine films (Note: As of 2026, the official website of the Cannes Film Festival only lists 8 films in main competition for Cotillard, but she was also in the cast of My Sex Life... or How I Got into an Argument, which was in the main competition in 1996. This film is missing from her filmography on the official Cannes' website.) in the main competition and a total of 17 films screened at the Cannes Film Festival. She also had at least one film in official selection for eight consecutive years, from 2011 to 2018.

In 2013, Cotillard's face was one of the inspirations for the design of the Marianne postage stamps in France.

Actresses such as Amy Adams, Carey Mulligan, Emma Stone, Elle Fanning, Jennifer Lawrence, Jessica Chastain, Léa Seydoux, Mia Goth, Noémie Merlant, Rooney Mara, Shailene Woodley, Virginie Efira, and Jessie Buckley have cited Cotillard as an inspiration. Buckley said that she perfected her French accent for the role of Princess Catherine of France in Michael Grandage's 2013 production of William Shakespeare's play, Henry V, by watching Cotillard's films.

When Cate Blanchett was asked who is the best between her and Cotillard (after Blanchett publicly praised Cotillard) at the 2014 Cannes Film Festival, she said: "There is no competition. Marion, hands down. I think she is one of the world's greatest actresses. From the first few frames of La Vie En Rose, I just thought that I'd never seen anything like it. To see her in comic roles, and I was blown away again in Rust and Bone. We share the same agent at CAA, much to my chagrin. I think she's a genius. I can't wait to see her Lady Macbeth."

In 2014, Cotillard was described as "the great silent film actress of our time" by British film critic Robbie Collin from The Daily Telegraph, for her ability to show emotions only with her eyes and facial expressions, although she has never appeared in a silent film.

In 2024, Julianne Moore said that Cotillard deserved to win the 2015 Academy Award for Best Actress for Two Days, One Night (2014) more than she did for Still Alice (2014).

== Personal life ==
Cotillard has described herself as a shy and introverted person who struggles with fame and does not enjoy the glamour and red carpets, preferring to live in France, remaining discreet about her private life and not being constantly on display. Her shyness and being socially uncomfortable as a child led her into acting, which she credited with helping her understand human beings' behavior.

Cotillard speaks French and English fluently. She learned English at age 11. She started learning Spanish at school but later abandoned it. Years later, she began studying Spanish again after watching Lovers of the Arctic Circle (1998) by Julio Medem, which is one of her favorite films. She also started learning Danish because she wanted to work with director Thomas Vinterberg after watching his film The Celebration (1998), but that did not work out.

Cotillard is not religious and has criticized how religions are misused to manipulate people when they are desperate. She has described her beliefs as a "vital energy" rather than a belief in a god or religious dogma, calling it "more earthly than spiritual".

In 1993, at age 17, Cotillard auditioned for a role in Jean-Claude Brisseau's film L'Ange noir (1994) but was not cast. In the early 2000s, Cotillard was among the actresses questioned by investigators about Brisseau's casting practices during the investigation preceding his trial for sexual misconduct, which led to him being convicted of sexual harassment of several actresses in 2005.

In October 2017, Cotillard expressed her support for the victims of film producer Harvey Weinstein after several women accused him of sexual harassment and sexual assault, calling for an end to the "horrifying system" of abuse in the film industry. Cotillard added that more than once in her career she had to dodge predators. Cotillard later said she was never harassed by Weinstein, but every time she worked with him (in Nine (2009), The Immigrant (2013) and Macbeth (2015)), it did not go well and Weinstein would often clash with directors. In a March 2022 interview with Le Monde, Cotillard said that Weinstein tried to prevent The Immigrant from premiering at the Cannes Film Festival and wanted to release it direct-to-TV without a theatrical run, over a dispute with director James Gray.

In a 2026 interview with Madame Figaro, Cotillard said that when she was young, she was sexually assaulted by an actor in a dressing room after they filmed a kissing scene. She added that she always requests an intimacy coordinator on set, even when she trusts the director.

=== Health ===
Cotillard was a vegetarian for twelve years during her youth. However, she had to give up the diet after falling ill due to a protein and vitamin deficiency.

Cotillard suffered panic attacks during her preparation to play the role of Lady Macbeth in Macbeth (2015). She said it was due to being hard to live with such a dark character and finding the right accent. She recognized the symptoms because she had studied it during her research for the film Two Days, One Night (2014), in which she played a woman struggling with depression.

In May 2020, during the COVID-19 pandemic, Cotillard was diagnosed with COVID-19 and experienced mild symptoms.

=== Relationships and family ===
In the late 1990s, Cotillard was in a relationship with French actor Julien Rassam. She had a long-term relationship with French actor Stéphan Guérin-Tillié from 2000 to 2005, with whom she co-starred in the short films Quelques jours de trop (2000) and Heureuse (2001), in the 2001 TV series Les redoutables, and in the 2005 feature films Cavalcade and Edy. She dated French singer Sinclair from 2005 to 2007.

From October 2007 to 2025, Cotillard was in a relationship with French actor and director Guillaume Canet. They had been friends since 1997, and co-starred for the first time years later in the film Love Me If You Dare (2003), followed by The Last Flight (2009), Rock'n Roll (2017), and Asterix & Obelix: The Middle Kingdom (2023); and Canet also directed Cotillard in Little White Lies (2010), Blood Ties (2013), Little White Lies 2 (2019), Asterix & Obelix: The Middle Kingdom (2023), and Karma (2026). They never got married. Though in 2010, Cotillard started wearing a diamond solitaire on her left hand — a present from Canet — they were not engaged either. In 2014, Cotillard denied being married to Canet, referring to him as "my boyfriend" in interviews. In 2011, they had their first child, a son, Marcel, and in 2017, their second child, a daughter, Louise was born. On 27 June 2025, Cotillard and Canet announced their separation in a joint statement to French news agency Agence France-Presse, saying that they made the separation public "to avoid all speculation, rumors and risky interpretations," and that they decided to separate after 18 years together by "mutual agreement" and with "mutual goodwill".

Cotillard lives in Paris with her children. In January 2018, Cotillard told The Hollywood Reporter that with her then six-year-old son entering school and a newborn daughter, she would be slowing down her filming schedule for the time being. In a May 2023 interview with British magazine A Rabbit's Foot, she explained that she slowed down in order to protect her children, as she rarely chooses "lighthearted stories" and her roles were preventing her from living her life fully, citing La Vie en Rose (2007) and Macbeth (2015) as examples of that. "There are two kinds of actresses: those who burn themselves out, and those who manage to put the character aside and come home in the evening. Today, I'm halfway there. Since becoming a mother, I have put boundaries to protect my children", she said. Canet revealed in an interview with Libération in September 2023 that he and Cotillard had a deal to never shoot for long periods or at the same time, so that their children would not be left in the care of a nanny.

=== Political views ===
In 2014, Cotillard was opposed to French right-wing politician Marine Le Pen getting into government. Since then, she has publicly spoken out against Le Pen's politics. In 2016, following the election of US President Donald Trump and the then-upcoming French presidential election in which Le Pen was a candidate, Cotillard called for intellectuals to take a stand to defend freedom of speech, saying: "All the philosophers, thinkers and writers, who question themselves and the world, and who have the freedom of speech and freedom to express themselves, have to do it – for the ones who cannot."

Cotillard supports LGBTQ+ rights, and in 2016, she expressed opposition to the French anti-same-sex marriage movement La Manif pour tous ("Protest for Everyone"). In 2025, she was a guest judge on Drag Race France All Stars.

In October 2021, a book about French President Emmanuel Macron entitled Le traître et le néant (English: The Traitor and the Void) by two journalists from Le Monde, Gérard Davet and Fabrice Lhomme, was published in France. The book claimed that Macron had declared about Cotillard: "She pisses me off, Cotillard", with theater producer Jean-Marc Dumontet cited as eye-witness. This statement was in response to Cotillard's 2018 criticism of Macron's politics, especially environmental ones, when she stated in Le Parisien: "My faith in politics has been really undermined. He's making promises to have a good image and then behind [our backs] not keeping them at all. I find that unbearable." In December 2023, Cotillard criticized Macron over his defense of actor Gérard Depardieu and his refusal to remove Depardieu's Legion of Honor title after he was accused of rape and sexual assault by several women.

In June 2024, Cotillard spoke out against the French far-right party National Rally ahead of the French legislative elections.

=== Philanthropy and activism ===
In addition to her film work, Cotillard is active in philanthropy, environmental and social activism, and has participated in campaigns for environmental protection, in particular Greenpeace, for whom she nearly quit acting to join and has been a member of and acted as a spokesperson since 2001. In the late 1990s, Cotillard refused an advertising contract with L'Oréal due to the company's animal testing practices. In 2003, she volunteered to have her home tested for toxic chemicals as part of the Greenpeace's Vacuum Clean the Chemical Industry campaign. In 2005, she contributed to Dessins pour le climat ("Drawings for the Climate"), a book of drawings published by Greenpeace to raise funds for the group. In 2010, she travelled to Congo with Greenpeace to visit tropical rainforests threatened by logging companies, which was later shown in the documentary The Congolese Rainforests: Living on Borrowed Time, hosted by Cotillard. She is also Greenpeace's Ocean Ambassador, and in 2020 she travelled to the Antarctic aboard the Greenpeace ships Esperanza and Arctic Sunrise along with Swedish actor Gustaf Skarsgård, Chinese actress Ni Ni and penguin scientists as part of an expedition that became a documentary series to highlight the impact of climate change, plastic pollution, and industrial fishing on the region.

Cotillard supports The Heart Fund, an international public charity that is a pioneer in technological innovation to combat cardiovascular diseases in children, and is also a member of World Wide Fund for Nature, and the Nicolas Hulot Foundation, which supports environmental initiatives in France and abroad to engage the ecological transition of societies. Cotillard is also the godmother of Maud Fontenoy Foundation, a non-governmental organization dedicated to teaching children about preserving the oceans; and the ambassador of Association Wayanga, a French association that supports indigenous peoples for their rights and the preservation of their cultures and the Amazon Forest they inhabit.

In 2009, Cotillard was one of many celebrities to record a cover version of the song "Beds are Burning" by Midnight Oil, in support of the TckTckTck campaign and climate justice. In the same year, Cotillard designed her own doll for UNICEF France campaign "Les Frimousses Font Leur Cinéma", that was sold to help vaccinate thousands of children in Darfur. In 2011, she publicly supported Chief Raoni in his fight against the Belo Monte Dam in Brazil and signed his petition.

In 2012, Cotillard was featured on Kate Winslet's book The Golden Hat: Talking Back To Autism, with celebrity self-portraits to raise awareness and support for autism launched by Winslet's Golden Hat Foundation. In 2013, she caged herself near Paris's Louvre museum to demand the freeing of 30 Greenpeace activists jailed in Russia over an Arctic protest. She entered the cage and held a banner proclaiming "I am a climate defender".

In February 2014, she signed The Tiger Manifesto, a campaign calling for an end to everyday products being manufactured through forest destruction. Launched by Greenpeace, the campaign is encouraging consumers to demand products are forest and tiger-friendly, particularly in Indonesia, where the Sumatran tiger is on brink of extinction. In May 2014, Greenpeace released the animated video The Amazon's Silent Crisis, narrated by Cotillard. The video highlights the troubling illegal logging that threatens the Brazilian Amazon.

On 26 February 2015, she went to the Philippines along actress Mélanie Laurent and France's then-President François Hollande to participate on a forum and encourage faster and more determined action on the global challenge of climate change. At the 2015 Cannes Film Festival, director Mark Osborne revealed that Cotillard used to visit Children's Hospitals and play The Rose (from the book The Little Prince) for the kids, years before she voiced the same character in the 2015 film The Little Prince, directed by Osborne.

Cotillard was the ambassador for "1 Heart 1 Tree", an art project that fights climate change through its Plant for the Planet reforestation program. On 29 November 2015, The Eiffel Tower became a virtual forest with trees and words encouraging environmental activism projected onto it every evening. Cotillard and UN Secretary-General Ban Ki-moon inaugurated the light installation on the eve of the official opening of the COP21 conference. She also donated her shoes to be displayed among an installation of over 10,000 shoes at the Place de la Republique in Paris on the eve of the U.N. climate conference (COP21). The installation replaced a giant march for climate change that was forbidden by French authorities following the deadly attacks in the capital on 13 November that killed 130 people.

On 10 December 2015, Cotillard voiced the French version of the short film Home, made by Conservation International (CI). The short film debuted at the United Nations Momentum for Change Awards ceremony at the climate negotiations (COP21) in Paris. It was the latest addition to CI's award-winning Nature Is Speaking short film series, and was produced to remind negotiators and world leaders on how to care for the Earth. "This Earth is our shared home, our only home. The time to safeguard its future – and with it our own future – is right now," said Cotillard.

In 2018, Cotillard signed a letter calling for strong action to stop climate change and biodiversity loss. In 2019, she signed the petition Résister et créer ("Resist and Create"), created by the movement On Est Prêt along with Cyril Dion to challenge the world of cinema at a time of mobilizations for the climate.

Cotillard is a supporter of the French gender equality group Collectif 50/50. On 12 May 2018, Cotillard was one of the 82 women who marched up the stairs to the Cannes Film Festival to protest gender inequality in the film industry.

In November 2019, Cotillard supported French actress Adèle Haenel for speaking out about the sexual abuse she experienced as a child from director Christophe Ruggia.

In March 2020, Cotillard participated on a public service announcement from the Columbia University Mailman School of Public Health to help educate people on COVID-19 and encouraged them to listen to the health experts to avoid spreading the virus.

In October 2022, Cotillard and other French actresses publicly cut locks from their hair in a video shared on social media with the hashtag #HairForFreedom in support of Iranian protesters following the death of Mahsa Amini, who was arrested for allegedly violating the Islamic Republic of Iran's dress code by not wearing the hijab. In December 2022, Cotillard signed an open letter demanding the release of Iranian actress Taraneh Alidoosti, who had been arrested for standing in solidarity with imprisoned Iranian filmmakers who protested against the Iranian regime. Alidoosti was released on bail in January 2023.

In June 2023, Cotillard expressed her "total support" to the French environmental group Les Soulèvements de la Terre ("The Earth Uprisings Collective"), after the group was dissolved by the French government. Cotillard said; "What is happening in our country is extremely serious. Those who warn of the eminently dangerous drift of our world and our humanity, activists who call for government action that lives up to the urgency, are now described as criminals or eco-terrorists. And this while those who continue to invest massively in fossil fuels putting in jeopardy the living conditions on our planet are never worried. The security drift of this government, coupled with its inability to protect us from the consequences of climate change, is frightening. But these intimidations will not be able to silence us. Today, in our country, freedom is in danger."

In November 2023, Cotillard joined more than 500 figures from French cinema in an open letter calling for "a silent march of solidarity, humanism and peace" in Paris in response to the ongoing Israel-Gaza war.

In December 2025, after French First Lady Brigitte Macron made a sexist remark toward feminist activists who were protesting at comedian Ary Abittan's stand-up show that Macron attended (after Abittan was accused of raping a woman in 2021), describing them as "stupid bitches", Cotillard shared a post on Instagram supporting the activists, saying; "I'm a stupid bitch. And proud to be one." The case caused a lot of controversy in France and Macron later apologized.

In January 2026, Cotillard was among the 800 film professionals who signed a statement condemning the Iranian regime for the violence inflicted on Iranian citizens protesting against the government and economic hardship.

=== Stalking incidents ===
In August 2011, Teresa Yuan, a New York City resident, was arrested and charged with stalking Cotillard. Over four days in July 2011, Yuan sent over 500 emails and 120 webcam videos of herself to a fansite dedicated to Cotillard, in which she mentioned wanting to play Russian roulette with Cotillard and stating she would feel no regret after it happened. The FBI became involved after the fansite's administrator alerted them. Yuan was released on a $50,000 bail under the condition that she would undergo a mental health evaluation and stay away from Cotillard. In September 2012, Yuan pleaded guilty to interstate stalking in a Brooklyn federal court. She told the judge she was undergoing psychiatric treatment for bipolar disorder. Yuan continued to search for Cotillard online and engaged in other activities prohibited by the court while she was under pretrial supervision. On 17 May 2013, Yuan was sentenced to five years of supervised probation and mental-health treatment and ordered to stay away from Cotillard.

In January 2025, Cotillard's then-partner, Guillaume Canet, revealed in an interview with Legend that they had to alert authorities after receiving threats from a fan of Cotillard who suffered from erotomania and believed to be in a relationship with her.

== Discography ==
Singles

List of Marion Cotillard music singles
Year	Title(s)	Notes
2001	"L'homme d'amour" (with Jeanne Moreau)	soundtrack of the film Lisa
2001	"La fille de joie" and "La conne"	soundtrack of the film Pretty Things
2002	"Une affaire privée"	soundtrack of the film A Private Affair
2005	"It Had to Be You"	soundtrack of the film Edy
2008	"The Strong Ones" (with Hawksley Workman)	for LOVE by Cartier campaign
2009	"Beds Are Burning"	for the project TckTckTck – Time for Climate Justice
2009	"My Husband Makes Movies"; "Take It All"	soundtrack of the film Nine
2010	"Five Thousand Nights"; "Happy Crowd" (with Yodelice)	on the album Cardioid by Yodelice
2010	"The Eyes of Mars" (with Franz Ferdinand)	for Lady Dior campaign
2012	"Lily's Body"	for Lady Dior campaign
2014	"Snapshot in LA"	for Lady Dior campaign
2021	"So May We Start"; "We Love Each Other So Much" (with Adam Driver)	soundtrack of the film Annette

== See also ==
- List of Academy Award winners and nominees from France
- List of actors nominated for Academy Awards for non-English performances
- List of actors with more than one Academy Award nomination in the acting categories
- List of Golden Globe winners
