= From the Land of the Moon =

2006 Italian novella

- First edition (Italian)
- Author: Milena Agus
- Original title: Mal di Pietre
- Translator: Ann Goldstein
- Cover artist: Leonardo Cremonini
- Language: Italian
- Genre: History
- Publisher: Europa Editions (English)
- Publication date: 2006
- Publication place: Italy
- English publication date: January 2011
- Media type: Print (paperback
- Pages: 108
- ISBN: 978-1-60945-001-4

From the Land of the Moon (Italian: Mal di Pietre) is a 2006 novella by the Italian writer Milena Agus. It was translated into English in 2010 by Ann Goldstein. Agus asked that the passages of her work that were written in Sardinian be kept, a wish that was respected.

The novella was adapted as a French film, Mal de pierres (2016), released with subtitles in English as From the Land of the Moon, written and directed by Nicole Garcia and starring Marion Cotillard.

== Plot ==
A young woman recounts her grandmother's past life in Italy, beginning in 1943 in the middle of the Second World War, when her grandmother had reached her 30s and was still unwed. Considered an old maid by her parents, the she was married off to a man who had come to the town after his home had been bombed. She told him she would not have a sexual relationship with him, and he agreed as long as she permitted him to go to brothels. Shortly afterward, the couple moved to the man's home in Cagliari.

The woman began to have sex with her husband in order to save the money he would have spent on brothels, but they were unable to conceive a child. She had painful kidney stones, which resulted in several miscarriages. After several years, in 1950 the woman's doctor recommended that she go to Civitavecchia for thermal treatments at a well-known spa. While there, the married woman met a war veteran, and they bonded over their artistic passions, his for music and hers for writing. He had lost a leg in the war, was married, and lived in Milan with his wife and child.

Nine months later, the formerly childless married woman had a son. When he is seven, she goes to work as a maid so that he can have piano lessons. The son takes after his father and grows up to be a classical pianist. He in turn marries and has a daughter. The daughter and her grandmother become close; the older woman eventually tells her granddaughter about her affair with the veteran so many years ago.

The grandmother also confides that in 1963 she, her husband and son visited Milan to see her younger sister. The grandmother somehow thought she would encounter her former lover and leave with him. Instead, she was overwhelmed by the city and had a miserable time, although the rest of the family remember the trip as one of the best of their lives. After the trip to Milan the woman resigns herself to life with her husband. Sometime later, she dies of kidney failure.

The granddaughter comes to believe that her real grandfather is the veteran. After her grandmother's death, the granddaughter learns that at one point her great-grandparents wanted to commit their daughter to an asylum. She had been cutting herself and wrote erotic poetry (which they considered obscene) to any attractive man who caught her eye.

The granddaughter becomes engaged to a man and the two begin to renovate her family apartment. They discover a notebook hidden in a wall. It belonged to the grandmother and includes a letter from the veteran. It reveals that the account of a sexually charged relationship between the grandmother and the veteran was entirely fictional; she sent him that story sometime after they had parted to ask his opinion. He responded that passages were beautiful, nearly causing him to regret that they never did make love. He encouraged the woman in her writing and reassured her that she was not mad.

== Adaptations ==
In 2014 it was announced that Nicole Garcia would adapt the book for the screen with Marion Cotillard in the lead role. The film premiered at the 2016 Cannes Film Festival.

== Reception ==
The novella was positively reviewed. The New Yorker called it a "spare, fable-like novella".
