= Axelle Renoir =

French singer and composer from Brittany (born 1969)

- Born: 2 February 1969 (age 56)
- Origin: Josselin or Redon, France
- Occupation(s): Singer, composer
- Years active: 1994–present

Axelle Renoir (born Fabienne Meignen; 2 February 1969) is a French singer and composer from Brittany. She has released three studio albums and composed the soundtrack of two French films.

== Life and career ==
Axelle Renoir was born in 1969 in Josselin or in Redon. As a teenager, she studied at the Conservatoire de Rennes for three years. She entered a competition organized by the television channel M6 and won the first prize of the new Talents M6.

She then signed her first album with Warner in 1995, Magnum et matinées dansantes, which she composed all the music but wrote few of the lyrics. "Lulu" was released in 1994 as a single from this album. The album sold 30,000 copies. That same year, she performed a duet on the radio with Nicola Sirkis's group Indochina, "Dieu est un fumeur de Havane" (a revival of Deneuve and Gainsbourg).

A second single appeared, "La cour des Grandes", which was followed by "Silence, je me retourne." A tour was organized through France via Paris, and in 1996 she was nominated for Victoires de la Musique as Newcomer of the Year, but Stephend won the prize.

Two years later, in 1998, she released her second album, Rose for which she composed the music and wrote many of the lyrics. Renoir was accompanied by the author Sylvie Bonnet. The album included some lyrics by Janco. Three singles were released: "Sous les shorts des Garçons", "Treize juillet sous la Lune", and "Les filles de l'air".

In 1999, she initiated and participated in Ensemble contre le Sida (the drive against AIDS). She composed "Les invités," which she sang in duet with Alain Souchon.

In 2000, she made an "electronic symphony" for the Spectacle de l'an 2000 à Nîmes, which was created by Enki Bilal and Stéphane Plassier, dedicated for the beginning of the year 2000.

She composed songs for the 2001 film Pretty Things and appears for ten minutes in the film, in the role of a critic. The release sold 55,000 copies.

The following year, she composed the music for Oliver Marshall's film, Gangsters and the song "Partir".

In May 2003, she released her third studio album, called La Plage. A single was released, "Je serai là pour toi", a pop/rock song, which sold less than 10,000 copies. She performed in concert at the European (Paris) on 13 May, and is the first part of concerts Etienne Daho and Luz Casal. On the album, she sings "Sous les shorts des garçons" with Alain Souchon in a new pop version, which was released as a single. Marion Cotillard provides backing vocals for the song "Partir". One more single was released from this album, "Amoureuse".

In 2004, she composed the soundtrack of Oliver Marshall 36 quai des orfèvres.

In 2005, she produced and co-produced the album Luka.

In 2007, with Nicolas Hulot, she composed and released the album Ushuaia Nature about the preservation of nature.

In 2009, she realised Thierry Amiel's covers of Sarah Mac Lachlan songs.

She has also composed for television shows, for example, Captain café, Le Destin de lisa, Les coulisses de l'économie, etc.

== Discography ==
=== Studio albums ===
- 1994 – Magnum et matinées dansantes
- 1998 – Rose
- 2003 – La Plage

=== Singles ===
- 1994 – Lulu
- 1995 – La Cour des Grandes
- 1996 – Silence, je me retourne
- 1998 – Sous les shorts des garçons
- 1998 – Les filles de l'air
- 1998 – Treize juillet sous la Lune
- 2001 – Les Jolies Choses
- 2002 – Partir
- 2003 – Je serai là pour toi
- 2003 – Amoureuse
- 2004 – Sous les Shorts des garçons (avec Alain Souchon)

=== Other records ===
- 1995 – Garden party
- 1999 – Ensemble contre le Sida
- 2001 – Soundtrack: Les Jolies Choses
- 2002 – Soundtrack: Gangsters
- 2007 – Ushuaïa Nature

== Other information ==
Axel has composed music for Lauren Faure, Tout plutôt qu'un jour, and Elisa Tovati, S'il n'en reste qu'un.

She has also written lyrics for Luka and for the second album by Thierry Amiel.
