= Milena Agus =

Italian author from Sardinia

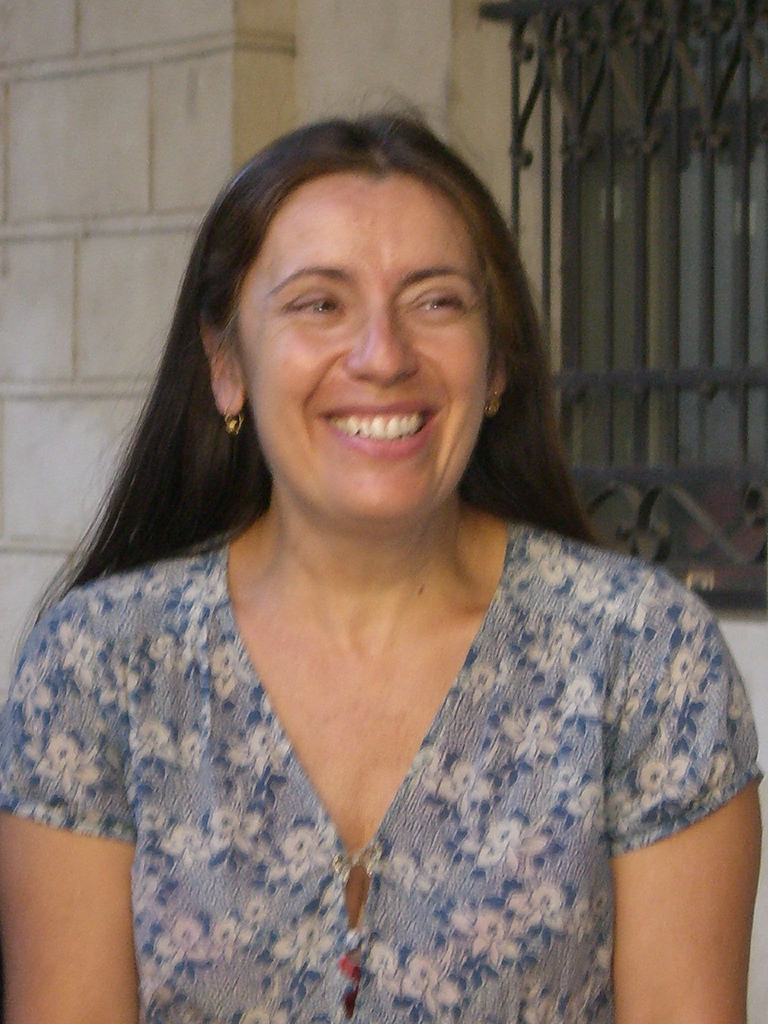
- Born: 1959 (age 66–67); Genoa, Italy
- Occupation: Novelist

Milena Agus (born 1959) is an Italian author from Sardinia. She is one of the leading novelists in the so-called Sardinian Literary Spring which began in the 1980s and which includes other international names such as Michela Murgia.

== Biography ==
Milena Agus was born in Genoa to Sardinian parents. She lives and works in Cagliari, where she teaches Italian and History at the Liceo Artistico e Musicale "Foiso Fois" in Cagliari, a creative school. She is a practitioner of the 'New Sardinian Literature'.

Her first novel, While the Shark is Sleeping (Nottetempo, 2005) had two reprints within as many months, but it was Mal di Pietre (From the Land of the Moon in English) which brought her to the attention of a wide audience. Translated into five languages, it was a bestseller in France, where it rose to international fame. Mal di Pietre was a finalist for the Strega Prize, the Campiello Prize, and the Stresa di Narrativa prize. In 2016 it was adapted into a feature film called Mal de Pierres, or in English From the Land of the Moon directed by Nicole Garcia and starring Marion Cotillard. It was entered into competition at the Cannes Film Festival in May 2016.

== Works ==
- While the Shark is Sleeping, Rome, Nottetempo, 2005
- From the Land of the Moon, Rome, Nottetempo, 2006
- Perché scrivere, Rome, Nottetempo, 2007
- Scrivere è una tana. La Sardegna pure, in AA. VV. (Edited by Giulio Angioni), Cartas de logu: scrittori sardi allo specchio, Cagliari, CUEC, 2007
- The Neighbour, Cagliari, Tiligù, 2008
- Ali di Babbo, Roma, Nottetempo, 2008
- La Contessa di Ricotta, Roma, Nottetempo, 2009
- Nascosto al giorno. Il piacere di leggere e di scrivere, (con Ettore Cannas), Cagliari, Tiligù, 2010
- Sottosopra, Rome, Nottetempo, 2011
- Guardati dalla mia Fame (with Luciana Castellina), Nottetempo, 2014
- Terre promesse, Nottetempo, 2017
- Un tempo gentile, Nottetempo, 2020

=== Works in English ===
- The house in via Manno Carlton North, Vic. : Scribe Publications, 2009. ISBN 9781921372872
- Daddy's wings translator Brigid Maher, Melbourne : Scribe, 2011. ISBN 9781921640384
- While the shark is sleeping, translator Brigid Maher, Publisher: London : Telegram, 2014. ISBN 9781846591860

== Prizes ==
- Junturus Prize 2004, for Mal di Pietre
- Relay Prize («roman d'évasion») in France
- Forte Village Prize 2007
- Campiello Prize, Jury's special selection 2007
- Santa Marinella Peize 2007
- Elsa Morante Prize 2007
- Zerilli-Marimo Prize for Italian Fiction, New York 2008, for Mal di Pietre
