= A Private Affair (2002 film) =

- Theatrical release poster
- French: Une affaire privée
- Directed by: Guillaume Nicloux
- Written by: Guillaume Nicloux
- Produced by: Frédéric Bourboulon
- Starring: Thierry Lhermitte; Marion Cotillard; Lydia Andrei; Jeanne Balibar; Aurore Clément; Garance Clavel; Niels Arestrup; Clovis Cornillac; Frédéric Diefenthal; Robert Hirsch; Philippe Nahon; Samuel Le Bihan
- Cinematography: Olivier Cocaul
- Edited by: Guy Lecorne
- Music by: Éric Demarsan
- Production companies: Little Bear; TF1 Films Production; BAC Films; Canal+; Cofimages 12
- Distributed by: BAC Films
- Release dates: 13 April 2002 (Festival du Film Policier de Cognac); 30 April 2002 (France)
- Running time: 107 minutes
- Country: France
- Language: French
- Budget: $4.6 million
- Box office: $2.2 million

A Private Affair (French: Une affaire privée) is a 2002 French crime mystery thriller film written and directed by Guillaume Nicloux. The film premiered at the Festival du Film Policier de Cognac on 13 April 2002 and was released theatrically in France on 30 April 2002.

== Plot ==
François Manéri is a private detective in charge of the whereabouts of a young missing woman, Rachel Siprien. Six months have passed since the disappearance. At the request of the mother of the latter, François took over the business. The multifaceted personality of the young woman draws a complex web between her best friend, Clarisse, her ex-boyfriend, her stepfather, neighbours and those who knew her from near and afar.

== Cast ==
- Thierry Lhermitte as François Manéri
- Marion Cotillard as Clarisse Entoven
- Samuel Le Bihan as Vincent Walt
- Aurore Clément as Madame Siprien
- Niels Arestrup as Monsieur Siprien
- Jeanne Balibar as Sylvie
- Clovis Cornillac as Freddy
- Philippe Nahon as Mathieu
- Bruno Todeschini as Franck Tanner
- Philippe Morier-Genoud as Henri Dalvec
- Louis-Do de Lencquesaing as Philippe
- Yves Verhoeven as Monsieur Pujol
- Carlo Brandt as Inspector Rossen
- Gérald Thomassin as Inspector Bonnis
- Garance Clavel as Sandrine Pujol
- Consuelo De Haviland as Claudine Després
- Lydia Andrei as Marion
- Marie-Armelle Deguy as Nadège
- Françoise Sage as Martine
- Laurent Grévill as Josselin
- Marc Rioufol as Gilles
- Mathieu Genet as Frédéric
- Sacha Dougnac as Paul
- Frédéric Diefenthal as the transvestite
- Robert Hirsch as the old man
- Jean-Pierre Darroussin as Apolus man
