= Game of dares =

Party game

A game of dares (or simply dare) is a game in which people dare each other to perform actions that they would not normally do. It is commonly played by children.

== Gameplay ==
The game is played by two or more players. A player asks another to do something that one would not normally do or even think of doing themselves. The request may come in the form of "I dare you to..." or "Can you ...?". In order to stay in the game, one must perform the task they are dared to do. If a player refuses to do the challenge or fails to complete it, they lose and are out of the game. Often, losers are given nicknames like "loser" or "chicken".

If the initial dare is declined, it is common to escalate to more elaborate variations, such as "double dare", "double dog dare", "triple dare", or "triple dog dare". "Double dog dare" originated from "double black dog dare" in the mid or late 1800s in England; "black dog" was slang for a bad shilling.

== Risks ==
The game may involve dangerous or unhealthy tasks. Yet, according to social worker Jennifer Moore-Mallinos, "very few children will back on the challenge no matter what the potential risks may be. Attempting the task is[, for them,] the only option." She adds that "although many of these dares begin with harmless requests, over time [they] have the tendency to develop into more serious demands."

== In popular culture ==
Games of dare are depicted in fiction. In the movie A Christmas Story (1983), set in 1940 America, a scene portraying escalating dares results in negative outcomes. The game is portrayed in the English children's novel The Dare Game, the second episode of the first series of the TV adaptation of The Story of Tracy Beaker, and in the French film Love Me If You Dare.

Dare is also a common format for game shows. For example, the long running Nickelodeon franchise Double Dare added a scoring system and other penalties to the basic rules of dare.

== Similar games ==
A variant of this game is called "follow the leader", in which children closely follow the one who is "the leader" and mimic all of their actions. Therefore, in that game the person who comes up with the dares does them first themselves.

== See also ==
- Chicken
- Game of chance
- Game of skill
- Internet challenge
- Parlour game
- Truth or dare?
