= Chloé (1996 film) =

1996 French-Belgian TV drama film directed by Dennis Berry

- Film poster
- Screenplay by: Dennis Berry; Christine Miller
- Directed by: Dennis Berry
- Starring: Marion Cotillard; Anna Karina
- Music by: Stéphane Vilar
- Country of origin: France; Belgium
- Original language: French

Production
- Producers: Hélène Vager; Franck Vager
- Editor: Arnaud Petit
- Running time: 105 min
- Production companies: France 2 (FR2); Le Bureau; Iris Films; L.C.J. Editions & Productions

Original release
- Network: France 2
- Release: 11 June 1996

Chloé is a 1996 French-Belgian TV drama film directed by Dennis Berry starring Marion Cotillard in the title role–her first leading role, a 16-year-old girl who is forced by her boyfriend to become a prostitute. The cast also includes Anna Karina.

The film features Édith Piaf's song "La Vie en Rose" performed by Louis Armstrong. Years later, Marion Cotillard won an Academy Award for Best Actress for playing Piaf in the 2007 film La Vie en Rose.

== Cast ==
- Marion Cotillard as Chloé
- Anna Karina as Katia
- Jean-Claude Adelin as Jean-Michel
- Nozha Khouadra as Elsa
- Arache Mansour as Ahmed
- Elisabeth von Buxhoeveden as Juliette
- Caroline Pevée as Séverine
- Olivier Polgen as Thomas
- Jean-Marie Gelon as Le PDG
- Anne Deleuze as La mère
