= Trophée Chopard =

- Awarded for: Rewards the talent of a young actor and actress
- Location: Cannes Film Festival
- Country: France
- Presented by: Chopard; Variety
- First award: 2001

Trophée Chopard (English: "Chopard Trophy") is awarded by a jury of professionals to two young actors in order to recognize and encourage their career. It was founded in 2001 by Chopard and has since been presented every year during the Cannes Film Festival. An award trophy in the form of a gold-plated film strip is presented to the honorees.

== Winners ==
Year	Male Revelation of the Year	Female Revelation of the Year	Ref.
2001	Eduardo Noriega (Spain)	Audrey Tautou (France)	
2002	Hayden Christensen (Canada)	Ludivine Sagnier (France); Paz Vega (Spain)	
2003	Gael García Bernal (Mexico)	Diane Kruger (Germany)	
2004	Rodrigo Santoro (Brazil)	Marion Cotillard (France)	
2005	Jonathan Rhys Meyers (Ireland)	Kelly Reilly (UK)	
2006	Kevin Zegers (Canada)	Jasmine Trinca (Italy)	
2007	James McAvoy (UK); Nick Cannon (United States)	Archie Panjabi (UK)	
2008	Omar Metwally (United States)	Tang Wei (China)	
2009	David Kross (Germany)	Léa Seydoux (France)	
2010	Edward Hogg (UK)	Liya Kebede (Ethiopia)	
2011	Niels Schneider (France, Canada)	Àstrid Bergès-Frisbey (France, Spain)	
2012	Ezra Miller (United States)	Shailene Woodley (United States)	
2013	Jeremy Irvine (UK)	Blanca Suárez (Spain)	
2014	Logan Lerman (United States)	Adèle Exarchopoulos (France)	
2015	Jack O'Connell (UK)	Lola Kirke (UK, United States)	
2016	John Boyega (UK)	Bel Powley (UK)	
2017	George MacKay (UK)	Anya Taylor-Joy (United States, UK, Argentina)	
2018	Joe Alwyn (UK)	Elizabeth Debicki (Australia)	
2019	François Civil (France)	Florence Pugh (UK)	
2021	Kingsley Ben-Adir (UK)	Jessie Buckley (Ireland)	
2022	Jack Lowden (UK)	Sheila Atim (UK)	
2023	Daryl McCormack (Ireland)	Naomi Ackie (UK)	
2024	Mike Faist (United States)	Sophie Wilde (Australia)	
2025	Finn Bennett (UK)	Marie Colomb (France)	
2026	Connor Swindells (UK)	Odessa A'zion (United States)	

== Presenters ==
Year	Presenter
2001	Emmanuelle Béart (France)
2002	Gong Li (China)
2003	Isabelle Adjani (France)
2004	Laura Morante (Italy)
2005	Sharon Stone (United States)
2006	Elton John and Elizabeth Hurley (UK)
2007	Jude Law (UK)
2008	Gwyneth Paltrow (United States)
2009	Marion Cotillard (France)
2010	Helen Mirren (UK)
2011	Robert De Niro (United States)
2012	Sean Penn (United States)
2013	Colin Firth (UK)
2014	Cate Blanchett (Australia, United States)
2015	Julianne Moore (United States, UK)
2016	Juliette Binoche (France)
2017	Charlize Theron (South Africa, United States)
2018	Diane Kruger (Germany)
2019	Zhang Ziyi (China)
2021	Jessica Chastain (United States)
2022	Julia Roberts (United States)
2023	Natalie Portman (Israel, United States)
2024	Demi Moore (United States)
2025	Angelina Jolie (United States)
2026	Isabelle Huppert (France)
