= The Story of a Boy Who Wanted to Be Kissed =

- French: L'Histoire du garçon qui voulait qu'on l'embrasse
- Directed by: Philippe Harel
- Screenplay by: Philippe Harel; Dodine Herry
- Produced by: Philippe Martin; Gérard Louvin
- Starring: Julien Collet; Marion Cotillard
- Cinematography: Olivier Raffet
- Edited by: Bénédicte Teiger
- Music by: Philippe Eidel
- Production companies: Les Films Pelléas; Glem Film; France 3 Cinéma
- Distributed by: MKL Distribution
- Release date: March 23, 1994 (France)
- Running time: 95 min
- Country: France
- Language: French

The Story of a Boy Who Wanted to Be Kissed (French: L'Histoire du garçon qui voulait qu'on l'embrasse) is a 1994 French romantic drama film directed by Philippe Harel starring Julien Collet and Marion Cotillard in her film debut.

== Plot ==
Raoul is a 20-year-old student in Paris, but girls are not interested in him, although he is good-looking. Raoul is not looking for a great passion, he only wants to be kissed.

== Cast ==
- Julien Collet as Raoul
- Marion Cotillard as Mathilde
- Hélène Médigue as Isabelle
- Marie Pailhes as Virginie
- Sébastien Tavel as Jean-Denis
- Jean Lescot as Raoul's father
- Marie-Claude Mestral as Raoul's mother
- Marie-Christine Laurent as Cathy
- Philippe Morier-Genoud as Mr. Clarke
