= Dennis Berry (director) =

American-French film director, actor, and screenwriter (1944–2021)

- Born: Dennis Charles Berry; August 11, 1944; Hollywood, California, U.S.
- Died: June 12, 2021 (aged 76); Paris, France
- Occupations: Film director, actor, screenwriter
- Years active: 1967–2021
- Spouses: Jean Seberg (m. 1972; died 1979) Anna Karina (m. 1982; died 2019)
- Father: John Berry

Dennis Charles Berry (August 11, 1944 – June 12, 2021) was an American-French film director, actor, and screenwriter. He was the son of director John Berry and married actresses Jean Seberg, from whom he separated before her death in 1979, and Anna Karina, who died in 2019.

== Filmography ==
- Lucky Jo (1964) - Jeune en triporteur (uncredited)
- La Collectionneuse (1967) - Charlie
- Five Ashore in Singapore (1967) - Lt. Dan
- La fille d'en face (1968) - Danek
- Spirits of the Dead (1968) - A Courtier (segment "Metzengerstein") (uncredited)
- À tout casser (1968) - Ange
- L'Amour fou (1969) - Dennis / Pylade
- Paulina Is Leaving (1969) - Olivier
- Paris n'existe pas (1969) - Le beatnick
- Borsalino (1970) - Nono
- Promise at Dawn (1970) - Belle Gueule
- Caméléons (1971) - Jean-Marc
- The Big Delirium (1975, director)
- Ave Maria (1984)
- Last Song (1987, director)
- Chloé (1996, director)
- Stargate SG-1 (1997, director)
- Highlander: The Raven (1998, director)
- Adventure Inc. (2003, TV Series, director)
- Mata Hari (2016, TV Series, director)
