= Lisa (2001 film) =

2001 film by Pierre Grimblat

- Theatrical release poster
- Directed by: Pierre Grimblat
- Screenplay by: Didier Cohen; Pierre Grimblat; Gérard Mordillat
- Based on: Théâtre dans la nuit by Patrick Cauvin
- Produced by: Jean-Luc Azoulay; Paul Giovanni; Pierre Grimblat; Marie-Astrid Lamboray
- Starring: Jeanne Moreau; Marion Cotillard; Benoît Magimel; Sagamore Stévenin
- Cinematography: Walther Vanden Ende
- Edited by: Marie-Sophie Dubus
- Music by: Gabriel Yared
- Production companies: Hamster Productions; JLA Productions; Benjamin Films; France 2 Cinéma; Canal+; Télévision Suisse-Romande (TSR)
- Distributed by: Capitol Films
- Release date: 10 January 2001 (France)
- Running time: 109 minutes
- Countries: France; Switzerland
- Language: French

Lisa is a 2001 French-Swiss romantic drama war film directed by Pierre Grimblat based on the novel Théâtre dans la nuit by Patrick Cauvin, starring Jeanne Moreau, Marion Cotillard, Benoît Magimel and Sagamore Stévenin. It was released theatrically in France by Capitol Films on 10 January 2001.

== Plot ==
After he finds an uncompleted film from 1939 called "Princess Marushka", Sam, a filmmaker, becomes intrigued with the young actor Sylvain Marceau. Sam decides to make a documentary about Sylvain and interviews those who knew him, including an old lady named Lisa Morain. Through her interview, Sam learns the story of Lisa and Sylvain's doomed love affair during World War II.

== Cast ==
- Jeanne Moreau as Lisa Morain
- Marion Cotillard as Young Lisa
- Benoît Magimel as Sam
- Sagamore Stévenin as Sylvain Marceau
- Julia Vaidis-Bogard as Henriette
- Michel Jonasz as Benjamin
- Catherine Arditi as Marina
- Denise Chalem as Simone
- Johan Leysen as Professor Seyden
- Micky El Mazroui as Samy
- Jacques Pater as Castellain
- Marisa Berenson as Princess Maruschka
- Pierre Dherte as Edouard
- Filip Peeters as Colonel von Boll
- Hélène Theunissen as Mrs. Ergolsheim
- Pierre Grimblat as Serge Mauro

== Awards and nominations ==
Year	Award / Film Festoval	Category	Recipient(s)	Result	Ref.
2001	Schermi d'Amore Verona Film Festival	Best Actress	Marion Cotillard	Won	
