= Pretty Things (2001 film) =

2001 film by Gilles Paquet-Brenner

- Theatrical release poster
- French: Les Jolies Choses
- Directed by: Gilles Paquet-Brenner
- Screenplay by: Gilles Paquet-Brenner
- Based on: Les Jolies Choses by Virginie Despentes
- Produced by: Stéphane Marsil
- Starring: Marion Cotillard; Stomy Bugsy; Patrick Bruel; Ophélie Winter; Titoff
- Cinematography: Pascal Ridao
- Edited by: Bertrand Collard
- Music by: David Moreau
- Production companies: Hugo Films; M6 Films; C.A.P.A.C.
- Distributed by: United International Pictures
- Release dates: 21 July 2001 (Melbourne); 14 November 2001 (France)
- Running time: 105 minutes
- Country: France
- Language: French
- Budget: €3.3 million ($3.8 million)
- Box office: $913,068

Pretty Things (French: Les Jolies Choses) is a 2001 French drama film written and directed by Gilles Paquet-Brenner, based on the 1998 novel Les Jolies Choses by Virginie Despentes. It won the Prix Michel d'Ornano at the 2001 Deauville American Film Festival. In the film, Marion Cotillard portrays twins of completely opposite characters, Lucie and Marie. She was nominated for a César Award for Most Promising Actress for her performance.

== Cast ==
- Marion Cotillard as Marie / Lucie
  - Clémence Roussillon as young Marie
  - Anna Roussillon as young Lucie
- Stomy Bugsy as Nicolas
- Patrick Bruel as Jacques
- Titoff as Sébastien
- Ophélie Winter as Jessica
- Tony Amoni as Steve
- Matthieu Touboul as Martin
- Olivier Granier as the father
- Aude Brenner as the mother
- Nikita Lespinasse as Heidi
- Guy Amram as Fred
- Martin Amic as Arthur
- Axelle Renoir as the journalist

== Awards and nominations ==
Year	Award	Category	Nominated work	Result
2001	Deauville Film Festival	Michel d'Ornano Award	Gilles Paquet-Brenner	Won
2002	César Awards	Most Promising Actress	Marion Cotillard	Nominated
