= From the Land of the Moon (film) =

2016 film by Nicole Garcia

- Theatrical release poster
- French: Mal de pierres
- Directed by: Nicole Garcia
- Written by: Nicole Garcia; Jacques Fieschi
- Based on: From the Land of the Moon by Milena Agus
- Produced by: Alain Attal
- Starring: Marion Cotillard; Louis Garrel; Alex Brendemühl
- Cinematography: Christophe Beaucarne
- Edited by: Simon Jacquet
- Music by: Daniel Pemberton
- Production company: Les Productions du Trésor
- Distributed by: StudioCanal
- Release dates: 15 May 2016 (Cannes); 19 October 2016 (France)
- Running time: 120 minutes
- Country: France
- Language: French
- Budget: €10.5 million
- Box office: $6.5 million

From the Land of the Moon (French: Mal de pierres, literally "disease of the stones") is a 2016 French film directed by Nicole Garcia from a screenplay she co-wrote with Jacques Fieschi, adapted from the 2006 Italian novella of the same name by Milena Agus. It stars Marion Cotillard, Louis Garrel and Alex Brendemühl. The film had its world premiere at the 2016 Cannes Film Festival where it competed for the Palme d'Or, and received eight nominations for the 2017 César Awards, including Best Film, Best Director for Nicole Garcia, and Best Actress for Marion Cotillard.

== Plot ==
At the end of WWII, a woman enters a marriage of convenience to a man who had shown kindness to her family during the war. Sickly from kidney stones, she travels to a fancy clinic for treatment and falls in love with a veteran she meets there. After they part, she considers whether to build a family with the man who loves her or re-kindle the lost bond with the man she loved while briefly away from home.

== Cast ==
- Marion Cotillard as Gabrielle
- Louis Garrel as André Sauvage
- Àlex Brendemühl as José
- Brigitte Roüan as Adèle
- Victoire Du Bois as Jeannine
- Aloïse Sauvage as Agostine
- Daniel Para as Martin
- Jihwan Kim as Blaise
- Victor Quilichini as 14-year-old Marc

== Production ==
On 10 June 2014, Variety reported that Marion Cotillard would star in Nicole Garcia's upcoming film, Mal de Pierres, an adaptation of Milena Agus' 2006 novel of the same name. The screenplay was co-written by Garcia and frequent collaborator Jacques Fieschi. The film was produced by Alain Attal's Les Productions du Trésor.

The film's production budget was €10.5 million.

== Release ==
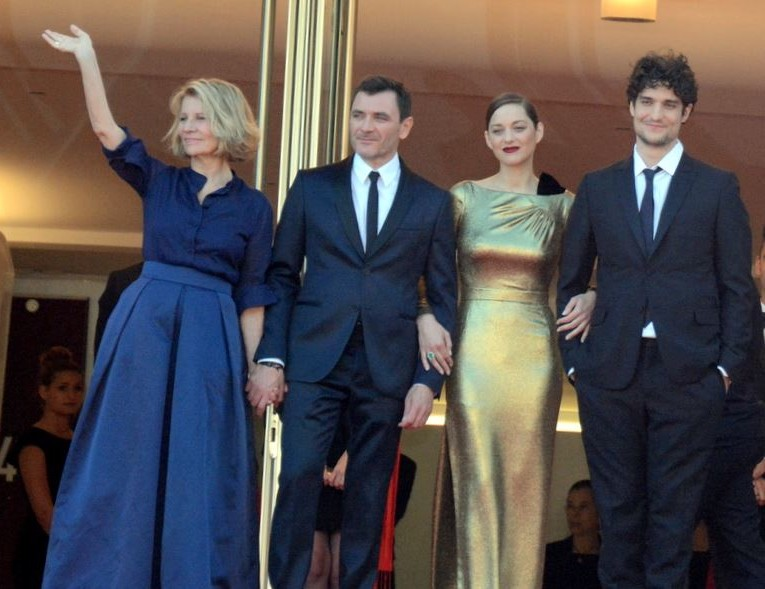
Director and stars at the 2016 Cannes Film Festival.

In May 2015, StudioCanal acquired distribution rights to the film in United Kingdom, France, Germany and Australia. In March 2016, Sundance Selects acquired U.S distribution rights to the film.

== Reception ==
=== Critical response ===
AlloCiné, a French cinema site, gave the film an average rating of 3.5/5, based on a survey of 30 French reviews.

For Time Out, reviewer Geoff Andrew commented that the film "starts fairly stodgily but then turns into something interesting, even a little unusual", a "tale of amour fou – loving the ideal of love, rather than an individual – and so Gabrielle is driven to distraction. Crucially, Garcia respects her dreams and desires, which are at odds with the mores of the time, but she doesn't romanticise the woman. The result, despite an uncertain start, is in the end a surprisingly intriguing and affecting movie."

American critics were less enthusiastic in their response. On Rotten Tomatoes the film has an approval rating of 32% based on reviews from 56 critics, with an average score of 4.73/10. The website's critics consensus reads: "From the Land of the Moon benefits from striking visuals and strong work from Marion Cotillard, but they're both ultimately overcome by a story that drifts into wan melodrama." On Metacritic the film has a score of 40 out of 100, based on reviews from 17 critics, indicating "mixed or average reviews". Alan Zilberman of the Washington Post said, "Moments of visual beauty only call attention to the stilted dialogue and maudlin plot that otherwise define the film." Sheri Linden of the Los Angeles Times said, "Marion Cotillard shines", but director Garcia's "lush period drama equates hyper-romance with both self-realization and delusion, a proposition that proves more muddled than illuminating."

=== Box office ===
In France, From the Land of the Moon was released to 335 screens, where it debuted at number nine at the box office, selling 283,843 tickets. It sold a total of 669,856 tickets and grossed $4,718,885 after 13 weeks in French cinemas. The film grossed a total of $6,547,983 worldwide.

=== Accolades ===
The film was nominated for several awards at the César Awards and elsewhere in Europe, including for Cotillard's performance and the cinematography by Christophe Beaucarne.

Year	Award / Film Festival	Category	Recipient(s)	Result	Ref.
2016	Cannes Film Festival	Palme d'Or	Nicole Garcia	Nominated	
2016	World Soundtrack Awards	Film Composer of the Year	Daniel Pemberton	Nominated	
2017	César Awards	Best Film	Nicole Garcia	Nominated	
2017	César Awards	Best Director	Nicole Garcia	Nominated	
2017	César Awards	Best Actress	Marion Cotillard	Nominated	
2017	César Awards	Best Cinematography	Christophe Beaucarne	Nominated	
2017	César Awards	Best Adapted Screenplay	Nicole Garcia, Jacques Fieschi	Nominated	
2017	César Awards	Best Costume Design	Catherine Leterrier	Nominated	
2017	César Awards	Best Editing	Simon Jacquet	Nominated	
2017	César Awards	Best Sound	Jean-Pierre Duret, Sylvain Malbrant, Jean-Pierre Laforce	Nominated	
2017	Globes de Cristal Award	Best Film	Nicole Garcia	Nominated	
2017	Lumière Awards	Best Actress	Marion Cotillard	Nominated	
2017	Lumière Awards	Best Cinematography	Christophe Beaucarne	Nominated	
