= Love Me If You Dare (film) =

2003 film by Yann Samuell

- Theatrical release poster
- French: Jeux d'enfants
- Directed by: Yann Samuell
- Written by: Yann Samuell
- Produced by: Christophe Rossignon
- Starring: Guillaume Canet; Marion Cotillard; Thibault Verhaeghe; Joséphine Lebas-Joly; Emmanuelle Grönvold; Gilles Lellouche; Julia Faure; Laetizia Venezia
- Cinematography: Antoine Roch
- Edited by: Judith Rivière Kawa; Andrea Sedlácková
- Music by: Philippe Rombi
- Production companies: Nord-Ouest Productions; StudioCanal; Artémis Productions; Media Services; France 2 Cinéma; M6 Films; Caneo Films
- Distributed by: Mars Distribution (France); Cinéart (Belgium)
- Release dates: 29 August 2003 (Telluride); 17 September 2003 (France); 24 September 2003 (Belgium)
- Running time: 92 minutes
- Countries: France; Belgium
- Language: French
- Budget: €5.3 million
- Box office: $8.6 million

Love Me If You Dare (French: Jeux d'enfants, lit. 'Children's Games') is a 2003 romantic comedy-drama film written and directed by Yann Samuell. It stars Guillaume Canet and Marion Cotillard as best friends Julien Janvier and Sophie Kowalsky, who begin playing a game of dares as children and find themselves unable to stop as they grow older, even when the game threatens to destroy their lives.

An international co-production between France and Belgium, the film had its world premiere at the Telluride Film Festival on 29 August 2003. It was released theatrically in France by Mars Distribution on 17 September 2003 and in Belgium by Cinéart on 24 September 2003. It was a box office success in France and sold over one million tickets.

== Plot ==
When eight-year-old Julien Janvier goes to catch the school bus one morning, he finds classmate Sophie Kowalsky being bullied by their classmates for being Polish. To cheer Sophie up, Julien gives her a small tin box with a merry-go-round on it, a gift from his terminally ill mother. Because it is important to him, he asks her to lend it back to him from time to time. When Sophie demands proof of how important it is to Julien, he disengages the handbrake of the school bus filled with children, sending it rolling down the street. They then create their own game of dares: whenever one of them is in possession of the box, the other must complete a dare.

A lasting friendship develops between the son of wealthy Belgian parents and the daughter of poor Polish immigrants. They take turns giving each other dares, such as saying profanities to teachers, urinating in front of the headmaster and wreaking havoc at Sophie's older sister's wedding (during which Julien accepts Sophie's dare to say "no" at the altar if he ever gets married), with no regard for consequences or punishment. Julien's father takes a dislike to Sophie for encouraging his son's rebellious streak, but arranges for her to have a sleepover with Julien after his mother dies of cancer. When Julien expresses interest in visiting Sophie, she makes him promise that he will never come to her place.

As they grow older, the pair, now university students, continue their game. They develop feelings for each other and eventually kiss. Meanwhile, Julien's relationship with his father becomes increasingly strained, with Julien's father blaming him for his mother's death. When Julien visits Sophie's apartment in a housing project, she berates him for not keeping his promise. Some time later, Sophie approaches Julien in a library, but his refusal to admit his feelings prompts her to leave on a bus. He chases after the bus while proclaiming that he loves her, but the bus drives away.

Julien and Sophie reunite four years later. At a restaurant, he tells her that he is in love and wants to get married, before introducing Sophie to his fiancée, Christelle. Sophie interrupts Julien's wedding ceremony, daring him to say "no" at the altar. This infuriates Julien's father, who severs ties with his son. Afterwards, Sophie is nearly killed after Julien dares her to stand blindfolded on railway tracks. After daring Julien to stay completely out of touch for ten years, Sophie reconciles with her on-and-off boyfriend, footballer Sergueï Nimov-Nemovich.

Ten years later, Julien is married to Christelle and has two children, while Sophie is married to Sergueï, who is now a football star. Julien admits that he misses Sophie, though he assumes that she has forgotten him. On the night of Julien's tenth wedding anniversary, he receives a message from Sophie, indicating that the game is back on. Julien meets Sophie at her home to find that she, as a dare, has staged a burglary and framed him for it. Pursued by the police, an overjoyed Julien speeds away in his car as he proclaims that their game is "better than life itself". After Julien survives a car crash, he and Sophie finally reunite, despite the protestations of their spouses.

The film has two alternate endings, which are shown consecutively. In the first, Julien and Sophie decide as an ultimate dare to finally fulfill their "dream of an endless love"—the pair embrace as they stand in a construction pit that is about to be filled with cement. The couple kiss while encased in a block of concrete, on top of which the tin box rests partly sunk. The other ending has the now aged Julien and Sophie in a retirement home where they carry on playing their game, including Julien urinating in front of a staff member.

== Cast ==
- Guillaume Canet as Julien Janvier
  - Thibault Verhaeghe as 8-year-old Julien
  - Robert Willar as 80-year-old Julien
- Marion Cotillard as Sophie Kowalsky
  - Joséphine Lebas-Joly as 8-year-old Sophie
  - Nathalie Nattier as 80-year-old Sophie
- Emmanuelle Grönvold as Julien's mother
- Gérard Watkins as Julien's father
- Gilles Lellouche as Sergueï Nimov-Nimovitch
- Julia Faure as Sophie's sister
- Laetizia Venezia as Christelle Louise Bouchard
- Élodie Navarre as Aurélie Miller
- Frédéric Geerts as Igor
- Manuela Sanchez as teacher
- Philippe Drecq as school headmaster

== Production ==
Filming took place mostly in Liège, Belgium, in 2002.

== Soundtrack ==
Jeux d'enfants

Soundtrack album by Philippe Rombi
- Released: September 9, 2003
- Genre: Soundtrack
- Label: Universal Music Group

Professional ratings
Review scores
Source	Rating
Music from the Movies	link

The song "La Vie en Rose" permeates the film and dominates much of the soundtrack. Several distinct versions are used, including the Édith Piaf original, covers by Donna Summer, Louis Armstrong, the Brazilian a cappella group Trio Esperança, and French pop artist Zazie, as well as a handful of instrumental cuts.

A piano arrangement, Ouverture by Philippe Rombi, can also be heard throughout the film.

=== Track listing ===
1. Ouverture – 5:05
2. Love Theme – 2:29
3. Solitude / L'Escalier du Temps – 2:22
4. Beethov' Fantaisie / Cap Ou Pas Cap? – 1:22
5. Jeux d'enfants – 2:12
6. Les Lunettes Magiques – 1:51
7. Derniers Instants – 2:41
8. Premier Baiser – 2:20
9. Declaration / Separation – 2:30
10. Invitation – 5:15
11. La Vie en Rose (Trio Esperança) – 2:33
12. 10 Ans Plus Tard – 2:23
13. Mieux Que La Vie (Poursuite) – 2:23
14. La Vie en Rose (Donna Summer) – 4:56
15. Le Meilleur et le Pire – 1:49
16. Sous la Pluie – 3:30
17. Pour Toujours (Love Theme) – 1:49
18. La Vie en Rose (Louis Armstrong) – 3:24
19. La Vie en Rose (Zazie) – 3:54

== Release ==
Love Me If You Dare had its world premiere at the Telluride Film Festival on 29 August 2003. It was released theatrically in France by Mars Distribution on 17 September 2003 and in Belgium by Cinéart on 24 September 2003. The film was a box office success in France, selling over one million tickets. It grossed $8.6 million worldwide.

== Critical reception ==
Love Me If You Dare received mixed reviews from North American critics. On the review aggregator website Rotten Tomatoes, the film holds an approval rating of 44% based on 77 reviews, with an average rating of 5.4/10. The website's critics consensus reads, "The romantic leads are too obnoxious and self-centered to generate interest or sympathy." Metacritic, which uses a weighted average, assigned the film a score of 45 out of 100, based on 30 reviews, indicating "mixed or average" reviews. AlloCiné, a French film website, gave the film an average rating of 2.9/5, based on a survey of 14 French reviews,

Roger Ebert of the Chicago Sun-Times gave the film two out of four stars and called the film "strangely frustrating, because Julien and Sophie choose misery and obsession as a lifestyle, and push far beyond reason." Lisa Nesselson of Variety described the film as a "[v]aliant attempt to create a modern fairytale [that] ends up being frustratingly creepy instead of haunting and memorable" and wrote, "Despite attractive leads, heaps of thoughtful production design and gung-ho special effects, this misguided tale never truly convinces." Kevin Thomas of the Los Angeles Times concluded, "The film is loaded with striking visuals, high energy and all-stops portrayals from its actors, but for all of Samuell's imaginative cinematic bravura, it is, finally, mainly exasperating." Conversely, James Berardinelli of Reelviews awarded the film three out of four stars and praised Canet's and Cotillard's performances, opining that they "make one of the most delightful screen couples in recent years."
