= Saint-Gilles-Croix-de-Vie =

- Commune
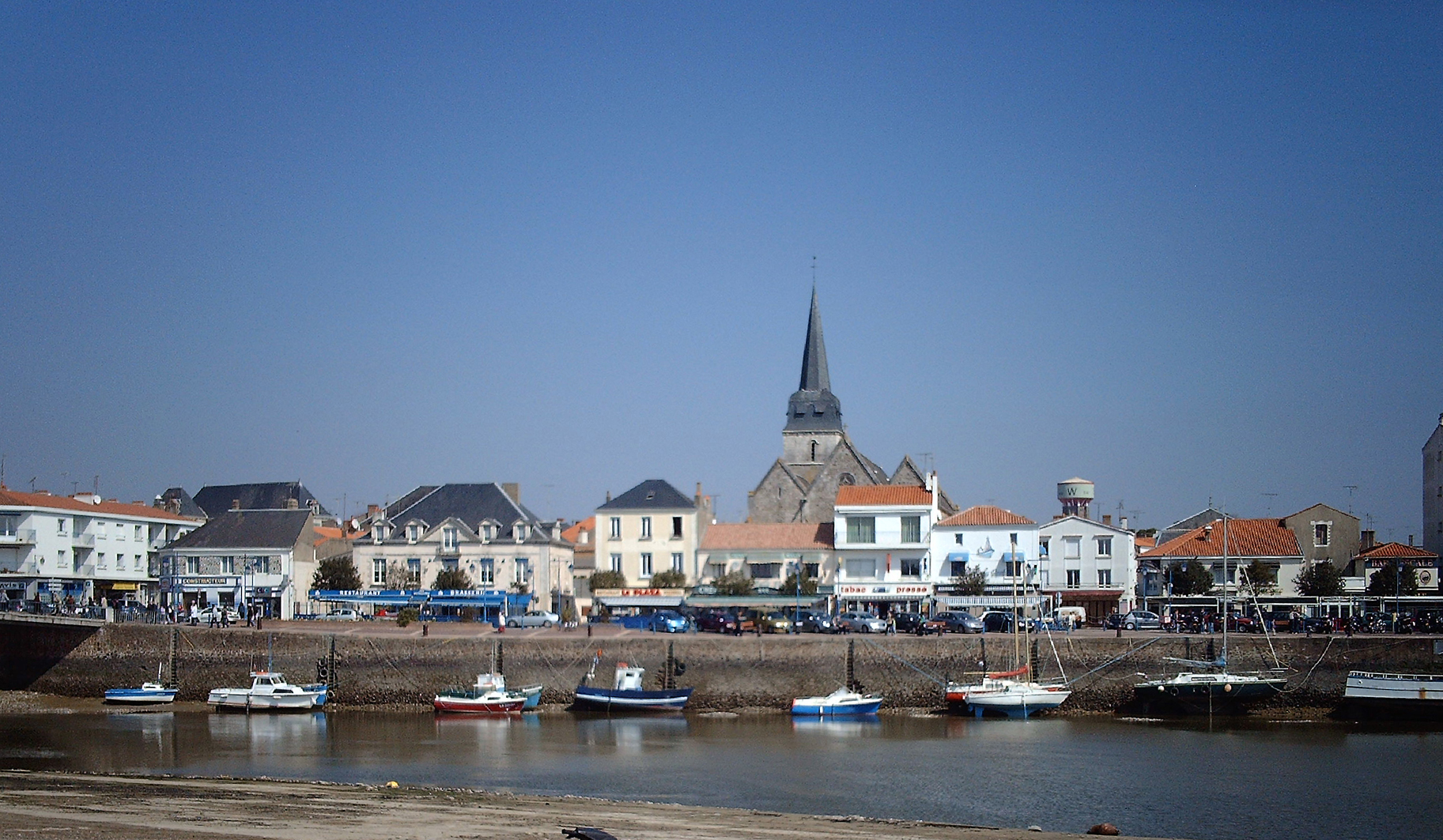
- A general view of Saint-Gilles-Croix-de-Vie

- Coat of arms
- Location of Saint-Gilles-Croix-de-Vie
- Location within France Location within Pays de la Loire
- Coordinates: 46°41′54″N 1°56′22″W
- Country: France
- Region: Pays de la Loire
- Department: Vendée
- Arrondissement: Les Sables-d'Olonne
- Canton: Saint-Hilaire-de-Riez
- Intercommunality: CA Pays de Saint-Gilles-Croix-de-Vie

Government
  - Mayor (2020–2026): François Blanchet
- Area^{1}: 10.25 km^{2} (3.96 sq mi)
- Highest elevation: 28 m (92 ft)
- Lowest elevation: 0 m (0 ft)
- Population (2023): 8,333
  - Density: 813.0/km^{2} (2,106/sq mi)
- Time zone: UTC+01:00 (CET)
  - Summer (DST): UTC+02:00 (CEST)
- INSEE/Postal code: 85222 /85800
- Website: Site
- ^{1} French Land Register data, which excludes lakes, ponds, glaciers > 1 km^{2} (0.386 sq mi or 247 acres) and river estuaries.

Saint-Gilles-Croix-de-Vie (French pronunciation: [sɛ̃ ʒil kʁwa d(ə) vi]) is a commune in the Vendée department, region of Pays de la Loire, western France.

It is situated on the Côte de Lumière. The community originated in 1967 from the unification of two communities on either side of the estuary of the river the Vie, Saint-Gilles-sur-Vie and Croix-de-Vie.

Known for its important fishing harbor (specializing in sardines), since 1982 Saint-Gilles-Croix-de-Vie is also classified as a seaside resort.

== History ==
In the ninth century, the monks of Saint-Gilles-du-Gard settled in what was then called Sidunum, a priory and a fortified church. In the Middle Ages, the city, organized around the main street (now the Rue Torterue) became an important port, capable of accommodating ships with a capacity of one hundred tons.

Croix-de-Vie appeared on the right bank of the Vie, when the Duke of Montausier granted Saint-Gilles plots of land on the "small island" so they could build their homes. In 1610, Marie Beaucaire built the large pier and the wharf and then a chapel from 1611 to 1613. This building was used for worship until the construction of Sainte-Croix Church in 1896 which is used today.

In 1622, King Louis XIII spent dinner one night in Croix de Vie, in a mansion located what is now in General de Gaulle street.

Although Saint-Gilles-Croix-de-Vie was three hours from Nantes and ten hours from Paris, the development of railways from the 1880s increasingly allowed holidaymakers to reach the seaside town. A trade union initiative was created in 1922. On 23 January 1967, Saint-Gilles-sur-Vie and Croix-de-Vie merged to create the new municipality of Saint-Gilles-Croix-de-Vie. The fusion was the idea of Marcel Ragon and Charles Grasset. Ragon became the first mayor of the new municipality while the latter, who had served as deputy mayor of Croix-de-Vie from March 1965 until December 1966, went on to serve under Ragon as deputy mayor of the new municipality until 1995.

In 1982, Saint-Gilles-Croix-de-Vie was classified as a resort.

== Geography ==
=== Location ===
Location of the canton of Saint-Gilles-Croix-de-Vie (in red) within the Vendée.

Situated on the coastline of the Atlantic Ocean, along the côte de Lumière about 70 kilometres from Nantes, 320 from Bordeaux, 450 from Paris and 600 from Lyon, Saint-Gilles-Croix-de-Vie covers an area of 10.3 square kilometres.

It is bordered by the communes of Saint-Hilaire-de-Riez to the north, Le Fenouiller to the north east, Givrand to the southeast, and Bretignolles-sur-Mer to the south. Saint-Gilles-Croix-de-Vie station has rail connections to Sainte-Pazanne and Nantes.

It was the chef-lieu of the former canton of Saint-Gilles-Croix-de-Vie, which had an area of 29,192 hectares and contained 14 communes: L'Aiguillon-sur-Vie, Brem-sur-Mer, Bretignolles-sur-Mer, La Chaize-Giraud, Coëx, Commequiers, Le Fenouiller, Givrand, Landevieille, Notre-Dame-de-Riez, Saint-Hilaire-de-Riez, Saint-Gilles-Croix-de-Vie, Saint-Maixent-sur-Vie and Saint-Révérend.

=== Climate ===
The meteorological measurements began in 1877 in Saint-Gilles.

The climate of the Vendée department is oceanic. The coast experiences significant rainfall in winter and a few storms. Under the influence of the Atlantic Ocean, the climate is cool in summer. However, the Vendée is one of the sunniest departments of France in terms of the energy received, with 1268 kWh per m^{2} per year.

== Population ==
Historical population
Year	Pop.	±% p.a.
1968	6,178	—
1975	6,725	+1.22%
1982	6,159	−1.25%
1990	6,296	+0.28%
1999	6,797	+0.85%
2007	7,260	+0.83%
2012	7,409	+0.41%
2017	7,655	+0.66%
2023	8,333	+1.42%
Source: INSEE

== Culture ==
=== Religion ===
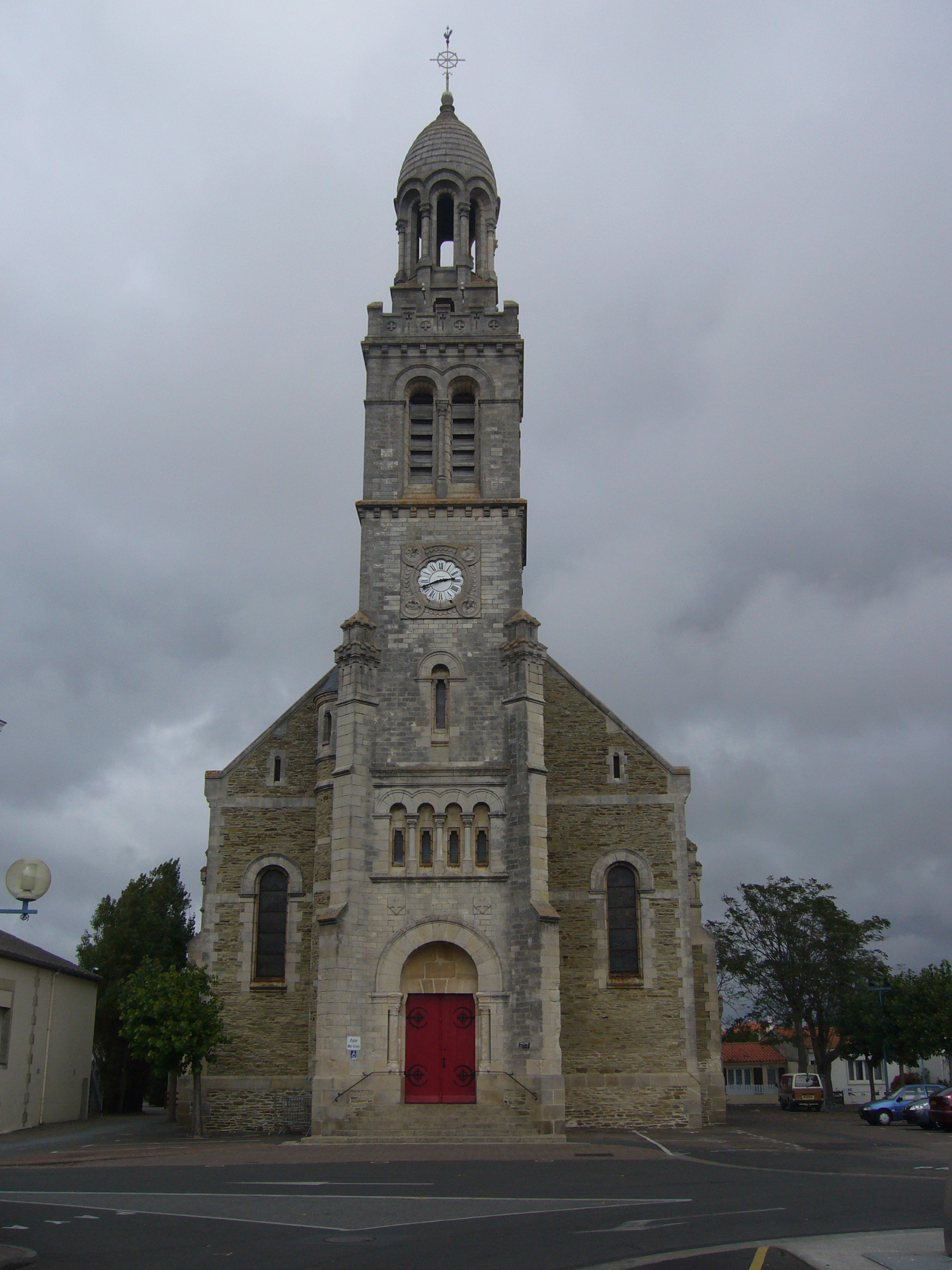
Saint-Gilles-Croix-de-Vie church (1896)

The town has two Catholic churches (one on either side of the river), the churches of Saint-Gilles et Sainte-Croix. Saint-Gilles-Croix-de-Vie is part of the diocese of Luçon, which is part of the ecclesiastical province of Rennes. It is the seat of a deanery of four parishes: Sainte Anne de Riez (around the town of Saint-Hilaire-de-Riez), Saint Jean du Gué Gorand (Coëx), Saint Nicolas de l'Océan (Bretignolles-sur-Mer), and Notre Dame de la Vie (Saint-Gilles-Croix-de-Vie). The latter, Notre Dame de la Vie, has four bell towers—in the churches of Saint-Gilles and Sainte-Croix, as well as those of Fenouiller and Givrand.

In the middle of the sixteenth century, a protestant church was founded in Saint-Gilles-sur-Vie; it was destroyed in November 1665, as one of seventeen protestant churches in the Bas-Poitou, the region that corresponds to today's Vendée.

=== The Brotherhood of the Sardine ===
The Brotherhood of the Sardine (Confrérie de la Sardine) was founded in 1991. Headed by a grandmaster, it is devoted to the promotion of the seaside resort and the celebration of products from the sea, especially the sardine, which has become a speciality of Saint-Gilles-Croix-de-Vie. Notable "sympathizers" include sailor Michel Desjoyeaux, actress Isabel Otero, and the former Prime Minister of France François Fillon.

== Companies ==
- Beneteau – boat manufacturer, founded in 1884 in Croix-de-Vie

== Personalities ==
- Marcel Baudouin (1860–1941) -physician
- Narcisse Pelletier (1844–1894) -castaway
- Benjamin Bénéteau, founder of the commune in 1884.
- Marie de Beaucaire (1535–1613), Baronness of Rié. Did much to facilitate development into a town.,.
- Pierre Desproges (1939–1988), comedian
- Pierre Garcie-Ferrande, (1430–1520) cartographer.
- Charles Atamian (1872–1947) -painter, painted many scenes of the Saint-Gilles-Croix-de-Vie shore.
- Émile Goué (1904–1946), composer, composed Wanda (1934) situated in Croix-de-Vie.

== See also ==
- Communes of the Vendée department
