= Vie (river) =

River in western France

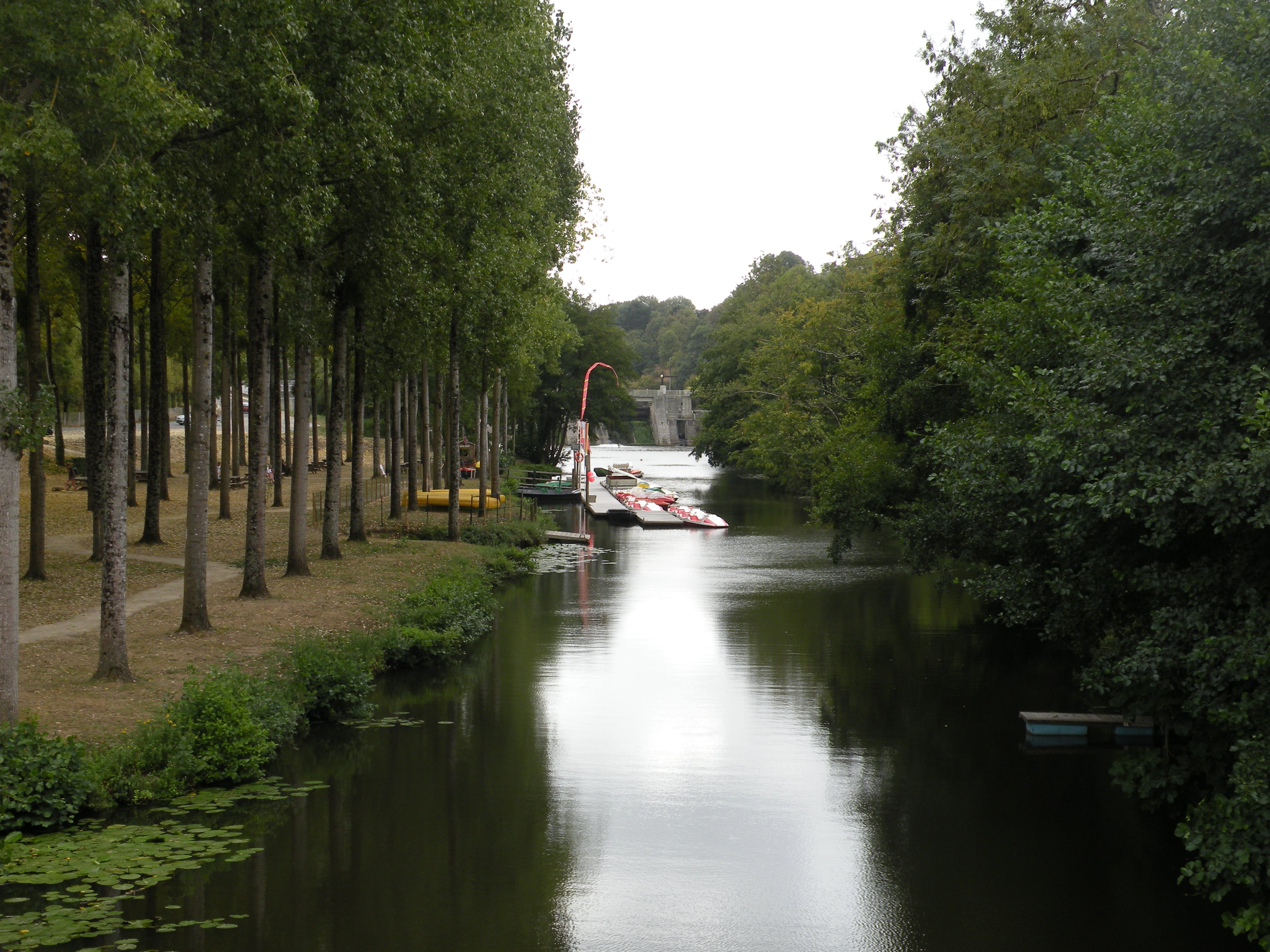
- The Vie in Apremont

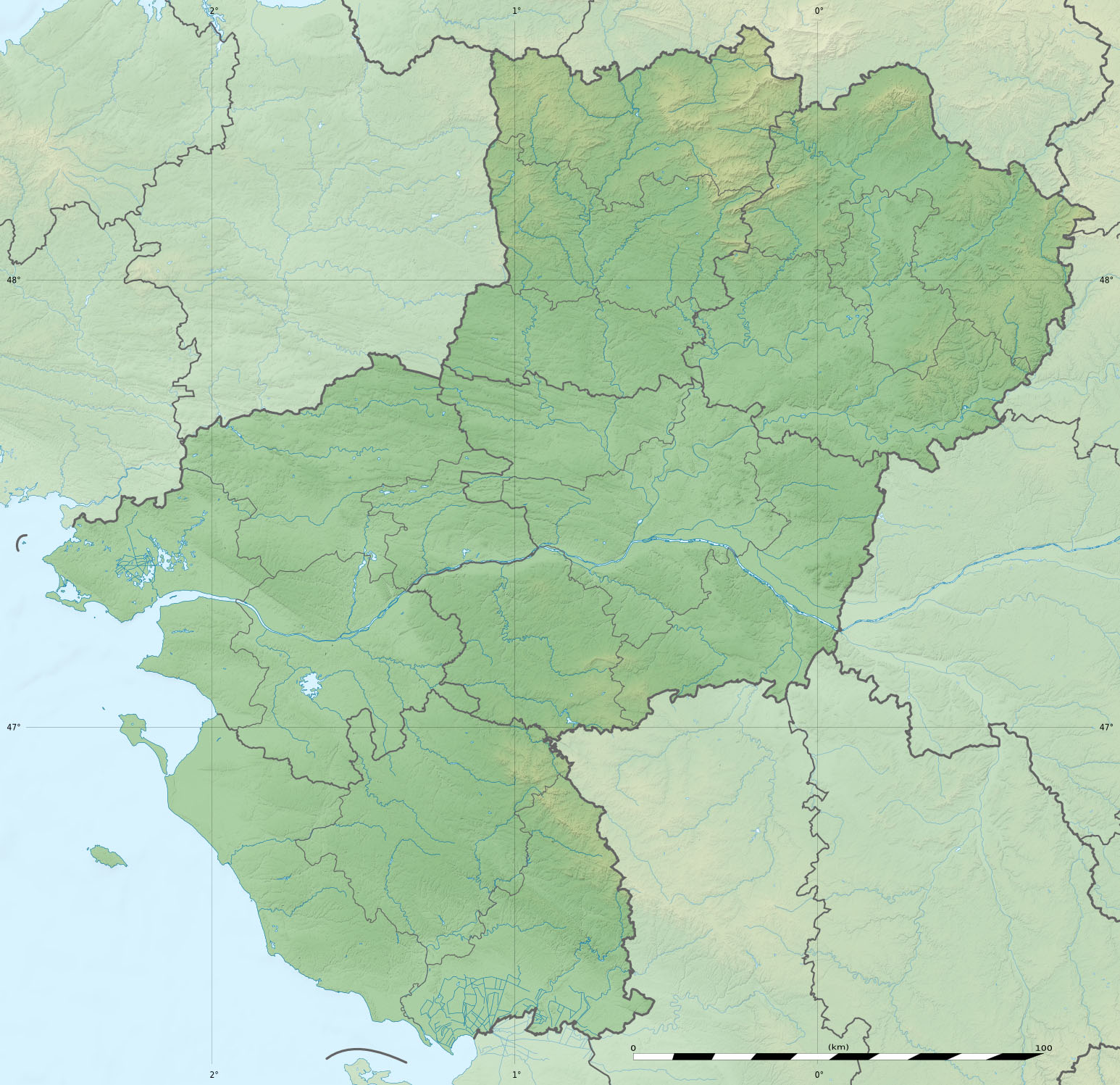

Location
- Country: France

Physical characteristics
- Source
  - location: Vendée
  - coordinates: 46.7458°N 1.4266°W
- Mouth
  - location: Atlantic Ocean
  - coordinates: 46.6964°N 1.9481°W
- Length: 62.3 km (38.7 mi)
- Basin size: 753 km^{2} (291 sq mi)

The Vie (French pronunciation: [vi]) is an 62.3 km (38.7 mi) long river in the department of Vendée, western France. Its source is near the town Belleville-sur-Vie. It flows generally west. It discharges into the Atlantic Ocean in Saint-Gilles-Croix-de-Vie.

== Communes along its course ==
The following list is ordered from source to mouth:

- Vendée: Bellevigny, Le Poiré-sur-Vie, Aizenay, La Chapelle-Palluau, Maché, Apremont, Coëx, Saint-Maixent-sur-Vie, Commequiers, Le Fenouiller, Notre-Dame-de-Riez, Saint-Hilaire-de-Riez, Saint-Gilles-Croix-de-Vie
