= Aizenay =

- Commune
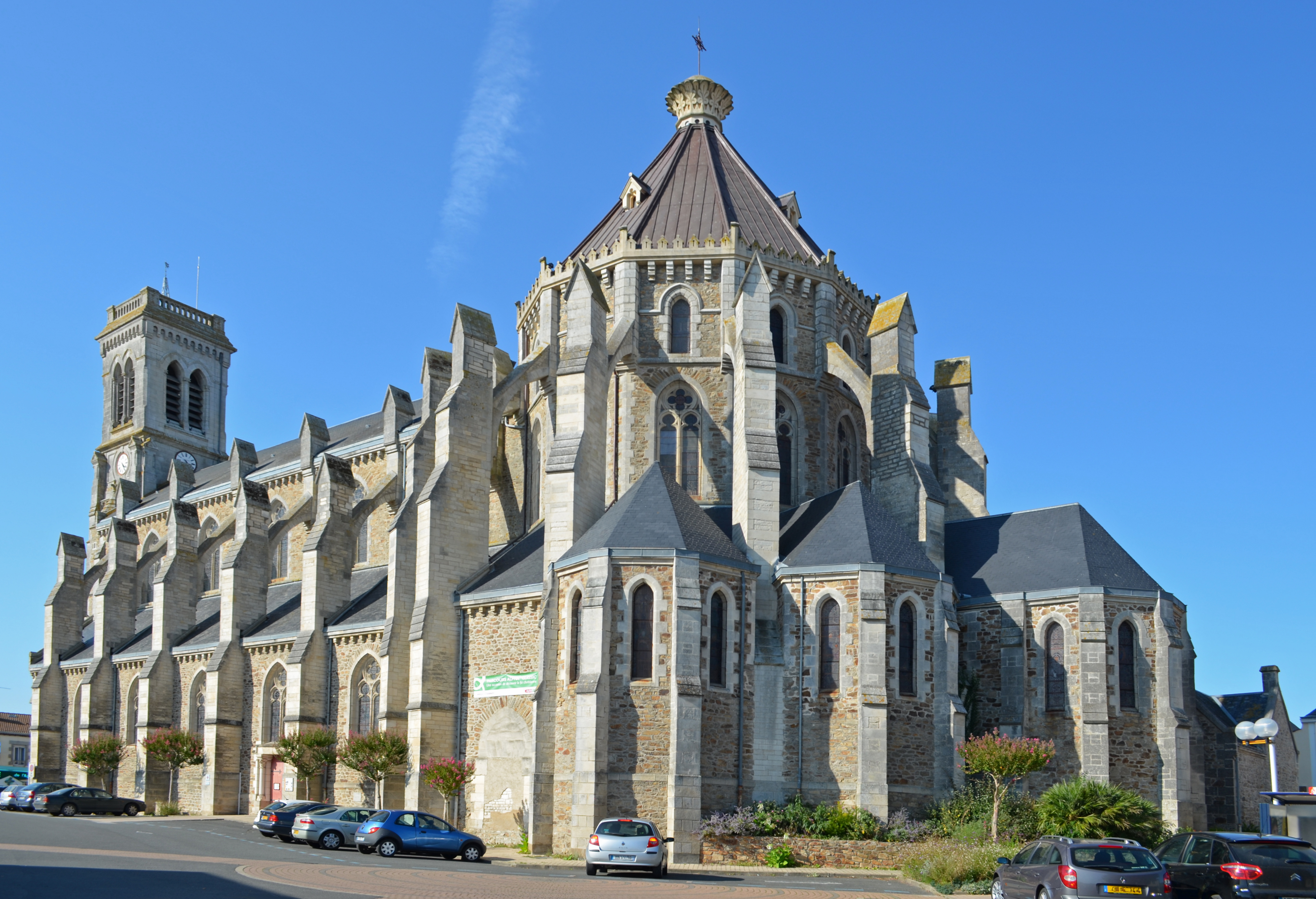
- The church of Saint-Benoît, in Aizenay

- Coat of arms
- Location of Aizenay
- Location within France Location within Pays de la Loire
- Coordinates: 46°44′24″N 1°36′30″W
- Country: France
- Region: Pays de la Loire
- Department: Vendée
- Arrondissement: La Roche-sur-Yon
- Canton: Aizenay
- Intercommunality: Vie et Boulogne

Government
  - Mayor (2020–2026): Franck Roy
- Area^{1}: 81.06 km^{2} (31.30 sq mi)
- Elevation: 62 m (203 ft)
- Highest elevation: 76 m (249 ft)
- Lowest elevation: 10 m (33 ft)
- Population (2023): 10,365
  - Density: 127.9/km^{2} (331.2/sq mi)
- Time zone: UTC+01:00 (CET)
  - Summer (DST): UTC+02:00 (CEST)
- INSEE/Postal code: 85003 /85190
- ^{1} French Land Register data, which excludes lakes, ponds, glaciers > 1 km^{2} (0.386 sq mi or 247 acres) and river estuaries.

Aizenay (French pronunciation: [ɛz(ə)nɛ]) is a commune in the Vendée department in the Pays de la Loire region in western France.

== Geography ==
Aizenay is 15 km north-west of La Roche-sur-Yon, 25 km from Saint-Gilles-Croix-de-Vie and Challans and 30 km from Les Sables d'Olonne (on the Atlantic Ocean Vendée coast).

Aizenay is bordered by the communes of La Chapelle-Palluau, Maché, Apremont, Coëx, La Chapelle-Hermier, Martinet, Beaulieu-sous-la-Roche, Venansault, La Génétouze and Le Poiré-sur-Vie.

Its northern boundary follows the course of the river Vie. The Aizenay Forest is the most prominent natural feature of the commune.

== History ==
There are the remains of cave dwellings along the edge of the Vie river. St. Benedict died in Aizenay in 360 at the Abbey of St. Benedict Quinçay. The church was registered an Aizenay Historical Monument in 2007.

On 27 March 1944, an American B-17 named "Big Red" crashed at the edge of the Aizenay in the woodland, killing 4 people. It was part of the 388th brigade which was bombing targets in the Bordeaux region at the time. 50 years later, in December 1994, the book "His Name Was Big Red" was published. On 1 July 1995 the "Path of Remembrance" was created and a monument erected on the site of the crash of the bomber. In fact, the pilot of "Big Red" survived; he hid in nearby woods, and was eventually hidden in a barn in a small hamlet called "La Nicolière", by Mme Idais, who lived in the hamlet. She risked her life (and those of the residents) by hiding the pilot. He was eventually disguised, put on a train, and went to Spain. The pilot died of cancer in the 1990s, but his widow returned to see Mme Idais (by then aged 80) to present her with a copy of the book, translated into French. This book is now available to buy in Aizenay, but at the time, her copy was the only one!

== Economy ==
The commune is a producer of wood, having notable forest resources. The commune has several plastics industries such as Cougnaud SA Atlantique Menuiserie, and Lapeyre-Saint-Gobain and businesses making textiles and footwear. The microwave firm Brandt also operates in the commune, as do several small mills and various agro-food companies.

There are many cattle, dairy, livestock and arable farms at Aizenay. The town's goat's cheese is well known.

Aizenay has a number of restaurants. "Le Fougerais" in Aizenay, a gourmet restaurant listed in the Michelin guide, closed in 2005.

== Population ==
Historical population
| Year | Pop. | ±% p.a. |
|---|---|---|
| 1968 | 4,348 | — |
| 1975 | 4,802 | +1.43% |
| 1982 | 5,149 | +1.00% |
| 1990 | 5,344 | +0.47% |
| 1999 | 6,095 | +1.47% |
| 2007 | 7,573 | +2.75% |
| 2012 | 8,494 | +2.32% |
| 2017 | 9,510 | +2.29% |
| 2023 | 10,365 | +1.45% |
Source: INSEE

== Landmarks ==
=== Church of Saint-Benoît ===
This church with its colorful stained glass, characteristic of the early twentieth century is a fine example of neo-Gothic architecture. It opened for worship on Christmas Day 1905, and it was consecrated in 1965. A processional cross, a true treasure of the church, was given as a gift by Louis XIII on 19 April 1622. The church also includes a sanctuary lamp in silver (17th century), chalices, statues and old crucifixes.

When restoration work began on the church in late 2005, workers were surprised to discover, beneath the floor, several sarcophagi and basements. The site has been protected since, and archaeological excavations took place in February 2007.

=== Aizenay Forest ===
To the east of the town, is Aizenay Forest, with a surface area of 420 hectares. It is classified as an area of special ecological interest.

There are five wooded areas open to the public, including La Grande Barriere, la Foret, le Cail Blanc, le Grand Bois, la Zone verte and le Bouquet. The River Vie and the River Yon meander through the forest.

=== Other landmarks ===
There are a few archaeological remains including a necropolis of the early Middle Ages around the old church and the château de "La Marronnière", which is the remains of the main building which replaced the central fortress in the fourteenth-fifteenth century. Today, the château is run down and no longer has any interest.

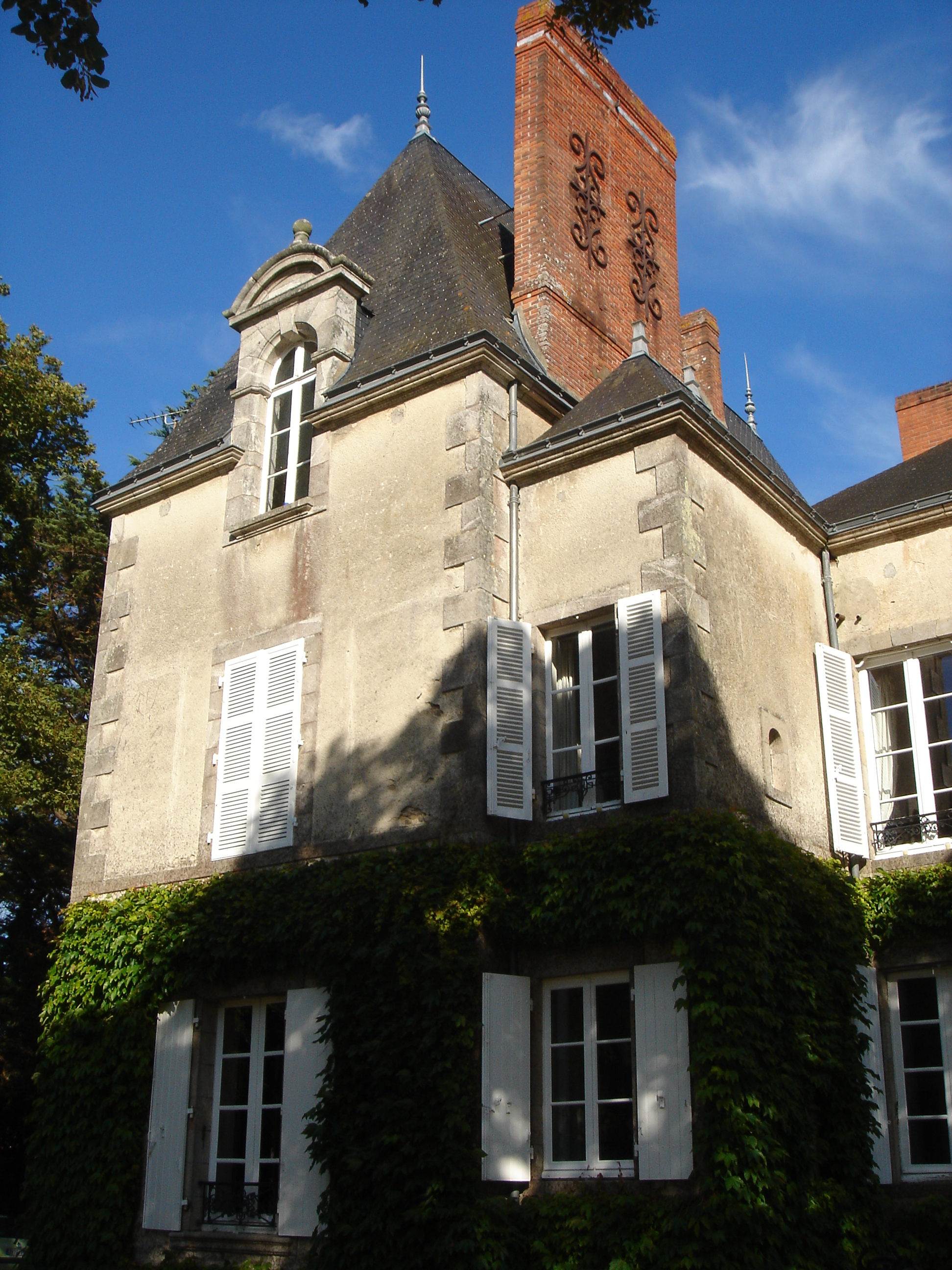

There is also the presence of several mansions such as "La Petitière" (mansion converted into a farm), "La Giraudinière" (an old château) or the "Grand Plessis". The commune has several other old buildings, including the Ecclesia de Asineis of the eleventh century, Asiniacum and Asianum of the twelfth, Asen, Asyanensis, Asiniacum and Aisenei of the thirteenth, Asiano, Ayzenoys and Aizenois of the fourteenth, Izenay of the seventeenth etc.

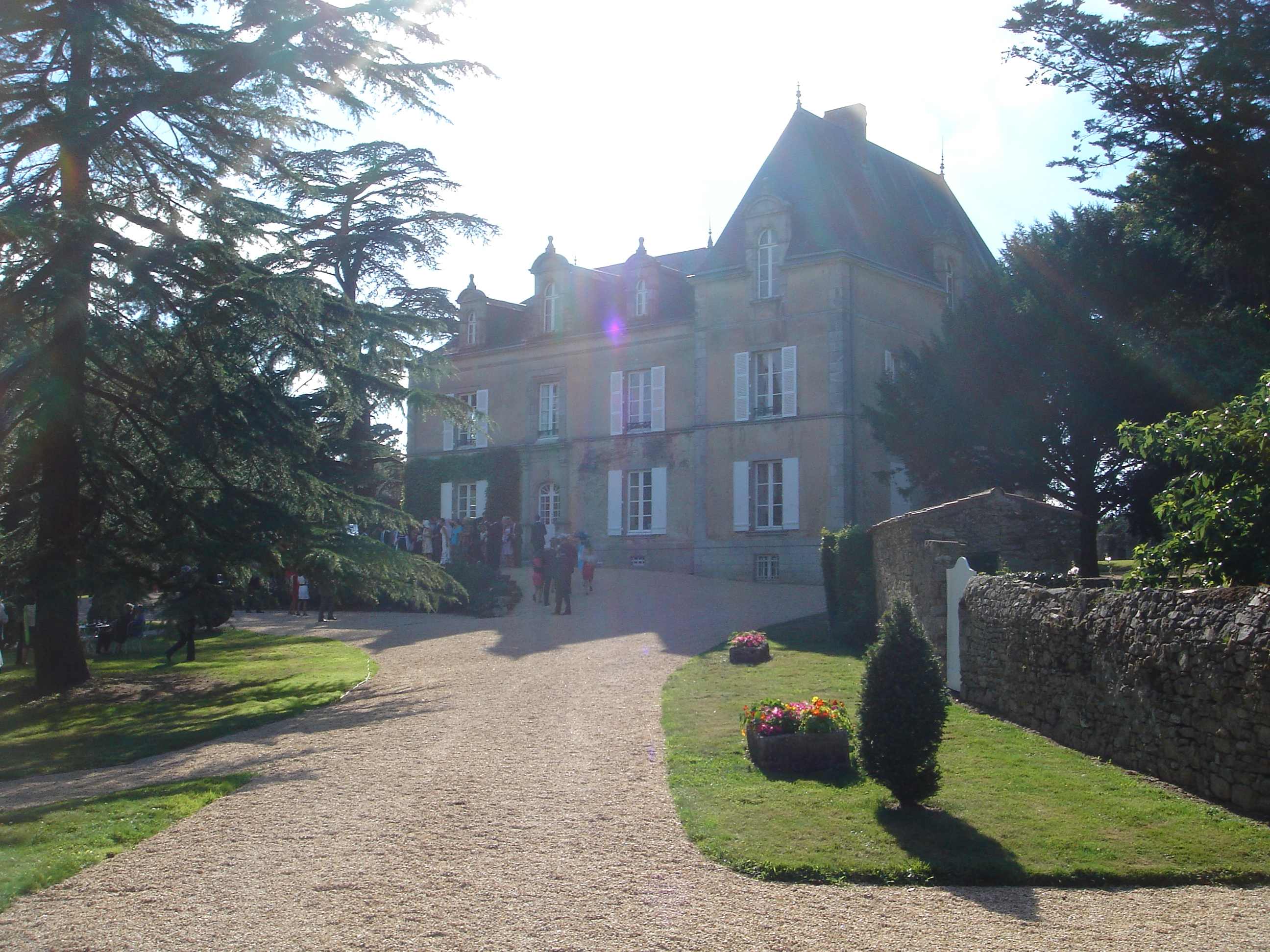

There are also outstanding features such as the "Bonnefonds" chimney.

== Transport ==
The commune is connected by the D948 highway from southeast to northwest, the D978 highway from south to north and the D6 highway from the southwest to the northeast. The short D2948 road also connects roads by passing through the southern outskirts of the main town.

== See also ==
- Communes of the Vendée department
