= Turning Tide =

- Theatrical release poster
- Directed by: Christophe Offenstein
- Written by: Christophe Offenstein; Jean Cottin; Frédéric Petitjean; Pierre Marcel; Marc Guilbert
- Produced by: Jean Cottin; Sidonie Dumas; Laurent Taïeb; Adolfo Blanco; Genevieve Lemal; Manuel Monzón
- Starring: François Cluzet; Samy Seghir
- Cinematography: Guillaume Schiffman
- Edited by: Ruy Diaz; Véronique Lange
- Music by: Patrice Renson; Víctor Reyes
- Distributed by: Gaumont
- Release dates: 25 August 2013 (Angoulême); 6 November 2013 (France)
- Running time: 101 minutes
- Country: France
- Language: French
- Budget: $17 million
- Box office: $6.2 million

Turning Tide (original title: En solitaire) is a 2013 French drama film directed by Christophe Offenstein.

== Plot ==
Yann Kermadec has short notice to replace the main skipper in the Vendée Globe. After a few days of racing, Yann's yacht is leading when he is forced to stop to repair its damaged rudder. This upends his chances in the round-the-world race.

== Cast ==
- François Cluzet as Yann Kermadec
- Samy Seghir as Mano Ixa
- Virginie Efira as Marie Drevil
- Guillaume Canet as Frank Drevil
- Jean-Paul Rouve as Denis Juhel
- Karine Vanasse as Mag Embling
- Arly Jover as Anna Bruckner
- José Coronado as José Monzon
- Philippe Lefebvre as Raphaël Keriou
- Dana Prigent as Léa Kermadec
- Guillaume Nicloux as The Race Director
- Emmanuelle Bercot as The Doctor
- Léa Fazer as The Mother
- Laure Duthilleul as The Teacher
- Stéphan Guérin-Tillié
- Steve Suissa

== Production ==
Principal photography began in October 2012, shooting for four weeks in Lorient. The production shot primarily at sea, including off the coast of Groix. It then moved to the Côte de Lumière, including Brem-sur-Mer and Les Sables-d'Olonne just before the start of the 2012–2013 Vendée Globe. Filming also travelled to the Canary Islands. In December, it returned to Lorient.

== Accolades ==
Award	Category	Recipient	Result
César Award	Best First Feature Film	Christophe Offenstein, Sidonie Dumas, Jean Cottin & Laurent Taïeb	Nominated
Gijón International Film Festival	Audience Award	Christophe Offenstein	Won
Lumière Awards	Best First Film	Christophe Offenstein	Nominated
