= Coex =

Coex may refer to:

- Coex (material), a biopolymer with flame-retardant properties
- COEX Convention & Exhibition Center, Seoul, South Korea
  - COEX Mall, an underground shopping mall
- Coëx, a commune in Vendée, France
