= Lac d'Apremont =

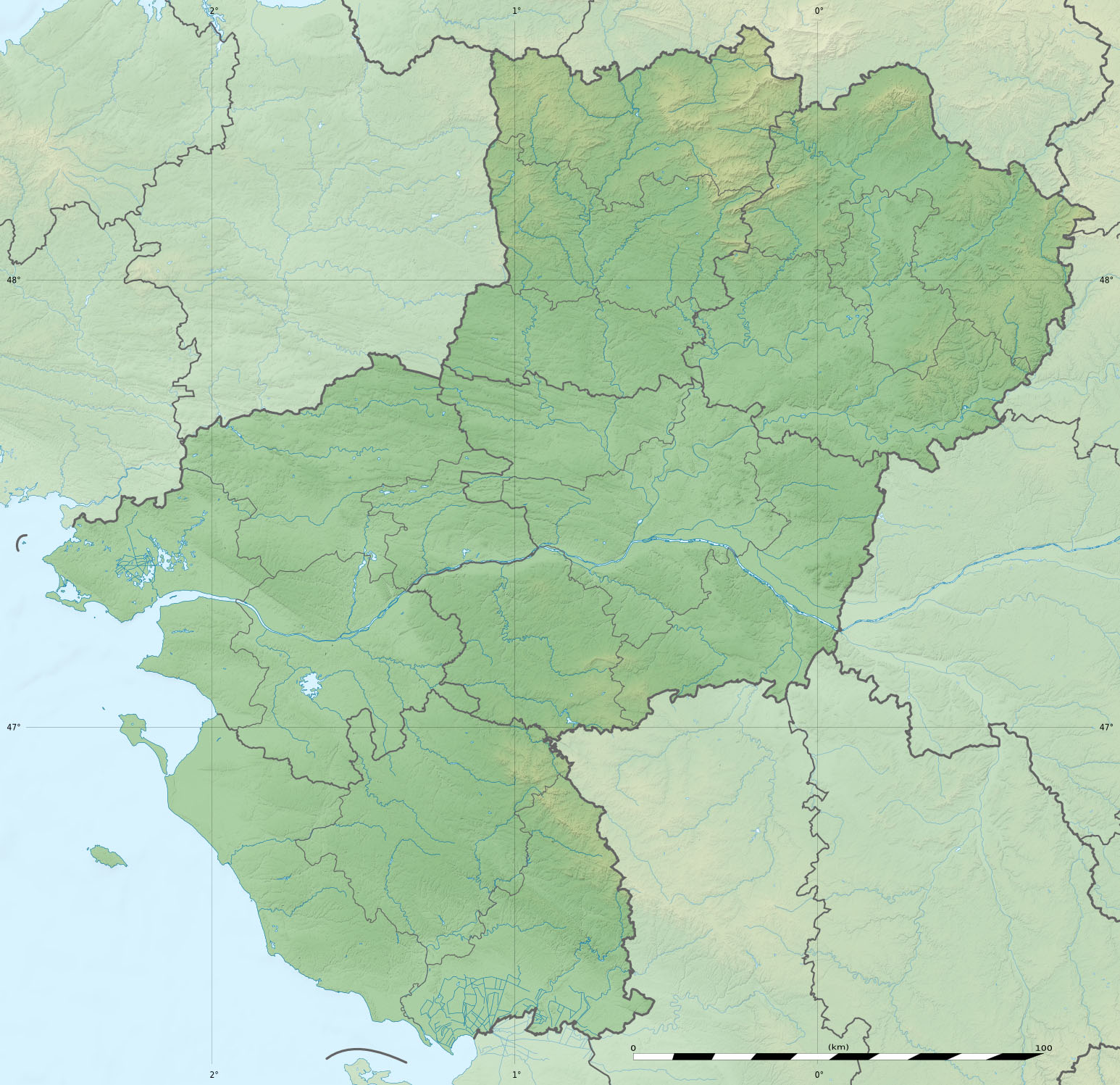
- Location within Pays de la Loire
- Location: Vendée
- Coordinates: 46°44′56″N 1°42′52″W
- Type: reservoir
- Primary inflows: Vie, Petite Boulogne
- Primary outflows: Vie
- Catchment area: 276 km^{2} (107 sq mi)
- Basin countries: France
- Max. length: 8 km (5.0 mi)
- Max. width: 400 m (1,300 ft)
- Surface area: 1.67 km^{2} (0.64 sq mi)
- Water volume: 3.8×10^{6} m^{3} (130×10^{6} cu ft)
- Settlements: Apremont, Aizenay

Lac d'Apremont (or Lac de Retenue de Barrage d'Apremont) is a reservoir in Vendée, France. The reservoir is formed by a gravity dam at Apremont, built in 1966: barrage d'Apremont.
