= Côte de Lumière =

Seaside resorts in France

Coordinates: 46.53°N 1.82°W

The Côte de Lumière (French pronunciation: [kot də lymjɛʁ]; English: Coast of Light) refers to the Atlantic coastline of the Vendée in western France. The region, which gets its name because of its sunny microclimate, is also known for its sandy beaches and seaside resorts.

== Communes ==
Communes situated along the coast south of the Bay of Bourgneuf, include:

- Noirmoutier-en-l'Ile
- Barbâtre
- La Barre-de-Monts
- Notre-Dame-de-Monts
- Saint-Jean-de-Monts
- Saint-Hilaire-de-Riez
- Saint-Gilles-Croix-de-Vie
- Bretignolles-sur-Mer
- Brem-sur-Mer
- Olonne-sur-Mer
- Les Sables d'Olonne
- Château-d'Olonne
- Talmont-Saint-Hilaire
- Jard-sur-Mer
- Saint-Vincent-sur-Jard
- Longeville-sur-Mer
- La Tranche-sur-Mer
- La Faute-sur-Mer (former commune)
