= Château d'Apremont =

Ruined 16th century château Apremont

Coordinates: 46°44′57″N 1°44′29″W

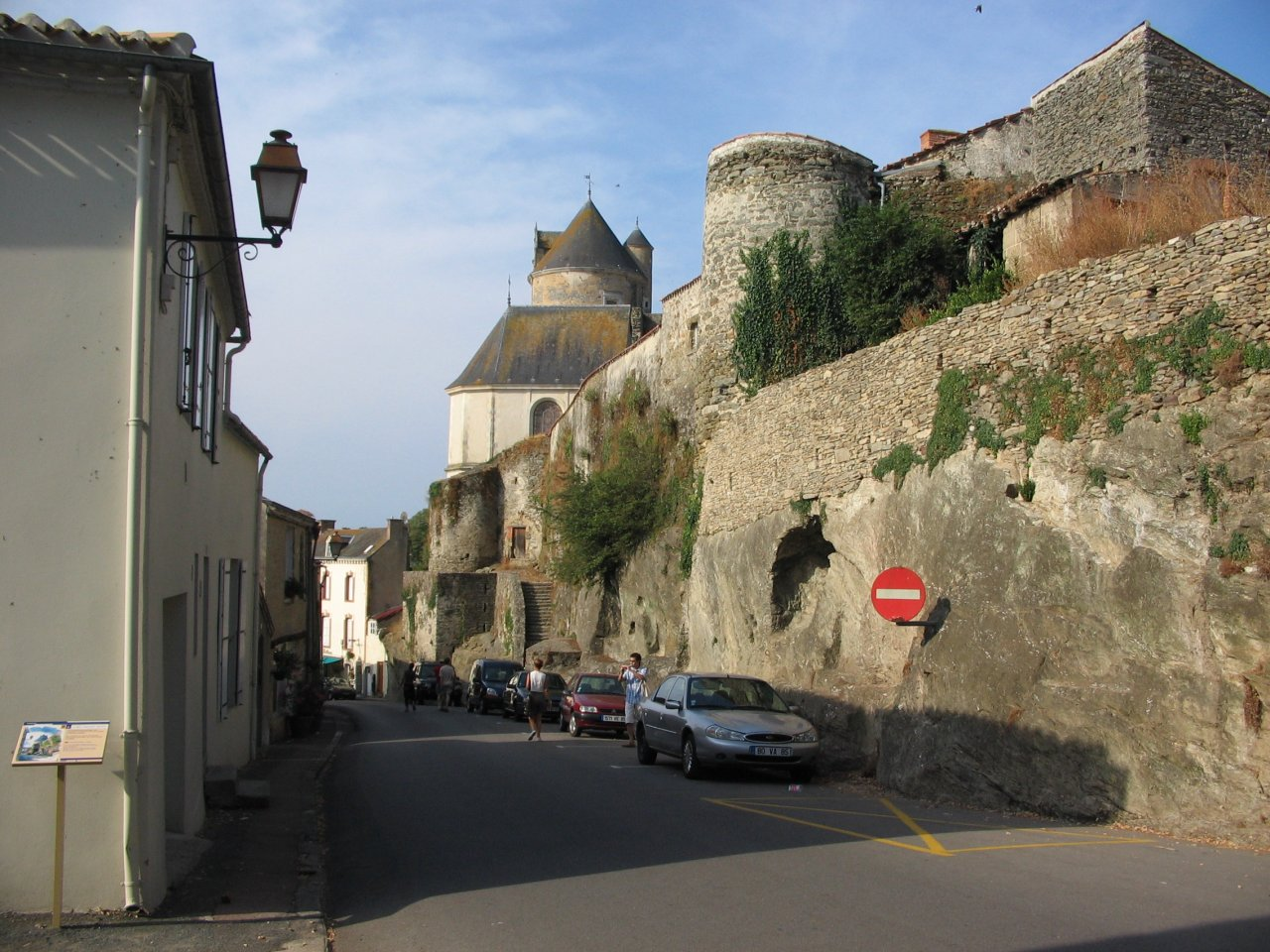
View from Rue Philippe de Chabot, 2006

The Château d'Apremont is a ruined 16th century château in the commune of Apremont in the Vendée département of France.

It was constructed on a promontory overlooking the valley of the Vie. Portions of it are believed to date from the 13th century. The two extant towers were built by Philippe Chabot de Brion in the first half of the 16th century.

This château is one of approximately 300 châteaux of the Loire Valley tour.

The Château d'Apremont is the property of the commune. It has been listed since 1926 as a monument historique by the French Ministry of Culture.
