= Communauté d'agglomération du Pays de Saint-Gilles-Croix-de-Vie =

Pays de Saint-Gilles-Croix-de-Vie
- Communauté d'agglomération
- Interactive map of Pays de Saint-Gilles-Croix-de-Vie
- Coordinates: 46°42′N 01°52′W
- Country: France
- Region: Pays de la Loire
- Department: Vendée
- No. of communes: {{{nbcomm}}}
- Established: 2010
- Area: 292.2 km^{2} (112.8 sq mi)
- Population (2019): 50,311
  - Density: 172.2/km^{2} (445.9/sq mi)
- Website: payssaintgilles.fr

Communauté d'agglomération du Pays de Saint-Gilles-Croix-de-Vie is the communauté d'agglomération, an intercommunal structure, centred on the town of Saint-Gilles-Croix-de-Vie. It is located in the Vendée department, in the Pays de la Loire region, western France. Created in 2010, its seat is in Givrand. Its area is 292.2 km^{2}. Its population was 50,311 in 2019.

== Composition ==
The communauté d'agglomération consists of the following 14 communes:

1. L'Aiguillon-sur-Vie
2. Brem-sur-Mer
3. Bretignolles-sur-Mer
4. La Chaize-Giraud
5. Coëx
6. Commequiers
7. Le Fenouiller
8. Givrand
9. Landevieille
10. Notre-Dame-de-Riez
11. Saint-Gilles-Croix-de-Vie
12. Saint-Hilaire-de-Riez
13. Saint-Maixent-sur-Vie
14. Saint-Révérend
