= Jardin des Olfacties =

Botanical garden

Coordinates: 46.6968°N 1.7628°W

The Jardin des Olfacties (5 hectares) is a botanical garden specializing in scented plants. It is located at the Place de l'Église, Coëx, Vendée, Pays de la Loire, France.

The garden was founded in 1942 as a public park, one hectare in size, and was transformed in the 1990s to become an olfactorium with an emphasis on scented plants, taking its current name in 1998. Between 1998 and 2000 the garden was enlarged to its current size, augmented its botanical collections, and became a member of the Jardins botaniques de France.

Today the garden contains about 3,000 plant taxa arranged into a dozen thematic gardens. It has particular strengths in pelargoniums and roses, and its national collection of carnations has been recognized by the Conservatoire français des collections végétales spécialisées (CCVS).

== Gallery ==
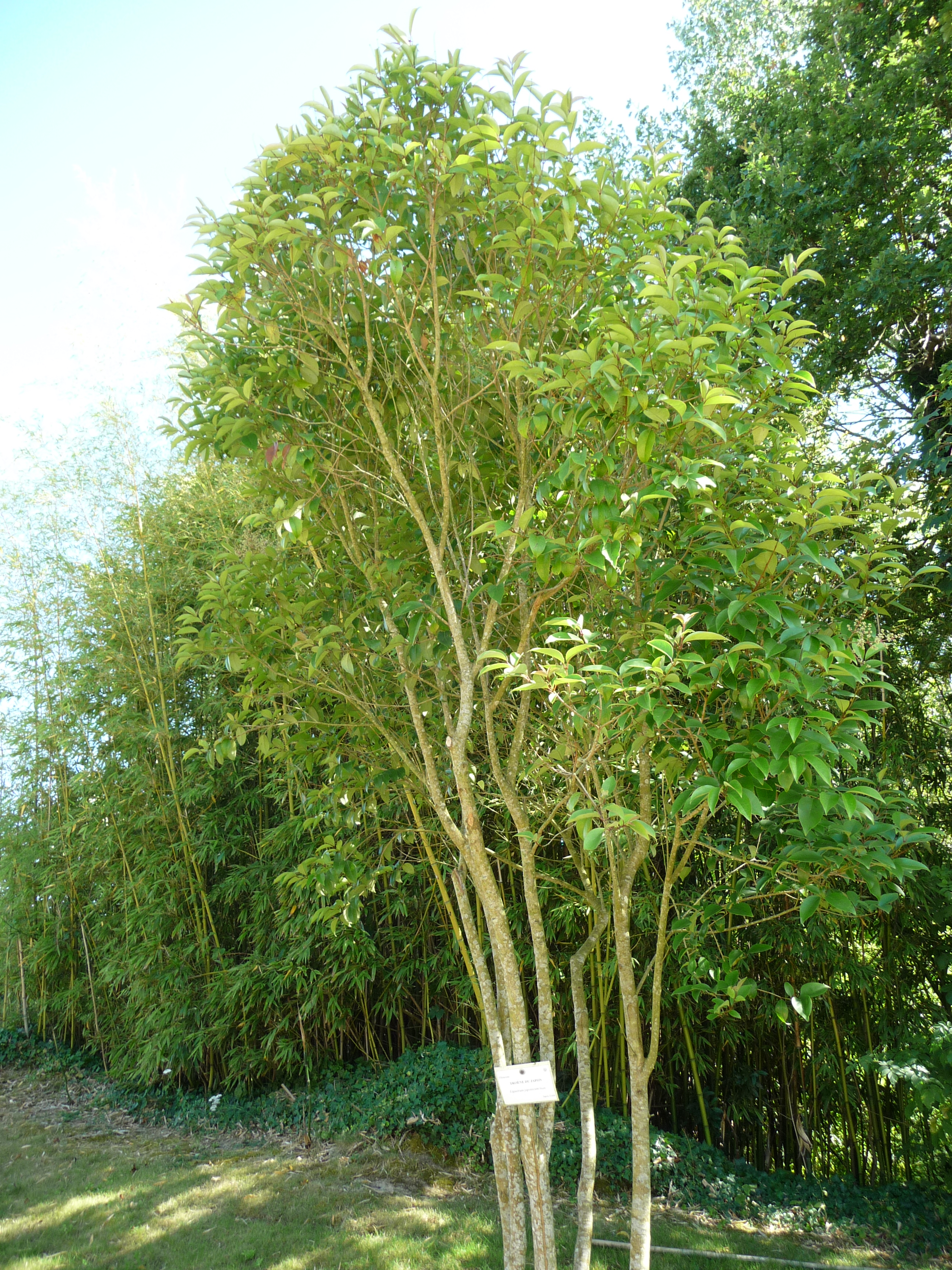
Ligustrum japonicum in Jardin des Olfacties garden, Coëx, Vendée, France

== See also ==
- List of botanical gardens in France
