= Canton of Saint-Hilaire-de-Riez =

Coordinates: 46.72°N 1.95°W

The canton of Saint-Hilaire-de-Riez is an administrative division of the Vendée department, western France, created by the French canton reorganisation which came into effect in March 2015. Its seat is in Saint-Hilaire-de-Riez. It consists of 13 communes:

1. L'Aiguillon-sur-Vie
2. Brem-sur-Mer
3. Bretignolles-sur-Mer
4. La Chaize-Giraud
5. Coëx
6. Commequiers
7. Le Fenouiller
8. Givrand
9. Landevieille
10. Saint-Gilles-Croix-de-Vie
11. Saint-Hilaire-de-Riez
12. Saint-Maixent-sur-Vie
13. Saint-Révérend
