= L'Aiguillon-sur-Vie =

- Commune
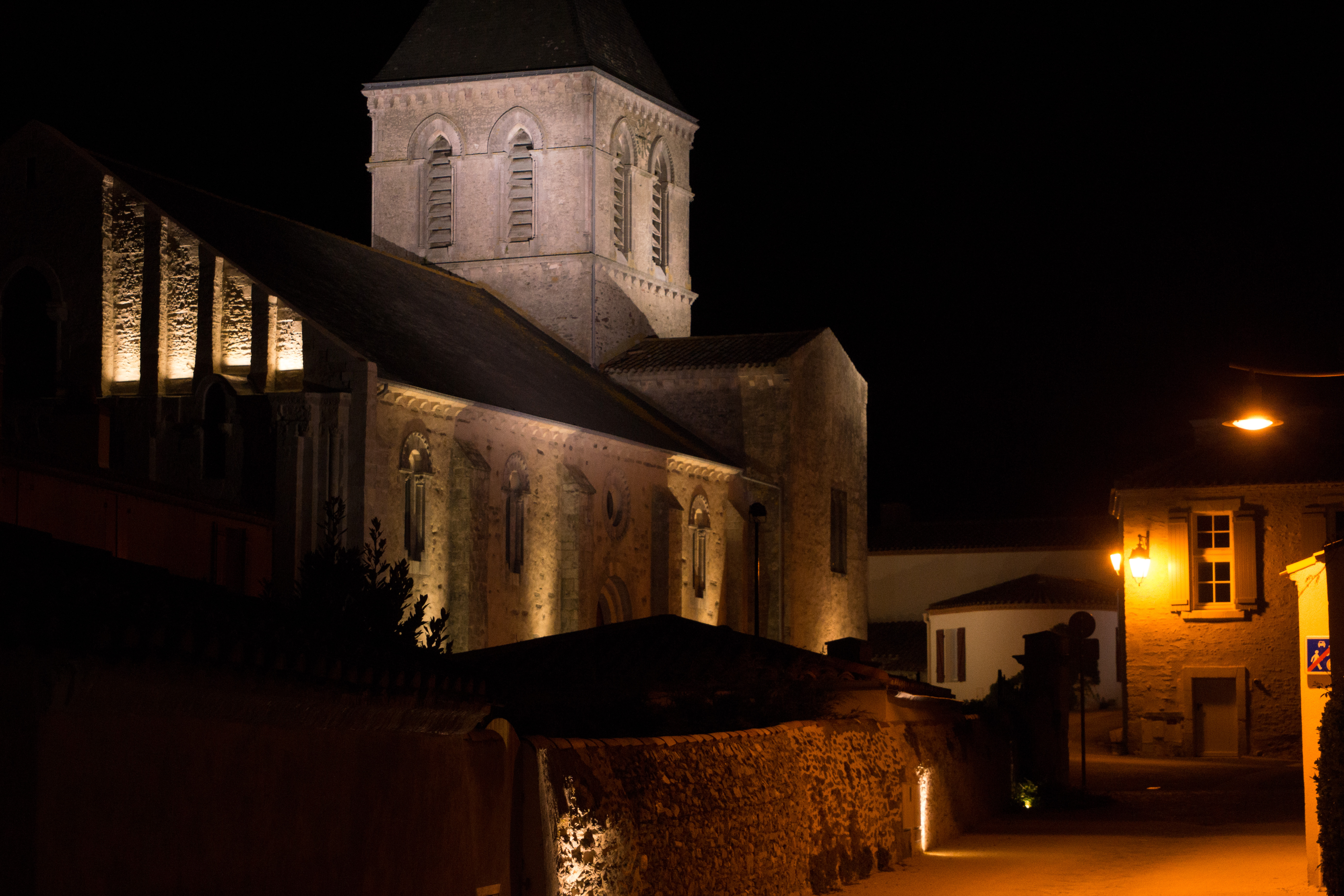
- The 12th century church in L'Aiguillon-sur-Vie
- Location of L'Aiguillon-sur-Vie
- Location within France Location within Pays de la Loire
- Coordinates: 46°40′16″N 1°49′40″W
- Country: France
- Region: Pays de la Loire
- Department: Vendée
- Arrondissement: Les Sables-d'Olonne
- Canton: Saint-Hilaire-de-Riez
- Intercommunality: CA Pays de Saint-Gilles-Croix-de-Vie

Government
  - Mayor (2020–2026): André Coquelin
- Area^{1}: 23.22 km^{2} (8.97 sq mi)
- Elevation: 20 m (66 ft)
- Highest elevation: 49 m (161 ft)
- Lowest elevation: 2 m (6.6 ft)
- Population (2023): 2,277
  - Density: 98.06/km^{2} (254.0/sq mi)
- Time zone: UTC+01:00 (CET)
  - Summer (DST): UTC+02:00 (CEST)
- INSEE/Postal code: 85002 /85220
- ^{1} French Land Register data, which excludes lakes, ponds, glaciers > 1 km^{2} (0.386 sq mi or 247 acres) and river estuaries.

L'Aiguillon-sur-Vie (French pronunciation: [lɛɡɥijɔ̃ syʁ vi], literally L'Aiguillon on Vie) is a commune in the Vendée department in the Pays de la Loire region in western France.

== Population ==
Historical population
Year	Pop.	±% p.a.
1968	975	—
1975	899	−1.15%
1982	956	+0.88%
1990	993	+0.48%
1999	1,109	+1.24%
2007	1,580	+4.52%
2012	1,821	+2.88%
2017	1,965	+1.53%
2023	2,277	+2.49%
Source: INSEE

== See also ==
- Communes of the Vendée department
