= La Chaize-Giraud =

- Commune
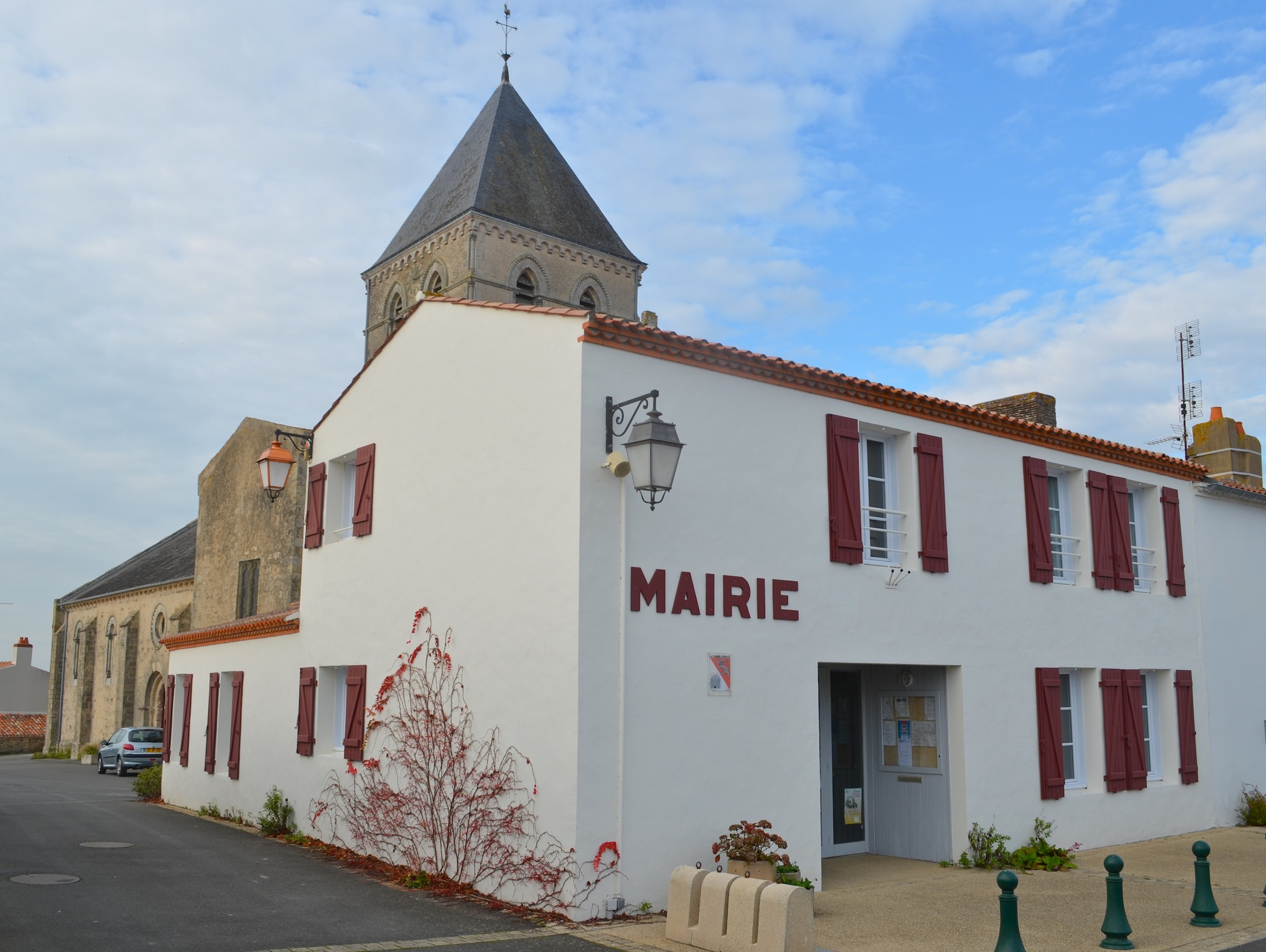
- The town hall, in front of the church of Saint-Nicolas

- Coat of arms
- Location of La Chaize-Giraud
- Location within France Location within Pays de la Loire
- Coordinates: 46°38′55″N 1°48′57″W
- Country: France
- Region: Pays de la Loire
- Department: Vendée
- Arrondissement: Les Sables-d'Olonne
- Canton: Saint-Hilaire-de-Riez
- Intercommunality: CA Pays de Saint-Gilles-Croix-de-Vie

Government
  - Mayor (2020–2026): Jean-François Biron
- Area^{1}: 2.71 km^{2} (1.05 sq mi)
- Highest elevation: 43 m (141 ft)
- Lowest elevation: 2 m (6.6 ft)
- Population (2023): 1,124
  - Density: 415/km^{2} (1,070/sq mi)
- Time zone: UTC+01:00 (CET)
  - Summer (DST): UTC+02:00 (CEST)
- INSEE/Postal code: 85045 /85220
- ^{1} French Land Register data, which excludes lakes, ponds, glaciers > 1 km^{2} (0.386 sq mi or 247 acres) and river estuaries.

La Chaize-Giraud (French pronunciation: [la ʃɛz ʒiʁo]) is a commune in the Vendée department in the Pays de la Loire region in western France.

== See also ==
- Communes of the Vendée department
