= Saint-Maixent-sur-Vie =

- Commune
- Location of Saint-Maixent-sur-Vie
- Location within France Location within Pays de la Loire
- Coordinates: 46°44′28″N 1°49′11″W
- Country: France
- Region: Pays de la Loire
- Department: Vendée
- Arrondissement: Les Sables-d'Olonne
- Canton: Saint-Hilaire-de-Riez
- Intercommunality: CA Pays de Saint-Gilles-Croix-de-Vie

Government
  - Mayor (2020–2026): Jean Soyer
- Area^{1}: 10.71 km^{2} (4.14 sq mi)
- Highest elevation: 37 m (121 ft)
- Lowest elevation: 2 m (6.6 ft)
- Population (2023): 1,234
  - Density: 115.2/km^{2} (298.4/sq mi)
- Time zone: UTC+01:00 (CET)
  - Summer (DST): UTC+02:00 (CEST)
- INSEE/Postal code: 85239 /85220
- ^{1} French Land Register data, which excludes lakes, ponds, glaciers > 1 km^{2} (0.386 sq mi or 247 acres) and river estuaries.

Saint-Maixent-sur-Vie (French pronunciation: [sɛ̃ mɛksɑ̃ syʁ vi], literally Saint-Maixent on Vie) is a commune in the Vendée department in the Pays de la Loire region in western France.

== See also ==
- Communes of the Vendée department
