= Landevieille =

- Commune
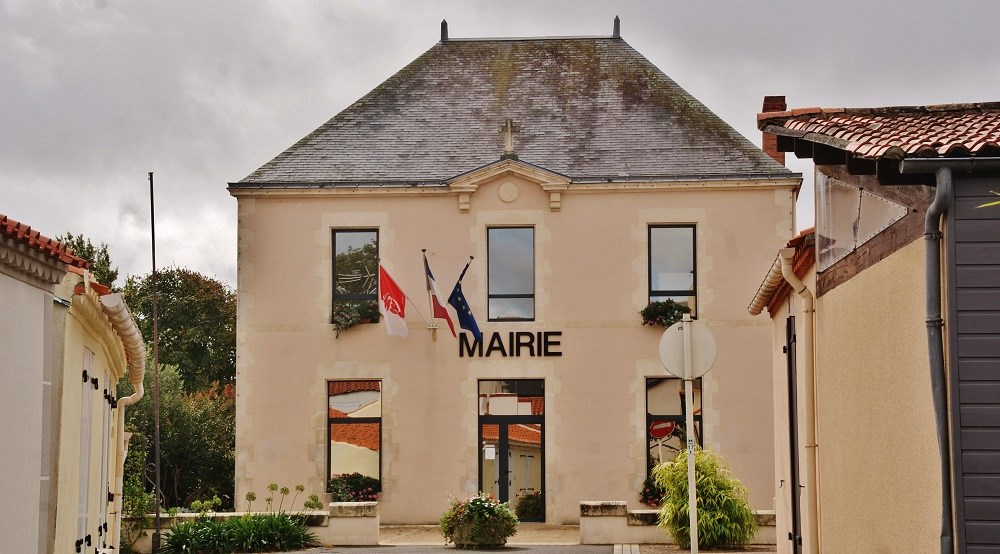
- Town hall of Landevieille
- Location of Landevieille
- Location within France Location within Pays de la Loire
- Coordinates: 46°38′30″N 1°48′18″W
- Country: France
- Region: Pays de la Loire
- Department: Vendée
- Arrondissement: Les Sables-d'Olonne
- Canton: Saint-Hilaire-de-Riez
- Intercommunality: CA Pays de Saint-Gilles-Croix-de-Vie

Government
  - Mayor (2020–2026): Isabelle Duranteau
- Area^{1}: 13.57 km^{2} (5.24 sq mi)
- Highest elevation: 59 m (194 ft)
- Lowest elevation: 2 m (6.6 ft)
- Population (2023): 1,519
  - Density: 111.9/km^{2} (289.9/sq mi)
- Time zone: UTC+01:00 (CET)
  - Summer (DST): UTC+02:00 (CEST)
- INSEE/Postal code: 85120 /85220
- ^{1} French Land Register data, which excludes lakes, ponds, glaciers > 1 km^{2} (0.386 sq mi or 247 acres) and river estuaries.

Landevieille (French pronunciation: [lɑ̃d.vjɛj]) is a commune in the Vendée department in the Pays de la Loire region in western France.

== See also ==
- Communes of the Vendée department
