= Givrand =

- Commune
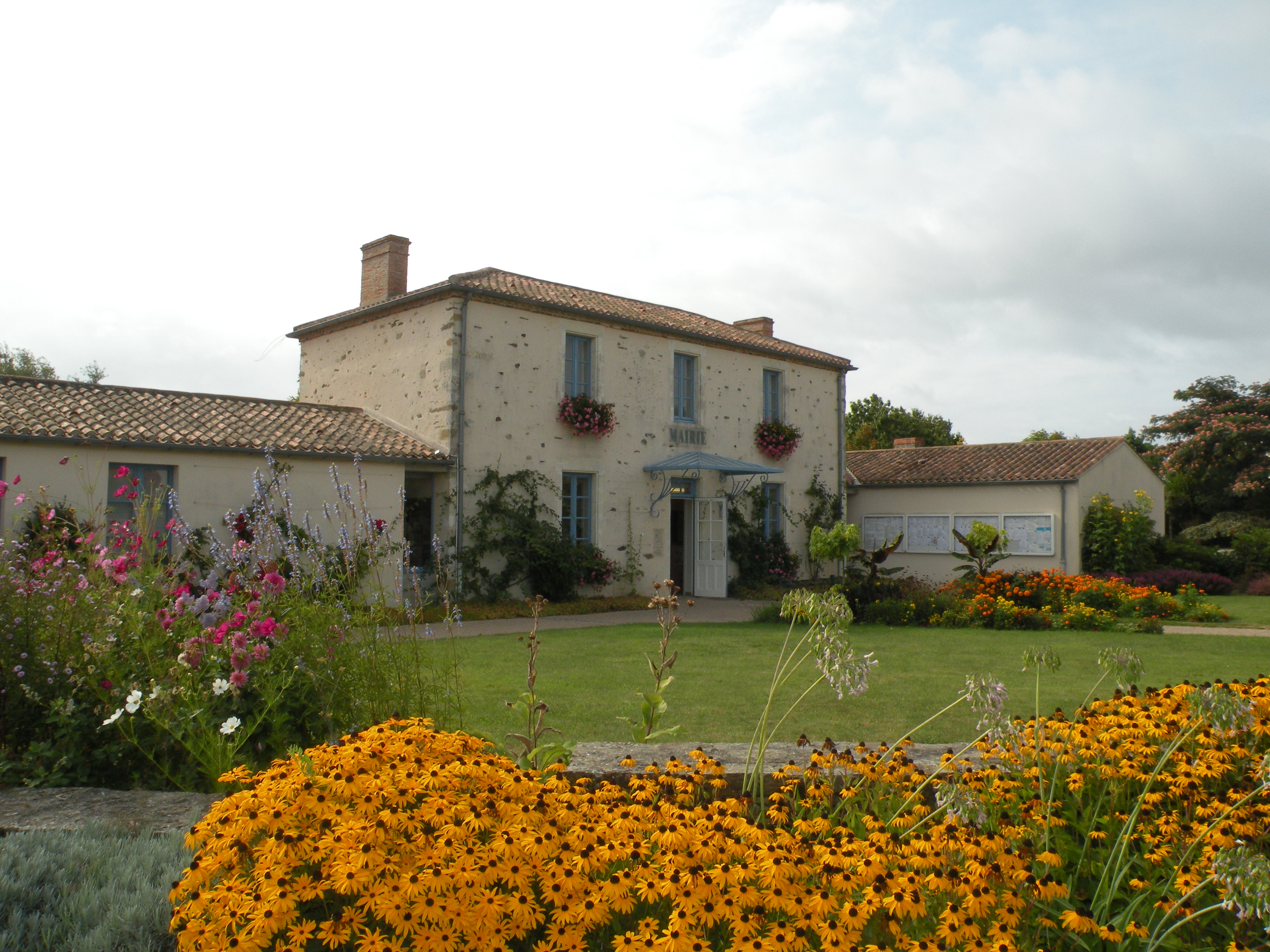
- The town hall of Givrand
- Location of Givrand
- Location within France Location within Pays de la Loire
- Coordinates: 46°40′20″N 1°53′01″W
- Country: France
- Region: Pays de la Loire
- Department: Vendée
- Arrondissement: Les Sables-d'Olonne
- Canton: Saint-Hilaire-de-Riez
- Intercommunality: CA Pays de Saint-Gilles-Croix-de-Vie

Government
  - Mayor (2020–2026): Laurent Duranteau
- Area^{1}: 11.69 km^{2} (4.51 sq mi)
- Highest elevation: 33 m (108 ft)
- Lowest elevation: 2 m (6.6 ft)
- Population (2023): 2,205
  - Density: 188.6/km^{2} (488.5/sq mi)
- Time zone: UTC+01:00 (CET)
  - Summer (DST): UTC+02:00 (CEST)
- INSEE/Postal code: 85100 /85800
- ^{1} French Land Register data, which excludes lakes, ponds, glaciers > 1 km^{2} (0.386 sq mi or 247 acres) and river estuaries.

Givrand (French pronunciation: [ʒivʁɑ̃]) is a commune in the Vendée department in the Pays de la Loire region in western France.

== Population ==
Historical population
Year	Pop.	±% p.a.
1968	456	—
1975	541	+2.47%
1982	708	+3.92%
1990	940	+3.61%
1999	1,309	+3.75%
2007	1,826	+4.25%
2012	2,007	+1.91%
2017	2,176	+1.63%
2023	2,205	+0.22%
Source: INSEE

== See also ==
- Communes of the Vendée department
