= Le Poiré-sur-Vie =

- Commune
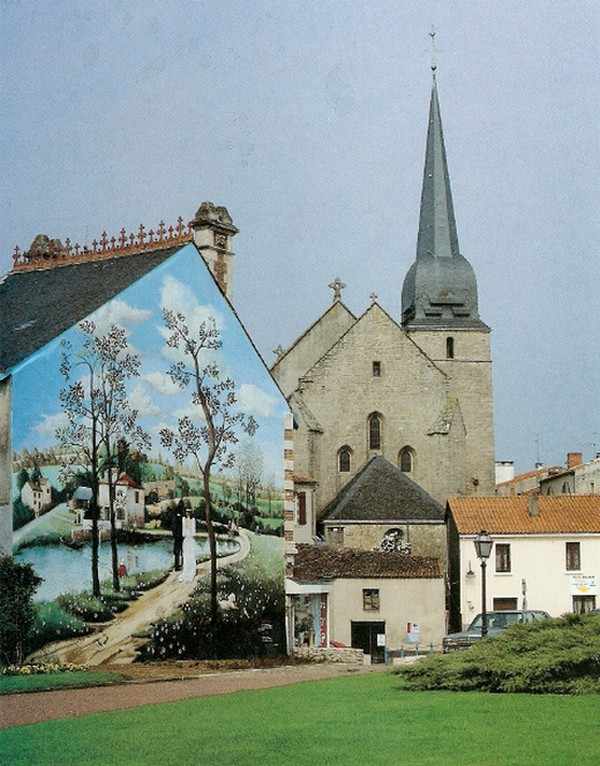
- The church and a mural

- Coat of arms
- Location of Le Poiré-sur-Vie
- Location within France Location within Pays de la Loire
- Coordinates: 46°46′06″N 1°30′35″W
- Country: France
- Region: Pays de la Loire
- Department: Vendée
- Arrondissement: La Roche-sur-Yon
- Canton: Aizenay
- Intercommunality: Vie et Boulogne

Government
  - Mayor (2020–2026): Sabine Roirand
- Area^{1}: 72.95 km^{2} (28.17 sq mi)
- Highest elevation: 83 m (272 ft)
- Lowest elevation: 17 m (56 ft)
- Population (2023): 8,649
  - Density: 118.6/km^{2} (307.1/sq mi)
- Time zone: UTC+01:00 (CET)
  - Summer (DST): UTC+02:00 (CEST)
- INSEE/Postal code: 85178 /85170
- ^{1} French Land Register data, which excludes lakes, ponds, glaciers > 1 km^{2} (0.386 sq mi or 247 acres) and river estuaries.

Le Poiré-sur-Vie (French pronunciation: [lə pwaʁe syʁ vi], literally Le Poiré on Vie) is a commune in the Vendée department in the Pays de la Loire region in western France.

== Population ==
Historical population
Year	Pop.	±% p.a.
1968	3,551	—
1975	3,800	+0.97%
1982	4,904	+3.71%
1990	5,326	+1.04%
1999	5,786	+0.92%
2007	7,206	+2.78%
2012	8,192	+2.60%
2017	8,509	+0.76%
2023	8,649	+0.27%
Source: INSEE

== See also ==
- Communes of the Vendée department
