= Coex (material) =

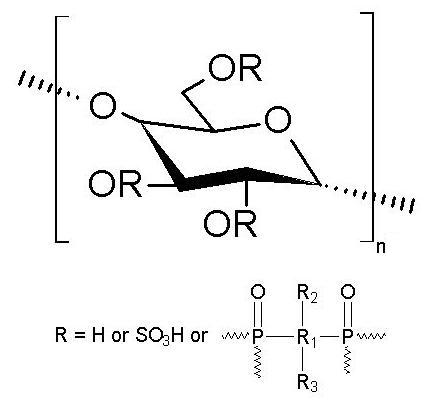
The chemical structure of cellulose with substitutions that characterize coex materials.

Coex is a biopolymer with flame-retardant properties derived from the functionalization of cellulosic fibers such as cotton, linen, jute, cannabis, coconut, ramie, bamboo, raffia palm, stipa, abacà, sisal, nettle and kapok. The formation of coex has been proven possible on wood and semi-synthetic fibers such as cellulose acetate, cellulose triacetate, viscose, modal, lyocell and cupro.

The material is obtained by sulfation and phosphorylation reactions on glucan units linked to each other in position 1,4. Typical reaction locations are on the secondary and tertiary hydroxyl groups of the cellulosic fiber. The chemical modification of the cellulosic fibers does not involve physical and visual alterations compared to the starting material.

in 2015 the World Textile Information Network (WTiN) declared Coex the winner of the "Future Materials Award" as the best innovation in the Home Textile category.

== Properties ==
Coex preserves the physical and chemical characteristics of the raw material from which it is formed. The main features of Coex materials are comfort, hydrophilicity, antistatic properties, mechanical resistance and versatility in the textile sector, like all natural and semi-synthetic cellulosic fibers.

Coex materials are resistant to moths, mildew and sunlight. The flame resistant nature of Coex is unique in that it acts as a barrier to the flames rather than only delaying the spread of fire; the biopolymer fibres carbonize and therefore extinguish the flame. The resulting products are hypoallergenic and biodegradable.
