= Saint-Révérend =

- Commune
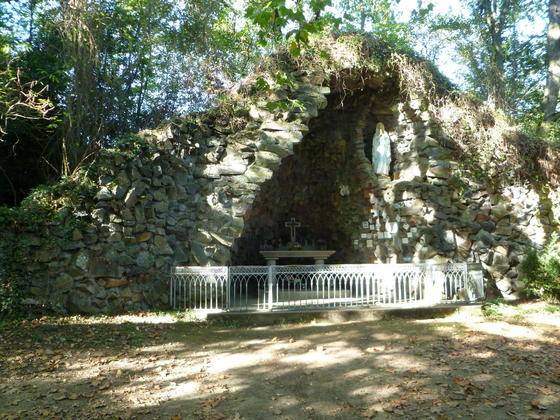
- The grotto in Saint-Révérend
- Location of Saint-Révérend
- Location within France Location within Pays de la Loire
- Coordinates: 46°42′00″N 1°49′41″W
- Country: France
- Region: Pays de la Loire
- Department: Vendée
- Arrondissement: Les Sables-d'Olonne
- Canton: Saint-Hilaire-de-Riez
- Intercommunality: CA Pays de Saint-Gilles-Croix-de-Vie

Government
  - Mayor (2020–2026): Lucien Prince
- Area^{1}: 15.82 km^{2} (6.11 sq mi)
- Highest elevation: 47 m (154 ft)
- Lowest elevation: 2 m (6.6 ft)
- Population (2023): 1,549
  - Density: 97.91/km^{2} (253.6/sq mi)
- Time zone: UTC+01:00 (CET)
  - Summer (DST): UTC+02:00 (CEST)
- INSEE/Postal code: 85268 /85220
- ^{1} French Land Register data, which excludes lakes, ponds, glaciers > 1 km^{2} (0.386 sq mi or 247 acres) and river estuaries.

Saint-Révérend (French pronunciation: [sɛ̃ ʁeveʁɑ̃]) is a commune in the Vendée department in the Pays de la Loire region in western France.

== See also ==
- Communes of the Vendée department
