= Commequiers =

- Commune
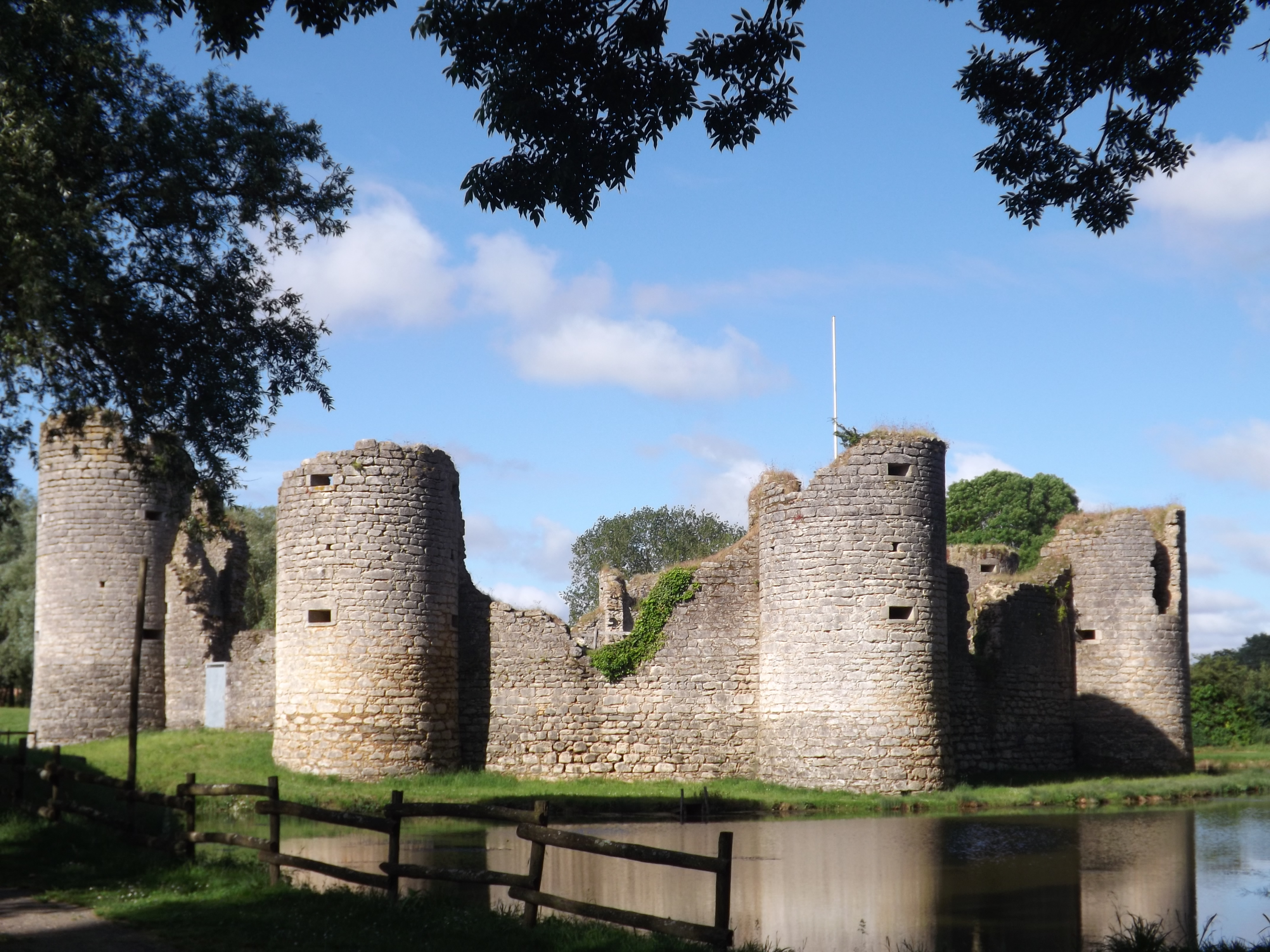
- The Chateau of Commequiers

- Coat of arms
- Location of Commequiers
- Location within France Location within Pays de la Loire
- Coordinates: 46°45′49″N 1°50′09″W
- Country: France
- Region: Pays de la Loire
- Department: Vendée
- Arrondissement: Les Sables-d'Olonne
- Canton: Saint-Hilaire-de-Riez
- Intercommunality: CA Pays de Saint-Gilles-Croix-de-Vie

Government
  - Mayor (2020–2026): Philippe Moreau
- Area^{1}: 40.26 km^{2} (15.54 sq mi)
- Highest elevation: 55 m (180 ft)
- Lowest elevation: 0 m (0 ft)
- Population (2023): 3,735
  - Density: 92.77/km^{2} (240.3/sq mi)
- Time zone: UTC+01:00 (CET)
  - Summer (DST): UTC+02:00 (CEST)
- INSEE/Postal code: 85071 /85220
- ^{1} French Land Register data, which excludes lakes, ponds, glaciers > 1 km^{2} (0.386 sq mi or 247 acres) and river estuaries.

Commequiers (French pronunciation: [kɔmkje]) is a commune of the Vendée department in the Pays de la Loire region in western France.

== Heraldry ==
Commequiers	Coat of arms of Commequiers Blazon: Divided: in the first, party per pale: in the first, or, two keys sable in saltire and in the second, gules, a dolmen argent; in the second, azure, a castle argent, pierced and masoned sable, surmounted by a baron's coronet or.

== Megaliths ==
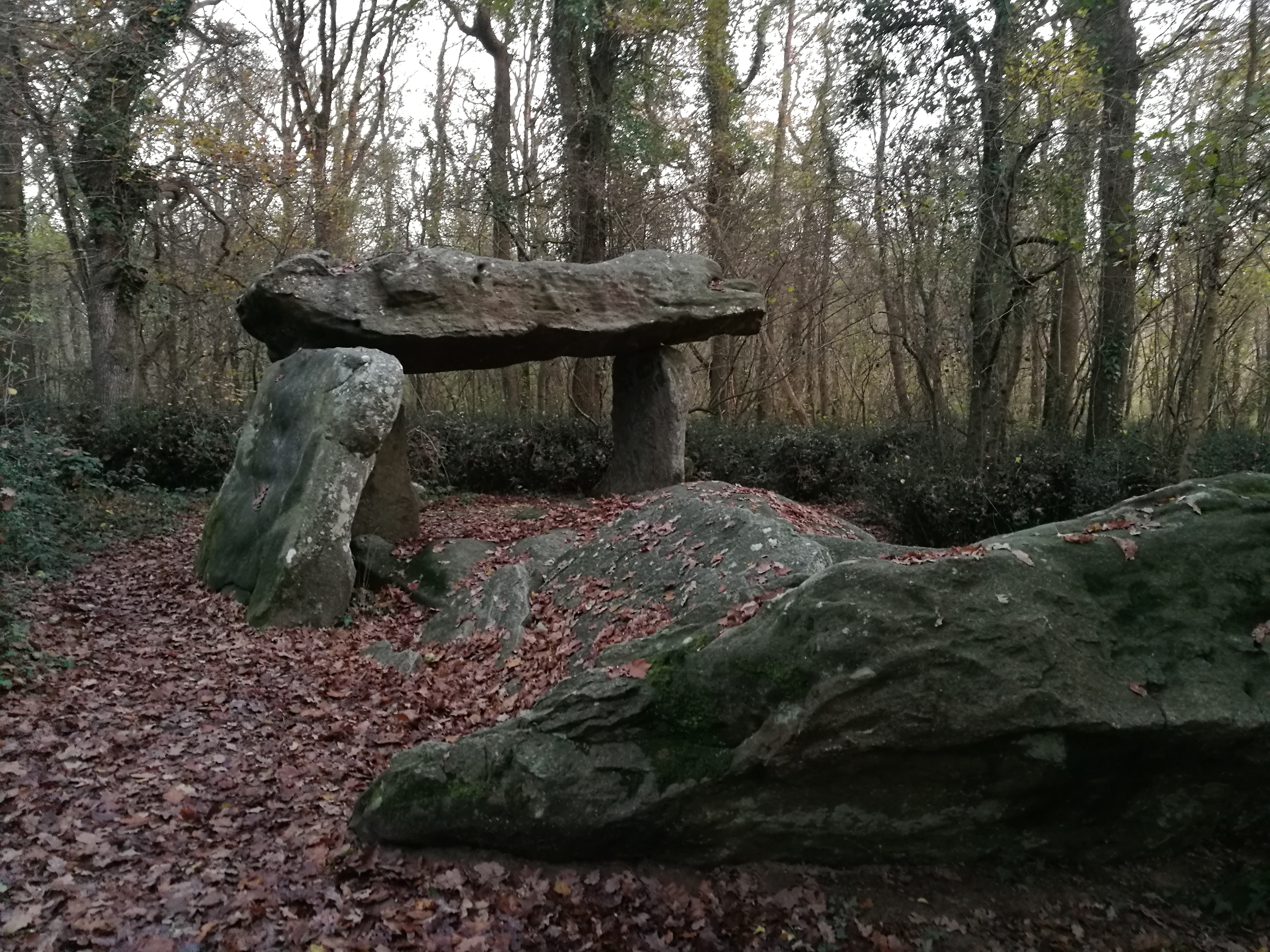
Covered alley of Pierre-Folle

- Allée couverte de la Pierre-Folle, depicted on the commune's coat of arms Classified MH (1929)
- The Grand'Pierre menhir, also called Menhir de la Palissonière Registered MH (1981)

== Population ==
Historical population
Year	Pop.	±% p.a.
1968	1,719	—
1975	1,701	−0.15%
1982	1,862	+1.30%
1990	2,053	+1.23%
1999	2,297	+1.26%
2007	2,686	+1.97%
2012	3,152	+3.25%
2017	3,505	+2.15%
2023	3,735	+1.06%
Source: INSEE

== See also ==
- Communes of the Vendée department
