= Maché =

- Commune
- Coat of arms
- Location of Maché
- Location within France Location within Pays de la Loire
- Coordinates: 46°45′23″N 1°41′06″W
- Country: France
- Region: Pays de la Loire
- Department: Vendée
- Arrondissement: La Roche-sur-Yon
- Canton: Challans
- Intercommunality: Vie-et-Boulogne

Government
  - Mayor (2020–2026): Frédéric Rager
- Area^{1}: 18.13 km^{2} (7.00 sq mi)
- Highest elevation: 62 m (203 ft)
- Lowest elevation: 10 m (33 ft)
- Population (2023): 1,831
  - Density: 101.0/km^{2} (261.6/sq mi)
- Time zone: UTC+01:00 (CET)
  - Summer (DST): UTC+02:00 (CEST)
- INSEE/Postal code: 85130 /85190
- ^{1} French Land Register data, which excludes lakes, ponds, glaciers > 1 km^{2} (0.386 sq mi or 247 acres) and river estuaries.

Maché (French pronunciation: [maʃe]) is a commune in the Vendée department in the Pays de la Loire region in western France.

== Population ==
Historical population
Year	Pop.	±% p.a.
1968	740	—
1975	768	+0.53%
1982	789	+0.39%
1990	899	+1.64%
1999	1,094	+2.21%
2007	1,273	+1.91%
2012	1,303	+0.47%
2017	1,545	+3.47%
2023	1,831	+2.87%
Source: INSEE

== See also ==
- Communes of the Vendée department
