= La Chapelle-Palluau =

- Commune
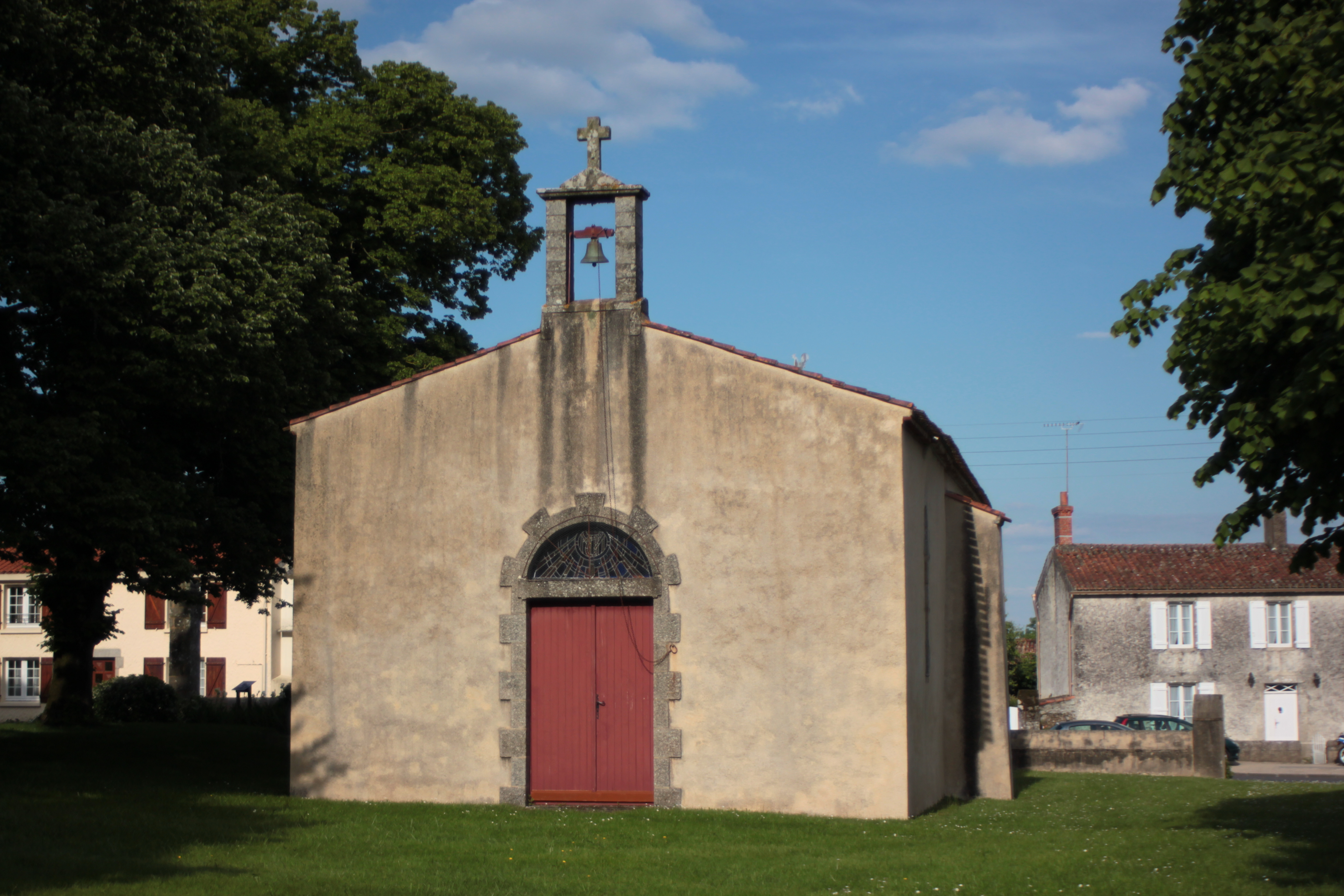
- The Chapel of Our Lady of Mercy, in La Chapelle-Palluau
- Location of La Chapelle-Palluau
- Location within France Location within Pays de la Loire
- Coordinates: 46°47′03″N 1°37′17″W
- Country: France
- Region: Pays de la Loire
- Department: Vendée
- Arrondissement: La Roche-sur-Yon
- Canton: Challans
- Intercommunality: Vie et Boulogne

Government
  - Mayor (2020–2026): Xavier Prouteau
- Area^{1}: 13.01 km^{2} (5.02 sq mi)
- Highest elevation: 64 m (210 ft)
- Lowest elevation: 11 m (36 ft)
- Population (2023): 1,124
  - Density: 86.40/km^{2} (223.8/sq mi)
- Time zone: UTC+01:00 (CET)
  - Summer (DST): UTC+02:00 (CEST)
- INSEE/Postal code: 85055 /85670
- ^{1} French Land Register data, which excludes lakes, ponds, glaciers > 1 km^{2} (0.386 sq mi or 247 acres) and river estuaries.

La Chapelle-Palluau (French pronunciation: [la ʃapɛl palɥo]) is a commune in the Vendée department in the Pays de la Loire region in western France.

== See also ==
- Communes of the Vendée department
