= Brem-sur-Mer =

- Commune
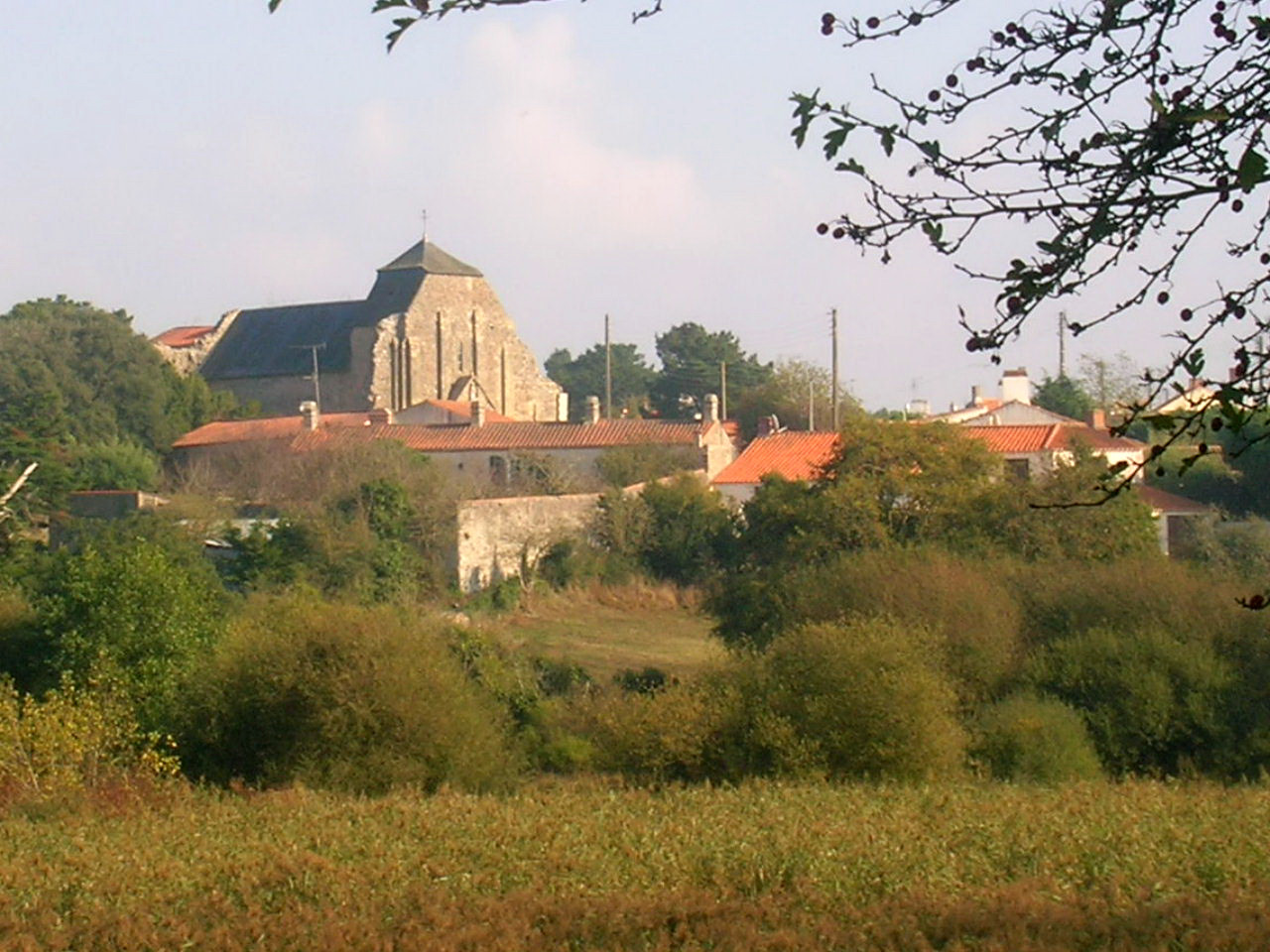
- A general view of the Saint-Nicolas quarter

- Coat of arms
- Location of Brem-sur-Mer
- Location within France Location within Pays de la Loire
- Coordinates: 46°36′19″N 1°49′48″W
- Country: France
- Region: Pays de la Loire
- Department: Vendée
- Arrondissement: Les Sables-d'Olonne
- Canton: Saint-Hilaire-de-Riez
- Intercommunality: CA Pays de Saint-Gilles-Croix-de-Vie

Government
  - Mayor (2020–2026): Yann Thomas
- Area^{1}: 15.85 km^{2} (6.12 sq mi)
- Highest elevation: 55 m (180 ft)
- Lowest elevation: 0 m (0 ft)
- Population (2023): 2,993
  - Density: 188.8/km^{2} (489.1/sq mi)
- Demonym: Bremois
- Time zone: UTC+01:00 (CET)
  - Summer (DST): UTC+02:00 (CEST)
- INSEE/Postal code: 85243 /85470
- Website: www.brem-sur-mer.fr
- ^{1} French Land Register data, which excludes lakes, ponds, glaciers > 1 km^{2} (0.386 sq mi or 247 acres) and river estuaries.

Brem-sur-Mer (French pronunciation: [bʁɛm syʁ mɛʁ]; lit. 'Brem-on-Sea') is a commune in the Vendée department in the Pays de la Loire region in western France.

It was created in 1974 by the merger of the former communes of Saint Martin-de-Brem and Saint Nicolas-de-Brem. Despite being a beach resort on the Atlantic Ocean and taking the name "on Sea", Brem-sur-Mer is not a coastal commune, as the coast is part of neighbouring Bretignolles-sur-Mer. "Brem" is derived in etymology from the Gaulish "bram".

== Demographics ==
Historical population
Year	Pop.	±% p.a.
1968	1,018	—
1975	1,161	+1.90%
1982	1,425	+2.97%
1990	1,709	+2.30%
1999	2,054	+2.06%
2007	2,485	+2.41%
2012	2,599	+0.90%
2017	2,720	+0.91%
2023	2,993	+1.61%
Source: Population in geography as of January 2025, INSEE

== Economy ==
The main activity of the commune is tourism. It has an industrial area with fourteen companies. It is also known for its vineyard, planted during the Middle Ages by monks.

== Twinning ==
Brem-sur-Mer is a twinned with Mammendorf, Germany.

== See also ==
- Communes of the Vendée department
