= Le Fenouiller =

- Commune
- Location of Le Fenouiller
- Location within France Location within Pays de la Loire
- Coordinates: 46°43′13″N 1°53′57″W
- Country: France
- Region: Pays de la Loire
- Department: Vendée
- Arrondissement: Les Sables-d'Olonne
- Canton: Saint-Hilaire-de-Riez
- Intercommunality: CA Pays de Saint-Gilles-Croix-de-Vie

Government
  - Mayor (2020–2026): Isabelle Tessier
- Area^{1}: 17.81 km^{2} (6.88 sq mi)
- Highest elevation: 32 m (105 ft)
- Lowest elevation: 0 m (0 ft)
- Population (2023): 4,978
  - Density: 279.5/km^{2} (723.9/sq mi)
- Time zone: UTC+01:00 (CET)
  - Summer (DST): UTC+02:00 (CEST)
- INSEE/Postal code: 85088 /85800
- ^{1} French Land Register data, which excludes lakes, ponds, glaciers > 1 km^{2} (0.386 sq mi or 247 acres) and river estuaries.

Le Fenouiller (French pronunciation: [lə fənuje]) is a commune in the Vendée department in the Pays de la Loire region in western France.

== Population ==
Historical population
Year	Pop.	±% p.a.
1968	1,280	—
1975	1,449	+1.79%
1982	2,279	+6.68%
1990	2,902	+3.07%
1999	3,213	+1.14%
2007	4,107	+3.12%
2012	4,377	+1.28%
2017	4,711	+1.48%
2023	4,978	+0.92%
Source: INSEE

== See also ==
- Communes of the Vendée department
