= Apremont, Vendée =

Apremont
- Commune
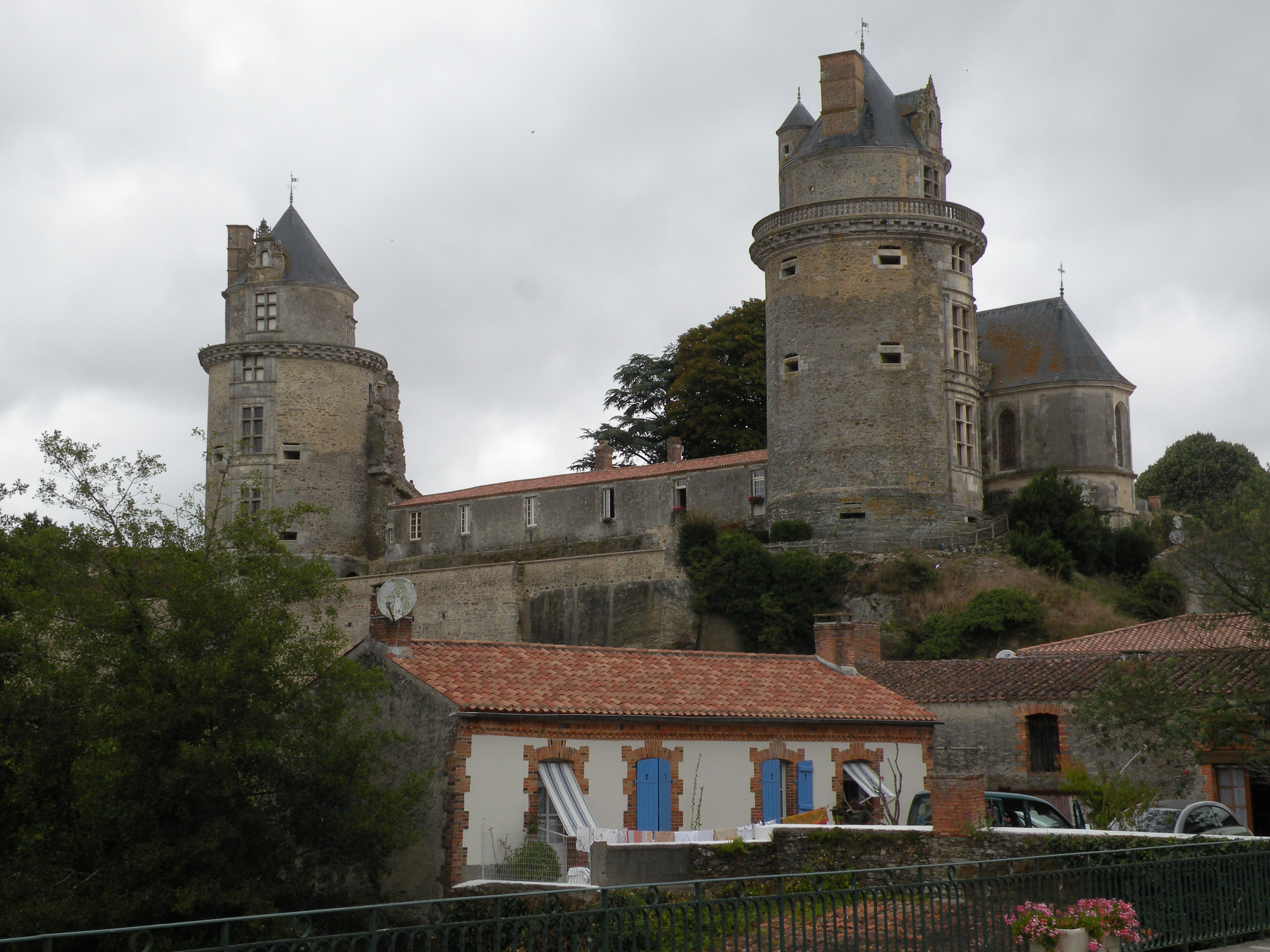
- The Château of Apremont

- Coat of arms
- Location of Apremont
- Location within France Location within Pays de la Loire
- Coordinates: 46°45′03″N 1°44′23″W
- Country: France
- Region: Pays de la Loire
- Department: Vendée
- Arrondissement: La Roche-sur-Yon
- Canton: Challans

Government
  - Mayor (2020–2026): Gaëlle Champion
- Area^{1}: 29.73 km^{2} (11.48 sq mi)
- Highest elevation: 58 m (190 ft)
- Lowest elevation: 2 m (6.6 ft)
- Population (2023): 2,108
  - Density: 70.90/km^{2} (183.6/sq mi)
- Time zone: UTC+01:00 (CET)
  - Summer (DST): UTC+02:00 (CEST)
- INSEE/Postal code: 85006 /85220
- Website: www.apremont85.fr
- ^{1} French Land Register data, which excludes lakes, ponds, glaciers > 1 km^{2} (0.386 sq mi or 247 acres) and river estuaries.

Apremont (French pronunciation: [apʁəmɔ̃]) is a commune in the Vendée department in the Pays de la Loire region in western France.

Lac d'Apremont is formed by the Apremont dam at the town.

== Demography ==
Historical population
Year	Pop.	±% p.a.
1968	1,146	—
1975	1,109	−0.47%
1982	1,131	+0.28%
1990	1,152	+0.23%
1999	1,119	−0.32%
2007	1,374	+2.60%
2012	1,695	+4.29%
2017	1,814	+1.37%
2023	2,108	+2.54%
Source: INSEE

== See also ==
- Communes of the Vendée department
