= Notre-Dame-de-Riez =

- Commune
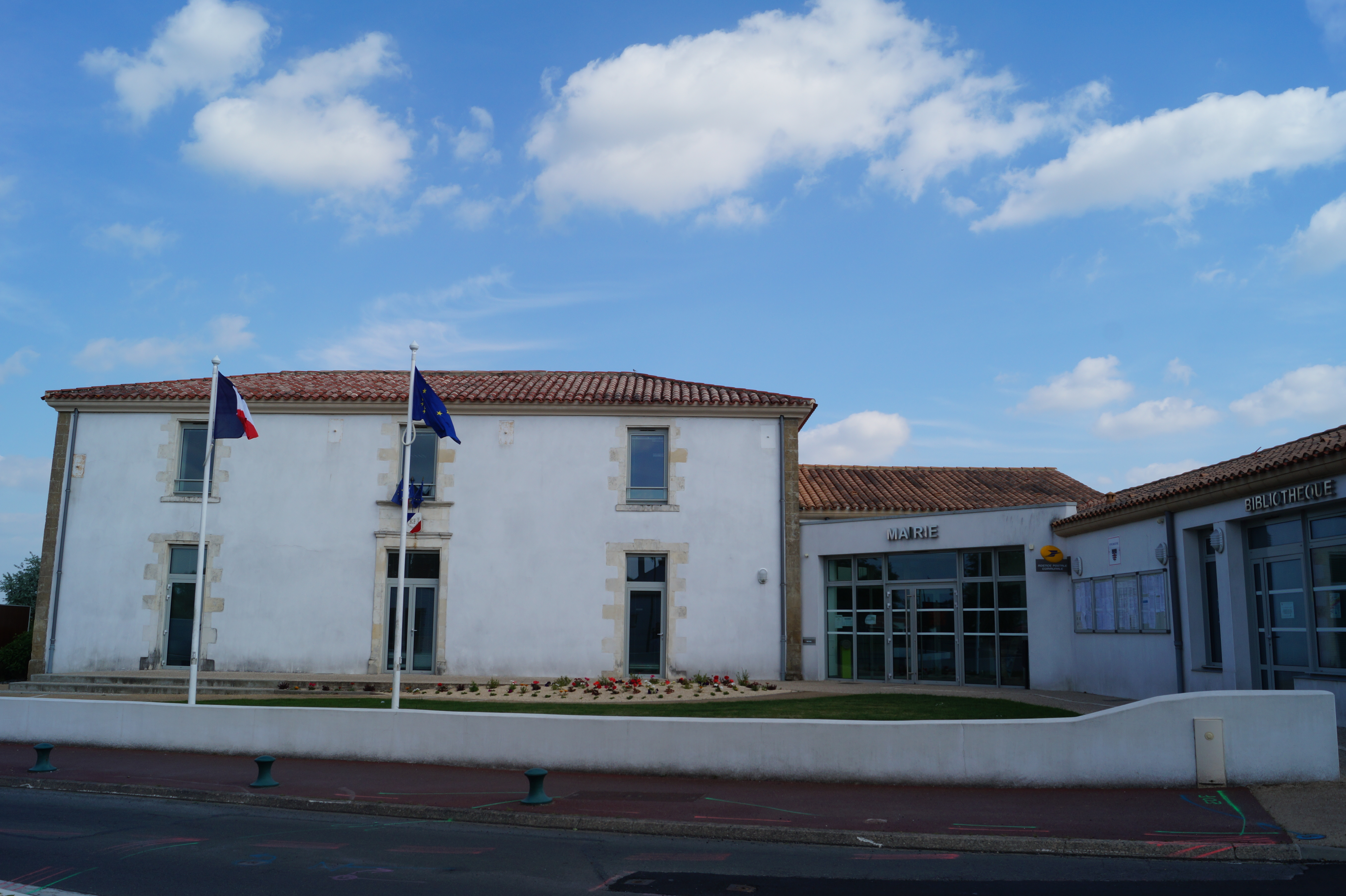
- Town hall of Notre-Dame-de-Riez

- Coat of arms
- Location of Notre-Dame-de-Riez
- Location within France Location within Pays de la Loire
- Coordinates: 46°44′46″N 1°54′22″W
- Country: France
- Region: Pays de la Loire
- Department: Vendée
- Arrondissement: Les Sables-d'Olonne
- Canton: Saint-Jean-de-Monts
- Intercommunality: CA Pays de Saint-Gilles-Croix-de-Vie

Government
  - Mayor (2020–2026): Hervé Bessonnet
- Area^{1}: 14.62 km^{2} (5.64 sq mi)
- Highest elevation: 19 m (62 ft)
- Lowest elevation: 0 m (0 ft)
- Population (2023): 2,213
  - Density: 151.4/km^{2} (392.0/sq mi)
- Time zone: UTC+01:00 (CET)
  - Summer (DST): UTC+02:00 (CEST)
- INSEE/Postal code: 85189 /85270
- ^{1} French Land Register data, which excludes lakes, ponds, glaciers > 1 km^{2} (0.386 sq mi or 247 acres) and river estuaries.

Notre-Dame-de-Riez (French pronunciation: [nɔtʁ dam də ʁje]) is a commune in the Vendée department in the Pays de la Loire region in western France.

== Population ==
Historical population
Year	Pop.	±% p.a.
1968	650	—
1975	713	+1.33%
1982	922	+3.74%
1990	957	+0.47%
1999	1,211	+2.65%
2007	1,805	+5.12%
2012	1,957	+1.63%
2017	2,099	+1.41%
2023	2,213	+0.89%
Source: INSEE

== See also ==
- Communes of the Vendée department
