= Saint-Hilaire-de-Riez =

- Commune
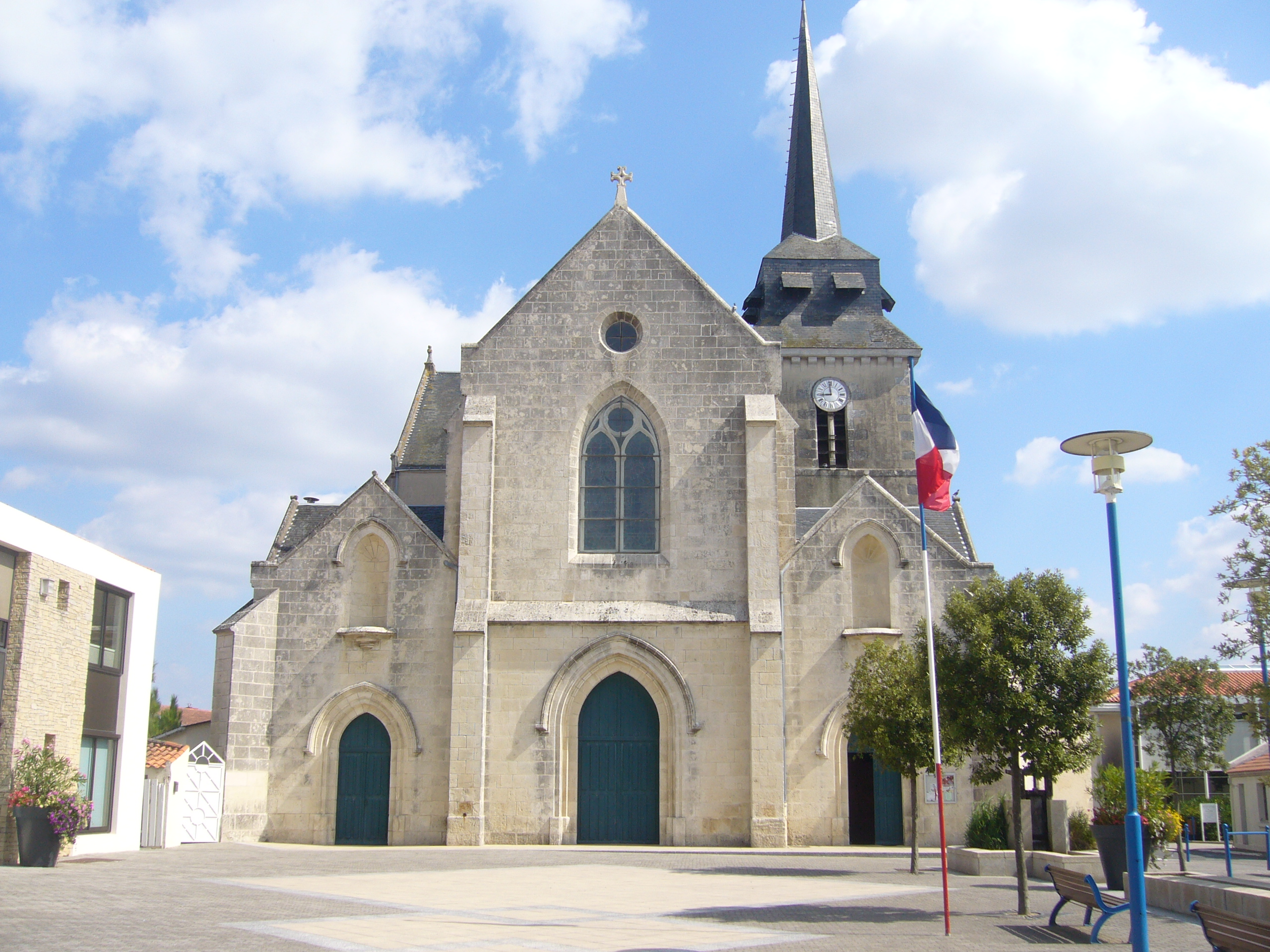
- The church in Saint-Hilaire-de-Riez

- Coat of arms
- Location of Saint-Hilaire-de-Riez
- Location within France Location within Pays de la Loire
- Coordinates: 46°43′19″N 1°56′39″W
- Country: France
- Region: Pays de la Loire
- Department: Vendée
- Arrondissement: Les Sables-d'Olonne
- Canton: Saint-Hilaire-de-Riez
- Intercommunality: CA Pays de Saint-Gilles-Croix-de-Vie

Government
  - Mayor (2020–2026): Kathia Viel
- Area^{1}: 48.85 km^{2} (18.86 sq mi)
- Elevation: 10 m (33 ft)
- Highest elevation: 33 m (108 ft)
- Lowest elevation: 0 m (0 ft)
- Population (2023): 13,074
  - Density: 267.6/km^{2} (693.2/sq mi)
- Time zone: UTC+01:00 (CET)
  - Summer (DST): UTC+02:00 (CEST)
- INSEE/Postal code: 85226 /85270
- ^{1} French Land Register data, which excludes lakes, ponds, glaciers > 1 km^{2} (0.386 sq mi or 247 acres) and river estuaries.

Saint-Hilaire-de-Riez (French pronunciation: [sɛ̃.t‿ilɛʁ də ʁje]) is a commune in the Vendée department, administrative region of Pays de la Loire, western France. Saint-Hilaire-de-Riez station has rail connections to Saint-Gilles-Croix-de-Vie and Nantes.

== Population ==
Historical population
| Year | Pop. | ±% p.a. |
|---|---|---|
| 1968 | 4,339 | — |
| 1975 | 5,028 | +2.13% |
| 1982 | 6,041 | +2.66% |
| 1990 | 7,416 | +2.60% |
| 1999 | 8,761 | +1.87% |
| 2007 | 10,248 | +1.98% |
| 2012 | 10,823 | +1.10% |
| 2017 | 11,169 | +0.63% |
| 2023 | 13,074 | +2.66% |
Source: INSEE

== See also ==
- Communes of the Vendée department
