= Bretignolles-sur-Mer =

- Commune
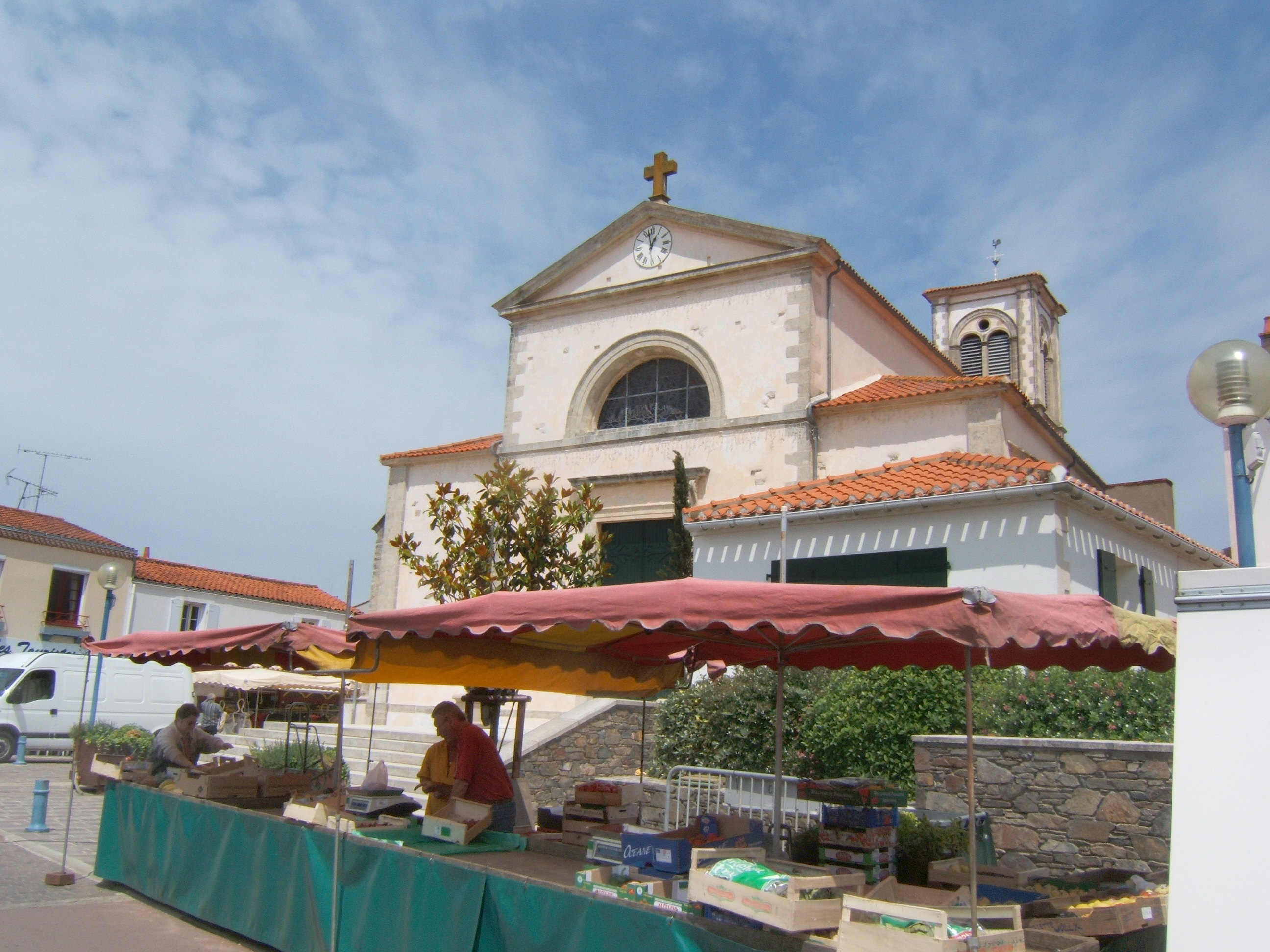
- The church and the square, with the market

- Coat of arms
- Location of Bretignolles-sur-Mer
- Location within France Location within Pays de la Loire
- Coordinates: 46°37′43″N 1°51′14″W
- Country: France
- Region: Pays de la Loire
- Department: Vendée
- Arrondissement: Les Sables-d'Olonne
- Canton: Saint-Hilaire-de-Riez
- Intercommunality: CA Pays de Saint-Gilles-Croix-de-Vie

Government
  - Mayor (2020–2026): Frédéric Fouquet
- Area^{1}: 27.32 km^{2} (10.55 sq mi)
- Highest elevation: 38 m (125 ft)
- Lowest elevation: 0 m (0 ft)
- Population (2023): 5,344
  - Density: 195.6/km^{2} (506.6/sq mi)
- Demonym: Bretignollais/Brétignollais
- Time zone: UTC+01:00 (CET)
  - Summer (DST): UTC+02:00 (CEST)
- INSEE/Postal code: 85035 /85470
- Website: www.bretignolles-sur-mer.fr
- ^{1} French Land Register data, which excludes lakes, ponds, glaciers > 1 km^{2} (0.386 sq mi or 247 acres) and river estuaries.

Bretignolles-sur-Mer (French pronunciation: [bʁetiɲɔl syʁ mɛʁ]; lit. 'Bretignolles-on-Sea'; also spelled Brétignolles-sur-Mer) is a commune in the Vendée department in the Pays de la Loire region in western France. It is on the Atlantic Ocean, up the coast from Les Sables-d'Olonne.

== Population ==
Historical population
Year	Pop.	±% p.a.
1968	1,534	—
1975	1,920	+3.26%
1982	2,029	+0.79%
1990	2,165	+0.81%
1999	2,686	+2.42%
2007	3,673	+3.99%
2012	4,256	+2.99%
2017	4,669	+1.87%
2023	5,344	+2.28%
Source: INSEE

== See also ==
- Communes of the Vendée department
