= Coëx =

- Commune
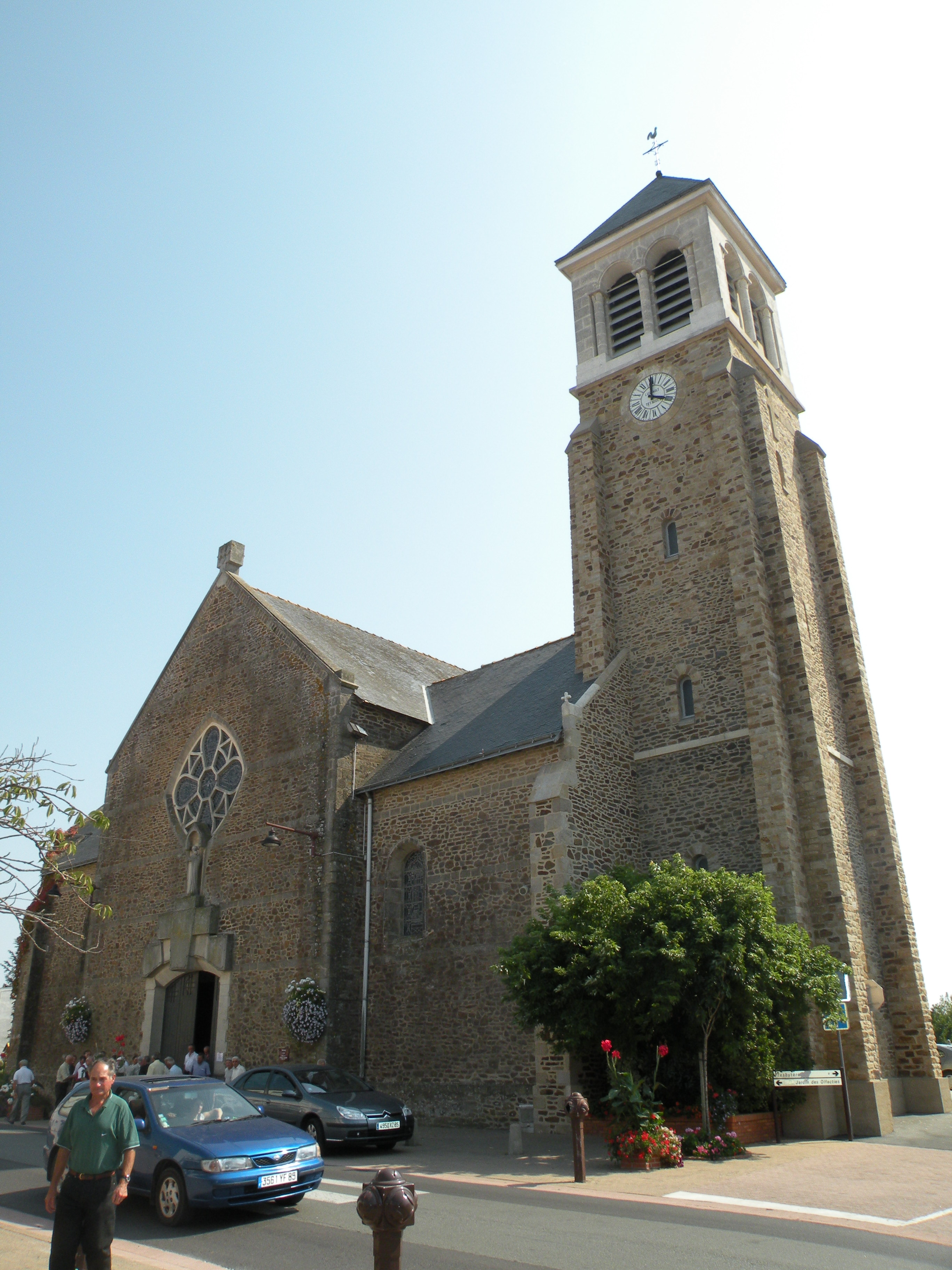
- The church of Our Lady of the Assumption

- Coat of arms
- Location of Coëx
- Location within France Location within Pays de la Loire
- Coordinates: 46°41′55″N 1°45′34″W
- Country: France
- Region: Pays de la Loire
- Department: Vendée
- Arrondissement: Les Sables-d'Olonne
- Canton: Saint-Hilaire-de-Riez
- Intercommunality: CA Pays de Saint-Gilles-Croix-de-Vie

Government
  - Mayor (2021–2026): Thierry Favreau
- Area^{1}: 39.56 km^{2} (15.27 sq mi)
- Highest elevation: 61 m (200 ft)
- Lowest elevation: 2 m (6.6 ft)
- Population (2023): 3,428
  - Density: 86.65/km^{2} (224.4/sq mi)
- Time zone: UTC+01:00 (CET)
  - Summer (DST): UTC+02:00 (CEST)
- INSEE/Postal code: 85070 /85220
- ^{1} French Land Register data, which excludes lakes, ponds, glaciers > 1 km^{2} (0.386 sq mi or 247 acres) and river estuaries.

Coëx (French pronunciation: [kɔɛks]) is a commune of the Vendée department in the Pays de la Loire region in western France. The organist Joseph Joubert (1878–1963) was born in Coëx.

== Population ==
Historical population
Year	Pop.	±% p.a.
1968	2,005	—
1975	2,193	+1.29%
1982	2,239	+0.30%
1990	2,283	+0.24%
1999	2,418	+0.64%
2007	2,944	+2.49%
2012	3,123	+1.19%
2017	3,176	+0.34%
2023	3,428	+1.28%
Source: INSEE

== Points of interest ==
- Jardin des Olfacties

== See also ==
- Communes of the Vendée department
