= Karma (2026 film) =

2026 film by Guillaume Canet

- French promotional poster
- Directed by: Guillaume Canet
- Written by: Guillaume Canet; Simon Jacquet
- Starring: Marion Cotillard; Leonardo Sbaraglia; Denis Ménochet; Luis Zahera
- Cinematography: Benoît Debie
- Edited by: Laure Gardette
- Music by: Yodelice
- Production companies: Iconoclast; Caneo Films; Pathé; M6 Films
- Distributed by: Pathé
- Release dates: 15 May 2026 (Cannes); 21 October 2026 (France)
- Running time: 149 minutes
- Country: France
- Language: French

Karma is a 2026 French psychological thriller film directed by Guillaume Canet from a screenplay he co-wrote with Simon Jacquet. It stars Marion Cotillard, Leonardo Sbaraglia, Luis Zahera and Denis Ménochet.

The film had its world premiere out of competition at the 2026 Cannes Film Festival on 15 May. It was followed by its theatrical release in France by Pathé on 21 October.

== Plot ==
In a village in northern Spain, Jeanne tries to rebuild her life with Daniel, who knows nothing about her troubled past. One day, Mateo, Jeanne's six-year-old godson, mysteriously disappears. In order to escape the police who quickly suspect her, Jeanne takes refuge in France in a religious community where she was born and which she fled a few years earlier. Daniel does not believe in the guilt of the woman he loves and will do everything he can to find her before the police do.

— Pathé

== Cast ==
- Marion Cotillard as Jeanne
- Leonardo Sbaraglia as Daniel
- Denis Ménochet as Marc
- Luis Zahera as Vasquez

== Production ==
=== Development ===
On 16 January 2025, it was announced that Marion Cotillard would star in Guillaume Canet's upcoming thriller, Karma, produced by Iconoclast, marking their ninth collaboration and the sixth time that Canet directed Cotillard (following Little White Lies (2010), Blood Ties (2013), Rock'n Roll (2017), Little White Lies 2 (2019), and Asterix & Obelix: The Middle Kingdom (2023)), but no info was given on the plot. On 5 February 2025, it was announced that the film would be a psychological thriller. Canet wrote the film for Cotillard after telling her that he wanted to write "a very strong character" for her and something different from what she had done before.

Actors Leonardo Sbaraglia and Luis Zahera joined the cast on 24 February 2025. On 28 April 2025, Deadline reported that Denis Ménochet had been cast in the film. Mark Ruffalo was initially linked to the film by the Catalan press, but ultimately was confirmed to have no involvement. Plot was still kept under wraps, but it was also reported that Canet co-wrote the screenplay with Simon Jacquet, and that Benoît Debie was hired as the director of photography and Laure Gardette as the editor. The score was composed by Yodelice.

On 25 November 2025, the first still from the film featuring Cotillard with a bruised face on a dark hallway was unveiled along with the official plot.

=== Filming ===
Principal photography began in El Port de la Selva in Catalonia, Spain on 24 February 2025. Filming also took place in La Selva de Mar. Filming locations in France included the communes of Saint-Céré and Saint-Médard-de-Presque in Occitania, and Beaulieu-sur-Dordogne, Corrèze in Nouvelle-Aquitaine. On 28 May 2025, Canet announced that shooting had wrapped.

Karma marks the last time that Canet and Cotillard worked in a film together as a couple. On 27 June 2025, a month after shooting had wrapped, they announced their separation in a joint statement to French news agency Agence France-Presse, saying that they made the separation public "to avoid all speculation, rumors and risky interpretations," and that they decided to separate after 18 years together by "mutual agreement" and with "mutual goodwill".

== Release ==
The film had its world premiere out of competition at the 2026 Cannes Film Festival on 15 May, where it earned a six-minute standing ovation at the end of its screening. It was released theatrically in France by Pathé on 21 October 2026.

== Reception ==
=== Critical response ===
Rotten Tomatoes gives the film a score of 60% based on 10 reviews, with a weighted average of 6.50/10. AlloCiné, a French cinema site, gave the film an average rating of 3/5, based on a survey of 30 French reviews.

Pete Hammond of Deadline billed Karma as "a one to see", a film successfully navigating between arthouse and commercial prospects, otherwise featuring Cotillard in one of "the most intense roles of her career".

Richard Lawson of The Hollywood Reporter deemed the film to be "plenty engaging throughout", despite logic-straining flaws in its world design.

=== Box office ===
In France, Karma was released in 506 theaters and sold 362,971 admissions during its first week of release, including previews, ranking third at the box office. The film sold 232,581 admissions in its second week, bringing its cumulative total to 595,552 admissions and remaining in third place. In its third week, it drew a further 219,356 admissions, bringing its cumulative total to 814,908 admissions and ranking second at the box office.
