= Blood Ties (2013 film) =

2013 film by Guillaume Canet

- Film poster
- Directed by: Guillaume Canet
- Written by: Guillaume Canet; James Gray
- Based on: Les liens du sang by; Jacques Maillot; Pierre Chosson; Eric Veniard; Deux frères: flic & truand by; Michel Papet; Bruno Papet
- Produced by: Alain Attal; Hugo Sélignac; John Lesher; Christopher Woodrow
- Starring: Clive Owen; Billy Crudup; Marion Cotillard; Mila Kunis; Zoe Saldaña; Matthias Schoenaerts; James Caan
- Cinematography: Christophe Offenstein
- Edited by: Hervé de Luze
- Music by: Raphaël Hamburger
- Production companies: Les Productions du Trésor; Caneo Films; Worldview Entertainment; Le Grisbi Productions
- Distributed by: Mars Distribution (France); Lionsgate; Roadside Attractions (United States)
- Release dates: May 20, 2013 (Cannes); October 30, 2013 (France); March 21, 2014 (United States)
- Running time: 144 minutes (France); 127 minutes (United States)
- Countries: France; United States
- Language: English
- Budget: $25 million
- Box office: $2.5 million

Blood Ties is a 2013 crime thriller film directed by Guillaume Canet and starring Clive Owen, Billy Crudup, Marion Cotillard, Mila Kunis and Matthias Schoenaerts. It is a remake of the 2008 French thriller film Les liens du sang by Jacques Maillot, an adaptation of the French novel Deux frères: flic & truand by Bruno and Michel Papet. The screenplay was written by Canet and James Gray. The film was selected to be screened out of competition at the 2013 Cannes Film Festival. The film is a co-production between France and the United States. It was released in France by Mars Distribution on October 30, 2013, and by Roadside Attractions in the United States on March 21, 2014.

== Plot ==
In 1974, Chris Pierzynski is furloughed from prison after serving twelve years for murdering a rapist and killer he caught in the act, and moves in with his brother Frank, who is a New York Police detective. Chris reconnects with his ex-wife Monica, who has become a drug-addicted prostitute. They have a son and a daughter. Their sister Marie, and their sick father Leon, want Chris and Frank to just get along with each other.

When arresting Anthony Scarfo at his house, Frank happens to see his ex-girlfriend Vanessa. Though Vanessa cares for Anthony and bears his child, Frank and Vanessa get back together, infuriating Anthony, who is by then incarcerated.

Chris tries to go straight but faces setbacks. He wants money, in part to take care of his new girlfriend Natalie, the office manager at the garage at which he works, so falls back into crime. Frank is forced to cover for him and kicks him out. The two fistfight, with Chris prevailing and ominously saying "I may see you on Friday" when he leaves.

That Friday, Frank and fellow officers are at the scene of a horrific armored car robbery and multiple murders. Chris is involved and Frank is conflicted, shooting his brother in the shoulder but letting him escape, then resigning from the police department.

Chris begins to build a small criminal empire. After Anthony is released from police custody, his first act is to seek revenge against Frank for destroying his home life. Chris uncovers the plot and must decide between saving his own skin and stopping Anthony in his tracks.

== Cast ==
- Clive Owen as Chris Pierzynski
- Billy Crudup as Detective Frank Pierzynski
- Marion Cotillard as Monica D'Amato
- Mila Kunis as Natalie
- Zoe Saldaña as Vanessa
- Matthias Schoenaerts as Anthony Scarfo
- James Caan as Leon Pierzynski
- Noah Emmerich as Lieutenant Connellan
- Lili Taylor as Marie Pierzynski
- Mark Mahoney as Mr. Ruby
- Charlie Tahan as Michael Pierzynski
- Domenick Lombardozzi as Mike
- Mark Mahoney as Louis
- Jamie Hector as Detective Nick
- John Ventimiglia as Detective Valenti
- Griffin Dunne as McNally
- Eve Hewson as Yvonne
- Daisy Tahan as Robin Pierzynski
- Olek Krupa as Tommy
- Yul Vazquez as Fabio De Soto

== Production ==
The film is a co-production between France and the United States. It was produced by the French companies Les Productions du Trésor, LGM Cinéma, Chi-Fou-Mi Productions, France 2 Cinéma, Caneo Films, Mars Films, and Wild Bunch International along with the American companies Worldview Entertainment and Le Grisbi Productions.

Filming started on May 3, 2012, in Woodmere, New York. The first pictures of the set surfaced on May 12, 2012. Lionsgate UK acquired the UK rights.

=== Casting ===
On March 15, 2012, it was announced that Clive Owen and Billy Crudup would star in Blood Ties, playing two brothers with Mila Kunis and Zoe Saldaña as love interests and Marion Cotillard as an ex-lover. Austin Williams played a younger version of Owen's character.

== Release ==
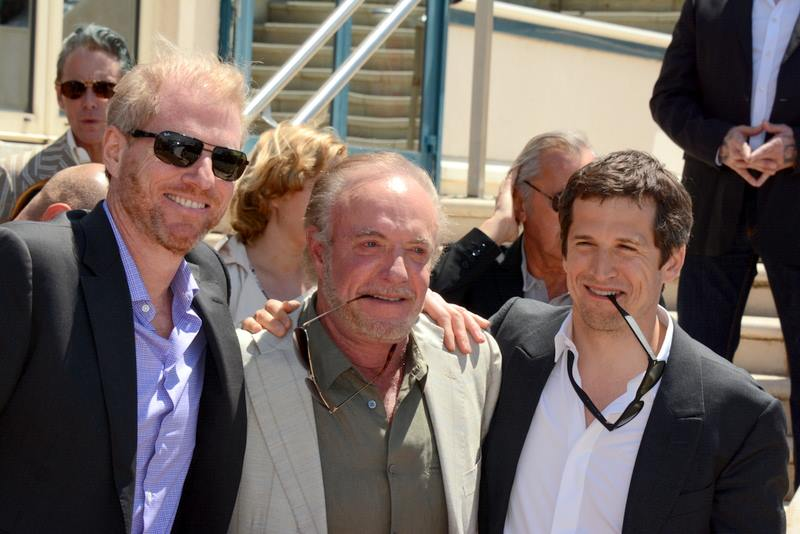
Noah Emmerich, James Caan and Guillaume Canet promoting the film at the 2013 Cannes Film Festival.

Blood Ties screened out of competition at the 2013 Cannes Film Festival. It was released in France on October 30, 2013. A trimmed version, running 127 minutes, was released in the United States on March 21, 2014.

== Home media ==
The 127-minute version was released on DVD in June 2014.

== Reception ==
=== Box office ===
In the United States, it was released by Roadside Attractions and made $42,472 over two weekends in limited release. In France, it had only 238,823 entries, although it was screened in more than 400 theaters in the country. Blood Ties grossed $2.5 million worldwide.

=== Critical response ===
Blood Ties received mixed reviews. On review aggregate website Rotten Tomatoes, the film holds an approval rate of 54%, based on 54 reviews, with an average score of 5.60/10. The website's critics consensus reads: "Blood Ties boasts a fine cast and palpable period detail, but ultimately fails to do much of anything new with its formulaic story." Metacritic gave the film a rating of 45/100 (indicating "mixed or average"), based on reviews from 16 critics.

Todd McCarthy of The Hollywood Reporter criticized the film, saying: "The impressive cast makes this French-financed New York 1974-set production watchable, but it's too inert to catch on with critics or audiences." Xan Brooks of The Guardian gave the film 3 out of 5 stars. Matt Barone of Complex gave the film 3 out of 10 stars. Fionnuala Halligan of Screen International called it "Heat meets Mesrine via Cain and Abel". Ryland Aldrich of Twitch Film praised the production. "From the wonderfully decorated exteriors loaded with the cars of the era to the record players spinning classic hits, 1970s New York absolutely comes alive," he said.
