= Les Liens du sang =

Les Liens du sang may refer to:

- Rivals (2008 French film), a French film known as Les Liens du sang in French
- Bad Blood (TV series), a 2017 Canadian TV series known as Les liens du sang in French

== See also ==
- Blood Relatives (1978 film), a 1978 Canadian-French mystery film known as Les liens de sang in French
