= Élise Tielrooy =

French actress

- Born: 7 May 1967 (age 57); France
- Occupation: Actress
- Years active: 1992–present

Élise Tielrooy (born 7 May 1967) is a French actress of film, stage and television.

== Theater ==
Year	Title	Author	Director	Notes
1992	Suite royale	Francis Huster	Francis Huster	Théâtre Marigny
2000	A Streetcar Named Desire	Tennessee Williams	Philippe Adrien	Théâtre des Célestins

== Filmography ==
Year	Title	Role	Director	Notes
1992	Télécommandes	The woman	James Huth	Short
1993	Les ténors	The TV woman	Francis de Gueltzl	
1993	Illusions fatales		Patrick Malakian	Short
1993	Big Dream	The woman	James Huth (2)	Short
1993	Ascension Express		Nicolas Ribowski	TV movie
1993	Une famille formidable	Ingrid	Joël Santoni	TV series (1 episode)
1995	Les filles du Lido		Jean Sagols	TV mini-series
1996	Hercule et Sherlock	Pauline	Jeannot Szwarc	
1996	La rançon du chien	Sophie's friend	Peter Kassovitz	TV movie
1996	Tous les hommes sont menteurs	Iris Galland	Alain Wermus	TV movie
1996	Les Steenfort, maîtres de l'orge	Joanna Texel	Jean-Daniel Verhaeghe	TV mini-series
1996	L'histoire du samedi	Geneviéve	Françoise Decaux-Thomelet	TV series (1 episode)
1996	Cancoon		Jean Sagols (2)	TV series (1 episode)
1997	Barracuda	The blond	Philippe Haïm	
1997	L'amour à l'ombre	Isabelle	Philippe Venault	TV movie
1997	Les arnaqueuses	Schula	Thierry Binisti	TV movie
1997	Les enfants du Karoo		Laurent Ferrier	TV movie
1997	Sud lointain	Madeleine	Thierry Chabert	TV mini-series
1997	Combats de femme	Christine	Nicolas Cuche	TV series (1 episode)
1998	Paparazzi	Bénédicte	Alain Berbérian	
1998	Serial Lover	Alice Doste	James Huth (3)	
1998	Un amour de cousine	Cora	Pierre Joassin	TV movie
1998	H	The psychologist	Édouard Molinaro	TV series (1 episode)
1999	Mort d'un conquérant	Vicky Felton	Thierry Chabert (2)	TV movie
1999	Vertiges	Lola	Patrick Malakian (2)	TV series (1 episode)
1999	Chambre n° 13	The woman	Nicolas Cuche (2)	TV series (1 episode)
2001	The Officers' Ward	Nurse Cécile	François Dupeyron	
2001	À bicyclette	Anne	Merzak Allouache	TV movie
2001	Un couple modèle	Flora	Charlotte Brandström	TV movie
2001	Tel épris	Catherine	Fabien Onteniente	TV movie
2001	Vertiges	Julia	Alain Robak	TV series (1 episode)
2002	Quelqu'un de bien	Elisabeth	Patrick Timsit	
2002	Un petit Parisien	Dora	Sébastien Grall	TV movie
2002	Double Flair	Juliette Ceyssac	Denis Malleval	TV movie
2002	La vie comme elle vient	Barbara	Edwin Baily	TV movie
2002	Regards d'enfance	Éliane Bardin	Philippe Bérenger	TV series (1 episode)
2003	Toutes les filles sont folles	The psy	Pascale Pouzadoux	
2003	Je tourne avec Almodovar	Inès	Jean-Philippe Amar	Short
2003	Un grain de beauté	The first comedian	Odile Abergel	Short
2003	Faux frères, vrais jumeaux	Eva	Daniel Losset	TV movie
2004	Joe Pollox et les mauvais esprits	Margot	Jérôme Foulon	TV movie
2004	Vive mon entreprise	Corinne	Daniel Losset (2)	TV movie
2005	Lucia	Jolanda	Pasquale Pozzessere	TV movie
2005	La bonne copine	Chloé	Nicolas Cuche (3)	TV movie
2006	Au secours, les enfants reviennent !	Juliette Ducatteau	Thierry Binisti (2)	TV movie
2007	Sempre vivu !	Carole	Robin Renucci	
2007	La prophétie d'Avignon	Nadine Esperanza	David Delrieux	TV mini-series
2009	La double inconstance	Lisette	Carole Giacobbi	TV movie
2009–15	Mes amis, mes amours, mes emmerdes	Marie	Jérôme Navarro, Sylvie Ayme, ...	TV series (24 episodes)
2011	Comme Chez Soi	Cécile	Lorenzo Gabriele	TV movie
2011	Le bon samaritain	Josy Moreno	Bruno Garcia	TV movie
2014	Crimes et botanique	Fabienne	Lorenzo Gabriele (2)	TV series (1 episode)
2016	Paris Can Wait	Martine	Eleanor Coppola	
2018	Section de recherches			TV series
