= Philippe Lefebvre (actor) =

French actor and screenwriter

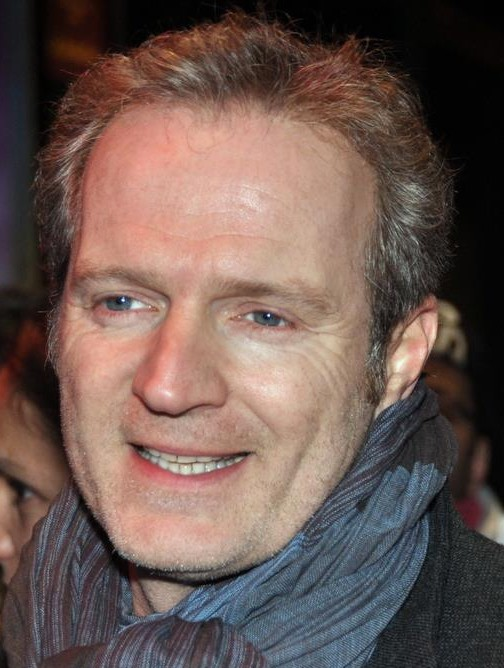
Lefebvre (12 February 2013)

Philippe Lefebvre (born 17 December 1968) is a French actor and screenwriter. He performed in more than fifty films since 1981.

== Career ==
Lefebvre is the son of Chantal and Gérard Lefebvre, and grew up in Loos-lès-Lille with his two brothers. He took acting classes at the Conservatoire de Lille and the Atelier Steve Kalfa.

His cinema career began in 1997 with a role in Barracuda alongside Guillaume Canet, and appeared regularly in TV series. He took a principal role in the series Détectives in 2013, and played the father of an adolescent accused of rape in Un fils in 2015.

As a screenwriter Lefebvre co-authored the script of Ne le dis à personne, Mon idole and Rock'n Roll, all three with Canet. In 2010 he directed his first film Le Siffleur, avec François Berléand. He was the co-founder Alain Attal of the Les Productions du Trésor, which produces short films.

Lefebvre has an extensive filmography, working on The Judge (1984) as director and writer, and Antoine Rives, juge de terrorisme (1993) directing five episodes. He also directed an episode of C’est votre historie in 2007 and directed and wrote the screenplay for Une suit (2012).

Lefebvre worked as the music mixer on the film, Rabid Grannies. Music Mixers are tasked with making the original music in the film (provided by Jean-Bruno Castelain and Pierre-Damien Castelain) sound professional. This can be achieved by simply adjusting the volume of different musical elements of the score. However, it can quickly become more complex depending on the type of music used. This is his only music mixing credit.

He was nominated for the César Award for Best Adaptation for Ne le dis à personne in 2007.

== Selected filmography ==
Film
Year	Title	Role	Notes
2002	Mon Idole	Philippe Letzger	
2004	Narco	The gym teacher	
2006	OSS 117: Cairo, Nest of Spies	Jack Jefferson	
2006	Tell No One	Lieutenant Philippe Meynard	
2007	Game of Four	Damien	
2011	Les Tuche	Bickard	
2011	Comme Chez Soi	Marc	
2011	My Piece of the Pie	Manager at the party	
2013	Turning Tide	Raphaël Keriou	
2016	Back to Mom's	Nicolas Mazerin	
2016	Marseille	CTC Director	
2017	Rock'n Roll	Philippe Lefebvre	Also writer
2019	Infidèle	Nils	
