= Diane Kruger =

German actress (born 1976)

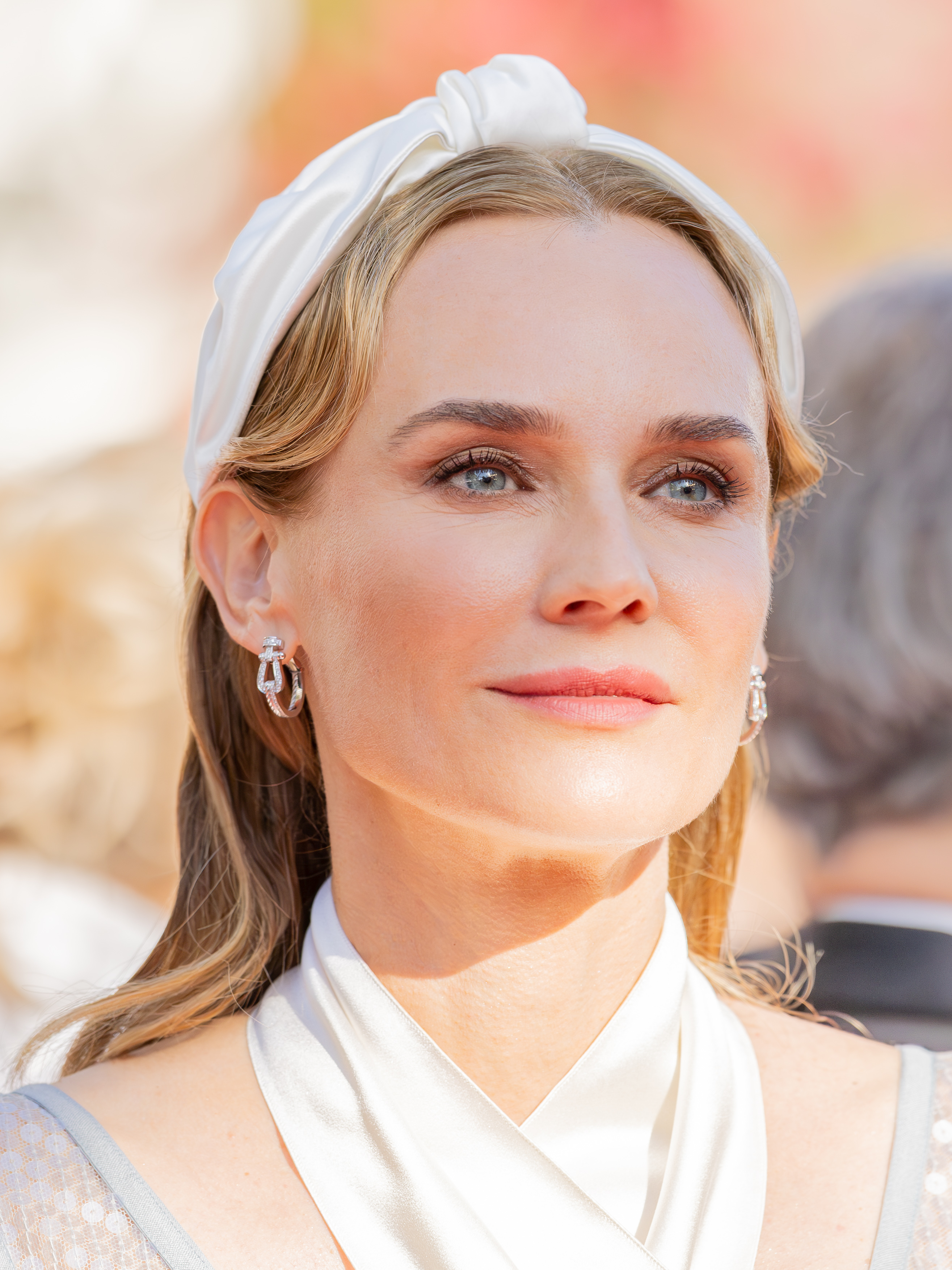
- Kruger in 2025
- Born: Diane Heidkrüger; 15 July 1976 (age 50); Algermissen, Lower Saxony, West Germany
- Occupation: Actress
- Years active: 1992–present
- Spouse: Guillaume Canet (m. 2001; div. 2006)
- Partners: Joshua Jackson (2006–2016); Norman Reedus (2016–present)
- Children: 1

Diane Kruger (German: [diˈaːnə ˈkʁuːɡɐ], née Heidkrüger; born 15 July 1976) is a German actress. She is a former model-turned-actress who, early in her film career, gained worldwide recognition and received the Trophée Chopard from the Cannes Film Festival.

Kruger was born in Algermissen, West Germany. She was trained from a young age to become a ballerina and studied at the Royal Academy in Hanover and the Royal Ballet School in London. She won the 1992 Elite Model Look national contest and signed with Elite Model Management, working in Paris and then New York. In the late 1990s, she left modelling and transitioned to acting.

Kruger became known for her roles in films such as Helen in the epic war film Troy (2004), Dr. Abigail Chase in the heist film National Treasure (2004) and its 2007 sequel, Bridget von Hammersmark in Quentin Tarantino's war film Inglourious Basterds (2009), and Gina in the psychological thriller film Unknown (2011). She also starred as Detective Sonya Cross in the FX crime drama series The Bridge (2013–14). In 2017, she made her German-language debut in Fatih Akin's In the Fade, for which she won the Cannes Film Festival Award for Best Actress. In 2019, Kruger starred in the spy-thriller The Operative with Martin Freeman.

== Early life and education ==
Diane Heidkrüger was born on 15 July 1976 in Algermissen, Lower Saxony, West Germany. Her mother, Maria-Theresa, was employed as a bank clerk. Her father, Hans-Heinrich, formerly employed as a cinema projectionist, was a computer scientist. One of her grandmothers was Polish. She was brought up in Algermissen with her younger brother, Stefan.

When she was two years old, her mother took the initiative to enrol her in after-school ballet dance classes. Kruger envisioned becoming a ballerina. She practised ballet dancing, whether entrechats or barre workouts, from a young age at the Freese-Baus Ballettschule in Hildesheim. When Kruger was between eight and nine years old, the director of the Freese-Baus Ballettschule, Rainer Baus, used a photograph of her to illustrate a promotional poster for the school. Baus believed that Kruger did not necessarily aspire to pursue a career as a professional ballet dancer, although he added that she "incontestably had talent". She grew up in a deeply Catholic German family, and attended Catholic school. She said that to "make money" from ages 10 to 12, she would attend funeral services, standing near the coffins with a candle in her hand, thus characterising herself as a "professional mourner". Kruger received a "rigid" Catholic education.

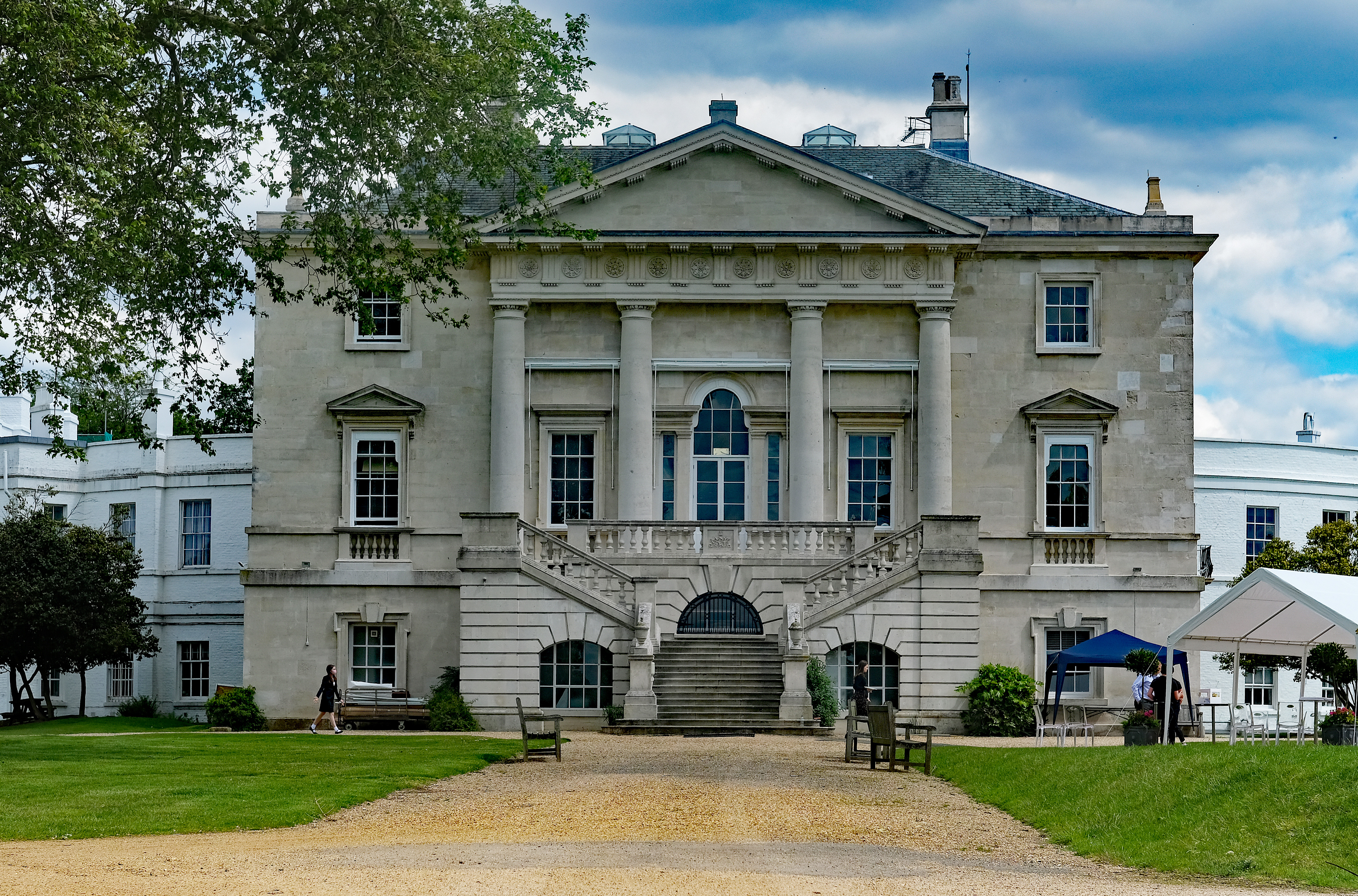
The London Royal Ballet School at White Lodge (pictured), Richmond Park, where Kruger pursued her ballet training

Kruger took additional dance classes at the Royal Academy of Hanover, where British teachers came to teach, Kruger said. To teach her the value of individual autonomy and to improve her English, her mother sent her to London, United Kingdom, through student exchange programmes in dance. She thus studied at the Royal Ballet School in London, where she attended intensive training independently every summer from the age of 11. Kruger was passionate about Romy Schneider and Paris ever since her parents' honeymoon in that capital. She described her parents as "not poor but" belonging to the "lower-middle class".

Her father, frequently absent, had an alcohol addiction. Her mother left him, taking with her 13-year-old Diane and her brother. She then found herself responsible for her brother, while her mother worked at the bank. Kruger remembered a difficult family situation due to her father's disease, during which her mother had to face the hardships alone. Kruger said that she perceived her mother's strength of character, but as the eldest sibling, she also "definitely saw her doubts and fears and her struggles as a woman".

Her parents divorced when she was 13. Being on stage and dancing enabled Kruger to express her "emotions" as she lived in a tumultuous environment; still, from puberty onwards, she doubted her ability to reach the prima ballerina status. A knee injury put an end to her ballet plans, obligating her to resume her education by returning to her "strict" Catholic school. She earned her pocket money, which her mother could not give her, by working mornings delivering newspapers during the school year, and doing odd jobs during the summer.

== Career ==
=== Modelling ===
Kruger, then 15 years old, entered the Elite Model Look national competition in 1992 in Hamburg and won first prize, the Look of the Year Modelling Award. The reward was an "entry ticket" into professional modelling from Elite Model Management, as well as a Vespa. She then represented Germany at the Elite's Look of the Year competition, held in New York that same year and hosted by Donald Trump. Kruger moved to Paris, France, on her own at the age of 15. At Elite Model Management, she requested to have her test shoots done based on what she had seen in a magazine. She signed with Elite modelling agency.

Despite her relatively short stature for a model, Kruger rapidly made a name for herself, being hired for advertisements by Yves Saint Laurent, Chanel, Salvatore Ferragamo, Giorgio Armani, Jil Sander, Christian Dior, Burberry and Louis Vuitton; runway shows from Marc Jacobs, D&G, and Sonia Rykiel; and appearances on the cover of Vogue Paris, Marie Claire, and Cosmopolitan to her modelling repertoire. In the 1990s, Kruger lived near the Tuileries in Paris, in a building intended for models, rented by the agency. She went "from photo shoots to fashion shows and from cocktails to parties, from the Bains Douches to Queens" during a period that was "joyful". She met German fashion designer Karl Lagerfeld during a photo shoot for Elle magazine at her apartment on rue de l'Université in Paris. Kruger became and remained close to Lagerfeld.

Kruger subsequently moved to the United States and settled in New York. In 1997, at the age of 21, she felt bored after five years of modelling and, in conjunction with a romantic disappointment with the man she was dating, left New York. She returned to Paris and gave up her apartment while she was "at the height of her modelling career", wrote Noam Friedlander of The Daily Telegraph. As she gradually stepped away from modelling in the late 1990s, a new era began, saying: "You had to be very thin, the dresses were dreary".

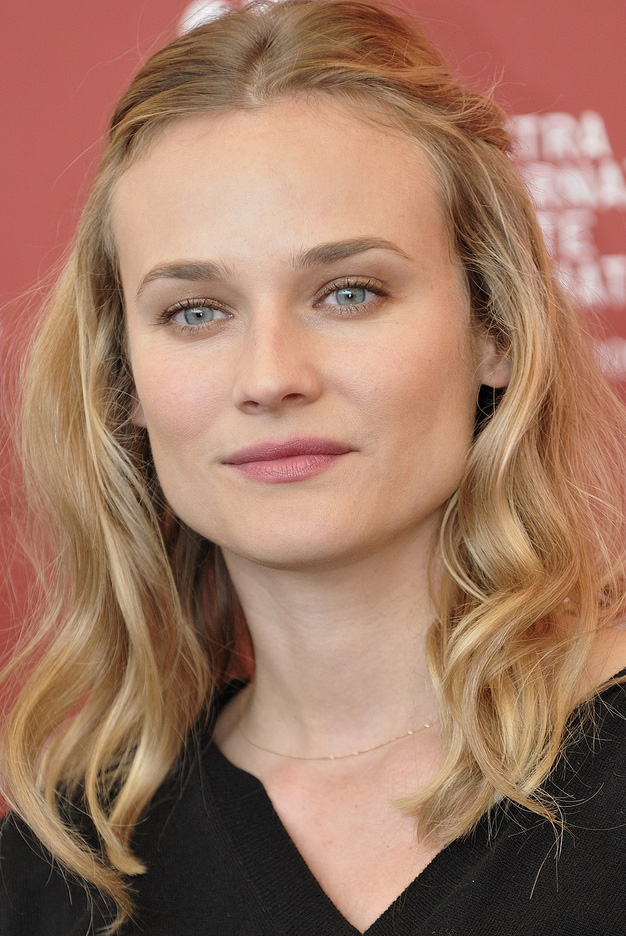
Kruger at the 2009 Venice Film Festival

=== Acting ===
Kruger was 17 years old and not yet fluent in French when filmmaker Luc Besson auditioned her for a role in The Fifth Element. Although she was not selected for a role, Besson nonetheless advised her to enrol at the Cours Florent drama school.

Back in Paris, Kruger met French actor Guillaume Canet in 1999, who encouraged her to take a theatre course to assess her abilities as a potential actress, she later said. She then enrolled at the Cours Florent drama school, where she would remain for the next two years. Kruger discovered her calling at the Cours Florent. Being an actress was the next apparent step, allowing her to do more concrete and tangible work than modelling while continuing to travel.

She made her film debut in 2002, opposite Dennis Hopper and Christopher Lambert in The Piano Player, a TV film by Jean-Pierre Roux. The same year, she also starred in her then-husband's directorial debut, Mon Idole.

She played Julie Wood in 2003's Michel Vaillant and Lisa in Wicker Park (2004), alongside Josh Hartnett and Rose Byrne. One of her more high-profile roles to date is her portrayal of Helen of Sparta in Wolfgang Petersen's epic Troy. In 2004, Kruger starred with Nicolas Cage and Sean Bean (who co-starred with her in Troy) in the film National Treasure, going on to appear in films Joyeux Noël (2005) and screened out of competition at the 2005 Cannes Film Festival. and Copying Beethoven (2006). She reprised her role as Dr. Abigail Chase in National Treasure: Book of Secrets, released in December 2007.

In 2009, Kruger co-starred as a German actress turned Allied spy in Quentin Tarantino's film Inglourious Basterds. In December 2009, she announced the nominations of the 67th Golden Globe Awards and also picked up nominations from the Screen Actors' Guild for Best Supporting Actress and Outstanding Performance by a Cast of a Motion Picture for her role in Inglourious Basterds.

Kruger played Anna in Jaco Van Dormael's Mr. Nobody. Critical response has praised the film's artistry and Kruger's acting. Kruger made a cameo appearance in an April 2010 episode of the Fox show Fringe, in which her former boyfriend, actor Joshua Jackson, starred. In 2010, Kruger also appeared in Mark Ronson's music video for "Somebody to Love Me", where she plays Boy George.

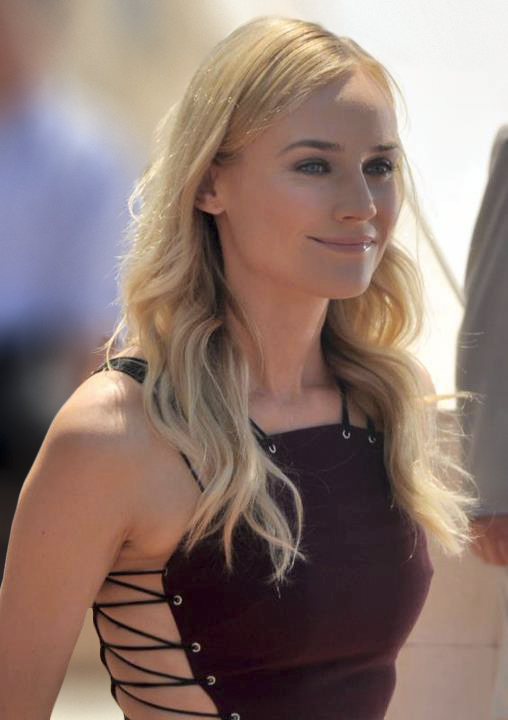
Kruger at the 2012 Cannes Film Festival

In the 2011 film Unknown, Kruger starred as Gina, a Bosnian undocumented immigrant, and key character alongside leading actor Liam Neeson. It was also announced in 2011 that Kruger had replaced Eva Green in the role of Marie Antoinette in the French-language film, Les Adieux à la Reine.

She starred in the film adaptation of Stephenie Meyer's novel The Host, which was released in March 2013. Kruger also portrayed El Paso, Texas, police officer Sonya Cross on FX's The Bridge, which aired in 2013. In 2016, she co-starred in The Infiltrator with Bryan Cranston and John Leguizamo.

In 2017, Kruger made a rare film appearance in Germany in the thriller In the Fade by Fatih Akin, for which she won several awards. In 2019, Kruger replaced Marion Cotillard in the spy movie The 355, playing a BND agent.

In 2019, Kruger starred in the spy-thriller The Operative with Martin Freeman.

In 2022, Kruger starred in the thriller Out of the Blue, opposite Ray Nicholson, son of Jack. The following year, she joined the cast of David Cronenberg's The Shrouds, replacing Léa Seydoux, portraying three different characters in the film.

=== Other activities ===
Kruger was the hostess of the opening and closing ceremonies of the 2007 Cannes Film Festival. She was a member of the jury for the main competition at the 58th Berlin International Film Festival in 2008, chaired by Costa Gavras; the 2012 Cannes Film Festival, chaired by Nanni Moretti; and the 2015 Venice Film Festival, chaired by Alfonso Cuaron. In 2025, she served as president of the jury at the 18th Angoulême Francophone Film Festival (FFA).

== Public image ==
Kruger was included in People's "50 Most Beautiful People in the World" 2004 issue. She appeared on Maxim's "Hot 100" list twice, ranking at No. 50 in 2005 and No. 88 in 2009. She also ranked at No. 83 on AskMen's "Top 99 Women" list in 2010.

Kruger is a brand ambassador for Swiss watch manufacturer Jaeger-LeCoultre. Since 2009, she has been a global "spokesmodel" of L'Oréal. In 2010, she became the face for Calvin Klein's Beauty fragrance line.

== Personal life ==
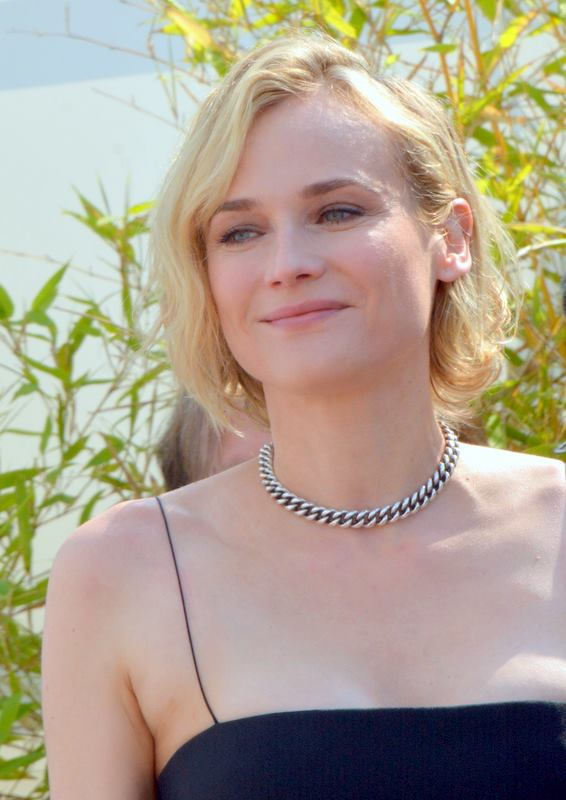
Kruger in 2017

Kruger is trilingual, being fluent in German, English, and French. Additionally, she studied Latin in school for eight years, though she does not speak it.

Kruger has stated that she has a fear of horses and will not take part in any films that require her to ride or interact with horses, revealing that she has given up roles in the past because of this. Her fear stems from having been previously thrown off the animals by accident.

In 1999, she began dating Guillaume Canet. They were married in September 2001. They acted together in Joyeux Noël (2005) and divorced in 2006. Kruger said that the marriage was unsuccessful because their careers had kept them in different parts of the world.

From 2006 to 2016, she was in a relationship with actor Joshua Jackson.

In 2015, Kruger met actor Norman Reedus on the set of Sky. The two were first seen together as a couple in July 2016. In November 2018, Kruger gave birth to their daughter, her first and his second child. She sold her fourth-floor apartment in the Parisian neighborhood of Saint-Germain to Karl Lagerfeld when she learned she was pregnant because it did not have an elevator.

Kruger has predominantly hyperactive-impulsive ADHD and has been taking medication for the condition since childhood.

Kruger is a US green card holder.

== Filmography ==
=== Film ===
Year	Title	Role	Language	Notes
2001	Point de lendemain	Agnes	French	Short subject
2002	Duelles	Sabine	French	Episode: "Mauvaise conduite"
2002	The Piano Player	Erika Nile	English	American title: The Target
2002	Not For, or Against	A call girl	French	French title: Ni pour, ni contre (bien au contraire)
2002	Mon Idole	Clara Broustal	French	English title: Whatever You Say
2003	Michel Vaillant	Julie Wood	French	
2004	Troy	Helen	English	
2004	Wicker Park	Lisa	English	
2004	Narco	La fille du night-club	French	
2004	National Treasure	Abigail Chase	English	
2005	Joyeux Noël	Anna Sørensen	French, English, German	
2005	Frankie	Frankie	French	
2006	Les Brigades du Tigre	Constance Radetsky	French	English title: The Tiger Brigades
2006	Copying Beethoven	Anna Holtz	English	
2007	Goodbye Bafana	Gloria Gregory	English	
2007	Days of Darkness	Véronica Star	French	French title: L'Âge des ténèbres
2007	The Hunting Party	Mirjana	English	
2007	National Treasure: Book of Secrets	Abigail Chase	English	
2008	Anything for Her	Lisa	French	
2009	Inglourious Basterds	Bridget von Hammersmark	English, French, German	
2009	Mr. Nobody	Anna	English	
2009	Farewell	Femme jogging	French	French title: L'Affaire Farewell
2010	Inhale	Diane Stanton	English	
2010	Lily Sometimes	Clara	French	French title: Pieds nus sur les limaces
2011	Unknown	Gina	English	
2011	Forces spéciales	Elsa	French	English title: Special Forces
2012	Farewell, My Queen	Marie Antoinette	French	French title: Les adieux à la Reine
2012	Un plan parfait	Isabelle	French	English title: A Perfect Plan / Fly Me to the Moon
2013	The Host	The Seeker/Lacey	English	
2013	Me, Myself and Mum	Ingeborg	French	French title: Les Garçons et Guillaume, à table!
2013	The Galapagos Affair: Satan Came to Eden	Margret Wittmer	English	Narration/Voice
2014	The Better Angels	Sarah Bush Lincoln	English	
2015	Fathers and Daughters	Elizabeth	English	
2015	Disorder	Jessie	French	
2015	Sky	Romy	English	
2016	The Infiltrator	Kathy Ertz	English	
2017	In the Fade	Katja Sekerci	German	German title: Aus dem Nichts
2017	All That Divides Us	Julia Keller	French	
2018	JT LeRoy	Eva	English	
2018	Welcome to Marwen	Deja Thoris	English	
2019	The Operative	Rachel	English	
2019	QT8: The First Eight	Herself	English	Documentary film
2022	The 355	Marie Schmidt	English	
2022	Out of the Blue	Marilyn	English	
2022	Marlowe	Clare Cavendish	English	
2023	Visions	Estelle	French	
2023	Joika	Tatiyana Volkova	English	Biopic drama
2024	The Shrouds	Becca / Terry / Hunny	English	
2024	Longing	Alice	English	
2024	Saint-Exupéry		French	Adventure biopic drama
2025	Amrum	Tessa Bendixen	German	
TBA	A.M.I. †	Ami	English	Filming
TBA	Projet K †	Beate Klarsfeld	French	Filming

=== Television ===
Year	Title	Role	Language	Notes
2010	Fringe	Miranda Greene	English	Episode: "Olivia. In the Lab. With the Revolver"
2013–2014	The Bridge	Detective Sonya Cross	English	Main role
2020	Robot Chicken	Caroline Flack (voice)	English	Episode: "Callie Greenhouse in: Fun. Sad. Epic. Tragic."
2022	Swimming with Sharks	Joyce Holt	English	Main role
2025	Little Disasters	Jess	English	Main role
2025	The Seduction	Madame de Rosemonde	French	Main role
2025	Marlene	Marlene Dietrich	TBA	

== Awards and nominations ==
Year	Award	Category	Nominated work	Result
2003	Cannes Film Festival	Chopard Trophy for Female Revelation	—N/a	Won
2004	Bambi Award	—N/a	—N/a	Won
2004	Saturn Award	Best Supporting Actress	National Treasure	Nominated
2007	Teen Choice Awards	Choice Movie Actress – Action, Adventure	National Treasure: Book of Secrets	Nominated
2009	Broadcast Film Critics Association	Best Cast	Inglourious Basterds	Won
2009	San Diego Film Critics Society	Best Cast	Inglourious Basterds	Won
2009	Saturn Awards	Best Supporting Actress	Inglourious Basterds	Nominated
2009	Online Film Critics Society	Best Supporting Actress	Inglourious Basterds	Nominated
2010	Screen Actors Guild Awards	Outstanding Performance by a Cast in a Motion Picture	Inglourious Basterds	Won
2010	Screen Actors Guild Awards	Outstanding Performance by a Female Actor in a Supporting Role	Inglourious Basterds	Nominated
2013	Newport Beach Film Festival	Best Actress	A Perfect Plan	Won
2015	Elle Style Awards	Best Movie Actress	—N/a	Won
2017	Cannes Film Festival	Best Actress	In the Fade	Won
2017	Satellite Awards	Best Actress – Motion Picture	In the Fade	Won (Note: Tied with Sally Hawkins for The Shape of Water)
2018	German Film Award	Best Actress	In the Fade	Nominated
2023	Zurich Film Festival	Golden Eye Award	—N/a	Won

== Honors ==
- Officer of the Ordre des Arts et des Lettres (22 September 2014)
