= Hercule et Sherlock =

- Directed by: Jeannot Szwarc
- Written by: Joseph Morhaim and A Sanford Wolf (Original Story); Valentine Albin (Adaptation); Marie-Christine de Montbrial and Michel Frichet (French Version); Laurent Chalumeau (Additional Dialogue)
- Produced by: Marie-Christine de Montbrial
- Starring: Christopher Lambert; Richard Anconina; Philippine Leroy-Beaulieu
- Cinematography: Bernard Lutic
- Edited by: Kako Kelber; Françoise London; Chantal Pernecker
- Music by: Gabriel Yared
- Production companies: Agepro Cinéma; Les Films Alain Sarde; M.F. Productions; TF1 Films Production
- Distributed by: BAC Films
- Release date: 4 December 1996 (France)
- Running time: 95 min.
- Country: France
- Language: French
- Budget: $10.5 million
- Box office: $7.2 million

Hercule et Sherlock is a 1996 French comedy film directed by Jeannot Szwarc and starring Christopher Lambert. This marks his first venture away from action films and B-movies and into family-friendly comedy.

== Plot ==
When a counterfeiter is captured, two of his thugs have to work with two counterfeit money-sniffing dogs named Hercule and Sherlock in order to find the lost cash.

== Cast ==
- Christopher Lambert as Vincent
- Richard Anconina as Bruno
- Philippine Leroy-Beaulieu as Marie
- Roland Blanche as Antoine Morand
- Béatrice Agenin as Nicole Morand
- Élise Tielrooy as Pauline
- Laurent Gendron as Daniel

== Reception ==
Isabelle Danel from Télérama was not very enthusiastic about the film, stating that only dogs and people below 12 years would find the film interesting.
