= A.M.I. =

- Directed by: Fernando Szurman
- Written by: John Wesley Norton; Ezequiel Martinez Jr.
- Produced by: Roger Corbi; Yan Fisher-Romanovsky; Christian Mercuri; Shane Walker
- Starring: Mads Mikkelsen; Diane Kruger
- Production companies: Fishcorb; Capstone Pictures; Conch Republic Films
- Countries: United States; Spain
- Language: English

A.M.I. is an upcoming science fiction survival thriller film directed by Fernando Szurman and written by John Wesley Norton and Ezequiel Martinez Jr.. It stars Mads Mikkelsen and Diane Kruger.

== Premise ==
An astronaut (Mikkelsen) crash-lands on an uncharted planet after a catastrophic accident with only his Quantum AI companion Ami (Kruger) left to aid in his escape.

== Cast ==
- Mads Mikkelsen as Lt. Teague
- Diane Kruger as Ami

== Production ==
In September 2025, principal photography began in Spain, for a science fiction survival thriller film directed by Fernando Szurman, starring Mads Mikkelsen and Diane Kruger.
