= Sedef Ecer =

French-Turkish playwright, novelist, actress and screenwriter

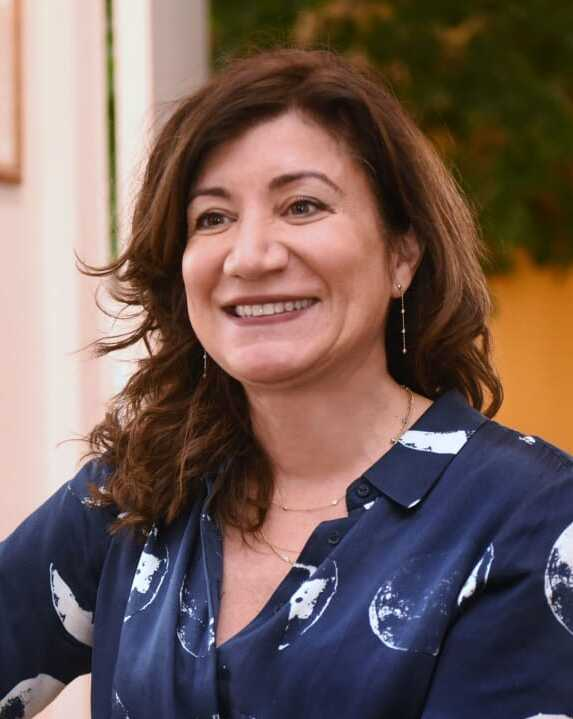
- Born: 1965 (age 60–61); Istanbul, Turkey
- Occupations: Playwright; novelist; actress; screenwriter
- Website: Official website

Sedef Ecer (born 1965) is a Turkish-French playwright, novelist, actress and screenwriter. She began her career as a child film actress in Turkey, and later moved to France. She has written a number of plays in both Turkish and French, which have been widely translated, and her first novel was published in 2021.

== Biography ==
Ecer was born in Istanbul in 1965. She attended Boğaziçi University. She was a child film actress, and says that she appeared in around 25 Turkish feature films between the ages of three and 10. She continued to act as an adult and appeared in the 1994 Turkish drama Yengeç Sepeti.

In 2008 she wrote the French play Sur le seuil, which she and a co-translator subsequently translated into Turkish as Eşikte. It was also translated into Polish and into Hebrew and Persian radio adaptations. It was performed at the Cent Quatre and the Maison des Auteurs in 2009, and at the İstanbul Tiyatro Festivali in 2010. In 2011 she co-wrote and appeared in the French television comedy film Comme chez soi. In 2013 she was the artist-in-residence at the Maison d'Europe et d'Orient.

As part of a writer-in-residence programme in Île-de-France in 2010 she wrote the play A la périphérie, which in 2010 received a Guérande theatrical writing prize. In 2014 it was staged at the Théâtre Jean-Vilar in Suresnes, directed by Thomas Bellorini. In 2014/2015 it was translated into German as Am Rand and performed at the Theater der Stadt Aalen, directed by Tina Brüggemann. The Turkish version, Kenardakiler, was performed at TOY Istanbul in 2016/2017. In 2019 an English language version, At the Periphery, translated from the Turkish by Evren Odcikin, was performed at the Crowded Fire Theater in San Francisco (directed by Erin Gilley). A review of a 2020 season (retitled On the Periphery) by Broadway World described the production as "hauntingly" presenting "the plight of social outcasts living on the periphery of 1990's Istanbul".

In 2015 her Turkish play e-mülteci.com premiered at the International Izmir Festival. It was subsequently translated into French and English under the titles e-passeur.com and e.smuggler.com respectively. It was performed at a number of French theatres, and a staged reading directed by Lisa Rothe took place at the New York Public Library in 2018. In 2016 her play Lady First, a French-language political satire, was performed at the Théâtre du Peuple, directed by Vincent Goethals. An article in L'Alsace noted that it was based on a short piece Ecer had presented at the theatre in 2012; Goethals had worked with her to develop a longer piece. It was subsequently performed at the Opéra-Théâtre de Metz Métropole in 2017 and 2018.

Ecer's first novel in French, Trésor national, was published in 2021. It is about the narrator's relationship with her mother, a famous Turkish actress, and links the actress's rise and decline to Turkey's political fortunes from the 1960s to the present day. The novel was inspired by her own experiences as a child film star.

In 2023 she held the Randell Cottage Writers' Residency in Wellington, New Zealand. She spent her time on the residency writing a historical novel about New Zealand and Turkish women involved with the Gallipoli campaign.

== Selected writing ==
- Trésor national (French language novel, JC Lattès, 2021)
- Lady First (French language play, 2016)
- e-mülteci.com (Turkish language play, 2015, translated into French and English)
- À la périphérie (French language play, 2014, translated into Turkish, German and English)
- Comme chez soi (French television film, 2011)
- Sur le seuil (French language play, 2008, translated into Turkish, Polish, Hebrew and Persian)
