= Algermissen =

- Municipality
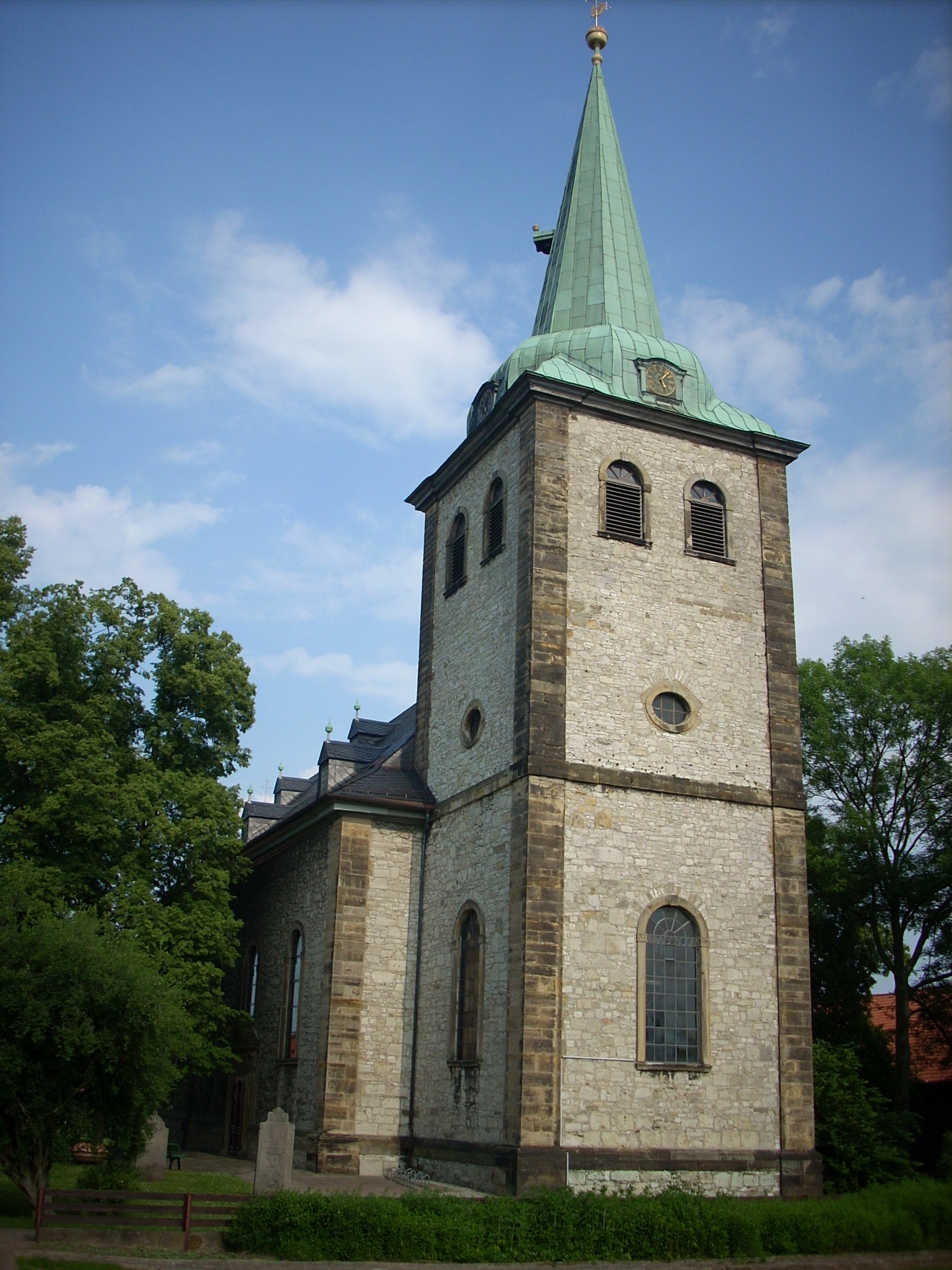
- St. Matthäus Catholic Church

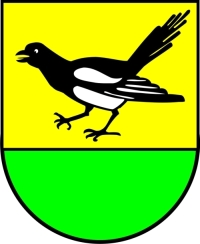
- Coat of arms

- Location of Algermissen within Hildesheim district
- Interactive map of Algermissen
- Location within Germany Location within Lower Saxony
- Coordinates: 52°15′16″N 09°58′16″E
- Country: Germany
- State: Lower Saxony
- District: Hildesheim

Government
  - Mayor (2023–28): Frank-Thomas Schmidt (Ind.)

Area
  - Total: 35.62 km^{2} (13.75 sq mi)
- Elevation: 76 m (249 ft)

Population (2025-12-31)
  - Total: 7,704
  - Density: 216.3/km^{2} (560.2/sq mi)
- Time zone: UTC+01:00 (CET)
  - Summer (DST): UTC+02:00 (CEST)
- Postal codes: 31191
- Dialling codes: 05126
- Vehicle registration: HI
- Website: www.algermissen.de

Algermissen is a village and a municipality in the district of Hildesheim, in Lower Saxony, Germany. It is situated approximately 12 km north of Hildesheim, and 20 km southeast of Hanover. The name of the town originates from a prominent German family who lived in the area until the Revolutions of 1848—the Algermissens were of the revolutionary party and were driven from Germany when the revolution was suppressed. Part of the family relocated to Missouri, in the United States, but the town continued to bear their name.

== Notable residents ==
The German actress Diane Kruger was born in Algermissen.
