= Our Happy Lives =

1999 film

- Directed by: Jacques Maillot
- Written by: Jacques Maillot; Eric Veniard
- Produced by: Laurent Bénégui
- Starring: Marie Payen
- Cinematography: Luc Pagès
- Edited by: Andrea Sedlácková
- Music by: Allie Delfau
- Distributed by: Mars Distribution
- Release date: 19 May 1999
- Running time: 147 minutes
- Country: France
- Language: French

Our Happy Lives (French: Nos vies heureuses) is a 1999 French drama film directed by Jacques Maillot. It was entered into the 1999 Cannes Film Festival.

== Cast ==
- Marie Payen - Julie
- Cécile Richard - Cécile
- Camille Japy - Emilie
- Sami Bouajila - Ali
- Eric Bonicatto - Jean-Paul
- Jean-Michel Portal - Lucas
- Sarah Grappin - Sylvie
- Olivier Py - François
- Alain Beigel - Antoine
- Fanny Cottençon - Cécile's mother
- Marc Chapiteau - Sylvie's father
- Frédéric Gélard - Vincent
- Jean-Paul Bonnaire - Lucas's father
- Jalil Lespert - Etienne
- Thomas Chabrol - Lawyer Carteret
- Samir Guesmi - Rachid
- Stéphane Brizé - Marco

== Production ==
Filming took place in Tours and Montbéliard (Doubs).
