= In the Fade =

2017 film

- Theatrical release poster
- Directed by: Fatih Akin
- Written by: Fatih Akin
- Produced by: Fatih Akin; Mélita Toscan du Plantier; Marie-Jeanne Pascal
- Starring: Diane Kruger
- Cinematography: Rainer Klausmann
- Edited by: Andrew Bird
- Music by: Josh Homme
- Production companies: Bombero International; Warner Bros. Film Productions Germany; Macassar Productions; Pathé; Dorje Film; Corazón International
- Distributed by: Warner Bros. Pictures (Germany); Pathé (France)
- Release dates: 26 May 2017 (Cannes); 23 November 2017 (Germany)
- Running time: 106 minutes
- Countries: Germany; France
- Language: German
- Box office: $5 million

In the Fade (German: Aus dem Nichts) is a 2017 German neo-noir drama thriller film, written and directed by Fatih Akin. It stars Diane Kruger as a German woman whose Turkish-Kurdish husband and son are killed in a terrorist attack perpetrated by neo-Nazis. It was selected to compete for the Palme d'Or in the main competition section at the 2017 Cannes Film Festival, where Kruger won the Best Actress award. It was selected as the German entry for the Best Foreign Language Film at the 90th Academy Awards, making the December shortlist, but it was ultimately not nominated. It did, however, win the Golden Globe Award for Best Foreign Language Film.

== Plot ==
Several years after he spent four years in prison for drug dealing, during which time he has studied business administration and gotten married, Kurdish-German Nuri Şekerci lives happily with his German wife, Katja, and their six-year-old son, Rocco. One day, Katja drops Rocco off at Nuri's office, a small travel agency in Hamburg, so she can spend the afternoon with her best friend. Heading out, she warns a young blonde woman leaving her new bicycle in front of the store that it will get stolen if she doesn't lock it up. When Katja returns that night she finds the street blocked off after a nail bomb detonated, killing Nuri and Rocco. Distraught, Katja tells the police about the woman with the bike and comes to believe the attack to be the work of Neo-Nazis.

The police rule out a Jihadist motive as Nuri was neither religious nor political and initially focus on revenge by drug traffickers, though they release a composite sketch of the blonde woman. After Katja declines Nuri's parents' request to bury the bodies in Turkey, Nuri's mother coldly informs her at the funeral that her grandson would still be alive if Katja had been a better mother. Devastated, Katja uses drugs and later attempts suicide by slashing her wrists, but changes her mind after hearing a voicemail from her lawyer Danilo Fava stating that two Neo-Nazi suspects, married couple André and Edda Möller, have been caught.

At the Möller trial, André's father, disgusted with his son's actions, testifies how he found bags of nails, fertilizer, and diesel in the garage. The defense argues that another party could have gained access to the garage through a hidden key. Forensics match the bomb to the material found in the garage, which bears fingerprints from the couple and an unknown individual, who could have been a store employee but who the defense claims as an unknown culprit. Nikolaos Makris, a Greek hotel owner, claims the Möllers were staying in Greece at the time of the bombing. It is revealed he is a member of the far-right party Golden Dawn and the Möllers liked Facebook photos of him at a rally in Germany. Katja testifies about seeing Edda outside the office but the defense calls her testimony into question by pointing out her drug use. Unable to dispel reasonable doubt due to the shared storage, the potential alibi and Katja's questionable testimony, the court acquits the couple.

Alerted to their location via a Facebook update, Katja searches for the Möllers in Greece by finding Makris' hotel. Katja follows Makris and finds the Möllers living in an RV on the beach. She builds a nail bomb and plants it under the vehicle in a backpack before changing her mind and retrieving it. After a few days' contemplation, she returns to the beach and sees the Möllers enter the RV. After a few moments, she enters wearing the backpack and detonates the bomb, killing herself and the Möllers.

== Cast ==
- Diane Kruger as Katja Şekerci, wife of Nuri and mother of Rocco
- Denis Moschitto as Danilo Fava, the Şekercis' attorney
- Johannes Krisch as Herr Haberbeck, attorney for the Möllers
- Samia Chancrin as Birgit, Katja's best friend
- Numan Acar as Nuri Şekerci, husband of Katja and father of Rocco
- Ulrich Tukur as Jürgen Möller, father of André
- Rafael Santana as Rocco Şekerci, 6-year-old son of Nuri and Katja
- Hanna Hilsdorf as Edda Möller, Neo-Nazi terrorist
- Ulrich Friedrich Brandhoff as André Möller, Neo-Nazi terrorist
- Yannis Ekonomides as Nikolaos Makris

== Production ==
The terrorist attack in the film was loosely based on the events of the 2004 Cologne bombing, when Neo-Nazis detonated a nail bomb, also hidden above a bicycle rack, on a busy commercial street in a heavily Turkish neighborhood in Cologne. Nobody was killed in the bombing but there were nearly two dozen injuries, several critical.

Filming for In the Fade began on 20 October 2016 and ended on 21 November 2016, with filming locations in Hamburg in St. Pauli and Alsterdorf, as well as in Greece, where the final scene was filmed at Schinias beach in Athens. Following Inglourious Basterds (2009), the film was only the second major German-language role for lead actress Diane Kruger, who had moved to the United States as a teenager.

While the original title translates to "Out of Nowhere" in English, the English title is taken from the song of the same name by American rock band Queens of the Stone Age, whose lead singer, Josh Homme, wrote the film's score.

== Reception ==
The film holds a 77% approval rating on review aggregator Rotten Tomatoes, based on 148 reviews with an average rating of 6.77/10. The website's critical consensus reads, "In the Fade proves Diane Kruger is more than up to the task of carrying a movie — even if the end result doesn't quite live up to her remarkable work." On Metacritic, the film has a weighted average score of 65 out of 100 based on 31 critics, indicating "generally favorable reviews".

== Accolades ==
| Award | Date of ceremony | Category | Recipient(s) and nominee(s) | Result | Ref. |
|---|---|---|---|---|---|
| Cannes Film Festival | 17–28 May 2017 | Best Actress | Diane Kruger | Won | |
| Golden Globe Awards | 7 January 2018 | Best Foreign Film | In the Fade | Won | |
| Critics' Choice Movie Awards | 11 January 2018 | Best Foreign Language Film | In the Fade | Won | |
| Satellite Awards | 11 February 2018 | Best Foreign Language Film | In the Fade | Won | |
| Satellite Awards | 11 February 2018 | Best Actress – Motion Picture | Diane Kruger | Won (Note: Tied with Sally Hawkins for The Shape of Water) | |

== See also ==
- List of submissions to the 90th Academy Awards for Best Foreign Language Film
- List of German submissions for the Academy Award for Best Foreign Language Film
