= Just Like Home (2011 film) =

- release poster
- French: Comme Chez Soi
- Written by: Philippe Le Dem; Sedef Ecer
- Directed by: Lorenzo Gabriele
- Starring: Philippe Lefebvre; Özz Nûjen; Elise Tielrooy
- Theme music composer: Thierry Malet
- Country of origin: France
- Original language: French

Production
- Producers: Sylvette Frydman; Jean-François Lepetit
- Cinematography: Philippe Lardon
- Editor: Marie Castro
- Running time: 85 minutes
- Production company: Flach Film Production

Original release
- Release: 8 October 2011

Just Like Home (French: Comme Chez Soi) is a 2011 French made for television comedy film directed by Lorenzo Gabriele.

== Synopsis ==
After a French and a Turkish family agree to swap houses for the holidays, the French family decides to cancel its holiday as the father's company is being taken over. Too late. The Turkish family arrives and must be taken in even though the house is too small to accommodate both families. Encounters, tensions and eventually learning ensue.

== Cast ==
- Philippe Lefebvre as Marc
- Özz Nûjen as Burhan
- Elise Tielrooy as Cécile
- Jean-Noël Martin as Le Patron de Marc
- Lika Minamoto as Jade
- Sabeline Amaury as Réceptionniste du Camping
- Shemss Audat as Defné
- Maxime Coggio as Victor
- Hanna Cohen as Miné
- Sedef Ecer as Banu
- Camille Verschuere as Betty
