= Whatever You Say (film) =

- French theatrical release poster
- Directed by: Guillaume Canet
- Screenplay by: Guillaume Canet; Philippe Lefebvre; Eric Naggar
- Produced by: Alain Attal
- Starring: François Berléand; Guillaume Canet; Diane Kruger; Daniel Prévost; Clotilde Courau
- Cinematography: Christophe Offenstein
- Edited by: Stratos Gabrielidis
- Music by: Sinclair
- Production companies: M6 Films; Canal+
- Distributed by: Mars Distribution
- Release date: 17 December 2002 (France)
- Running time: 110 minutes
- Country: France
- Language: French
- Budget: $4.3 million
- Box office: $2.8 million

Whatever You Say (original title: Mon idole) is a 2002 French comedy-drama film directed by Guillaume Canet and starring François Berléand, Guillaume Canet, Diane Kruger, Daniel Prévost, and Clotilde Courau.

== Plot ==
Philippe Letzger (Philippe Lefebvre) is the host of It's Tissue Time!, an exploitation television game show where contestants are made to cry. The show's audiences are warmed up by one of Letzger's assistants, Bastien (Guillaume Canet), an ambitious young man who provides Letzger with good ideas for the show, for which his boss eagerly takes credit. Bastien tolerates Letzger's antics in order to work with Jean-Louis Broustal (François Berléand), the show's sophisticated producer whom he admires. Bastien's girlfriend, Fabienne (Clotilde Courau), is frustrated by his worship of the suave producer. Bastien is equally frustrated when he finds out that the blonde he is attracted to at the office is in fact Broustal's young wife, Clara (Diane Kruger).

One day, Broustal begins to take interest in Bastien's ideas for the show, and invites him to spend the weekend with him and his wife at their country estate to work on a concept for a new show called Proof in Pictures. When they arrive, Clara quickly seduces Bastien, but Broustal does not seem to care. During the weekend, Broustal tells the young man that he can make him a television star, but the couple's motives seem strange, and possibly sinister.

== Cast ==
- François Berléand as Jean-Louis Broustal
- Guillaume Canet as Bastien
- Diane Kruger as Clara Broustal
- Philippe Lefebvre as Philippe Letzger
- Daniel Prévost as M. Balbot
- Clotilde Courau as Fabienne
- Jacqueline Jehanneuf as Maryvonne
- Andrée Damant as Micheline
- Gilles Lellouche as Daniel Bénard
- Jean-Paul Rouve as Patrick
- Anne Marivin as The assistant
- Laurent Lafitte as Fabrice
- Pierre Jolivet as Bertrand Vigneau

== Accolades ==
Award / Film Festival	Category	Recipients and nominees	Result
César Awards	Best Actor	François Berléand	Nominated
César Awards	Best First Feature Film		Nominated
European Film Awards	European Discovery of the Year		Nominated
