= Jacques Maillot =

French film director

- Born: 12 April 1962 (age 64); Besançon, France
- Occupations: Film director Screenwriter
- Years active: 1993-present

Jacques Maillot (French: [ʒak majo]; born 12 April 1962) is a French film director and screenwriter. He has directed nine films since 1993. His film Nos vies heureuses was entered into the 1999 Cannes Film Festival.

== Filmography ==
- Des fleurs coupées (1993)
- Corps inflammables (1995)
- 75 centilitres de prière (1995)
- Entre ciel et terre (1995)
- Our Happy Lives (1999)
- Froid comme l'été (2002)
- Rivals (2008)
- Un singe sur le dos (2009)
- La mer à boire (2012)
- Vivre sans eux (2018)
