= Jeannot Szwarc =

French film director (1939–2025)

- Born: 21 November 1939; Paris, Boulogne-Billancourt, France
- Died: 14 January 2025 (aged 85); Loches, Centre-Val de Loire, France
- Other name: Jean Szwarc
- Citizenship: France
- Education: Lycée Claude-Bernard; Lycée Saint-Louis de Gonzague; HEC
- Occupation: Director
- Years active: 1961–2019
- Spouses: Maud Strand; Cara de Menaul
- Children: 2

Jeannot Szwarc (English: /ʒɑːˈnoʊ ʃvɑːrtz/ zhah-NOH-SHVARTZ, French: [ʒano ʃvarts]; 21 November 1939 – 14 January 2025) was a French director known for his work in American film and television. His film credits included Jaws 2, Somewhere in Time, Supergirl and Santa Claus: The Movie. Szwarc had a prolific career spanning 6 decades before retirement from the industry in France.

== Early life and education ==
Szwarc was born into a Polish-Jewish family in Paris on 21 November 1939. When the Germans invaded the French capital in 1940, his family fled first to Portugal via Spain and then to Argentina. Returning to France in 1947, Szwarc obtained his scientific baccalauréat at Lycée Claude-Bernard and followed the first year of preparatory classes (classes préparatoires) in mathematics and physics at Lycée Saint-Louis de Gonzague.

Citing ill health, Szwarc was unable to advance to a Mathématiques spéciales class in his second year of classes préparatoires, for the purpose of gaining entry into a Grande École d'Ingénieurs and qualify as an engineer. He settled for HEC, a business school, graduating in 1961 with a Master's degree in management. Contrary to reports, he never studied political science, (Note: HEC has never offered graduate (let alone undergraduate) degrees in Political Science or courses leading to the diplomatic corps.) desired a career in diplomacy (Note: There is no indication that Szwarc ever considered a career in diplomacy.) or attended Harvard University. (Note: In a film interview, Szwarc referred to HEC as the "Froggy equivalent to Harvard" and this may have led to the impression (albeit false) that he had attended the university.)

At HEC, a work placement in the United States allowed him to discover the country. Szwarc, moreover, created a film society (or ciné-club) at the school which became popular with fellow students. He also directed student avant-garde plays such as Jean-Paul Sartre's No Exit. After HEC, keen to develop his passion for cinematography and without any formal training (he never attended film school), Szwarc started to produce short commercial films for an advertising company in Paris.

== Career ==
In 1962, lured by a career in the film industry, Szwarc abandoned the world of advertising after having secured a job as a production assistant in Stanley Donen's movie Charade, starring Audrey Hepburn and Cary Grant, which was shooting in Paris. He continued to work in television as a second unit director and writer/director of short subjects. However, work was limited and hard to find. In 1964, with no connections, and against advice from colleagues, Szwarc left Paris for Los Angeles in search of opportunities, but securing professional jobs in Hollywood was difficult.

It was hell…I worked odd jobs like writing scripts for a potato chip commercial. I was the guy who puts the laugh on the laugh tracks of a sitcom. After two and a half years of this, I realized that nobody was going to come along and say "Hey, kid....here's a film to direct".

=== Developing Ironside ===
In late 1966, while filling a low-level role for Universal, Szwarc submitted an internal memo to television producers detailing ideas for new series; one such idea was developed into a 70-page script for a crime drama and became the framework for the series Ironside (starring Raymond Burr). Szwarc was allowed to make his directorial debut on the show, and initial success led to further assignments. During the 1970s, he directed episodes of The Rockford Files, Kojak, Night Gallery, Columbo, The Six Million Dollar Man, and later, It Takes a Thief, Baretta, Ally McBeal, Heroes, The Practice, JAG, Grey's Anatomy, Bones, Castle, Without a Trace, as well as dozens of other series.

=== Directing feature films ===
The 1970s and 1980s saw Szwarc oscillate between feature and television films and series. His feature films include Bug (1975), Jaws 2 (1978), Somewhere in Time (1980), Supergirl (1984) Santa Claus: The Movie (1985) and Honor Bound. (1988). However, the box office failure of the last three caused him to move to his native France, where he directed comedies such as La Vengeance d'une blonde (1994) and Hercule et Sherlock (1996). Though La Vengeance d'une blonde was successful at the French box-office, these films found limited appeal outside national borders.

=== Return to television ===
Szwarc was called back to Hollywood in the early 2000s, where he resumed his career in television, his forte. In 2003, he joined the crew of The WB/CW television series Smallville as a director. One of the major episodes he directed was "Homecoming", the 200th episode of the series. Moreover, he co-directed, with Miguel Sapochnik, the first episode of the fifth and final season of the science-fiction/crime series Fringe, as well as multiple other episodes of the series throughout its run.

== Honours and awards ==
Szwarc won the Best Film of 1981 award for Somewhere in Time (1980) at the Fantafestival, the oldest and most important Italian Film Festival devoted to science fiction, fantasy and horror. In 2008, he was nominated for a Hugo Award (science fiction's most prestigious award) for an episode of Heroes.

== Personal life ==
Szwarc was married to actress Maud Strand, who starred in Somewhere in Time (1980). He subsequently divorced and married Cara de Menaul, a film production coordinator, with whom he had two sons, Sacha Szwarc and Stefan Szwarc. Both siblings work in the film industry.

== Death ==
Szwarc died from respiratory failure at Centre Hospitalier de Loches, near Tours, France, on 14 January 2025, at the age of 87.

== Selected filmography ==
=== Feature films ===
- 1973 – Extreme Close-Up
- 1975 – Bug
- 1978 – Jaws 2
- 1980 – Somewhere in Time
- 1982 – Enigma
- 1984 – Supergirl
- 1985 – Santa Claus: The Movie
- 1988 – Honor Bound
- 1994 – La Vengeance d'une blonde
- 1996 – Hercule et Sherlock
- 1997 – Les soeurs Soleil

=== Television films ===
- 1972 – Night of Terror
- 1972 – The Weekend Nun
- 1973 – The Devil's Daughter
- 1973 – You'll Never See Me Again
- 1973 – Lisa, Bright and Dark
- 1973 – A Summer Without Boys
- 1974 – The Small Miracle
- 1975 – Something Wonderful Happens Every Spring
- 1975 – Crime Club
- 1977 – Code Name: Diamond Head
- 1986 – The Murders in the Rue Morgue
- 1987 – Grand Larceny
- 1990 – Have a Nice Night
- 1995 – Schrecklicher Verdacht
- 1995 – The Rockford Files: A Blessing in Disguise
- 1996 – The Rockford Files: If the Frame Fits...

=== Television series ===
- Ironside (2 episodes)
- It Takes a Thief (3 episodes)
- Alias Smith and Jones (1 episode)
- Baretta (4 episodes)
- The Rockford Files (3 episodes)
- The Six Million Dollar Man (1 episode)
- Kojak (13 episodes)
- Night Gallery (19 episodes)
- Columbo: Lovely but Lethal (1 episode)
- The Twilight Zone (2 episodes)
- Prigioniera di una vendetta (mini-series)
- Seven Days (1 episode)
- Providence (1 episode)
- JAG (19 episodes)
- The Practice (18 episodes)
- Philly (1 episode)
- CSI: Miami (1 episode)
- Ally McBeal (5 episodes)
- Smallville (14 episodes)
- Without a Trace (12 episodes)
- Boston Legal (2 episodes)
- Heroes (6 episodes)
- Cold Case (7 episodes)
- Bones (10 episodes)
- Supernatural (5 episodes)
- Designated Survivor (1 episode)
- Raising the Bar (3 episodes)
- Numbers (1 episode)
- Grey's Anatomy (7 episodes)
- Fringe (7 episodes)
- The Protector (1 episode)
- Private Practice (4 episodes)
- Scandal (2 episodes)
- Castle (4 episodes)
- Criminal Minds: Beyond Borders (2 episodes)
