= Guillaume Canet =

French actor, film director and screenwriter (born 1973)

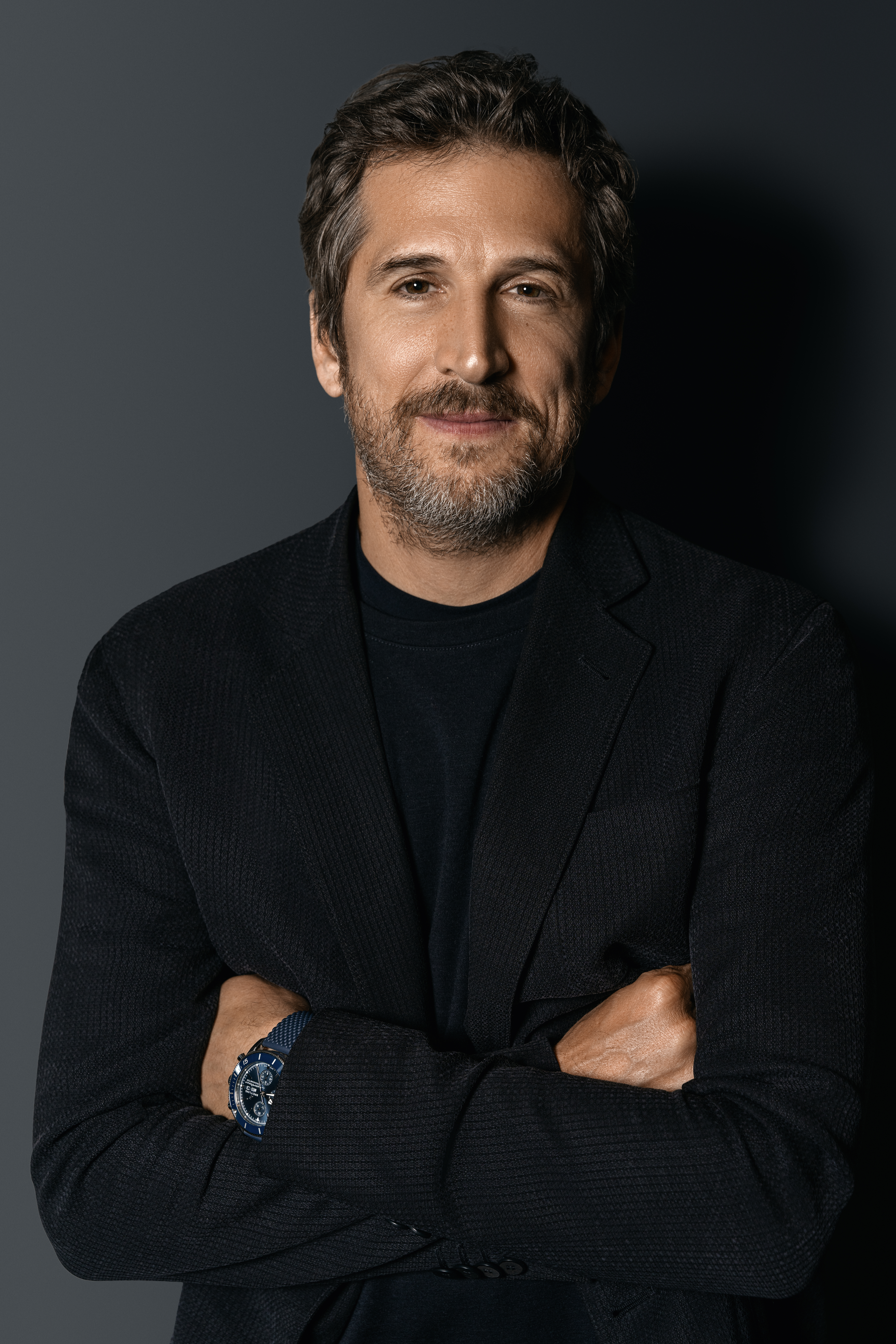
- Canet in 2021
- Born: Guillaume Arthur Jean-Louis Canet; 10 April 1973 (age 53); Boulogne-Billancourt, France
- Occupations: Actor, film director, screenwriter, film producer
- Years active: 1994–present
- Spouse: Diane Kruger (m. 2001; div. 2006)
- Partner: Marion Cotillard (2007–2025)
- Children: 2
- Website: guillaumecanet.net

Guillaume Arthur Jean-Louis Canet (French pronunciation: [ɡijom kanɛ]; born 10 April 1973) is a French actor, film director and screenwriter, and show jumper.

Canet began his career in theatre and television before moving to film. He starred in several films like Joyeux Noël, Love Me If You Dare, and The Beach. In 2006, he turned to writing and directing with Tell No One and won a César Award for Best Director.

== Early life and career ==
Guillaume Canet was born in Boulogne-Billancourt on 10 April 1973 to a family of horse breeders. Canet intended to become a show jumper and was a member of the junior French National Equestrian Team. However, after a fall from his horse at age 18 he turned to acting and enrolled in the Cours Florent drama school. In 1994, he appeared in the Théâtre Hébertot production of La Ville dont le prince est un enfant with Christophe Malavoy. After working in various television shows and commercials, Canet made his film debut in the short film Fils unique.

In 1997, he appeared in the thriller film Barracuda for which he won a prix d'interprétation (best actor award) at the Festival Saint-Jean-de-Luz in 1999. The same year he was nominated for a César Award for his role as Vincent Mazet in the comedy film En plein cœur. He then traveled abroad to film Danny Boyle's The Beach. After completing The Beach, Canet starred opposite Sophie Marceau in La fidélité and in Jerry Schatzberg's The Day the Ponies Come Back.

In 2002, Canet starred with Gérard Depardieu in the science fiction film Vidocq. He also directed and wrote his first feature film the same year, Mon Idole, which also starred his wife Diane Kruger. In 2003, he appeared opposite Marion Cotillard in Yann Samuell's Love Me If You Dare which became a sleeper hit. Canet next appeared in the international production Joyeux Noël which tells the story of the World War I Christmas cease fire. The film—which also featured Kruger—was nominated for an Academy Award for Best Foreign Language Film.

Canet released his second feature film in 2006, Tell No One, an adaptation of Harlan Coben's novel of the same name. Tell No One was the ninth top grossing French film of 2006 and went on to win four César awards, including a César Award for Best Director for Canet.

His film Blood Ties was selected to be screened Out of Competition at the 2013 Cannes Film Festival.

== Personal life ==
In 1999, he started a relationship with German-born model and actress Diane Kruger. They were married on 1 September 2001. In January 2006, Canet and Kruger filed for divorce. Kruger later said that the marriage was not successful because their careers had kept them occupied in different parts of the world. After his divorce, Canet started a relationship with Italian model Carla Bruni that was widely reported by the French media, and later he was in a relationship with French actress Élodie Navarre.

From October 2007 to 2025, Canet was in a relationship with French actress Marion Cotillard. They had known each other since 1997, and years later starred together in the 2003 film Love Me If You Dare. They later co-starred in the films The Last Flight (2009), Rock'n Roll (2017), and Asterix & Obelix: The Middle Kingdom (2023); and Canet directed Cotillard in Little White Lies (2010), Blood Ties (2013), Little White Lies 2 (2019), Asterix & Obelix: The Middle Kingdom (2023), and Karma (2026). The couple attracted considerable attention from the French media, but for a long time they did not discuss their relationship and did not appear together on a red carpet event until the Cannes Film Festival in 2009. Canet and Cotillard have two children together, a son, born on 19 May 2011, and a daughter, born in 2017. Canet and Cotillard never married. Though since 2010 Cotillard had been spotted wearing a diamond solitaire on her left hand – a present from Canet – they were not engaged either. In 2014, Cotillard denied being married to Canet, instead referring to him as "my boyfriend" in interviews. On 27 June 2025, Canet and Cotillard announced their separation in a joint statement to French news agency Agence France-Presse, saying that they made the separation public "to avoid all speculation, rumors and risky interpretations", and that they decided to separate after 18 years together by "mutual agreement" and with "mutual goodwill".

Canet lives in Paris.

In July 2012, paparazzo Jean-Claude Elfassi accused Canet of violence during an altercation as Canet and Cotillard arrived home from the hospital maternity ward with their newborn son in May 2011. According to the photographer, Canet left his house with an iron bar and threatened him before police stepped in. Elfassi's son filmed the actor with his cell phone and while Canet made sure the footage was erased from the web, photos were published on French magazine Entrevue. Elfassi and his son attempted to sue the actor for "violence" and "theft" and their case was not only dismissed, but Elfassi faces charges for "false accusation" and could spend nine months in jail.

Canet is an accomplished show jumper and between 2012 and 2017 participated in 623 competitions, winning 33 of them and taking nearly €67,000 in prize money. He was notably placed in competitions at international shows in Paris, La Baule and Chantilly Jumping.

== Filmography ==
=== Short film ===
Year	Title	Director	Writer
1996	Sans Regrets	Yes	No
1998	Je taim	Yes	Yes
2000	Scénarios sur la drogue	Yes	No
2000	J'peux pas dormir	Yes	Yes

Acting roles

- 1995 : Fils unique, directed by Philippe Landoulsi
- 1999 : Trait d'union, directed by Bruno García
- 2000 : J'peux pas dormir..., directed by Guillaume Canet

=== Feature film ===
Year	Title	Director	Writer	Producer
2002	Mon Idole	Yes	Yes	Yes
2006	Tell No One	Yes	Yes	No
2010	Little White Lies	Yes	Yes	No
2013	Blood Ties	Yes	Yes	Yes
2017	Rock'n Roll	Yes	Yes	Co-producer
2019	Little White Lies 2	Yes	Yes	Co-producer
2021	Lui	Yes	Yes	No
2022	Asterix & Obelix: The Middle Kingdom	Yes	Yes	No
2026	Karma	Yes	Yes	No

Acting roles

- 1997 : Barracuda, directed by Philippe Haïm, prix d'interprétation au Festival de Saint-Jean-de-Luz
- 1998 : Sentimental Education, directed by C. S. Leigh
- 1998 : Ceux qui m'aiment prendront le train, directed by Patrice Chéreau
- 1998 : En plein cœur, directed by Pierre Jolivet, adapted from the novel by Georges Simenon, En cas de malheur
- 1999 : Je règle mon pas sur le pas de mon père, directed by Rémi Waterhouse
- 2000 : The Beach (La Plage), directed by Danny Boyle
- 2000 : Fidelity (La Fidélité), directed by Andrzej Żuławski
- 2000 : The Day the Ponies Come Back, directed by Jerry Schatzberg
- 2001 : Les Morsures de l'aube, directed by Antoine de Caunes
- 2001 : Vidocq, directed by Pitof
- 2002 : Le Frère du guerrier, directed by Pierre Jolivet
- 2002 : Mille millièmes, directed by Rémi Waterhouse
- 2002 : Mon Idole, directed by Guillaume Canet
- 2003 : Love Me If You Dare (Jeux d'enfants), directed by Yann Samuell
- 2003 : Les Clefs de bagnole, directed by Laurent Baffie (only a cameo, as himself)
- 2004 : Narco, directed by Tristan Aurouet and Gilles Lellouche
- 2005 : Joyeux Noël, directed by Christian Carion
- 2005 : Hell (L'Enfer), directed by Danis Tanović
- 2005 : Un ticket pour l'espace, directed by Éric Lartigau
- 2006 : Tell No One (Ne le dis à personne), directed by Guillaume Canet
- 2006 : Cars (French voice of Flash McQueen)
- 2007 : Ensemble, c'est tout, directed by Claude Berri
- 2007 : Darling, directed by Christine Carrière
- 2007 : La clef, directed by Guillaume Nicloux
- 2008 : Rivals, directed by Jacques Maillot
- 2008 : Voyage d'affaires, directed by Sean Ellis
- 2009 : Espion(s), directed by Nicolas Saada
- 2009 : L'affaire Farewell, directed by Christian Carion
- 2009 : The Last Flight, directed by Karim Dridi
- 2010 : Last Night, directed by Massy Tadjedin
- 2011 : Une vie meilleure, directed by Cédric Kahn
- 2011 : La nouvelle guerre des boutons, L'instituteur
- 2012 : The Players, Thibault
- 2013 : Jappeloup as Pierre Durand, Jr.
- 2013 : Turning Tide as Frank Drevil
- 2014 : In the Name of My Daughter as Maurice Agnelet
- 2014 : Next Time I'll Aim for the Heart as Franck
- 2015 : The Program as Michele Ferrari
- 2015 : Minions as Herb Overkill (French-language version)
- 2016 : Arctic Heart as Quignard
- 2016 : Cézanne and I as Émile Zola
- 2016 : The Siege of Jadotville as Rene Faulques
- 2017 : Mon garçon as Julien
- 2017 : Rock'n Roll as Guillaume Canet
- 2018 : Sink or Swim
- 2018 : Non-Fiction
- 2018 : Paris Pigalle
- 2019 : La Belle Époque
- 2019 : In the Name of the Land
- 2021 : Lui
- 2023 : Asterix & Obelix: The Middle Kingdom, directed by Guillaume Canet
- 2023 : Acid
- 2023 : Out of Season
- 2024 : The Flood
- 2025 : Ad Vitam
- 2026 : Forty Love
- 2027 : Fantômas: The New World as Fantômas

== Awards and nominations ==
Year	Title	Award/Nomination
2002	Mon Idole	Nominated – César Award for Best Debut
2006	Tell No One	César Award for Best Director; Globes de Cristal Award for Best Film; Nominated – César Award for Best Film; Nominated – César Award for Best Adaptation

== Honours ==
In 2009, Canet was appointed a knight of the Ordre des Arts et des Lettres. In 2025 he was made a knight of the Légion d'honneur.

== Frequent casting ==
Actor	Mon Idole (2002)	Tell No One (2006)	Little White Lies (2010)	Blood Ties (2013)	Rock'n Roll (2017)	Little White Lies 2 (2019)	Asterix & Obelix: The Middle Kingdom (2023)	Karma (2026)
François Cluzet		check	check			check		
Marion Cotillard			check	check	check	check	check	check
Gilles Lellouche	check	check	check		check	check	check	
François Berléand	check	check						
Anne Marivin	check	check	check					
