= Rock'n Roll (2017 film) =

- Directed by: Guillaume Canet
- Written by: Guillaume Canet; Philippe Lefebvre; Rodolphe Lauga
- Produced by: Alain Attal
- Starring: Guillaume Canet; Marion Cotillard
- Cinematography: Christophe Offenstein
- Edited by: Hervé de Luze
- Music by: Maxim Nucci
- Production company: Les Productions du Trésor
- Distributed by: Pathé
- Release date: 15 February 2017
- Running time: 123 minutes
- Country: France
- Language: French
- Budget: $20.7 million
- Box office: $9.5 million

Rock'n Roll is a 2017 French comedy film written and directed by Guillaume Canet.

== Cast ==
- Guillaume Canet as Guillaume Canet
- Marion Cotillard as Marion Cotillard
- Philippe Lefebvre as Philippe Lefebvre
- Camille Rowe as Camille Rowe
- Gilles Lellouche as Gilles Lellouche
- Yvan Attal as Yvan Attal
- Alain Attal as Alain Attal
- Johnny Hallyday as Johnny Hallyday
- Laeticia Hallyday as Laeticia Hallyday
- Maxim Nucci as Maxim Nucci
- Yarol Poupaud as Yarol Poupaud
- Kev Adams as Kev Adams
- Ben Foster as Ben Foster
- Pierre-Benoist Varoclier as Nico
- Annie Mercier as The casting director
- Tifenn Michel-Borgey as Lucien
- Fabrice Lamy as Fabrice
- Théo Kailer as Gaetan
- Andy Picci as Andy Picci

== Reception ==
On review aggregator website Rotten Tomatoes, the film holds an approval rating of 67%, based on 9 reviews, and an average rating of 5.8/10.
