= Rivals (2008 French film) =

- Directed by: Jacques Maillot
- Written by: Jacques Maillot; Éric Véniard; Pierre Chosson
- Produced by: Jean-Baptiste Dupont; Cyril Colbeau-Justin
- Starring: Guillaume Canet; François Cluzet
- Cinematography: Luc Pagès
- Edited by: Andrea Sedláčková
- Music by: Stéphan Oliva
- Distributed by: StudioCanal
- Release date: 6 February 2008
- Running time: 106 minutes
- Country: France
- Language: French

Rivals (French: Les Liens du sang) is a 2008 French action film directed by Jacques Maillot.

== Cast ==
- Guillaume Canet as François
- François Cluzet as Gabriel
- Clotilde Hesme as Corinne
- Marie Denarnaud as Nathalie
- Mehdi Nebbou as José Lazaga
- Olivier Perrier as Henri
- Carole Franck as Monique
